= Intercollegiate sports team champions =

US student athletic competitions

The first tier of intercollegiate sports in the United States includes sports that are sanctioned by one of the collegiate sport governing bodies. The major sanctioning organization is the National Collegiate Athletic Association (NCAA). Before mid-1981, women's top-tier intercollegiate sports were solely governed by the Association for Intercollegiate Athletics for Women (AIAW). Smaller colleges are governed by the National Association of Intercollegiate Athletics (NAIA). Two-year colleges are governed by the National Junior College Athletic Association (NJCAA) in most of the country, except for the unaffiliated California Community College Athletic Association (CCCAA) and Northwest Athletic Conference (NWAC).

The second tier consists of competition between student clubs from different colleges, not organized by and therefore not formally representing the institutions or their faculties. This tier is also considered to be "intercollegiate" sports. Many of these sports have governing bodies that operate only at the collegiate level, such as the NCRHA. Other sports are governed by their national governing body, for example, USA Ultimate. College sports originated as student activities.

Intercollegiate Team Champions of Non-NCAA and Non-AIAW Sports in the United States:

- The championships below were bestowed by the governing bodies of specific collegiate sports in years when the sport lacked official varsity status in the NCAA (which many still lack) or in the AIAW (and the DGWS that preceded it).
- Women's rugby and equestrian are currently on the NCAA list of "Emerging Sports."
- Some sports (particularly women's sports) championships that are currently sanctioned by the NCAA were previously administered by a single-sport governing body (e.g., rifle, women's ice hockey, women's water polo).
- At some colleges, some of these sports operate at a club level outside of any athletic department. On the other hand, some teams have been accorded varsity status within their schools' athletic programs. Generally, there is no strict separation during competition, but there are exceptions (e.g., Varsity Equestrian since 2006, as it seeks official NCAA status).
- This list is reserved for champions of sports in which the NCAA did not also recognize a champion in a given year. Thus, non-varsity and/or club-level champions are excluded for sports that had a contemporary NCAA champion (e.g., men's ice hockey, alpine skiing) or other collegiate varsity-level champion (e.g., IRA rowing).
- Two exceptions are (1) women's fencing (the NCAA has not offered a women-only team championship since 1989) and (2) women's bowling (the long-established US Bowling Congress championship has co-eminence).

Key to initialism

Some schools in this list are more commonly known by their initials.

Athletics brand name	School
BYU	Brigham Young University
LSU	Louisiana State University
MIT	Massachusetts Institute of Technology
RIT	Rochester Institute of Technology
RPI	Rensselaer Polytechnic Institute
UCF	University of Central Florida
USC	University of Southern California
UTSA	University of Texas at San Antonio

Key to location

The locations of some schools in this list are not obvious from their names.

School	Location
Air Force	Colorado
Army (also, Military Academy)	New York
Babson	Massachusetts
Baylor	Texas
Bentley	Massachusetts
Bradley	Illinois
Bryant	Rhode Island
Castleton State	Vermont
Chico State	California
Coast Guard Academy	Connecticut
College of Charleston	South Carolina
Dayton	Ohio
Drexel	Pennsylvania
Furman	South Carolina
Georgetown	District of Columbia
Hobart and William Smith Colleges	New York
Holy Cross	Massachusetts
James Madison	Virginia
Johnson State	Vermont
Life University	Georgia
Lindenwood	Missouri
Lock Haven	Pennsylvania
Long Beach State	California
Merchant Marine Academy	New York
Middlebury	Vermont
Mount St. Mary's	Maryland
Navy (also, Naval Academy)	Maryland
Norwich	Vermont
Old Dominion	Virginia
Providence	Rhode Island
Radcliffe	Massachusetts
Radford	Virginia
Rensselaer Polytechnic Institute	New York
Roger Williams	Rhode Island
Saint Mary's College	California
Salisbury	Maryland
Shenandoah	Virginia
Shippensburg	Pennsylvania
Stonehill	Massachusetts
Stony Brook	New York
Temple	Pennsylvania
Tufts	Massachusetts
Tulane	Louisiana
Western Health Sciences	California

== Adventure Racing ==
United States Adventure Racing Association
Mixed teams unless indicated otherwise.

Year	Champion
2007	Garrett College (MD) (men's)
2009	University of Miami (FL)
2012	The Citadel
2013	Texas A&M
2014	Garrett College
2015	n/a
2016	n/a (no entries)
2018	Southwestern Baptist Theological Seminary

== Archery ==
=== USA Archery ===
Recurve
Year	Men	Women	Mixed
2015	James Madison	Columbia	UC Davis
2016	James Madison	Texas A&M	California
2017	James Madison	Columbia	Texas A&M
2018	Texas A&M	Texas A&M	Arizona State
2019	Texas	Texas A&M	Emmanuel College
2020	Canceled due to COVID-19		
2021	Texas A&M	Texas A&M	Texas A&M
2022	Texas A&M	Texas A&M	Mount Mary
2023	Texas A&M	Texas A&M	Texas A&M
2024	Texas A&M	Columbia	Texas A&M/Cumberlands
2025	Texas A&M	Columbia	Texas A&M
2026	Rio Grande	UC San Diego	Texas A&M

Barebow
Year	Men	Women	Mixed
2015	UCLA	UCLA	UCLA
2016	Long Beach State	UC Davis	California
2017	California	California	UCLA
2018	UC San Diego	Hocking College	UC Davis
2019	Lamar	UC Davis	UC Davis
2020	Canceled due to COVID-19		
2021	Texas A&M	Lindsey Wilson College	Texas A&M
2022	Texas A&M	Lindsey Wilson College	UC Irvine
2023	Texas A&M	Pikeville	Cumberlands
2024	Texas A&M	Pikeville	Pikeville
2025	Cumberlands	Rio Grande	Rio Grande
2026	Cumberlands	Campbellsville	Lindsey Wilson

Compound
Year	Men	Women	Mixed
2015	James Madison	Columbia	South Carolina
2016	Texas A&M	Texas A&M	Georgia Southern
2017	Michigan State	Columbia	Texas A&M
2018	Georgia Southern	Columbia	Texas A&M
2019	Cumberlands	Union College	Cumberlands
2020	Canceled due to COVID-19		
2021	Cumberlands	Union College	Cumberlands
2022	Cumberlands	Cumberlands	Cumberlands
2023	Cumberlands	Pikeville	Texas A&M
2024	Cumberlands	Cumberlands	Pikeville
2025	Union Commonwealth	Cumberlands	Texas A&M
2026	Rio Grande	Texas A&M	William Carey

Bowhunter
Year	Men	Women	Mixed
2015	Texas A&M	Penn College	Penn College
2016	Texas A&M	Texas A&M	Penn College
2017	Penn College	Texas A&M	Texas A&M
2018	Texas A&M	Texas A&M	Texas A&M
2019	Texas A&M	Union College	Wisconsin-La Crosse
2020	Canceled due to COVID-19		
2021	Union College	Cumberlands	Union College
2022	Lindsey Wilson College	Cumberlands	Wabash Valley
2023	Texas A&M	Cumberlands	Cumberlands
2024	Texas A&M	Cumberlands	Cumberlands
2025	Cumberlands	Pikeville	Cumberlands
2026	Cumberlands	Rio Grande	Texas A&M

Overall Team
Year	Champion
2015	Texas A&M
2016	Texas A&M
2017	Texas A&M
2018	Texas A&M
2019	Texas A&M
2020	Canceled due to COVID-19
2021	Texas A&M
2022	Cumberlands
2023	Cumberlands
2024	Texas A&M
2025	Cumberlands
2026	Texas A&M

=== US Collegiate Archery ===
(preceded by National Archery Association)

The inaugural U.S. intercollegiate archery championships were held in November 1967 at Arizona State University with individual competition only. The second such event was in May 1969. Team titles were not bestowed, although team scores were kept.

==== Outdoor Target ====
Year	Recurve, Women	Recurve, Men	Recurve, Mixed	Year	Recurve, Women	Recurve, Men	Recurve, Mixed
1969	Arizona State (unofficial)	Arizona State (unofficial)	Arizona State (unofficial)	1982	James Madison	Arizona State	Arizona State
1970	Arizona State	Los Angeles Pierce College	Arizona	1983	Arizona State	Arizona State	Arizona State
1971	Arizona State	San Bernardino Valley College	Arizona State	1984	Arizona State	Arizona State	Arizona State
1972	Arizona State	San Bernardino Valley College	Palomar CC (CA)	1985	Arizona State	Arizona State	Arizona State
1973	Riverside City College (CA)	San Bernardino Valley College	San Bernardino Valley College	1986	Arizona State	Arizona State	Arizona State
1974	San Bernardino Valley College	Arizona State	Arizona State	1987	Arizona State	Arizona State	Arizona State
1975	Arizona State	San Bernardino Valley College	East Stroudsburg State	1988	Arizona State	Arizona State	Arizona State
1976	Arizona State	East Stroudsburg State	Arizona State	1989	Arizona State	Arizona State	Arizona State
1977	Arizona State	East Stroudsburg State	Washington	1990	James Madison	Arizona State	Arizona State
1978	Arizona State	Akron	Arizona State	1991	Arizona State	Arizona State	Arizona State
1979	Arizona State	Cal State Los Angeles	Arizona State	1992	Arizona State	Arizona State	Arizona State
1980	Arizona State	Arizona State	Arizona State	1993	Arizona State	Arizona State	Arizona State
1981	Arizona State	Arizona State	Arizona State	1994	Arizona State	Arizona State	Arizona State

Junior College and 2-Year College Division (discontinued before 1985)

Year	Recurve, Women	Recurve, Men	Recurve, Mixed
1977	Glendale CC (AZ)	Colorado Northwestern	Atlantic CC (NJ)
1978	Glendale CC	Colorado Northwestern	Atlantic CC
1979	Glendale CC	Palomar College (CA)	Cypress College (CA)
1980	Phoenix College	Atlantic CC	Phoenix College
1981	Pima CC (AZ)	Palomar College	Palomar College
1982	Palomar College	Colorado Northwestern	?
1983 #	?	?	?
1984 #	?	?	?

# News reports of USIAC results in 1983 and 1984 mention only four-year schools. In 1985, two- and four-year schools are combined in the reported USIAC standings.

Recurve and Compound Bow

Year	Recurve, Women	Recurve, Men	Recurve, Mixed	Year	Compound, Women	Compound, Men	Compound, Mixed
1995	Texas A&M	Texas A&M	Texas A&M	1995	James Madison ‡	Texas A&M	James Madison †
1996	Texas A&M	Texas A&M	Texas A&M	1996	Texas A&M	Texas A&M	Texas A&M
1997	James Madison	Texas A&M	Texas A&M	1997	Texas A&M	Texas A&M	Texas A&M
1998	Michigan State	Texas A&M	Michigan State	1998	James Madison	Penn College	James Madison
1999	Texas A&M	Texas A&M	Texas A&M	1999	James Madison	Penn College	Texas A&M
2000	Texas A&M	Texas A&M	Texas A&M	2000	Texas A&M	James Madison	James Madison
2001	Texas A&M	Texas A&M	Texas A&M †	2001	Texas A&M	James Madison	Texas A&M †
2002	Texas A&M	Texas A&M	Texas A&M	2002	Texas A&M	Texas A&M	Texas A&M
2003	Texas A&M	Texas A&M	Texas A&M	2003	Texas A&M	Texas A&M	Texas A&M
2004	Texas A&M	Texas A&M	Texas A&M	2004	Texas A&M	Texas A&M	Texas A&M
2005	Columbia	Texas A&M	Texas A&M	2005	Texas A&M	James Madison	Texas A&M
2006	Stanford	Atlantic Cape CC (NJ)	Texas A&M †	2006	James Madison	James Madison	James Madison †
2007	Stanford	James Madison	James Madison	2007	Texas A&M	James Madison	James Madison
2008	Columbia	James Madison	Texas A&M	2008	James Madison	Penn College	James Madison
2009	Texas A&M	Penn College	Texas A&M	2009	Penn College	Atlantic Cape Community Coll.	Penn College
2010	Texas A&M	Penn College	Texas A&M	2010	Penn State	Penn College	Penn State
2011	Columbia	Texas A&M	Texas A&M	2011	Diné College^{∗}	Texas A&M	James Madison
2012	Texas A&M	Penn College	Arizona	2012	Texas A&M	Penn College	Texas A&M
2013	Columbia	Texas A&M	Texas A&M	2013	Texas A&M	Texas A&M	Texas A&M
2014	Texas A&M	Texas A&M	Atlantic Cape CC (NJ)	2014	Texas A&M	Texas A&M	Texas A&M
2015	Florida	Northern Arizona	Long Beach State	2015	Cumberlands (KY)	Michigan State	Florida
2016	UC Irvine	UC Irvine	UC Irvine	2016	Cumberlands (KY)	Northern Arizona	Cumberlands (KY)
2017	UC Irvine	UC Irvine	UC Irvine	2017	Union College	Cumberlands (KY)	Cumberlands (KY)
2018	UC Irvine	South Dakota	UC Irvine	2018	Union College	Union College	Union College

† There being a lack of specific citations for this mixed team title, the result was calculated based on the raw FITA round scores. (It appears that by 1995 the competition format added bracketed elimination rounds after the initial FITA rounds to determine the men's and women's champions, but not the mixed team titles.)

‡ Based on a news account, it appears that James Madison was the only team eligible for the women's compound bow team title, a new discipline in the 1995 USIAC.

^{∗} This is believed to be the first time a tribal college team has won the top-level intercollegiate national championship event in any sport.

Bow Hunter

In 2012 the USIAC began team competition in bow hunting.

Year	Bow Hunter, Women	Bow Hunter, Men	Bow Hunter, Mixed
2012	Penn. Coll. of Technology	Penn. Coll. of Technology	Penn. Coll. of Technology
2013	Penn. Coll. of Technology	Texas A&M	Penn. Coll. of Technology
2014	Michigan State	Michigan State	James Madison
2015	University of the Cumberlands	University of the Cumberlands	University of the Cumberlands
2016	University of the Cumberlands	University of the Cumberlands	University of the Cumberlands
2017	University of the Cumberlands	University of the Cumberlands	Union College
2018	University of the Cumberlands	University of the Cumberlands	University of the Cumberlands

Basic Bow

Year	Basic Bow, Women	Basic Bow, Men	Basic Bow, Mixed
2013	n/a	Georgia Southern	n/a
2014	n/a	U of California–Irvine	Georgia Southern
2015	Georgia Southern	U of California–Irvine	Georgia Southern
2016	U of California–Irvine	U of California–Irvine	U of California–Irvine
2017	n/a	UC Irvine	UC Irvine
2018	Hocking College	University of Pikeville	University of Pikeville

==== 3D Target ====
Recurve
Year	Women	Mixed
2014	n/a	Missouri
2015	Univ. of the Cumberlands	n/a
2017	UC Irvine	Golden West College

Basic bow
Year	Men	Women	Mixed
2014	n/a	n/a	Georgia Southern
2015	n/a	n/a	Wisconsin–Stevens Point
2017	UC Irvine	Hocking College	Hocking College

Recurve Basic Bow Combined
Year	Men	Mixed
2016	U of California–Irvine	U of California–Irvine

Bowhunter
Year	Men	Women	Mixed
2014	n/a	n/a	Southeastern Illinois College
2015	Univ. of the Cumberlands	Univ. of the Cumberlands	Mississippi College
2016	Univ. of the Cumberlands	Southeastern Illinois College	Union College
2017	Liberty University	Univ. of the Cumberlands	Univ. of the Cumberlands

Compound
Year	Men	Women	Mixed
2014	n/a	n/a	Univ. of the Cumberlands
2015	Union College (KY)	Univ. of the Cumberlands	Union College
2016	Madisonville Comm. College (KY)	Univ. of the Cumberlands	Union College
2017	Union College	Univ. of the Cumberlands	Univ. of the Cumberlands

=== National Archery Association ===
Telegraphic or Mail Tournament (Women Recurve)

National Archery Association (1930 - at least 1973)

- 1930 UCLA or Phoenix JC
- 1931 UCLA or Phoenix JC
- 1932 UCLA or Phoenix JC
- 1933 Phoenix Junior College
- 1934 Phoenix Junior College
- 1935 Los Angeles Junior College
- 1936 Los Angeles Junior College
- 1937 Los Angeles Junior College
- 1938 Los Angeles Junior College
- 1939 Los Angeles City College
- 1940 Los Angeles City College
- 1941 Connecticut
- 1942 Connecticut
- 19??
- 1972 East Stroudsburg State, Drexel (different rounds)

== Badminton ==
Women's championships administered by DGWS (1970-72) / AIAW (1973-82) are included for completeness.

All others administered by American Badminton Association (later named U.S. Badminton Assn., now USA Badminton).

Year	Men	Women	Mixed Team	Year	Men	Women	Mixed Team	Year	Men	Women	Mixed Team
1970		Long Beach State		1991	Arizona State	Arizona State	Arizona State	2012			
1971		Arizona State		1992	Arizona State	Arizona State	Arizona State	2013			UC Berkeley
1972		Pasadena City College		1993	Arizona State	Arizona State	Arizona State	2014			
1973		Pasadena City College		1994	?	?	?	2015			UC Berkeley
1974		Long Beach State		1995	?	?	Howard	2016			USC
1975	Cal State–Dominguez Hills	Arizona State		1996	George Washington	Bryn Mawr College	Bryn Mawr College (PA)	2017			
1976	San Diego State	Arizona State		1997			Stanford	2018			
1977	UCLA	UCLA		1998			Stanford	2019			UC Berkeley
1978	Arizona State	Arizona State		1999	Stanford	Stanford	Stanford	2020			
1979	Cal State–Dominguez Hills	Arizona State		2000	?	?	UC Berkeley	2021			
1980	Arizona State	Arizona State		2001	Howard University (DC)	UC San Diego	UC San Diego	2022			
1981	UCLA	Arizona State		2002	?	?	Howard	2023			
1982	UCLA	Northern Illinois		2003	UC San Diego	UC San Diego	UC San Diego	2024			
1983	Arizona State	Wisconsin	Arizona State	2004	?	?	UC Irvine	2025			
1984	Arizona State	Arizona State	Arizona State	2005	UC San Diego	UC San Diego	UC San Diego	2026			
1985	Arizona State	Arizona State	Arizona State	2006	UC San Diego	UC San Diego	UC San Diego	2027			
1986	Arizona State	Arizona State	Arizona State	2007	UC Irvine	?	UC Irvine	2028			
1987	Arizona State	Arizona State	Arizona State	2008	UC Irvine	UC Berkeley	UC Irvine	2029			
1988	Arizona State	Arizona State	Arizona State	2009	?	?	UC Berkeley	2030			
1989	Arizona State	Arizona State	Arizona State	2010	UC Berkeley	UC Berkeley	not awarded	2031			
1990	Arizona State	Arizona State	Arizona State	2011	Purdue	Illinois-Urbana	not awarded	2032			

Intercollegiate Badminton Association, a league founded in 2007, held a few competitions starting in 2008 and faded for lack of members.

Year	Men	Women	Mixed Team
2008	Purdue	Bryn Mawr College	?
2009	Illinois-Chicago	Pennsylvania	Pennsylvania

== Billiards ==
Association of College Unions International
(ACUI) has conducted intercollegiate billiards tournaments since 1933. See the ACUI website for the list of men's and women's individual champions since 1937.

(1936–38 telegraphic)

Year	Pocket	Straight rail	Three-cushion
1936	Michigan	Purdue	Cornell
1937	Wisconsin	Cornell	Iowa State
1938	Florida	Cornell	Wisconsin
19??	?	?	?

== Bowling ==
United States Bowling Congress (American Bowling Congress 1975–1977, ABC/WIBC 1977–2005, USBC 2005–)

Men
Year and Champion	Year and Champion	Year and Champion	Year and Champion	Year and Champion	Year and Champion
1975 Wisconsin–La Crosse	1984 Buffalo State	1993 Wichita State	2002 Western Illinois	2011 Fresno State	2021 Wichita State
1976 South Carolina	1985 Wisconsin–La Crosse	1994 Wichita State	2003 Wichita State	2012 Webber International (Florida)	2022 Wisconsin–Whitewater
1977 West Liberty (West Virginia)	1986 Erie Community College (NY)	1995 Wichita State	2004 Kansas	2013 Robert Morris–Illinois	2023 Wichita State
1978 Minnesota	1987 Wichita State	1996 Nebraska	2005 Lindenwood (Missouri)	2014 Lindenwood	2024 Webber International
1979 California	1988 Erie Community College	1997 Saginaw Valley State	2006 Saginaw Valley State	2015 Wichita State	2025 Wisconsin–Whitewater
1980 Wichita State	1989 Cal State-Fullerton	1998 Wichita State	2007 Saginaw Valley State	2016 McKendree (IL)	2026 Saint Ambrose (Iowa)
1981 Arizona State	1990 Nebraska	1999 Western Illinois	2008 Wichita State	2017 ~~Webber International~~	
1982 Washington State	1991 Saginaw Valley State (Michigan)	2000 West Texas A&M	2009 Wichita State	2018 McKendree	
1983 Vincennes (Indiana)	1992 William Paterson (NJ)	2001 Western Illinois	2010 Wichita State	2019 Webber International	

• 2017 title won by Webber International was vacated due to use of a player who was ineligible for competition.

United States Bowling Congress (Women's International Bowling Congress 1975–1977, ABC/WIBC 1977–2005, USBC 2005– )

Women
Year and Champion	Year and Champion	Year and Champion	Year and Champion	Year and Champion	Year and Champion
1975 Wichita State	1984 Indiana State	1993 William Paterson (NJ)	2002 Morehead State	2011 Maryland Eastern Shore	2021 Wichita State
1976 San Jose State	1985 West Texas State	1994 Wichita State	2003 Central Missouri State	2012 Webber International	2022 Stephen F. Austin (Texas)
1977 Wichita State	1986 Wichita State	1995 Nebraska	2004 Pikeville (Kentucky)	2013 Maryland Eastern Shore	2023 McKendree
1978 Wichita State	1987 West Texas State	1996 West Texas State	2005 Wichita State	2014 Robert Morris–Illinois	2024 Wichita State
1979 Penn State	1988 West Texas State	1997 Nebraska	2006 Lindenwood (Missouri)	2015 North Carolina A&T	2025 Jacksonville State (Alabama)
1980 Erie Community College (NY)	1989 Morehead State (Kentucky)	1998 Morehead State	2007 Wichita State	2016 Webber International	2026 Jacksonville State
1981 Arizona State	1990 Wichita State	1999 Nebraska	2008 Pikeville	2017 McKendree (IL)	
1982 Erie Community College	1991 Nebraska	2000 Morehead State	2009 Wichita State	2018 Lindenwood	
1983 West Texas State	1992 West Texas State	2001 Nebraska	2010 Webber International (Florida)	2019 Robert Morris–Illinois	

• Starting in 2004, the NCAA has sponsored a women's team championship, apart from the USBC national championships.
• 2020 edition was canceled due to COVID-19 pandemic.

== Boxing ==
National Collegiate Boxing Association
Preceded by NCAA championships, 1932–1960

Men

Year and Champion	Year and Champion	Year and Champion	Year and Champion	Year and Champion	Year and Champion
1976 Nevada	1985 US Air Force Academy	1994 US Air Force Academy	2003 US Air Force Academy	2012 US Military Academy	2021^{∗} No tournament held
1977 West Chester State College (PA)	1986 US Air Force Academy	1995 US Air Force Academy	2004 US Air Force Academy	2013 US Military Academy	2022 US Military Academy
1978 Nevada	1987 US Naval Academy	1996 US Naval Academy	2005 US Naval Academy	2014 US Military Academy	2023 US Air Force Academy
1979 West Chester State College	1988 US Air Force Academy	1997 US Naval Academy	2006 Nevada-Las Vegas	2015 Nevada	2024 US Naval Academy
1980 US Air Force Academy	1989 US Air Force Academy	1998 US Naval Academy	2007 Lock Haven University (PA)	2016 US Military Academy	2025 US Naval Academy
1981 US Air Force Academy	1990 US Air Force Academy	1999 US Air Force Academy	2008 US Military Academy	2017 US Military Academy	2026 Washington
1982 West Chester University	1991 Nevada	2000 US Air Force Academy	2009 US Military Academy	2018 US Military Academy	2027
1983 US Air Force Academy	1992 US Air Force Academy	2001 US Air Force Academy	2010 US Military Academy	2019 US Military Academy	
1984 US Air Force Academy	1993 Nevada	2002 US Air Force Academy	2011 US Military Academy	2020^{∗} No tournament held	

Women

Year	Champion
2014	Washington
2015	Washington
2016	Washington
2017	US Military Academy
2018	US Military Academy
2019	US Naval Academy
2020	No tournament held^{∗}
2021	No tournament held^{∗}
2022	US Naval Academy
2023	US Military Academy
2024	US Military Academy
2025	US Air Force Academy
2026	US Air Force Academy

United States Intercollegiate Boxing Association

Year	Men	Women
2013	UC Davis	US Military Academy
2014	Michigan	US Military Academy
2015	Virginia Military Institute	Michigan
2016	Olivet College (MI)	Michigan
2017	Michigan	Michigan
2018	Illinois	Michigan
2019	Illinois	Georgetown
2020	No tournament held^{∗}	
2021	No tournament held^{∗}	
2022	Virginia Military Institute	Illinois
2023	Illinois	UC Riverside
2024	Washington	Washington
2025	Illinois	Illinois
2026	UC Riverside	Michigan

^{∗} Cancelled due to the COVID-19 outbreak.

== Canoe/Kayak ==
=== Flatwater ===
USA Canoe/Kayak

Year and Champion	Year and Champion	Year and Champion	Year and Champion	Year and Champion
1978 St. Mary's College (Maryland)	2004 Stanford	2008 Georgia Tech	2012 Oklahoma City University	2016 ?
2001 Georgia Tech	2005 Stanford	2009 Georgia Tech	2013 North Georgia	2017
2002 Stanford	2006 Georgia Tech	2010 Georgia Tech	2014 North Georgia	2018
2003 Stanford	2007 Georgia Tech	2011 Georgia Tech	2015 ?	2019

=== Downriver ===
American Canoe Association

Year	Men	Women
2007	Albion College (MI)†	
2008	Albion College	
2009	Albion College	
2010	Albion College	
shifted from fall 2011 to spring 2012
2012	Albion College	
2013	Warren Wilson (NC)	
2014	Warren Wilson	Warren Wilson
shifted from spring (2015) to fall (2014 and thereafter)
2014	Warren Wilson	Albion College
2015	Penn State	Warren Wilson
2016	Penn State	Warren Wilson

† In 2007 all other competitors withdrew because of rough river conditions.

== Climbing ==
USA Climbing

Year	Champion
2009	Central Florida
2010	Central Florida
2011	Central Florida
2012	Texas
2013	Texas
2014	Texas
2015	Colorado State
2016	Colorado State
2017	
2018	
2019	
2020	
2021	
2022	Utah
2023	Utah
2024	Utah
2025	Utah
2026	Utah

== Cricket ==
Intercollegiate Cricket Association (1881–1924)

Year	Champion	Year	Champion	Year	Champion	Year	Champion	Year	Champion
1881	no award	1890	Pennsylvania, Haverford, Harvard	1899	Harvard	1908	Pennsylvania	1917	not played (WWI)
1882	Pennsylvania	1891	Pennsylvania	1900	Pennsylvania	1909	Pennsylvania	1918	not played (WWI)
1883	Pennsylvania	1892	Pennsylvania, Haverford, Harvard	1901	Pennsylvania	1910	Haverford	1919	Haverford
1884	Haverford	1893	Haverford	1902	Haverford	1911	Pennsylvania	1920	Pennsylvania
1885	Pennsylvania	1894	Harvard	1903	Pennsylvania, Haverford, Harvard	1912	Pennsylvania	1921	not played
1886	Pennsylvania	1895	Haverford	1904	Haverford	1913	Pennsylvania	1922	Pennsylvania, Haverford
1887	Pennsylvania	1896	Haverford	1905	Haverford	1914	Pennsylvania	1923	Haverford
1888	Pennsylvania	1897	Harvard	1906	Pennsylvania, Haverford, Cornell	1915	Haverford	1924	Haverford
1889	Pennsylvania	1898	Haverford	1907	Pennsylvania	1916	Haverford		

=== Twenty20 ===
American College Cricket

Year	Champion
2009	Montgomery College (MD)
2010	York University (Toronto)
2011	George Mason (VA)
2012	York College (NY)
2013	Maryland–Baltimore County
2014	South Florida
2015	University of Texas at Dallas
2016	South Florida
2017	Ryerson
2018	Virginia Tech
2019	West Virginia
2020	West Virginia
2021	Canceled
2022	West Virginia
2023	Pittsburgh

National College Cricket Association

Year	Champion
2019	Houston
2020	Canceled
2021	
2022	Arizona State
2023	D1: Northeastern; D2: California
2024	First Leg: Texas A&M; Second Leg: Wisconsin
2025	First Leg: Penn State; Second Leg: UT Dallas

== Croquet ==
United States Croquet Association

American Rules (Six-Wicket)

Year	Champion	Year	Champion	Year	Champion
1991	Harvard University	2006	St. John's College - Annapolis	2021	Not contested
1992	Harvard University	2007	St. John's College - Annapolis	2022	?
1993	Harvard University	2008	St. John's College - Annapolis	2023	United States Naval Academy
1994	United States Naval Academy	2009	St. John's College - Annapolis	2024	St. John's College - Annapolis
1995	Georgetown University	2010	St. John's College - Annapolis	2025	
1996	Georgetown University	2011	SUNY - New Paltz	2026	
1997	St. John's College - Annapolis	2012	SUNY - New Paltz		
1998	St. John's College - Annapolis	2013	St. John's College - Annapolis		
1999	St. John's College - Annapolis	2014	United States Naval Academy		
2000	St. John's College - Annapolis	2015	St. John's College - Annapolis		
2001	Not contested	2016	St. John's College - Annapolis		
2002	University of Virginia	2017	Penn State University		
2003	University of Virginia	2018	St. John's College - Annapolis		
2004	St. John's College - Annapolis	2019	St. John's College - Annapolis		
2005	St. John's College - Annapolis	2020	Not contested		

Golf Croquet

Year	Champion	Year	Champion
2001	University of Virginia	2016	Oklahoma Wesleyan
2002	Not contested	2017	Penn State University
2003	Not contested	2018	United States Naval Academy
2004	Not contested	2019	?
2005	?	2020	Not contested
2006	?	2021	Not contested
2007	Davidson College	2022	Oklahoma Wesleyan
2008	Davidson College	2023	Oklahoma Wesleyan
2009	College of William & Mary	2024	St. John's College - Annapolis
2010	Davidson College	2025	
2011	Oklahoma Wesleyan	2026	
2012	College of William & Mary	2027	
2013	Oklahoma Wesleyan		
2014	United States Naval Academy		
2015	Oklahoma Wesleyan		

== Curling ==
College Curling USA

US College Curling National Championship

Prior to 2013, the championship was set up into "Experience" Divisions (Division I most experienced, Division V least experienced) with schools permitted entries in more than one division. Entry into the championship tournament was open to any team until the division bracket was full. Starting in 2013 there is a single national champion; entry is by invitation to the top sixteen schools in the country based on Merit Points earned in competition during the year. In all cases there is no gender breakdown; teams can consist of any combination of men and women players.

Year	Champion	Year	Champion
1992	Wisconsin–Eau Claire		
1993	?	1999	?
1994	?	2000	?
1995	?	2001	?
1996	?	2002	?
1997	?	2003	?
1998	?	2004	?

Year	Division I	Division II	Division III	Division IV	Division V
2005	Green Bay	Marquette	Marquette	Oakland	Lawrence Tech
2006	Washington	Boston University	Minnesota–Duluth	Oakland	Purdue
2007	Multi-school team	Boston University	Wisconsin–Stevens Point	RIT	Hamilton (NY)
2008	Wisconsin–Eau Claire	Northwestern	Hamilton (NY)	Hamilton (NY)	
2009	Minnesota	Hamilton (NY)	Tennessee	Northwestern	
2010	Wisconsin–Oshkosh	Northwestern	Northwestern	Carroll (WI)	
2011	MIT	Villanova	Northwestern	Bowdoin	
2012	Not contested				

Year	Champion	Runner-up	Third	Fourth	Fifth
2013	Minnesota	St. Benedict/St. John's (MN)	MIT	Boston University	
2014	Green Bay	Villanova	Carroll (WI)	MIT	
2015	Wisconsin–Stevens Point	Penn	MIT	RIT	Boston University
2016	Penn	Minnesota	MIT	Colgate	Hamilton (NY)
2017	Minnesota	Nebraska	Wisconsin–Stevens Point	Penn	St. Norbert
2018	Wisconsin–Stevens Point	Nebraska	Yale	Penn	RIT
2019	North Dakota State	SUNY Poly	MIT	Yale	Syracuse
2020	Not Contested				
2021	Not Contested				
2022	Wisconsin - Stevens Point	University of Pennsylvania	Wisconsin - Superior	Harvard	North Dakota State University
2023	University of Pennsylvania	Princeton	North Dakota State University		
2024	Wisconsin–Madison	Princeton	Michigan Tech	Wisconsin–Stevens Point	
2025	Wisconsin–Madison	Michigan Tech	RPI	Bowdoin	MIT
2026	Wisconsin–Madison	Wisconsin–Stevens Point	Penn State	Bowdoin	RIT

== Disc Golf ==
National Collegiate Disc Golf Union

Year	Men's Champion	Women's Champions
2007	Georgia	
2008	Georgia	
2009	Mississippi State	
2010	Augusta State^{†}	
2011	Oregon	
2012	Colorado State	Mississippi State
2013	Tennessee Tech	Mississippi State
2014	Georgia Regents^{†}	Humboldt State
2015	Ferris State	Cal State Monterey Bay
2016	Augusta^{†}	Cal State Monterey Bay
2017	Ferris State	Cal State Monterey Bay
2018	Mississippi State	Liberty
2019	Ferris State	Southern Arkansas
2020	Not contested	
2021	Georgia	Ferris State
2022	Missouri	Missouri
2023	Cincinnati	Missouri
2024	Charlotte	Liberty
2025	Cincinnati	Liberty
2026	Milligan	Milligan

^{†} different names for same school

== Dodgeball ==
National Collegiate Dodgeball Association

Year	Champion
2005	Ohio State University
2006	Ohio State University
2007	Grand Valley State
2008	Grand Valley State
2009	Grand Valley State
2010	Grand Valley State
2011	Central Michigan
2012	Saginaw Valley State
2013	Grand Valley State
2014	Grand Valley State
2015	Grand Valley State
2016	Grand Valley State
2017	Grand Valley State
2018	Grand Valley State
2019	Towson University
2020	Canceled Due to COVID-19 Pandemic
2021	Canceled Due to COVID-19 Pandemic
2022	Grand Valley State
2023	Michigan State University
2024	Michigan State University
2025	Miami University (OH)
2026	Michigan State University

== Equestrian ==
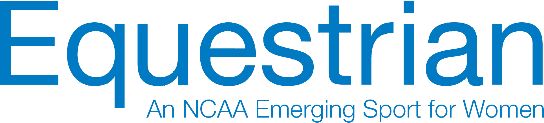
Logo of ESW Equestrian

Equestrian became an NCAA Emerging Sports for Women in 2002.

=== English ===
==== Intercollegiate Horse Show Association ====
Year and Champion	Year and Champion	Year and Champion	Year and Champion
1971 Stony Brook	1985 Southern Seminary College	1999 Skidmore College	2013 Tie: St. Lawrence University and Skidmore College
1972 Connecticut	1986 Mount Holyoke College (MA)	2000 Mount Holyoke College	2014 Centenary College
1973 St. Lawrence University (NY)	1987 Southern Seminary College	2001 University of Findlay (OH)	2015 Savannah College of Art and Design (GA)
1974 Bennett College (NY)	1988 Southern Seminary College	2002 Ohio University	2016 Savannah College of Art and Design
1975 Massachusetts	1989 Tie: Colby-Sawyer College (NH) and Penn State	2003 Stonehill College (MA)	2017 Savannah College of Art and Design
1976 St. Lawrence University	1990 Skidmore College (NY)	2004 Virginia Intermont	2018 Skidmore College
1977 St. Lawrence University	1991 Skidmore College	2005 Virginia Intermont	2019 Emory & Henry College (Va.)
1978 Centenary College (NJ)	1992 Virginia	2006 Mount Holyoke College	2020 - Championship not held (COVID-19) -
1979 Centenary College	1993 Hollins College (VA)	2007 Virginia Intermont	2021 - Championship not held (COVID-19) -
1980 Stony Brook	1994 Colby-Sawyer College	2008 Kentucky	2022 Emory & Henry College (Va.)
1981 Southern Seminary College (VA)	1995 Skidmore College	2009 Centenary College	2023 Skidmore College
1982 Southern Seminary College	1996 Skidmore College	2010 Skidmore College	2024 Savannah College of Art and Design
1983 Southern Seminary College	1997 Delaware	2011 Centenary College	2025 Purdue University
1984 Southern Seminary College	1998 Hollins College	2012 St. Lawrence University	2026 Savannah College of Art and Design

Note: Emory & Henry College absorbed Virginia Intermont College's equestrian program when it closed at the end of the 2013–14 academic year. All championships from both colleges are credited to the program as "Intermont Equestrian at Emory & Henry College."

==== American National Riding Commission ====
The championship showcases the American Forward Riding System and the sporting horse. Judged on equitation as a three-phase competition, competitors complete a dressage sportif ride, an outdoor hunter trials course and a USEF Medal-type hunter seat equitation course. Riders ride the same horse throughout the competition, and jumps do not exceed 3 feet in height.

Year and Champion	Year and Champion	Year and Champion	Year and Champion	Year and Champion	Year and Champion
1978 - Sweet Briar College (VA)	1987 - Sweet Briar College	1996 - St. Andrews Presbyterian College (NC)	2005 - Savannah College of Art and Design (GA)	2014 - Savannah College of Art and Design	2023 - Savannah College of Art and Design
1979 - Sweet Briar College	1988 - Sweet Briar College	1997 - St. Andrews Presbyterian College	2006 - Savannah College of Art and Design	2015 - Savannah College of Art and Design	2024 - Savannah College of Art and Design
1980 - Sweet Briar College	1989 - Sweet Briar College	1998 - St. Lawrence University (NY)	2007 - St. Andrews Presbyterian College	2016 - Centenary College	2025 - Savannah College of Art and Design
1981 - Virginia	1990 - Sweet Briar College	1999 - Sweet Briar College	2008 - Savannah College of Art and Design	2017 - Savannah College of Art and Design	2026 - Savannah College of Art and Design
1982 - Virginia	1991 - Virginia	2000 - St. Andrews Presbyterian College	2009 - Savannah College of Art and Design	2018 - Savannah College of Art and Design	
1983 - Virginia	1992 - Virginia	2001 - St. Andrew's Presbyterian College	2010 - Savannah College of Art and Design	2019 - Savannah College of Art and Design	
1984 - Virginia	1993 - Virginia	2002 - St. Andrew's Presbyterian College	2011 - Savannah College of Art and Design	2020 -	
1985 - Virginia	1994 - Virginia	2003 - Savannah College of Art and Design	2012 - Savannah College of Art and Design	2021 -	
1986 - Sweet Briar College	1995 - Virginia	2004 - Virginia Intermont College	2013 - Centenary College (NJ)	2022 - Centenary University	

Note: Emory & Henry College absorbed Virginia Intermont College's equestrian program when it closed at the end of the 2013–14 academic year. All championships from both colleges are credited to the program as "Intermont Equestrian at Emory & Henry College."

=== Dressage ===
Intercollegiate Dressage Association

Year and Champion	Year and Champion	Year and Champion	Year and Champion	Year and Champion
2002 Mount Holyoke College (MA)	2007 Virginia Intermont College	2012 Johnson & Wales University (RI)	2017 Averett University	2022 Otterbein University
2003 Mount Holyoke College	2008 Mount Holyoke College	2013 Mount Holyoke College	2018 Emory & Henry College	2023 Otterbein University
2004 Mount Holyoke College	2009 New Hampshire	2014 Virginia Intermont College	2019 Otterbein University	2024 Emory & Henry College
2005 Lake Erie College (OH)	2010 Virginia Intermont College	2015 Emory & Henry College (Va.)	2020 - Championship not held (COVID-19)	2025 Emory & Henry College
2006 Virginia Intermont College	2011 Lake Erie College	2016 Emory & Henry College	2021 - Championship not held (COVID-19)	2026 - Virginia Tech

Note: Emory & Henry College absorbed Virginia Intermont College's equestrian program when it closed at the end of the 2013–14 academic year. All championships from both colleges are credited to the program as "Intermont Equestrian at Emory & Henry College."

=== Western ===
American Quarter Horse Association

Year and Champion	Year and Champion	Year and Champion	Year and Champion	Year and Champion	Year and Champion
1979 & 1980 Miami University (OH)	1989 Michigan State	1996 Ohio State	2005 University of Findlay (OH)	2014 Ohio State	2023 Middle Tennessee State
1981 Murray State (KY)	1990 Western Kentucky (tie)	1997 Ohio State	2006 Ohio State	2015 Berry College	2024 Middle Tennessee State
1982 Miami University	1990 Michigan State (tie)	1998 New Mexico State	2007 University of Findlay	2016 St. Andrews University (NC) and Berry College	2025 Black Hawk College
1983 Ball State (IN)	1991 Ohio State	1999 Ohio State	2008 Ohio State	2017 St. Andrew's University	2026
1984 Morehead State (KY)	1992 Ohio State	2000 Oklahoma State	2009 University of Findlay	2018 University of Findlay	2027
1985 Murray State	1993 Ohio State	2001 University of Findlay	2010 University of Findlay	2019 University of Findlay	2028
1986 Otterbein College (OH)	1994 Colorado State (tie)	2002 Texas A&M and Ohio State (tie)	2011 Berry College (GA)	2020	
1987 Midway College (KY)	1994 Texas A&M (tie)	2003 Texas A&M and West Texas A&M (tie)	2012 Oregon State	2021	
1988 Ball State	1995 New Mexico State	2004 Texas A&M	2013 West Texas A&M	2022 Black Hawk College	

=== Multidisciplinary ===
National Collegiate Equestrian Association

A Varsity Equestrian championship is held each year among colleges and universities competing at the varsity level. Because equestrian has two unique disciplines, through 2013 this event crowned a national champion in each of three areas: Western, Hunter Seat and Overall.

Year	Western	Hunter Seat	Overall	Year	Western	Hunter Seat	Overall
2002	West Texas A&M	Georgia	Texas A&M	2014	N/A	N/A	Georgia
2003	Oklahoma State	Georgia and Stonehill (MA)	Georgia	2015	N/A	N/A	South Carolina
2004	Oklahoma State	Georgia	Georgia	2016	N/A	N/A	Auburn
2005	Texas A&M	South Carolina	South Carolina	2017	N/A	N/A	Texas A&M
2006	Oklahoma State	South Carolina	Auburn	2018	Auburn	Auburn	Auburn
2007	Texas A&M	South Carolina	South Carolina	2019	Auburn	Auburn	Georgia
2008	TCU	Auburn	Georgia	2020	cancelled (pandemic)		
2009	Texas A&M	Georgia	Georgia				
2010	Texas A&M	Georgia	Georgia				
2011	Texas A&M	Auburn	Auburn				
2012	Texas A&M	Baylor	Texas A&M				
2013	Oklahoma State	Auburn	Auburn				

Year	Dual Discipline	Single Discipline Jumping Seat
2021	Georgia	Sweet Briar
2022	Oklahoma State	Lynchburg
2023	SMU	Lynchburg
2024	SMU	Lynchburg
2025	Georgia	Dartmouth
2026	South Carolina	Lynchburg

== Fencing, Women-only ==
National Intercollegiate Women's Fencing Association (NIWFA), (IWFA 1929-63)

Team Foil

NIWFA title competition was held in addition to the AIAW championship from 1980 to 1982 and the NCAA women's championship from 1982 to 1989. Starting in 1990, the NCAA combined its men's and women's team championships, declaring one overall annual champion. Starting in 2026, the NCAA again conducts a separate women’s fencing championship. NIWFA membership in 2018 consisted of 20 schools. There were 41 schools with women's varsity programs in all divisions of the NCAA, as of 9/1/09. Most, if not all, NIWFA member schools are members of the NCAA.

Year and Champion	Year and Champion	Year and Champion	Year and Champion	Year and Champion	Year and Champion	Year and Champion
1964 Paterson State College (NJ)	1974 Cal State-Fullerton	1984 St. John's * (NY)	1994 Princeton	2004 Temple (PA)	2014 Temple	2024 Temple
1965 Paterson State College	1975 San Jose State	1985 St. John's *	1995 Princeton	2005 Temple	2015 Temple	2025 Tufts
1966 Paterson State College	1976 San Jose State	1986 Temple *	1996 Rutgers (NJ)	2006 Temple	2016 Temple	2026 Temple
1967 Cornell	1977 San Jose State	1987 Temple *	1997 Temple	2007 Temple	2017 Temple	2027
1968 Cornell	1978 San Jose State	1988 Temple *	1998 Fairleigh Dickinson (NJ)	2008 Temple	2018 Temple	2028
1969 Cornell	1979 San Jose State	1989 Temple *	1999 Temple	2009 Temple	2019 Temple	2029
1970 Hunter College (NY)	1980 Penn State (also won AIAW)	1990 Paterson State College	2000 Temple	2010 Temple	2020 Temple	2030
1971 New York University	1981 St. John's (AIAW: Penn State)	1991 Temple	2001 Temple	2011 Temple	2021 cancelled	2031
1972 Cornell University	1982 Yale * (also won AIAW)	1992 Cornell	2002 Temple	2012 Temple	2022 Temple	2032
1973 Cornell	1983 Yale *	1993 Cornell	2003 Temple	2013 Temple	2023 Temple	2033

* did not win NCAA women’s team foil championship in years conducted (1982-89)

Team Épée, Team Sabre, Combined Discipline

Year	Team Épée	Team Sabre	Combined (Foil, Épée, Sabre)
1995	Princeton		--
1996	James Madison (VA)		Temple (PA) †
1997	Johns Hopkins (MD)		Temple †
1998	Temple		Temple †
1999	Temple		Temple †
2000	Temple	Tufts (MA)	Temple
2001	Temple	Temple	Temple
2001	Temple	Temple	Div III: US Military Academy
2002	Temple	Temple	Temple
2002	Temple	Temple	Div III: Johns Hopkins
2003	Temple	Tufts	Temple
2004	Temple	US Military Academy	Temple
2005	Fairleigh Dickinson (NJ)	Drew (NJ)	Temple
2006	Drew	Tufts	Temple
2007	Stevens Institute of Technology (NJ)	Temple	Temple
2008	Temple	Temple	Temple
2009	Temple	Temple	Temple
2010	Temple	Temple	Temple
2011	Temple	Temple	Temple
2012	Temple	Temple	Temple
2013	Temple	Temple	Temple
2014	Temple	Temple	Temple
2015	Temple	Temple	Temple
2016	Stevens Institute	Temple	Temple
2017	Temple	Johns Hopkins	Temple
2018	Stevens Institute	Johns Hopkins	Temple
2019	Temple	Johns Hopkins	Temple
2019	Temple	Johns Hopkins	Div III: Johns Hopkins
2020	Temple	Temple	Temple
2021	cancelled (pandemic)		
2022	Temple	Temple	Temple
2023	Temple	Temple	Temple
2024	William & Mary	Temple	Temple
2025	Temple	Temple	Temple
2026	Temple	Johns Hopkins	Temple #

† Foil and Épée only

# did not win NCAA women’s team championship (combined discipline) (2026–present)

== Figure Skating ==
US Figure Skating

Year	Champion
2000	Miami University
2001	Miami University
2002	University of Delaware
2003	Cornell University
2004	Dartmouth College
2005	Dartmouth College
2006	Dartmouth College
2007	Dartmouth College
2008	Dartmouth College
2009	Boston University
2010	Boston University
2011	University of Delaware
2012	Dartmouth College
2013	University of Delaware
2014	University of Delaware
2015	University of Delaware
2016	University of Delaware
2017	Boston University
2018	Boston University
2019	Boston University
2022	Boston University
2023	Boston University
2024	University of Delaware
2025	Boston University
2026	Boston University

== Fishing ==
Bass Fishing (two-person team)

FLW Outdoors College Series

Year	Champion
2010	University of Florida
2011	University of Florida
2012	Kansas State University
2013	University of Louisiana-Monroe
2014	University of Minnesota
2015	University of South Carolina
2016	University of South Carolina
2017	Kansas State University
2018	University of Louisiana-Monroe
2019	Murray State University
2020	Stephen F. Austin
2021	Drury University
2022	East Texas Baptist University
2023	University of Montevallo
2024	Adrian College
2025	University of Montevallo

Bassmaster College Bass Fishing Series

Year	Champion
2005	Stephen F. Austin
2006	Arkansas Tech
2007	Virginia Tech
2008	Arkansas Little Rock
2009	North Carolina State
2010	Eastern Kentucky
2011	Stephen F. Austin
2012	Oklahoma State
2013	Auburn Montgomery (AUM)
2014	UNC Charlotte
2015	Texas A&M
2016	Kansas State
2017	Bryan College (TN)
2018	Bethel University
2019	Bethel University
2020	Bryan College
2021	Adrian College
2022	Coastal Carolina
2023	Auburn
2024	Lander University
2025	Lander University

Association of Collegiate Anglers, Cabela's Collegiate Bass Fishing Series

Year	Champion
2006	North Carolina State
2007	Texas A&M
2008	Arkansas
2009	Murray State
2010	Georgia
2011	UCF
2012	North Carolina State
2013	Bethel (TN)
2014	Georgia
2015	Northern Kentucky
2016	Auburn
2017	North Alabama
2018	Bethel
2019	Bethel
2020	Bryan College
2021	Texas Christian
2022	Wallace State
2023	Auburn
2024	North Alabama
2025	University of Montevallo
2026	Auburn University

Saltwater Fishing

An intercollegiate deep-sea fishing championship was held from 1956 through 1975 off of Wedgeport, Nova Scotia. Yale University won in 1956. Beginning in 1974, Coastal Carolina University has hosted an annual intercollegiate invitational fishing tournament.

== Flag Football ==
American Collegiate Intramural Sports and Fitness

Year	Men	Women	Co-Rec
1979	Central Florida		
1980	Louisiana State	Southeastern Louisiana	
1981	New Orleans	Louisiana State	
1982	New Orleans	Texas - Austin	
1983	New Orleans	Texas - Austin	
1984	Southeastern Louisiana	New Orleans	
1985	New Orleans	Texas - Austin	Northeast Louisiana
1986	New Orleans	Georgia Tech	West Virginia
1987	Southeastern Louisiana	New Orleans	Southwestern Louisiana
1988	Southern Mississippi	Georgia Tech	New Orleans
1989	Florida	Georgia Tech	Southeastern Louisiana
1990	Southeastern Louisiana	Georgia Southern	North Carolina State
1991	Southeastern Louisiana	New Orleans	North Carolina State
1992	Delgado Community College	Georgia Southern	Northeast Louisiana
1993	West Florida	Universidad Nacional Autonoma de Mexico	Northeast Louisiana
1994	South Florida	Florida	Louisiana State
1995	Southern University - New Orleans	Alabama	Northeast Louisiana
1996	Ohio State	Universidad Nacional Autonoma de Mexico	Nebraska
1997	Ohio State	Instituto Politecnico Nacional	Northeast Louisiana
1998	Delgado Community College	Instituto Politecnico Nacional	North Carolina State
1999	Nunez Community College	Instituto Politecnico Nacional	North Florida
2000	Nunez Community College	Instituto Politecnico Nacional	North Florida
2001	South Florida	Instituto Politecnico Nacional	Florida
2002	Southern University - Baton Rouge	Instituto Politecnico Nacional	Florida
2003	Nunez Community College	Stephen F. Austin State	Connecticut
2004	Georgia Southern	Southern University - Baton Rouge	Central Florida
2005	Pensacola Junior College	Sam Houston State	Tarleton State
2006	Iowa	West Florida	Louisiana - Monroe
2007	Florida	Florida A&M	North Carolina - Chapel Hill
2008	North Florida	West Florida	North Texas
2009	Central Florida	Florida A&M	North Carolina - Charlotte
2010	Kentucky	Florida A&M	Angelo State
2011	Florida	Florida A&M	Central Florida
2012	Kennesaw State	Florida A&M	Angelo State or Nebraska

National Intramural-Recreational Sports Association

Year	Men	Women	Co-Rec
2006-07	Texas-Pan American	Sam Houston State (TX)	University of West Florida
2007-08	North Carolina - Charlotte	Florida A&M	North Carolina - Charlotte
2008-09	Central Florida	Central Florida	Angelo State (TX)
2009-10	North Carolina A&T	Florida A&M	Central Florida
2010-11	North Carolina A&T	Florida A&M	Central Florida
2011-12	Central Florida	Florida A&M	Central Florida
2012-13	Nebraska	Florida A&M	Angelo State
2013-14	Kennesaw State (GA)	Central Florida	Angelo State
2014-15	Valdosta State (GA)	Central Florida	Valdosta State
2015-16	Valdosta State	Central Florida	Angelo State
2016-17	Valdosta State	Central Florida	Valdosta State
2017-18	Texas-San Antonio	Florida	Angelo State
2018-19	Texas-Rio Grande Valley	Florida	North Texas
2019-20	Georgia College	Florida	Dixie State
2021-22	South Texas	Central Florida	Central Florida
2022-23	Georgia College	Florida	University of Georgia
2023	Georgia College	Florida	University of Georgia
2024	South Texas	Florida	University of Georgia
2025	Georgia College	Florida	University of Georgia

== Flowboarding ==
These competitions were part of the CBS Sports "Collegiate Nationals" and "Alt Games" presentations.

Year	Champion
2007	individual
2008	Mesa College (CA)
2009	Mesa College
2010	?
2011	San Diego State

== Flying (Aviation) ==
National Intercollegiate Flying Association

- Aircraft type certificated as Airplane-Single Engine Land only.
- No more than four (4) place.
- Maximum horsepower-250 bhp.
- May not be equipped with an after-market short take-off and landing modification.
- Contestants acting as pilot-in-command in flying events must possess at least a Private Pilot certificate with appropriate category and class ratings.
- Contestants who hold or have ever held an Airline Transport Pilot certificate or have accumulated more than 1500 total flight hours are not eligible to compete.

Flying events:

- Power Off Landing
- Short Field Approach and Landing
- Navigation
- Message Drop
- IFR (Instrument Flight Rules) Precision Flight
- IFR Simulated Flight
- CRM/LOFT (Crew Resource Management/Line Oriented Flight Training)

SAFECON Championship Trophy

Year	Champion	Year	Champion	Year	Champion	Year	Champion	Year	Champion	Year	Champion	Year	Champion
1966	San Jose State	1976	Northeastern	1986	North Dakota	1996	North Dakota	2006	North Dakota	2016	Embry Riddle Aeronautical (Prescott)	2026	Southern Illinois
1967	Parks College of Saint Louis University	1977	Southern Illinois	1987	North Dakota	1997	Embry Riddle Aeronautical (Prescott)	2007	Embry Riddle Aeronautical (Prescott)	2017	Embry Riddle Aeronautical (Prescott)	2027	
1968	San Jose State	1978	Southern Illinois	1988	North Dakota	1998	Western Michigan	2008	Embry Riddle Aeronautical (Prescott)	2018	Embry Riddle Aeronautical (Prescott)		
1969	San Jose State	1979	Southern Illinois	1989	North Dakota	1999	Embry Riddle Aeronautical (Prescott)	2009	North Dakota	2019	North Dakota		
1970	Iowa State	1980	?	1990	North Dakota	2000	North Dakota	2010	North Dakota	2020	Cancelled		
1971	Oklahoma State	1981	Southern Illinois	1991	North Dakota	2001	North Dakota	2011	Southern Illinois	2021	Embry Riddle Aeronautical (Prescott)		
1972	Broward Junior College	1982	Southern Illinois	1992	Embry Riddle Aeronautical (Daytona)	2002	Western Michigan	2012	Embry Riddle Aeronautical (Prescott)	2022	Embry Riddle Aeronautical (Prescott)		
1973	Louisiana Tech	1983	Western Michigan	1993	Embry Riddle Aeronautical (Prescott)	2003	Embry Riddle Aeronautical (Prescott)	2013	Embry Riddle Aeronautical (Prescott)	2023	Embry Riddle Aeronautical (Prescott)		
1974	Southwest Missouri State	1984	Southern Illinois	1994	North Dakota	2004	North Dakota	2014	Southern Illinois	2024	North Dakota		
1975	Oklahoma State	1985	North Dakota	1995	North Dakota	2005	Embry Riddle Aeronautical (Prescott)	2015	Southern Illinois	2025	Embry Riddle Aeronautical (Prescott)		

== Handball (American) ==
US Handball Association

From 1953 to 1980 only a men's title was awarded. Women participated in a non-scoring method in 1980. From 1981 through 1986 women contributed to a combined team championship, the only title given. In 1987 two championships — a men's and a women's — were established. In 1988, the current men-women-combined championships were established.

Year	Men	Women	Overall
1953	Illinois-Navy Pier, University of Detroit (tie)		
1954	University of Detroit		
1955	University of Texas		
1956	University of Texas		
1957	University of Texas		
1958	Rensselaer Polytechnic Institute, Notre Dame (tie)		
1959	Rensselaer Polytechnic Institute		
1960	University of Texas		
1961	Michigan State		
1962	University of Minnesota		
1963	University of Texas		
1964	University of Texas		
1965	University of Texas		
1966	University of Texas		
1967	University of Texas		
1968	University of Texas		
1969	University of Miami (FL)		
1970	University of Texas		
1971	University of Texas, Lake Forest College (tie)		
1972	University of Texas		
1973	Montana		
1974	Lake Forest College (IL)		
1975	Lake Forest College		
1976	Lake Forest College		
1977	Memphis State		
1978	Lake Forest College		
1979	Lake Forest College		
1980	Lake Forest College		
1981			Lake Forest College, University of Texas (tie)
1982			Lake Forest College
1983			Lake Forest College
1984			Lake Forest College
1985			Texas A&M
1986			Memphis State
1987	Memphis State	University of Texas	--
1988	Memphis State	Texas A&M	Lake Forest College
1989	Memphis State	Texas A&M	Texas A&M
1990	Memphis State	Texas A&M	Texas A&M
1991	Memphis State	Texas A&M	Texas A&M
1992	Memphis State	Texas A&M	Texas A&M
1993	Memphis State	Southwest Missouri State	Southwest Missouri State
1994	Southwest Missouri State	Texas A&M	Southwest Missouri State
1995	Southwest Missouri State	Southwest Missouri State	Southwest Missouri State
1996	Southwest Missouri State	Southwest Missouri State	Southwest Missouri State
1997	Southwest Missouri State	Southwest Missouri State	Southwest Missouri State
1998	Lake Forest College	Southwest Missouri State	Southwest Missouri State
1999	Lake Forest College	Southwest Missouri State	Southwest Missouri State
2000	Lake Forest College	Southwest Missouri State	Lake Forest College
2001	Lake Forest College	Lake Forest College	Lake Forest College
2002	Texas A&M	Lake Forest College	Lake Forest College

Year	Men	Women	Overall	Division II
2003	Texas A&M	Lake Forest College	Lake Forest College	Hardin Simmons
2004	Dublin Institute of Technology	Lake Forest College	Southwest Missouri State	--
2005	Lake Forest College	Lake Forest College	Lake Forest College	Hardin Simmons
2006	Lake Forest College	Missouri State	Missouri State	Florida
2007	Missouri State	Lake Forest College	Lake Forest College	Southwestern University
2008	Missouri State	Missouri State	Missouri State	Florida
2009	Lake Forest College	Lake Forest College	Lake Forest College	Florida
2010	Lake Forest College	Lake Forest College	Lake Forest College	Minnesota State
2011	Lake Forest College	Lake Forest College	Lake Forest College	Minnesota State
2012	Lake Forest College	Lake Forest College	Lake Forest College	Angelo State
2013	Lake Forest College	Missouri State	Lake Forest College	Pacific University

Division I				Division II			Division III
Year	Men	Women	Combined	Men	Women	Combined	Men
2014	Lake Forest College	Missouri State	Lake Forest College	Michigan State	Western Washington	Pacific University (OR)	n/a
2015	Lake Forest College	Lake Forest College	Lake Forest College	Stony Brook University	Angelo State	Texas A&M	Dublin City University
Open Division				A Division			B Division
Year	Men	Women	Combined	Men	Women	Combined	Men
2016	University of Limerick (Ireland)	Texas	Lake Forest College	Texas A&M	Pacific University	Pacific University	Colorado School of Mines
2017	University of Limerick (Ireland)	Missouri State	Missouri State	Stony Brook University	Pacific University	Pacific University	Michigan State
2018	Lake Forest College	Missouri State	Missouri State	Pacific University	Pacific University	Pacific University	Minnesota
2019	Minnesota State	Missouri State	Missouri State	Minnesota			Texas A&M
2020	Missouri State	Missouri State	Missouri State	Arizona State	Pacific University		
2021	Cancelled			Cancelled			Cancelled
2022	Minnesota State	Missouri State	Minnesota State	Utah State	Utah State	Texas A&M	Angelo State
2023	Minnesota State	Missouri State	Minnesota State	Wisconsin-Milwaukee	Texas A&M	Utah State	Utah State
2024	Minnesota State	Minnesota State	Minnesota State	Texas A&M	Angelo State	Angelo State	—
2025	Minnesota State	Minnesota State	Minnesota State	Stony Brook	Pacific University	Texas A&M	—
2026	Minnesota State	Minnesota State	Minnesota State	Stony Brook	Stony Brook	Stony Brook	—

== Hurling ==
National Collegiate Gaelic Athletic Association

Year	Champion
2011	Indiana
2012	Purdue
2013	UC–Berkeley
2014	Montana–Missoula
2015	Montana–Missoula
2016	Connecticut
2017	Montana–Missoula
2018	Montana–Missoula
2019	Pitt
2020	Pitt
2022	Pitt
2023	Pitt
2024	Purdue
2025	Purdue
2026	Purdue

== Karate ==
=== ISKF Shotokan ===
National Collegiate Karate Association

Year	Kata	Kumite (Men)	Kumite (Women)
1980	New Orleans	New Orleans	
1981	Temple (PA)	Arizona State	
1982	Temple	Temple	
1983	Temple	Temple	
1984	Temple	U.C. Riverside	
1985	Temple	Temple	
1986	Temple	Temple	
1987	Temple	U.C. Riverside	
1988	Temple	Drexel (PA)	
1989	Drexel	Ohio State	
1990	Drexel	Arizona	
1991	Drexel	Mankato State (MN)	
1992	Alaska	Illinois	
1993	Delta State (MS)	Delta State	
1994	South Florida	Temple	
1995	South Florida	William & Mary (VA)	
1996	Temple	Temple	
1997	Northern Colorado	Drexel	
1998	Drexel	Drexel	Drexel
1999	Louisiana State	Louisiana State †	No women's team title
2000	Louisiana State	Louisiana State †	Tulane †
2001	Tulane (LA)	Drexel †	Penn State†
2002	Drexel	Louisiana State	Tulane
2003	Penn State	Tulane	Penn State
2004	Penn State	Louisiana State	Drexel
2005 ^{∗}	No tournament held		
2006	Alaska	Alaska	No women's team title
2007	Penn State	Penn State	Penn State
2008	Drexel	Drexel	Drexel
2009	Drexel	Drexel	Drexel
2010	Drexel	Ohio State	Minnesota
2011	Colorado	Ohio State	not held
2012	Drexel	^{¶}	^{¶}
2013	Ohio State	Penn State	Brown
2014	Mesa Community College	Mesa Community College	Salve Regina
2015	Drexel	Mesa Community College (AZ)^{‡}	
2016	Drexel	Brown	Salve Regina
2017	Brown	Brown	Salve Regina
2018	CU Denver	Brown	Salve Regina
2019	Brown	Brown^{‡}	
2022	Penn	Drexel	
2023	Ohio State	Ohio State	Ohio State

† In 1999, 2000 and 2001, the kumite competition included brown belts in addition to black belts.
^{∗} Hurricane Katrina caused cancellation.
^{¶} 2012 results do not mention team titles for kumite.
^{‡} Official results state that the championship title was for "Collegiate Team Kumite."

=== ITF Karate ===
Schools that follow the ITF standards typically use the Chang Hon forms.

Year	Champion
1983	
1985	Wake Forest (NC)
1987	

== Orienteering ==
US Orienteering Federation

Year and Champion	Year and Champion	Year and Champion	Year and Champion	Year and Champion	Year and Champion	Year and Champion
1973 Indiana Univ. of Pennsylvania	1981 US Military Academy	1989 US Military Academy	1997 US Military Academy	2005 US Military Academy	2013 US Military Academy	2021 Championship not held (COVID-19)
1974 Ohio University	1982 US Military Academy	1990 US Military Academy	1998 US Military Academy	2006 US Military Academy	2014 US Military Academy	2022 US Military Academy
1975 Indiana Univ. of Pennsylvania	1983 Kansas	1991 Bates College (ME)	1999 US Military Academy	2007 US Military Academy	2015 US Military Academy	2023 Washington
1976 Indiana Univ. of Pennsylvania	1984 Kansas	1992 US Military Academy	2000 US Military Academy	2008 US Military Academy	2016 US Military Academy	2024 Montana
1977 Lake Superior State University (MI)	1985 US Military Academy	1993 Washington	2001 New Hampshire	2009 US Military Academy	2017 US Military Academy	2025 US Military Academy
1978 US Military Academy	1986 US Military Academy	1994 Washington	2002 Washington	2010 US Military Academy	2018 US Military Academy	2026
1979 US Military Academy	1987 US Military Academy	1995 US Military Academy	2003 US Military Academy	2011 US Military Academy	2019 US Military Academy	2027
1980 US Military Academy	1988 US Military Academy	1996 US Military Academy	2004 US Military Academy	2012 US Military Academy	2020 Championship not held (COVID-19)	2028

== Paintball ==
Beginning with the 2011 championship, the Division AA competition switched to the Race To-2 format. Division A format is X-Ball.

National Collegiate Paintball Association

Year	Division A	Division AA
2000	Illinois	
2001	Illinois	
2002	Illinois	
2003	Illinois	
2004	Purdue	
2005	Illinois	Arizona State
2006	Connecticut	UC Irvine
2007	Connecticut	Eastern Illinois
2008	Illinois State	Long Beach State
2009	Purdue	Wisconsin–Whitewater
2010	Drexel	East Tennessee State
2011	Tennessee	SUNY–Buffalo
2012	Long Beach State	Florida Gulf Coast
2013	Florida Gulf Coast	Wisconsin–Platteville
2014	Central Florida	North Carolina State
2015	Florida Atlantic	East Carolina
2016	Texas A&M	Wisconsin–Platteville
2017	Central Florida	South Florida
2018	Liberty	South Florida
2019	Drexel	Wisconsin-Milwaukee
2024	Embry-Riddle	
2025	Embry-Riddle	
2026	Virginia Tech	

== Parachuting ==
US Parachute Association

The USPA National Collegiate Parachute Championships consist of both individual and team events. Individual events are classic accuracy, sport accuracy and freefall style. The team events are classic accuracy and formation diving (and before 2007, 2-person freefly diving). Schools other than the service academies have been competitive only in sport accuracy and freefly diving. In the Team Accuracy and Formation Skydiving events, multiple yearly entrants from the service academies have dominated. For example, in 2008, 6 USMA and 4 USAFA teams placed in the top 10 in team accuracy.

== Pickleball ==
DUPR/United Pickleball Association

Year	Champion
2022	North Carolina
2023	Virginia
2024	Utah Tech
2025	Texas
2026	Florida Atlantic

National Collegiate Pickleball Association

Year	Champion
2024	Utah Tech
2025	Utah Valley
2026	Florida Atlantic

Association of Pickleball Players

Year	Champion
2024	Utah Tech
2025	Florida
2026	Florida Atlantic

== Pistol ==
National Rifle Association

Year	Free Pistol	Standard Pistol	Air Pistol	Air Pistol (W)	Sport Pistol (W)	Aggregate-Open	Aggregate (W)
1981	Navy	Army	Army				
1982	Navy	Air Force	Air Force				
1983	Navy	Navy	Air Force				
1984	Navy	Texas–Arlington	Texas–Arlington				
1985	Navy	Army	Navy				
1986	Army	MIT	MIT			Army	
1987	Navy	The Citadel	Navy	individual		Navy	
1988	MIT	Navy	Navy	individual		Navy	
1989	Air Force	Army	Navy	individual		Army	
1990	Navy	Navy	Oregon State	individual		Navy	
1991	Army	Navy	Navy	individual		Army	
1992	Navy	Navy	Navy	individual		Navy	
1993	Navy	Navy	Navy	individual	individual	Navy	
1994	Army	Air Force	The Citadel	Coast Guard	Coast Guard	Air Force	
1995	Navy	Navy	Navy	Navy	Navy	Navy	
1996	Navy	Navy	Army	MIT	MIT	Navy	
1997	Army	Navy	Navy	Army	Coast Guard	Army	
1998	Army	Navy	Army	MIT	Navy	Army	
1999	Air Force	Ohio State	Navy	MIT	Ohio State	Army	
2000	Ohio State	Ohio State	Navy	Ohio State	Ohio State	Ohio State	
2001	Ohio State	Navy	Army	Coast Guard	Coast Guard	Navy	Coast Guard
2002	Navy	Coast Guard	Coast Guard	MIT	Ohio State	Navy	Coast Guard
2003	The Citadel	Navy	Navy	Navy	Navy	Navy	Navy
2004	Navy	Army	Navy	Ohio State	Ohio State	Navy	Ohio State
2005	MIT	Ohio State	MIT	Ohio State	Ohio State	MIT	Ohio State
2006	Army	Utah	Army	Army	MIT	Army	Coast Guard
2007	Army	Navy	MIT	Ohio State	Navy	MIT	Navy
2008	Navy	Navy	Navy	Ohio State	Army	Navy	Army
2009	MIT	Army	Ohio State	Ohio State	Ohio State	Army	Ohio State
2010	Army	Army	Army	Navy	Navy	Army	Navy
2011	Ohio State	Army	Army	Navy	Navy	Army	Navy
2012	Navy	Army	Navy	Navy	Navy	Navy	Navy
2013	Navy	The Citadel	Army	Army	Navy	Army	Navy
2014	Navy	Ohio State	Army	MIT	Ohio State	Ohio State	MIT
2015	Utah	Ohio State	Utah	North Dakota State	MIT	Ohio State	MIT
2016	Ohio State	Ohio State	The Citadel	MIT	MIT	Ohio State	MIT
2017	Army	Coast Guard	Army	Coast Guard	Ohio State	Ohio State	Ohio State
2018	Ohio State	Ohio State	Ohio State	Coast Guard	Coast Guard	Ohio State	Coast Guard
2019	Coast Guard	Coast Guard	Ohio State	Navy	MIT	Coast Guard	MIT

== Polo (Arena) ==
US Polo Association

Year	Men	Year	Men	Year	Men	Year	Men	Year	Men	Women	Year	Men	Women	Year	Men	Women	Year	Men	Women	Year	Men	Women
19??	?	1932	Yale	1951	Miami	1963	Cornell	1975	UC Davis	?	1987	Virginia	Cornell	1999	Colorado State	Virginia	2011	Virginia	Cornell	2025	Texas A&M	Texas A&M
1921	Princeton	1933	Harvard	1952	New Mexico Military Institute	1964		1976	Xavier University	Yale	1988	Virginia	Cornell	2000	Texas A&M	Cornell	2012	Virginia	Virginia	2026	North Texas	South Carolina-Aiken
1922	Princeton	1934	Princeton	1953		1965		1977	Xavier University		1989		Skidmore	2001	Texas A&M	Cornell	2013	Westmont College (CA)	Virginia	2027		
1923	Yale	1935	US Military Academy	1954	New Mexico Military Institute	1966	Cornell	1978			1990	Colorado State	Virginia	2002	Virginia	Cornell	2014	Westmont College	Virginia	2028		
1924	Yale	1936	US Military Academy	1955	Cornell	1967		1979	UC Davis	Cornell	1991	Colorado State	Cornell	2003	Virginia	Cornell	2015	Colorado State	Cornell	2029		
1925	Yale	1937	Cornell	1956	Cornell	1968		1980			1992	Cornell	Virginia	2004	Virginia	Cornell	2016	Texas A&M	Cornell	2030		
1926	Yale	1938	Yale	1957	Yale	1969		1981			1993	Virginia	Virginia	2005	Cornell	Connecticut	2017	Roger Williams	Virginia	2031		
1927	Yale	19??	?	1958	Cornell	1970		1982			1994	Virginia	Texas A&M	2006	Texas Tech	Connecticut	2018	Texas A&M	Texas A&M	2032		
1928	Pennsylvania Military College	1947	?	1959	Cornell	1971	Yale	1983			1995	Virginia	Texas A&M	2007	Texas A&M	Connecticut	2019	Texas A&M	Texas A&M	2033		
1929	Harvard	1948	Miami (FL)	1960		1972	Connecticut	1984		Cornell	1996	Texas A&M	Connecticut	2008	Texas A&M	Connecticut	2022	Virginia	Virginia	2034		
1930	Princeton	1949	Miami	1961	Cornell	1973	Connecticut	1985		Cornell	1997	Texas A&M	Connecticut	2009	Virginia	Virginia	2023	North Texas	Texas A&M	2035		
1931	Yale	1950	Miami	1962	Cornell	1974	Connecticut	1986	Yale	Cornell	1998	Texas A&M	Connecticut	2010	Texas A&M	Virginia	2024	North Texas	Virginia	2036		

== Powerboating (Outboards) ==
Year	Champion	Year	Champion
1930	Colgate	1935	Yale
1931	Dartmouth	1936	Dartmouth
1932	Yale (Eastern), Occidental (Pacific Coast)	1937	Princeton
1933	Rutgers	1938	Princeton
1934	Rutgers	19??	?

== Powerlifting ==
Earlier national collegiate powerlifting championships are known to have been held during 1969 (at Florida State) and 1976 (at Ohio University).

USA Powerlifting/American Drug Free Powerlifting Association

Year	Men	Year	Women	Year	Combined
1978 AAU	Louisiana Tech				
1979 AAU	?				
1980 AAU	?				
1981	Kutztown				
1982	Kutztown				
1983	Texas A&M	1983	?	1983	?
1984 USPF	?	1984	Louisiana Tech	1984	?
1985 USPF	Louisiana Tech	1985	Louisiana Tech	1985	Louisiana Tech
1986 USPF	Louisiana Tech	1986	Louisiana Tech	1986	Louisiana Tech
1987	?	1987	?	1987	?
1988	?	1988	?	1988	?
1989	?	1989	?	1989	?
1990	?	1990	?	1990	?
1991 ADFPA	Purdue	1991	Purdue	1991	Texas A&M
1992 ADFPA	Texas	1992	Texas	1992	Texas A&M
1993 ADFPA	East Stroudsburg	1993	East Stroudsburg	1993	Texas A&M
1994 ADFPA	Evansville	1994 (A)	Texas	1994 (A)	Texas
1994 USPF	Louisiana Tech	1994 (U)	Louisiana Tech	1994 (U)	Louisiana Tech
1995 ADFPA	Evansville	1995 (A)	Texas	1995 (A)	Texas
1995 USPF	Louisiana Tech	1995 (U)	Louisiana Tech	1995 (U)	Louisiana Tech
1996	Louisiana Tech	1996	Louisiana Tech	1996	Louisiana Tech
1997	Louisiana Tech	1997	Louisiana Tech	1997	Louisiana Tech
1998	Louisiana Tech	1998	Louisiana Tech	1998	Louisiana Tech
1999	Louisiana Tech	1999	Louisiana Tech	1999	Louisiana Tech
2000	Louisiana Tech	2000	Louisiana Tech	2000	Louisiana Tech
2001	Louisiana Tech	2001	Louisiana Tech	2001	Louisiana Tech
2002	Louisiana Tech	2002	Louisiana Tech	2002	Louisiana Tech
2003	Louisiana Tech	2003	Louisiana Tech	2003	Louisiana Tech
2004	Louisiana Tech	2004	Nicholls State	2004	Louisiana Tech
2005	Louisiana Tech	2005	Nicholls State	2005	Louisiana Tech
2006	Louisiana Tech	2006	Louisiana Tech	2006	Louisiana Tech
2007	LSU	2007	Louisiana Tech	2007	LSU
2008	Louisiana Tech	2008	LSU	2008	Louisiana Tech
2009	Louisiana–Lafayette	2009	LSU	2009	LSU
2010	Louisiana Tech	2010	Texas A&M	2010	LSU
2011	Louisiana–Lafayette	2011	LSU	2011	Official results after 2010 do not show combined titles.
2012	LSU	2012	Louisiana–Lafayette	2012	Official results after 2010 do not show combined titles.
2013	Texas	2013	LSU	2013	Official results after 2010 do not show combined titles.
2014	Texas	2014	UTSA	2014	Official results after 2010 do not show combined titles.
2015	Texas A&M	2015	UTSA	2015	Official results after 2010 do not show combined titles.
2016 *	UTSA (open); U.S. Military Academy (raw)	2016	Texas (open); Northeastern (raw)	2016	Official results after 2010 do not show combined titles.
2017	Louisiana Tech (equipped); Texas A&M Kingsville (raw)	2017	UTSA (equipped); Rutgers (raw)	2017	Official results after 2010 do not show combined titles.
2018	UTSA (equipped); Midland (raw)	2018	Texas (equipped); Rutgers (raw)	2018	Official results after 2010 do not show combined titles.
2019	UTSA (equipped); Midland (raw)	2019	Texas A&M (equipped); Midland (raw)	2019	Official results after 2010 do not show combined titles.
2020	Midland (equipped); Midland (raw)	2020	Midland (equipped); Midland (raw)	2020	Official results after 2010 do not show combined titles.
2021	Midland (equipped); Midland (raw)	2021	Midland (equipped); Midland (raw)	2021	Official results after 2010 do not show combined titles.

* In addition to the traditional equipped divisions, raw divisions were inaugurated for both men and women in 2016, with 12 women's and 14 men's teams entering the raw team competition.

World Association of Benchers and Deadlifters

Year	Champion
2008	University of Houston-Downtown
2009	University of Houston-Downtown
2010	University of Houston-Downtown

== Racquetball ==
US Racquetball Association
Division I and II championship competitions were separated in 2005.

Year	Men	Women	Year	Men	Women	Year	Men	Women	Overall	Year	Men	Women	Overall
1973	Illinois		1989	Memphis State	Sacramento State	2004	Colorado State–Pueblo	Utah	Alabama	2022	Missouri	Missouri	Missouri
1974	Tennessee		1990	Memphis State	Memphis State	2005	Colorado State–Pueblo	Alabama	Alabama	2023	Oregon State	Baldwin-Wallace	Oregon State
1975	Memphis State (Note: Dropped "State" from its name in 1994.)	Memphis State	1991	SW Missouri State	SW Missouri State	2006	Colorado State–Pueblo	Oregon State	Oregon State	2024	Oregon State	BYU	Oregon State
1976	Illinois	Memphis State	1992	SW Missouri State	SW Missouri State	2007	Colorado State–Pueblo	Arizona State	Alabama	2025	Oregon State	Oregon State	Oregon State
1977	Memphis State	Memphis State	1993	SW Missouri State	SW Missouri State	2008	Colorado State–Pueblo	BYU	Oregon State	2026	BYU	Oregon State	Oregon State
1978	Memphis State	Memphis State	1994	SW Missouri State	Memphis State	2009	Colorado State–Pueblo	Oregon State	Oregon State				
1979	Memphis State	Memphis State	1995	Nichols (MA)	BYU	2010	Colorado State–Pueblo	Oregon State	Oregon State				
1980	Memphis State	Memphis State	1996	Southern Colorado (Note: Became Colorado State–Pueblo in 2003.)	BYU	2011	Colorado State–Pueblo	Oregon State	Oregon State				
1981	Memphis State (team II)	Memphis State	1997	Florida	BYU	2012	Colorado State–Pueblo	Oregon State	Oregon State				
1982	Memphis State	Florida	1998	Southern Colorado	BYU	2013	Oregon State	Oregon State	Oregon State				
1983	Memphis State	Memphis State	1999	Southern Colorado	BYU	2014	Colorado State–Pueblo	Oregon State	Oregon State				
1984	Memphis State	Memphis State	2000	Memphis	BYU	2015	Oregon State	Missouri	Oregon State				
1985	Memphis State	Memphis State	2001	Baldwin–Wallace	Texas	2016	Baldwin–Wallace	Oregon State	Oregon State				
1986	Memphis State	Sacramento State	2002	Baldwin–Wallace	BYU	2017	Baldwin-Wallace	Oregon State	Oregon State				
1987	Memphis State	Sacramento State	2003	Memphis	BYU	2018	Colorado State–Pueblo	BYU	Colorado State–Pueblo				
1988	Memphis State	Sacramento State	2003	Memphis	BYU	2019	Oregon State	Colorado State–Pueblo	Colorado State–Pueblo				

Division II

Year	Men	Women	Overall
2005	Utah Valley State	Clarkson	Clarkson
2006	Clarkson	Baldwin–Wallace	Baldwin–Wallace
2007	Baldwin–Wallace	Baldwin–Wallace	Baldwin–Wallace
2008			Bryant
2009			Clarkson
2010			RPI
2011	Baldwin–Wallace	Clarkson	Clarkson
2012	Baldwin–Wallace	Baldwin–Wallace	Baldwin–Wallace
2013	Baldwin–Wallace	Shenandoah	Baldwin–Wallace
2014	Baldwin–Wallace	Baldwin–Wallace	Baldwin–Wallace
2015	Western Health Sciences	Baldwin–Wallace	RPI
2016	RIT	Baldwin–Wallace	RPI

== Rodeo ==
National Intercollegiate Rodeo Association

During 1960, the NIRA split into two organizations: the American Collegiate Rodeo Association (ACRA) with 13 member schools and the parent NIRA. The two reunited in 1961.

Men

Year and Champion	Year and Champion	Year and Champion	Year and Champion	Year and Champion	Year and Champion	Year and Champion	Year and Champion
1949 Sul Ross State College (TX)	1960 California Poly, San Luis Obispo	1971 Cal Poly, San Luis Obispo	1982 Sul Ross State	1993 Southwestern Oklahoma State	2004 Oklahoma Panhandle State	2015 Tarleton State	2026 Clarendon College (TX)
1950 Sul Ross State College	1961 Wyoming	1972 Montana State	1983 Sul Ross State	1994 Vernon Regional Jr. College (TX)	2005 Tarleton State	2016 Feather River College (CA)	2027
1951 Sul Ross State College	1962 Sul Ross State College	1973 Cal Poly, San Luis Obispo	1984 Southwest Texas State	1995 Montana State	2006 West Texas A&M	2017 Oklahoma Panhandle State	2028
1952 Sul Ross State College	1963 Casper College (WY)	1974 Eastern New Mexico	1985 Southwestern Oklahoma State	1996 College of Southern Idaho	2007 Ranger College (TX)	2018 Oklahoma Panhandle State	2029
1953 Hardin-Simmons (TX)	1964 Casper College	1975 Montana State	1986 Western Texas College	1997 Oklahoma Panhandle State	2008 Walla Walla Community College (WA)	2019 Panola College (TX)	2030
1954 Colorado A&M	1965 Casper College	1976 Southeastern Oklahoma State	1987 Blue Mountain Community College (OR)	1998 Oklahoma Panhandle State	2009 Western Texas College	2020 No CNFR (COVID-19 restrictions)	2031
1955 Texas Tech	1966 Casper College	1977 Southeastern Oklahoma State	1988 Montana State-Bozeman	1999 Southwestern Oklahoma State	2010 Vernon College	2021 Clarendon College (TX)	2032
1956 Sam Houston State College (TX)	1967 Tarleton State College (TX)	1978 Southeastern Oklahoma State	1989 Odessa College (TX)	2000 Oklahoma Panhandle State	2011 Sam Houston State	2022 Tarleton State	2033
1957 McNeese State College (LA)	1968 Sam Houston State College	1979 Southeastern Oklahoma State	1990 Montana State-Bozeman	2001 College of Southern Idaho	2012 Walla Walla Community College	2023 Clarendon College	2034
1958 McNeese State College	1969 Eastern New Mexico	1980 Southeastern Oklahoma State	1991 Montana State-Bozeman	2002 College of Southern Idaho	2013 Oklahoma Panhandle State	2024 Tarleton State	2035
1959 McNeese State College	1970 Cal Poly, San Luis Obispo	1981 Dawson Community College (MT)	1992 Southwestern Oklahoma State	2003 Vernon College	2014 Tennessee-Martin	2025 Tarleton State	2036

Women

Year and Champion	Year and Champion	Year and Champion	Year and Champion	Year and Champion	Year and Champion	Year and Champion	Year and Champion
1961 Sam Houston St. Teacher’s College (TX)	1970 Tarleton State College (TX)	1979 Central Arizona College	1988 Southwestern Oklahoma State	1997 Weber State (UT)	2006 Weber State	2015 Blue Mountain Community College (OR)	2024 West Alabama
1962 Sul Ross State College (TX)	1971 Tarleton State College	1980 Southeastern Oklahoma State	1989 Cal Poly, San Luis Obispo	1998 Lewis-Clark State College (ID)	2007 Wyoming	2016 Blue Mountain Community College	2025 Southwest Texas College
1963 Colorado State	1972 Eastern New Mexico	1981 Eastern New Mexico	1990 Wyoming	1999 Nevada-Las Vegas	2008 Nevada-Las Vegas	2017 Sam Houston State	2026 Texas A&M
1964 Colorado State	1973 Arizona	1982 Southeastern Oklahoma State	1991 Wyoming	2000 Western Texas College	2009 Wyoming	2018 McNeese State	2027
1965 Sam Houston State College	1974 Sam Houston State	1983 Eastern New Mexico	1992 Walla Walla Community College (WA)	2001 Oklahoma State	2010 Gillette College (WY)	2019 McNeese State	2028
1966 Arizona State	1975 New Mexico State	1984 Sam Houston State	1993 Wyoming	2002 Texas A&M	2011 Montana State	2020 No CNFR (COVID-19 restrictions)	2029
1967 Eastern New Mexico	1976 New Mexico State	1985 Sul Ross State	1994 Southwestern Oklahoma State	2003 Vernon College (TX)	2012 Texas Tech - Lubbock	2021 Montana State	2030
1968 Sam Houston State College	1977 Utah State	1986 Montana State	1995 Southeastern Oklahoma State	2004 Oklahoma State	2013 Idaho State	2022 Weatherford College	2031
1969 Tarleton State College (TX)	1978 Central Arizona College	1987 Scottsdale Community College (AZ)	1996 Southeastern Oklahoma State	2005 Tarleton State	2014 Central Arizona	2023 University of West Alabama	2032

== Roller Hockey, Inline ==
National Collegiate Inline Hockey Association (1996–98)

Collegiate Roller Hockey League (1999 through 7/31/2003)

National Collegiate Roller Hockey Association (8/1/2003 - )

Year	Champion	Year	Division II Champion	Year	Division III Champion	Year	Junior College Champion
1996	El Camino College (CA)						
1997	Saddleback College (CA)						
1998	Missouri-St. Louis						
Division I
1999	Michigan State					1999	Grossmont College (CA)
2000	Michigan State					2000	St. Charles Comm. College (MO)
2001	Rochester IT	2001	Eastern Michigan			2001	St. Charles CC
2002	Lindenwood (MO)	2002	Illinois State			2002	St. Charles CC
2003	Lindenwood (Premier Div.); Cal Poly Pomona (Competitive Div.)	2003	SUNY Binghamton			2003	St. Charles CC
2004	Lindenwood	2004	Missouri - St. Louis	2004	Lindenwood	2004	St. Charles CC
2005	Lindenwood	2005	Nevada	2005	Lindenwood	2005	St. Charles CC
2006	Lindenwood	2006	Neumann College (PA)	2006	Lindenwood	2006	Riverside CC (CA)
2007	Lindenwood	2007	Stony Brook	2007	Lindenwood	2007	St. Charles CC
2008	Lindenwood	2008	Neumann College (PA)	2008	Lindenwood	2008	Broward CC (FL)
2009	Missouri-St. Louis	2009	Grand Valley State (MI)	2009	Lindenwood	2009	St. Charles CC
2010	Lindenwood	2010	West Chester (PA)	2010	Penn State	2010	St. Charles CC
2011	Long Beach State (CA)	2011	Miami (FL)	2011	Lindenwood	2011	St. Charles CC
2012	Bethel (TN)	2012	Central Michigan	2012	Lindenwood	2012	St. Charles CC
2013	Lindenwood	2013	Colorado at Colorado Springs	2013	Lindenwood	2013	St. Charles CC
2014	Lindenwood	2014	California State University, Fullerton	2014	Lindenwood	2014	St. Charles CC
2015	Neumann University	2015	Farmingdale State College	2015	Lindenwood	2015	St. Charles CC
2016	Neumann University	2016	Massachusetts	2016	Lindenwood	2016	St. Charles CC
2017	Farmingdale State	2017	Cal State Fullerton	2017	Lindenwood	2017	West Valley College
2018	Farmingdale State	2018	RIT	2018	Lindenwood	2018	Saddleback College
2019	Farmingdale State	2019	Cal State Fullerton	2019	Endicott	2019	St. Louis CC
2021	Slippery Rock	2021		2021		2021	
2022	Lindenwood	2022	Michigan State	2022	Ohio State	2022	Henry Ford College
2023	Lindenwood	2023	Ohio State	2023	Neumann		
2024	Grand Canyon	2024	Arizona	2024	Yeshiva		
2025	Lindenwood	2025	Neumann	2025	Colorado		
2026	Lindenwood	2026	Stony Brook	2026	Purdue		

== Rowing ==
=== Varsity Openweight Eights ===
Men
Rowing Association of American Colleges
The RAAC was the first collegiate athletic organization in the United States.

Year	Champion	Event	Year	Champion	Event	Year	Champion	Event	Year	Champion	Event
1871	Mass. Agricultural College	6s	1877			1883	Cornell	4s	1889	Cornell	8s
1872	Amherst	6s	1878			1884	Pennsylvania	4s	1890	Cornell	8s
1873	Yale	6s	1879	Columbia	4s	1885	Cornell	4s	1891	Cornell	8s
1874	Columbia	6s	1880	Cornell	4s	1886	Bowdoin	4s	1892	Cornell	8s
1875	Cornell	6s	1881			1887	Cornell	4s	1893	Cornell	8s
1876	Cornell	6s	1882	Pennsylvania	4s	1888	Yale	8s	1894	Cornell	8s

Intercollegiate Rowing Association

Year and Champion	Year and Champion	Year and Champion	Year and Champion	Year and Champion	Year and Champion	Year and Champion
1895 Columbia	1913 Syracuse	1932 California	1951 Wisconsin	1970 Washington	1989 Pennsylvania	2008 Wisconsin
1896 Cornell	1914 Columbia	1933 not held *	1952 Navy	1971 Cornell	1990 Wisconsin	2009 Washington
1897 (a) Cornell	1915 Cornell	1934 California	1953 Navy	1972 Pennsylvania	1991 Northeastern	2010 California
1897 (b) Cornell	1916 Syracuse	1935 California	1954 Winner disqualified †	1973 Wisconsin	1992 Dartmouth, Navy, Penn (tie)	2011 Washington
1898 Pennsylvania	1917 - not held	1936 Washington	1955 Cornell	1974 Wisconsin	1993 Brown	2012 Washington
1899 Pennsylvania	1918 - not held	1937 Washington	1956 Cornell	1975 Wisconsin	1994 Brown	2013 Washington
1900 Pennsylvania	1919 - not held	1938 Navy	1957 Cornell	1976 California	1995 Brown	2014 Washington
1901 Cornell	1920 Syracuse	1939 California	1958 Cornell	1977 Cornell	1996 Princeton	2015 Washington
1902 Cornell	1921 Navy	1940 Washington	1959 Wisconsin	1978 Syracuse	1997 Washington	2016 California
1903 Cornell	1922 Navy	1941 Washington	1960 California	1979 Brown	1998 Princeton	2017 Yale
1904 Syracuse	1923 Washington	1942 - not held	1961 California	1980 Navy	1999 California	2018 Yale
1905 Cornell	1924 Washington	1943 - not held	1962 Cornell	1981 Cornell	2000 California	2019 Yale
1906 Cornell	1925 Navy	1944 - not held	1963 Cornell	1982 Cornell	2001 California	2020 cancelled (pandemic)
1907 Cornell	1926 Washington	1945 - not held	1964 California	1983 Brown	2002 California	2021 Washington
1908 Syracuse	1927 Columbia	1946 - not held	1965 Navy	1984 Navy	2003 Harvard	2022 California
1909 Cornell	1928 California	1947 Navy	1966 Wisconsin	1985 Princeton	2004 Harvard	2023 California
1910 Cornell	1929 Columbia	1948 Washington	1967 Pennsylvania	1986 Brown	2005 Harvard	2024 Washington
1911 Cornell	1930 Cornell	1949 California	1968 Pennsylvania	1987 Brown	2006 California	2025 Washington
1912 Cornell	1931 Navy	1950 Washington	1969 Pennsylvania	1988 Northeastern	2007 Washington	2026 Washington

* Not held in 1933 due to the Depression. However, the first college 2000-meter national championship ever held was conducted by local businessmen on the Olympic course in Long Beach, California, as a substitute. Washington raced both Harvard and Yale for the first time at this event and defeated Yale by eight feet to win the championship. Washington counts this victory among its string of Men’s National Varsity Eight Championships.

† Navy was disqualified from the IRA Regatta for use of an ineligible coxswain. Trophies won by Navy were forfeited and not awarded. Cornell finished second.

Women
(Results for 2V8 and Novice 8 are included for completeness due to the paucity of events conducted.)

Year	Varsity 8 John Murphy Trophy	Second Varsity 8	Novice 8
1997	Boston University	Boston College	Radcliffe
1998	Wisconsin	Wisconsin	Cornell
1999	Kansas	Yale	not held

=== Varsity Fours ===
Year	Varsity 4 with cox	Varsity 4 without cox	Year	Varsity 4 with cox	Varsity 4 without cox	Year	Varsity 4 with cox	Varsity 4 without cox	Year	Varsity 4 with cox	Year	Varsity 4 with cox
1968	Cornell		1981	Syracuse	Cornell	1995	Temple	Brown	2009	California	2023	California
1968	Cornell		1982	Wisconsin	Pennsylvania	1996	Minnesota	Navy	2010	Washington	2024	Washington
1969	Rutgers		1983	Wisconsin	Wisconsin	1997	Minnesota	Brown	2011	Washington	2025	Washington
1970	Rutgers		1984	Temple	Princeton	1998	Minnesota	Wisconsin	2012	Washington	2026	California
1971	Navy		1985	Princeton	Navy	1999	Wisconsin	Wisconsin	2013	Washington		
1972	UCLA		1986	Wisconsin	Princeton	2000	Wisconsin	Wisconsin	2014	Washington		
1973	UCLA		1987	Wisconsin	Navy	2001	California	Wisconsin	2015	Washington		
1974	Coast Guard	Coast Guard	1988	Brown	Navy	2002	California	Wisconsin	2016	Washington		
1975	Oregon State	Wisconsin	1989	Navy	Pennsylvania	2003	Washington	Wisconsin	2017	Washington		
1976	Navy	Wisconsin	1990	Wisconsin	not awarded	2004	Washington	Colgate	2018	Not contested due to weather		
1977	Princeton	Pennsylvania	1991	Georgetown	Navy	2005	Stanford	Army	2019	Washington		
1978	Coast Guard	Oregon State	1992	Navy	Georgetown	2006	Stanford	Harvard	2020	cancelled (pandemic)		
1979	Washington State	Pennsylvania	1993	Georgetown	Navy	2007	California	Navy	2021	Washington		
1980	Wisconsin	Dartmouth	1994	Brown	Brown	2008	Washington	Yale	2022	Princeton		

=== Varsity Lightweight Eights ===
Intercollegiate Rowing Association
Men

Year and Champion	Year and Champion	Year and Champion	Year and Champion	Year and Champion	Year and Champion
1987 Yale	1995 Harvard	2002 Yale	2009 Princeton	2016 Columbia	2023 Princeton
1988/1989 Princeton	1996 Princeton	2003 Harvard	2010 Princeton	2017 Cornell	2024 Harvard
1990 Yale	1997 Harvard	2004 Navy	2011 Yale	2018 Columbia	2025 Harvard
1991 Harvard	1998 Princeton	2005 Yale	2012 Harvard	2019 Cornell	2026 Harvard
1992 Cornell	1999 Harvard	2006 Cornell	2013 Harvard	2020 cancelled (pandemic)	
1993 Harvard	2000 Yale	2007 Cornell	2014 Cornell	2021 Navy	
1994 Princeton	2001 Harvard	2008 Cornell	2015 Cornell	2022 Columbia	

Women

Year and Champion	Year and Champion	Year and Champion	Year and Champion	Year and Champion	Year and Champion
1997 Radcliffe (MA)	2002 Princeton	2007 Bucknell (PA)	2012 Stanford	2017 Stanford	2022 Princeton
1998 Villanova (PA)	2003 Princeton	2008 Wisconsin	2013 Stanford	2018 Stanford	2023 Princeton
1999 Princeton	2004 Wisconsin	2009 Wisconsin	2014 Radcliffe	2019 Stanford	2024 Princeton
2000 Princeton	2005 Wisconsin	2010 Stanford	2015 Stanford	2020 cancelled (pandemic)	2025 Princeton
2001 Princeton	2006 Wisconsin	2011 Stanford	2016 Stanford	2021 Princeton	2026 Princeton

=== Lightweight Four/Double ===
Intercollegiate Rowing Association
Men's Varsity Lightweight Four

Year	Champion (with coxswain)	Champion (without coxswain, "straight four")
2011	Harvard	
2012	Navy	
2013	Harvard	
2014	Columbia	
2015	Yale	Princeton
2016	Georgetown	Cornell
2017	Navy	Harvard
2018 (cancelled)	best in heats: Georgetown	best in heats: Navy
2019	Navy	Navy
2020	cancelled	(pandemic)
2021	not held	Navy
2022	Navy	
2023	Georgetown	
2024	Georgetown	
2025	Georgetown	
2026	Penn	

Women's Varsity
Lightweight Four
(with coxswain)

Year and Champion
2007 Princeton
2008 Loyola (Maryland)
2009 not held
2010 Loyola
2011 Wisconsin
2012 Wisconsin
2013 Wisconsin
2014 Wisconsin
2015 Stanford
2016 Wisconsin
2017 Stanford
2018 Stanford (Result from Race for Lanes holds due to poor weather)
2019 Stanford
2020 cancelled (pandemic)
2021 Stanford
2022 MIT
2023 Princeton
2024 Stanford
2025 Princeton
2026 Princeton

Women's Varsity
Lightweight Double Scull

Year and Champion
2015 Wisconsin
2016 Boston University
2017 Stanford
2018 cancelled (best in heats: Princeton)
2019 Boston University
2020 cancelled (pandemic)
2021 Boston University
2022 Princeton
2023 Princeton
2024 Boston University
2025 Boston University
2026 Boston University

=== Overall Points ===
Intercollegiate Rowing Association

Men
The IRA awards the Jim Ten Eyck Trophy, named in honor of Syracuse's rowing coach (1903–1938), to the team that accumulates the most points during the IRA Championship Regatta in a system based on the finishing places of three eights crews. From 1952 through 1973, the winning team was the one with the most points in the varsity, junior varsity and freshman eights. Starting in 1974, all races counted in the scoring under a system adopted by the coaches of the Eastern Association of Rowing Colleges. More recently, the scoring system was revised to include only three of the four possible eights from each school in the points standings.

Year and Champion	Year and Champion	Year and Champion	Year and Champion	Year and Champion	Year and Champion	Year and Champion	Year and Champion
1952 Navy	1962 Cornell	1972 Wisconsin	1982 Navy	1992 Wisconsin	2002 Wisconsin	2012 Washington	2022 Yale
1953 Washington	1963 Navy	1973 Wisconsin	1983 Navy	1993 Navy	2003 Harvard	2013 Washington	2023 California
1954 †	1964 Washington	1974 Wisconsin	1984 Navy	1994 Brown	2004 Harvard	2014 Washington	2024 Washington
1955 Cornell	1965 Navy	1975 Wisconsin	1985 Princeton	1995 Navy	2005 Harvard	2015 Washington	2025 Washington
1956 Cornell	1966 Pennsylvania	1976 Pennsylvania	1986 Wisconsin	1996 Wisconsin	2006 California	2016 California	2026 Washington
1957 Cornell	1967 Pennsylvania	1977 Pennsylvania	1987 Wisconsin	1997 Wisconsin	2007 Washington	2017 Washington	2027
1958 Cornell	1968 Pennsylvania	1978 Pennsylvania	1988 Wisconsin	1998 Princeton	2008 Washington	2018 Washington	2028
1959 Washington	1969 Pennsylvania	1979 Wisconsin	1989 Pennsylvania	1999 Wisconsin	2009 Washington	2019 Washington	2029
1960 Navy	1970 Washington	1980 Wisconsin	1990 Navy	2000 Wisconsin	2010 Washington	2020 cancelled (pandemic)	2030
1961 Cornell	1971 Cornell	1981 Cornell	1991 Pennsylvania	2001 Wisconsin	2011 Washington	2021 Washington	2031

† Navy was disqualified from the IRA Regatta for use of an ineligible coxswain. Trophies won by Navy were forfeited and not awarded.

Women and Combined

Year	Women; Camden County Freeholders Trophy	Combined Men & Women; Robert Mulcahy III Trophy
1997	Wisconsin	Wisconsin
1998	Wisconsin	Wisconsin
1999	University of Miami	Princeton
2000	Princeton	Wisconsin

=== Smaller Colleges ===
The Aberdeen Dad Vail Regatta, which is held in Philadelphia and is sponsored by the Dad Vail Rowing Association, is a national championship caliber regatta for lower level college teams. It is the largest collegiate regatta in the nation.

=== Men's Openweight Team (1982–96) ===
The now defunct National Collegiate Rowing Championship was a quasi-official national championship (as nothing until that time could be called "official" rather than de facto) for men's collegiate rowing held in Cincinnati, Ohio between 1982 and 1996. During these years Harvard, Yale and Washington, three of the sport's powers, did not participate in the IRAs. In 1982, a Harvard alumnus decided to remedy this perceived problem by establishing a heavyweight varsity National Collegiate Rowing Championship race in Cincinnati, Ohio. It paid for the winners of the Pac-10 Championship, the Eastern Sprints, the IRA and the Harvard-Yale race to attend. It was a finals-only event, and other crews could attend if they paid their own way and there was room in the field. After 1996 the race was discontinued.

Year	Champion	Year	Champion	Year	Champion
1982	Yale	1987	Harvard	1992	Harvard
1983	Harvard	1988	Harvard	1993	Brown
1984	Washington	1989	Harvard	1994	Brown
1985	Harvard	1990	Wisconsin	1995	Brown
1986	Wisconsin	1991	Pennsylvania	1996	Princeton

=== Women's Varsity Eights (1971–96) ===
The National Women's Rowing Association (NWRA) sponsored an annual open eights national championship from 1971 to 1979, among college and non-college teams. (There were no eights prior to 1971.) During this period, only in 1973 and 1975 did a college team win the national eights championship outright. According to US Rowing Association, contemporary news reports in 1976 and 1977 do not mention a national collegiate title. Beginning in 1980, the NWRA sponsored the Women's Collegiate National Championship, including varsity eights. In 1986 the NWRA dissolved after recognizing US Rowing's assuming of responsibility as the national governing body for women's rowing.

NWRA Open National Championship
Eights top college finishers, 1971–1979 (champion in parentheses) :

- 1971 Washington (first place - Vesper Boat Club)
- 1972 Washington (first place - College Boat Club)
- 1973 Radcliffe College (NWRA open champion)
- 1974 Radcliffe College (first place - Vesper Boat Club)
- 1975 Wisconsin (NWRA open champion)
- 1976 Wisconsin (first place - College Boat Club)
- 1977 Wisconsin (first place - Vesper Boat Club)
- 1978 Wisconsin (first place - Burnaby Boat Club)
- 1979 Yale (first place - Burnaby BC)

NWRA / US Rowing Women's Collegiate National Championship, Varsity eights :

Year and Champion	Year and Champion	Year and Champion	Year and Champion
1980 California	1985 Washington	1989 Cornell	1993 Princeton
1981 Washington	1986 Wisconsin	1990 Princeton	1994 Princeton
1982 Washington *	1987 Washington	1991 Boston University	1995 Princeton
1983 Washington	1988 Washington	1992 Boston University	1996 Brown
1984 Washington	1988 Washington	1992 Boston University	1996 Brown

* simultaneous AIAW championship, the only one conducted

The above Women's Varsity 8 results are included for completeness, even though women's rowing is now an NCAA sport and has had annual NCAA women's championships from 1997, in which women currently compete in a Varsity 8, a Second Varsity 8, and a Varsity Four.

=== Other ===
USRowing announced that an inaugural USRowing Collegiate National Championship regatta was to be held May 21–23, 2010, at Mercer Lake in West Windsor, N.J. The regatta was to be open to all athletes enrolled in a college or university. Events were to include both small and large boats, from single sculls to eights. The regatta was to be open to all collegiate programs, club or varsity, across all divisions and was to include both lightweight and open weight boat classes. USRowing stated that it hoped to provide a chance for varsity and club programs to compete head-to-head on a 2000-meter course and an opportunity for collegiate athletes to compete in small boats and sculling events.

== Rugby ==
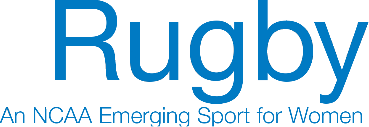
Logo of ESW Rugby

Rugby became an NCAA Emerging Sports for Women in 2003.

=== Rugby 7s ===
==== Collegiate Rugby Championship ====
Organized by National Collegiate Rugby from 2021 under license for name and logo.

Men

Year	Champion
2010	Utah
2011	Dartmouth
2012	Dartmouth
2013	California
2014	California
2015	California
2016	California
2017	California
2018	Lindenwood
2019	Lindenwood
2020	cancelled (pandemic)
2021	Lindenwood
2022	Kutztown (D1 Premier); Sam Houston State (D1 Club)
2023	Mount St. Mary's (D1 Premier); San Diego (D1 Club)
2024	Wheeling (D1 Premier); Louisville (D1 Club)
2025	Wheeling (D1 Premier); NC State (D1 Club)
2026	Wheeling (D1 Premier); Louisville (D1-AA)

Women

Year	Champion
2011	Army
2012	not held
2013	Penn State
2014	Penn State
2015	Penn State
2016	Life University
2017	Life University
2018	Lindenwood
2019	Lindenwood
2020	cancelled (pandemic)
2021	Lindenwood
2022	Lindenwood (D1 Premier); Roger Williams (D1 Club)
2023	Brown (D1 Premier); Clemson (D1 Club)
2024	Brown (D1 Premier); Claremont (D1 Club)
2025	Brown (D1 Premier); Northeastern (D1 Club)
2026	American International (D1 Premier); Northeastern (D1-AA)

==== USA Rugby Sevens Collegiate National Championships ====
In the first three years, strong teams that won bids declined to participate.

Men

Year	Div I Champion	Div II Champion
2011	Life University	not held
2012	Arkansas State	not held
2013	Arkansas State	Principia
2014	Annual schedule shifted from fall to spring	
2015	Lindenwood	James Madison
2016	Saint Mary's (CA)	Minnesota–Duluth
2017	Lindenwood	Wisconsin–Whitewater
2018	Lindenwood	UNC Charlotte
2019	Lindenwood (D1), Lindenwood-Belleville (D1AA)	North Carolina State
2020	canceled	(pandemic)
2021	canceled	(pandemic)
2022	Life University (D1), San Diego (D1 Club)	USC (D2/Open)

Women

Year	Champion	Div II Champion
2011	Norwich	not held
2012	Norwich	not held
2013	Norwich	not held
2014	shifted from fall to spring	not held
2015	Penn State	not held
2016	Life University	Davenport
2017	Lindenwood (Open)	eligible for open division
2018	Lindenwood (D1 Elite), Air Force (Open)	eligible for open division
2019	Lindenwood (D1 Elite), Air Force (D1)	Bryant
2020	canceled	(pandemic)
2021	canceled	(pandemic)
2022	Lindenwood (D1 Elite/NIRA), Davenport (D1 Club)	San Jose State

==== National Collegiate Rugby Organization ====
Division II
Men

Year	Champion
2022	Indiana University of Pennsylvania
2023	Indiana University of Pennsylvania
2024	Maine
2025	UNC Wilmington
2026	UNC Wilmington

Division II
Women

Year	Champion
2022	Chicago
2023	Roger Williams University
2024	Wisconsin-Eau Claire
2025	Coast Guard
2026	Colorado Mesa

Small College
Men

Year	Champion
2013	Occidental
2014	New England College
2015	New Mexico Highlands
2016	New Mexico Highlands
2017	Christendom College (Virginia)
2018	Claremont Colleges
2019	vacated, ineligible players (New Mexico Highlands)
2020	canceled (pandemic)
2021	canceled (pandemic)
2022	New Mexico Tech
2023	Babson College
2024	Slippery Rock
2025	Wisconsin-Eau Claire
2026	Slippery Rock

Small College
Women

Year	Champion
2014	Wayne State College (Nebraska)
2015	Wayne State College
2016	Wayne State College
2017	Colgate
2018	Wayne State College
2019	Wayne State College
2020	canceled (pandemic)
2021	canceled (pandemic)
2023	Endicott College
2024	Yale
2025	Endicott
2026	Colorado Mines

==== American Collegiate Rugby Association (Women) ====
Year	D1 Champion	D2 Champion
2014	Norwich	Notre Dame College (Ohio)
2015	Army	Davenport
2016	Davenport	Winona State
2017	Davenport (10-team invitational)	
2018–2021	no championship tournaments conducted	
2022	ACRA aligned as D2	Coast Guard

National Intercollegiate Rugby Association (Women)

Year	Champion
2016	Army
2017	Dartmouth
2018	Dartmouth
2019	not held
2020	cancelled (pandemic)
2021	cancelled (pandemic)
2022	Dartmouth

=== Rugby Union ===
The governance of collegiate rugby was split and diverged in 2021. The umbrella of the USA Rugby Collegiate Council includes College Rugby Association of America (CRAA), American Collegiate Rugby Association (ACRA), American College Rugby (ACR), and independent conferences. National Collegiate Rugby (NCR), formerly NSCRO, expanded beyond small colleges to include the higher divisions. Men's and women's conferences each chose as individual conferences (in some cases, schools within conferences also chose) to align with USA Rugby or NCR.

Women
Twelve women's conferences that played historically in DII left the oversight of USA Rugby to join NCR. Beginning in 2021, women's college rugby within NCR is split between Small College and an Open Division. The Open Division, which NCR now refers to as its DI, is made up of teams from these 12 conferences.

According to Goff Rugby Report, the DI Elite women's teams are part of College Rugby Association of America, and so are the vast majority of women's DI conferences (eight conferences) and the independents. There are also a couple of DII or hybrid conferences within CRAA.

The American Collegiate Rugby Association is a group of four DII-level women's conferences remaining under the aegis of USA Rugby, which included 62 teams as of June, 2020.

The NCAA women's varsity programs in the National Intercollegiate Rugby Association run their own competition and have a sanctioning agreement with USA Rugby.

Men
In 2021, most DII men's rugby conferences aligned with NCR.

Two men's conferences that played DIA in 2019 joined NCR in 2021, as have three DIAA conferences. Under NCR, they competed in fall 2021 as DI and DIAA, with separate postseasons.

Men's DIAA was dramatically split in 2021, with both NCR and CRAA-run postseasons in the fall. There will likely be a CRAA-run postseason in spring 2022. According to Goff Rugby Report, there is no way to have a men's DIAA national champion in 2021–2022.

In 2021, there are five men's DIA conferences plus independents under USA Rugby/CRAA.

==== Men, Division I ====
Prior to the full sanctioning of National Collegiate Rugby Championship by USA Rugby, it was not until the mid-1960s that rugby began to re-appear with regular fixtures and competitions. The earliest claims to a national title occurred when Sports Illustrated Magazine started demonstrating an interest in collegiate rugby. During the 1965-1966 season, the University of Notre Dame won several cups and tournaments and, in the absence of a bona fide national championship, Sports Illustrated named them unofficial collegiate rugby champions. The next year, under the authority of USARFU, Notre Dame played a match on April 8, 1967 against California at Memorial Stadium for the unofficial national championship, again as a result of both teams being highly rated by Sports Illustrated; Cal won 37-3.

In 1972, the first National Invitational Championship was introduced.

National Invitational Championship
Year	Champion	Score	Runner up	Match Report
1972	Palmer College of Chiropractic	28–17	Navy	
1973	Palmer College of Chiropractic	13–4	Illinois	
1974	Texas A&M	12–0	LSU	
1975	Not Held - reorganization of the USARFU			
1976 (fall)	LSU	21–3	Palmer College of Chiropractic	
1977	Moved from fall to following spring			
1978	Palmer College of Chiropractic	19–4	LSU	
1979	Palmer College of Chiropractic	24–6	Navy	

USA Rugby, Men, Division I-A
Year	Champion	Year	Champion	Year	Champion (Div IA)	Champion (Div IAA)
1980	California	1996	California	2011	California (Premier)	Davenport (Div I)
1981	California	1997	California	2012	BYU	Davenport
1982	California	1998	California	2013	Life	UCF
1983	California	1999	California	2014	Saint Mary's	UCF
1984	Harvard	2000	California	2015	Saint Mary's	UC Davis
1985	California	2001	California	2016	Life	UC Davis
1986	California	2002	California	2017	Saint Mary's	Notre Dame (OH)
1987	San Diego State	2003	Air Force	2018	Life	2017 (fall) Mary Washington 2018 (spring) Dartmouth; 2017–18 (overall) Mary Washington
1988	California	2004	California	2019	Life	2018 (fall) Bowling Green 2019 (spring) Dartmouth
1989	Air Force	2005	California	2020	canceled	2019 (fall) Iowa Central CC 2020 (spring) canceled
1990	Air Force	2006	California	2021	canceled	2020–21 canceled
1991	California	2007	California	2022	Army (CRAA)	2021 (fall) Tennessee (CRAA) 2022 (spring) Fresno State (ACR)
1992	California	2008	California	2023	Navy (CRAA)	San Diego (ACR)
1993	California	2009	BYU	2024	Saint Mary's (CRAA)	San Diego (ACR/CRAA)
1994	California	2010	California	2025	California (CRAA)	St. Thomas (FL)
1995	California	2010	California	2026	California (CRAA)	Western Washington

Year	Varsity Cup Championship Result
2013	BYU 27, California 24
2014	BYU 43, California 33
2015	BYU 30, (Note: In 2016, BYU was stripped of the 2015 title for using an ineligible player.) California 27
2016	California 40, BYU 29
2017	California 43, Arkansas State 13

National Collegiate Rugby

NCR Men XV Division I
Year	Champion	Score	Runner-up	Location	Date
2021	St. Bonaventure	19 - 18	Penn State	Houston TX	12 Dec 2021
2022	Brown	21 - 5	Queens	Houston TX	10 Dec 2022
2023	Notre Dame College	33 - 10	St. Bonaventure	Houston TX	9 Dec 2023
2024	Brown	23 - 20	Queens	Houston, TX	14 Dec 2024
2025	St. Bonaventure	55 - 19	Queens	Houston, TX	13 Dec 2025

NCR Men XV Division I-AA
Year	Champion	Score	Runner-up	Location	Date
2021	Virginia Tech	34 - 22	West Chester	Houston TX	12 Dec 2021
2022	Virginia Tech	24 - 22	Louisville	Houston TX	10 Dec 2022
2023	Kentucky	43 - 28	Louisville	Houston TX	9 Dec 2023
2024	Kentucky	57 - 14	Bowling Green	Houston TX	14 Dec 2024
2025	Tennessee	21 - 15	Bowling Green	Houston TX	13 Dec 2025

==== Women, Division I ====
USA Rugby

Year	Women, Division I Elite Result
2016	Penn State 15, BYU 5
2017	Penn State 28, Lindenwood 25
2018	Lindenwood 36, Life 9
2019	Lindenwood 36, Life 19
2020	cancelled (pandemic)
2021	Lindenwood 54, Life 12
2022	Lindenwood 21, Life 0
2023	Lindenwood 17, Life 15
2024	Life 44, Lindenwood 41
2025	Lindenwood 19, Life 15

As of fall 2021, according to Goff Rugby Report, "The vast majority of women's DI conferences are playing as part of College Rugby Association of America" (USA Rugby).

Women, Division I
Year and Champion	Year and Champion	Year and Champion	Year and Champion	Year and Champion
1991 Air Force	1998 Harvard-Radcliffe	2005 Stanford	2012 Penn State	2018-19 fall – Air Force spring – BYU
1992 Boston College	1999 Stanford	2006 Stanford	2013 Penn State	2019-20 fall – Air Force spring – canceled
1993 Connecticut	2000 Penn State	2007 Penn State	2014 Penn State	2020-21 fall – canceled spring – canceled
1994 Air Force	2001 Chico State	2008 Stanford	2015 Penn State	2021-22 fall – Navy (CRAA) spring – BYU (CRAA)
1995 Princeton	2002 Air Force	2009 Penn State	2015-16 fall – Connecticut spring – UC Davis	2022-23 fall – Navy (CRAA) spring – BYU (CRAA)
1996 Princeton	2003 Air Force	2010 Penn State	2016-17 fall – Air Force spring – UC Davis	2023-24 fall – Northeastern (CRAA) spring – Stanford (CRAA)
1997 Penn State	2004 Penn State	2011 Army	2017-18 fall – Davenport spring – Chico State	2024-25 Stanford

National Collegiate Rugby

Women, Division I

According to Goff Rugby Report, the vast majority of women's teams and conferences that switched to working with NCR for fall 2021 previously competed in USA Rugby's DII women's competition. NCR refers to this division as its DI. In 2021, Life University fielded a largely freshman and sophomore team.

- 2021 (fall) – Life University 87, Northern Iowa 3
- 2022 – Michigan 41, Notre Dame College 14
- 2023 – Michigan 33, Notre Dame College 17
- 2024 – Wheeling 58, Southern Nazarene 17
- 2025 – Southern Nazerene 82, Northern Iowa 21

==== Division II ====
USA Rugby

Men, Division II	Women, Division II
1994 Lock Haven	
1995 Lock Haven
1996 Salisbury
1997 Salisbury
1998 UC San Diego
1999 UC San Diego
2000 Sacramento State	2000 Plymouth State (NH)
2001 Baylor	2001 Northern Iowa
2002 Stanford	2002 Northern Iowa
2003 Radford	2003 Dayton
2004 Salisbury	2004 Temple
2005 Northern Colorado	2005 Providence
2006 Coast Guard	2006 UC Santa Cruz
2007 Middlebury	2007 Iowa State
2008 Radford	2008 Shippensburg
2009 Middlebury	2009 Shippensburg
2010 Claremont	2010 Washington State
2011 Wisconsin–Whitewater	2011 Harvard-Radcliffe
2012 Lindenwood	2012 Norwich
2013 (spring) Salisbury	2013 Washington State
2013 (moved to fall) Minnesota–Duluth	2014 Mary Washington
2014 (fall) Minnesota–Duluth	2015 Notre Dame (OH)
2015 (fall) Minnesota–Duluth	2016 Davenport
2016 (fall) Wisconsin–Whitewater	2017 Davenport
2017 Wisconsin–Whitewater	2017-18 fall – Winona State spring – Tulane
2018 North Carolina State	2018-19 fall – Vassar spring – Fresno State
2019 Queens University (NC)	2019-20 fall – Winona State spring – canceled
2020 canceled (pandemic)	2020-21 canceled
2021 Auburn (CRAA)	2021-22 fall – Vassar (ACRA) spring – Claremont (CRAA)

National Collegiate Rugby

Men, Division II

- 2021 (fall) – Thomas More
- 2022 – Principia
- 2023 – IUP
- 2024 – IUP
- 2025 – Vermont

==== Other D1/D2 ====
American Collegiate Rugby Association (Women)
ACRA formed in 2013 as a group committed to fall 15s and spring 7s. As of 2021, the American Collegiate Rugby Association is a group of DII-level women's conferences — Tri-State, MARC, Rugby Northeast, NEWCRC. In 2021, they invited the Rocky Mountain Conference to send teams to the ACRA playoffs, which are held in the fall; five conferences sent eight teams. According to Goff Rugby Report, "ACRA's championship isn't technically a [national] women's DII championship, but it's pretty close, [as] there are teams that play DII-level rugby and will play in the spring [2022]. They won't be ACRA."

Year	DII Champion
2013	Winona (ACRA also held a DI tournament, winner: Norwich)
2014	ACRA organized the USA Rugby DI and DII fall championships.
2015	Davenport (qualified for USA Rugby D2 championship final in May, 2016) (Note: ACRA permanently withdrew as DI tournament organizer for USA Rugby.)
2016–2019	No tournaments conducted
2020	Association re-formed and planned a fall season, later canceled (pandemic).
2021	Vassar

National Intercollegiate Rugby Association (Women)
The NCAA women's varsity programs in the National Intercollegiate Rugby Association run their own competition and have a sanctioning agreement with USA Rugby. It began play in 2015.

Year	D1 Champion	D2 Champion	D3 Champion
2015	Quinnipiac		
2016	Quinnipiac	Bowdoin	
2017	Quinnipiac	New England	
2018	Dartmouth	Mount St. Mary's	
2019	Harvard	West Chester	Bowdoin
2020	canceled (pandemic)		
2021	Dartmouth	American International	Bowdoin
2022	Dartmouth	Queens	Bowdoin
2023	Harvard	Davenport	Bowdoin
2024	Harvard	American International	
2025	Harvard	American International	

==== Small College Championship ====
National Collegiate Rugby Organization

From 2002 to 2006 for Men's Division III and from 2003 to 2006 for Women's Division III, event name was "East Coast Division III Collegiate Championship." In 2007, events were renamed to "National Men's Collegiate Division III Championship", "National Women's Collegiate Division III Championship" and "National Women's Collegiate Division IV Championship". Effective August 2012, Small College Championship nomenclature replaced Division III.

Men; Division III / Small College	Women; Division III / Small College	Women; Division IV
2002 Western Carolina		
2003 Furman	2003 College of New Jersey	
2004 Furman	2004 Fordham	
2005 Furman	2005 Castleton State	
2006 Bentley	2006 Babson	
2007 Bentley	2007 (spring) Stonehill (fall) Stonehill	2007 (spring) Rhode Island (fall) Roger Williams
2008 Plymouth State	2008 Bryant	2008 Holy Cross
2009 Coastal Carolina	2009 MIT	2009 Drexel
2010 Penn State Berks	2010 Bentley	2010 Lock Haven
2011 Longwood	2011 Carleton	2011 Johnson State
2012 Salve Regina	2012 Wayne State (NE)	
2013 Saint John's (MN)	2013 Wayne State (NE)	
2014 Saint John's (MN)	2014 Roger Williams	
2015 New England College	2015 Minn. State–Moorhead	
2016 Mount St. Mary's	2016 Wayne State (NE)	
2017 Claremont Colleges	2017 Wayne State (NE)	
2018 Iowa Central Community College	2018 Wayne State (NE)	
2019 Claremont Colleges	2019 Wayne State (NE)	
2020 canceled	2020 canceled	
2021 (moved to fall) Christendom College	2021 Wayne State (NE)	
2022 Humboldt	2022 Endicott	
2023 Babson	2023 St. Bonaventure	
2024 Wayne State	2024 Endicott	
2025 Franciscan	2025 Colorado School of Mines	

== Sailing ==
=== Inter-Collegiate Sailing Association Championship ===
The Inter-Collegiate Sailing Association (ICSA; Inter-Collegiate Yacht Racing Association prior to 2001) holds National Championships in six different events. Since intercollegiate sailing is a fall and spring sport, three of these championships are held in the fall and three are held in the spring.

The Fall Championships are for single-handed men and women and sloops. The Sloop Championships take place in mid-November using small keelboats supplied by the venue. Each sloop team sails with a crew of three. In the fall of 2010, the sloop championship was converted to a match racing format.

The ICSA National Championship Regatta is held once each year in May and is actually composed of three different regattas: a Team Racing Championship, a Women's Championship and a Coed Dinghy Championship. The most prestigious of these events is the Coed Dinghy Championship.

The title for best overall performance (Leonard M. Fowle Trophy winner) includes the six National Championships: Men's Singlehanded, Women's Singlehanded, Match Racing Championship (previously Sloop), Women's Dinghy, Team Race, and Coed Dinghy.

Dinghy (1937–1966)
Year and Champion	Year and Champion	Year and Champion	Year and Champion	Year and Champion
1937 MIT	1943 MIT	1949 Yale	1955 MIT	1961 MIT
1938 MIT	1944 Coast Guard	1950 Yale	1956 Navy	1962 Coast Guard
1939 MIT	1945 MIT	1951 MIT	1957 Navy	1963 Princeton
1940 Princeton	1946 MIT	1952 Harvard	1958 MIT	1964 British Columbia
1941 Princeton	1947 Yale	1953 Harvard	1959 Harvard	1965 Rhode Island
1942 Brown	1948 Brown	1954 MIT	1960 Coast Guard	1966 Coast Guard

Year	Coed Dinghy	Women's Dinghy	Sloops(Match racing from 2010)	Team Race	Overall Performance
1967	USC	Wilson (PA)			
1968	San Diego State	Radcliffe			
1969	San Diego State	Radcliffe			
1970	USC	Radcliffe			
1971	USC	MIT			
1971-72	UC Irvine	Radcliffe	Michigan		SUNY Maritime
1972-73	Tulane	MIT	SUNY Maritime		SUNY Maritime
1973-74	Harvard	Princeton	Tulane		Tulane
1974-75	Yale	Princeton	USC		Tufts
1975-76	Tufts	Princeton	UC Santa Cruz		Tufts
1976-77	Rhode Island	Princeton	Navy	Rhode Island	Navy
1977-78	UCLA	California	Navy	Navy	Navy
1978-79	Merchant Marine	Navy	Texas	Navy	Navy
1979-80	Tufts	Navy	UC Irvine	Boston University	Navy
1980-81	Tufts	Navy	Texas	Long Beach State	Navy
1981-82	Boston University	Old Dominion	Boston University	Boston University	Navy
1982-83	Merchant Marine	Navy	Navy	Merchant Marine	Navy
1983-84	Merchant Marine	Tufts	UC Santa Barbara	Tufts	Tufts
1984-85	Boston University	Brown	Washington	USC	Boston University
1985-86	College of Charleston	Tufts	Spring Hill	Tulane	College of Charleston
1986-87	Merchant Marine	Old Dominion	Navy	Navy	Navy
1987-88	UC Irvine	Brown	Connecticut College	UC Irvine	College of Charleston
1988-89	Old Dominion	Tufts	Old Dominion	Navy	Old Dominion
1989-90	UC Irvine	Tufts	Old Dominion	Old Dominion	Old Dominion
1990-91	Navy	Navy	College of Charleston	Navy	Brown
1991-92	Dartmouth	Dartmouth	College of Charleston	Navy	Navy
1992-93	Navy	Tufts	Old Dominion	Tufts	Tufts
1993-94	Navy	Tufts	St. Mary's (MD)	Tufts	Tufts
1994-95	Navy	St. Mary's (MD)	Navy	Tufts	Tufts
1995-96	Merchant Marine	Tufts	Navy	Tufts	Tufts
1996-97	Tufts	Navy	Boston University	Stanford	Navy
1997-98	Old Dominion	Brown	Merchant Marine	Old Dominion	College of Charleston
1998-99	Boston University	Tufts	College of Charleston	St. Mary's (MD)	Tufts
1999–2000	St. Mary's (MD)	Dartmouth	Merchant Marine	St. Mary's (MD)	St. Mary's (MD)
2000-01	Tufts	Hawaii	Harvard	Georgetown	Harvard
2001-02	St. Mary's (MD)	Old Dominion	Harvard	Harvard	Harvard
2002-03	Harvard	Tufts	College of Charleston	Harvard	Harvard
2003-04	Hawaii	Yale	Merchant Marine	St. Mary's (MD)	Harvard
2004-05	Hobart and William Smith	Harvard	Texas A&M Galveston	Hobart and William Smith	Harvard
2005-06	College of Charleston	College of Charleston	UC Irvine	Georgetown	Georgetown
2006-07	College of Charleston	St. Mary's (MD)	College of Charleston	St. Mary's (MD)	College of Charleston
2007-08	Georgetown	Boston College	St. Mary's (MD)	Boston College	Boston College
2008-09	St. Mary's (MD)	Yale	South Florida	Boston College	Yale
2009-10	Boston College	College of Charleston	Boston College	St. Mary's (MD)	Boston College
2010-11	Boston College	Rhode Island	Boston College	Roger Williams	Boston College
2011-12	Georgetown	Boston College	Navy	College of Charleston	College of Charleston
2012-13	College of Charleston	Dartmouth	Tufts	Yale	Yale
2013-14	Yale	Dartmouth	Georgetown	Yale	Yale
2014-15	Yale	Yale	Georgetown	Yale	Charleston
2015-16	Georgetown	Coast Guard	Charleston	Yale	Yale
2016-17	Charleston	Yale	Georgetown	Charleston	Charleston
2017-18	MIT	Boston College	Boston College	Charleston	Charleston
2018-19	Charleston	Brown	Boston College	Yale	Yale
2019-20	Canceled due to COVID-19 pandemic	Canceled due to COVID-19 pandemic	Stanford	Canceled due to COVID-19 pandemic	Canceled due to COVID-19 pandemic
2020-21	Navy	Charleston	Canceled due to COVID-19 pandemic	Navy	Charleston
2021-22	Tulane	Boston College	Yale	Yale	Yale
2022-23	Stanford	Stanford	Yale	Harvard	Stanford
2023-24	Harvard	Stanford	Brown	Roger Williams	Brown
2024-25	Stanford	Stanford	Boston College	Harvard	Stanford
2025-26	Brown	Stanford	Harvard	Harvard	Harvard

=== Collegiate Offshore Large Boats Championship ===
Kennedy Cup, boat class: Navy 44

Year	Champion	Year	Champion	Year	Champion	Year	Champion	Year	Champion	Year	Champion
1965	Harvard	1977	Navy	1989	Navy	2001	Massachusetts Maritime	2012-13	Navy	2024-25	Charleston
1966	Navy	1978	Tennessee	1990	Navy	2002	College of Charleston	2013-14	California Maritime	2025-26	Charleston
1967	Stanford	1979	Tufts	1991	Rhode Island	2003	College of Charleston	2014-15	Charleston		
1968	Stanford	1980	Navy	1992	Rhode Island	2004	Rhode Island	2015-16	California Maritime		
1969	Cornell	1981	Navy	1993	Navy	2005	Merchant Marine	2016-17	South Florida		
1970	Tulane	1982	Navy	1994	USC	2006	Navy	2017-18	South Florida		
1971	Tulane	1983	SUNY Maritime	1995	Navy	2006-07	Rhode Island	2018-19	New York Maritime		
1972	Merchant Marine	1984	UC-Santa Barbara	1996	Rhode Island	2007-08	Navy	2019-20	Charleston		
1973	Michigan	1985	Texas A&M Galveston	1997	Navy	2008-09	Rhode Island	2020-21	Canceled due to COVID-19 pandemic		
1974	Dartmouth	1986	Rhode Island	1998	Rhode Island	2009-10	California Maritime	2021-22	California Maritime		
1975	Texas	1987	Rhode Island	1999	College of Charleston	2010-11	Maine Maritime	2022-23	California Maritime		
1976	Yale	1988	Navy	2000	College of Charleston	2011-12	Navy	2023-24	Merchant Marine		

=== Collegiate Match Racing Championship ===
Douglas Cup

Year	Champion	Year	Champion	Year	Champion	Year	Champion
1966	Long Beach State	1973	Hawaii	1980	?	1987	College of Charleston
1967	British Columbia	1974	USC	1981	?	1988	?
1968	USC	1975	California	1982	Long Beach State	1989	Tulane
1969	Tulane	1976	Navy	1983	?	1990	SUNY Maritime
1970	Tulane	1977	Washington	1984	Texas	1991	?
1971	USC	1978	?	1985	Texas	199?	(Note: The last Douglas Cup competition was in the 1990s.)
1972	Washington	1979	UC Irvine	1986	College of Charleston (?)		

== Ski and Snowboard ==
United States Collegiate Ski and Snowboard Association

In 2009, events included Giant Slalom, Slalom, Cross-Country Sprints, Cross-Country Relays, Cross-Country Distance, Halfpipe, Slopestyle, SkierCross, and Snowboard Cross. NCAA championship alpine events likewise include slalom and GS. However, the NCAA Nordic program is limited to 2 events. Because the USCSA Nordic competition occurs in 4 or more events each for men and women, the Nordic winners are included here.

Year	Nordic (M)	Nordic (W)	Snowboard (M)	Snowboard (W)	Freestyle (M)	Freestyle (W)	Overall (M)†	Overall (W)†
1979	?	?						
...	?	?						
1994	?	College of Idaho						
1995	?	College of Idaho						
1996	Cornell University	?						
1997	Whitman College (WA)	?						
1998	?	?						
1999	?	?	Simon Fraser University (B.C.)	Simon Fraser University (B.C.)				
2000	?	?	Simon Fraser University (B.C.)	Simon Fraser University (B.C.)				
2001	?	?	Whitman College	?				
2002	?	?	Whitman College	?				
2003	?	Wyoming	Whitman College	?				
2004	?	Wyoming	?	?				
2005	St. Olaf (MN)	St. Olaf (MN)	Western Michigan	Western Michigan				
2006	Wyoming	St. Olaf (MN)	Sierra Nevada College	Weber State (UT)				
2007	Cornell	Wyoming	Sierra Nevada College	U of Idaho				
2008	St. Olaf (MN)	St. Olaf (MN)	Sierra Nevada College	U of Idaho	Colorado (invitational)	Colorado (invitational)		
2009	Wyoming	Wyoming	Sierra Nevada College	Westminster College (UT)	Southern California	Colorado		
2010	Wyoming	Wyoming	Sierra Nevada College	Westminster College	Southern California	"under review"		
2011	Western State College	St. Olaf	Sierra Nevada College	Westminster College	College of Idaho	College of Idaho		
2012	Clarkson	Clarkson	Sierra Nevada College	Westminster College	Colorado	Sierra Nevada College		
2013	Wyoming	St. Olaf	Sierra Nevada College	Westminster College	Colorado	Colorado		
2014	St. Olaf	Wyoming	Sierra Nevada College	Sierra Nevada College	Sierra Nevada College	Sierra Nevada College	St. Olaf	St. Olaf
2015	Wyoming	St. Olaf	Westminster College	Westminster College	Sierra Nevada College	Sierra Nevada College	St. Olaf	St. Olaf
2016	Wyoming	Clarkson	Sierra Nevada College	Westminster College	Colorado	Sierra Nevada College	Clarkson	St. Olaf
2017	Wyoming	Clarkson	Westminster College	Westminster College	Sierra Nevada	Sierra Nevada	Clarkson	St. Olaf
2018	Western State Colorado	St. Olaf	Westminster College	Westminster College	Sierra Nevada	Sierra Nevada	St. Olaf	St. Olaf
2019	Castleton	Clarkson	Westminster College	Westminster College	Sierra Nevada	Sierra Nevada	Clarkson	Castleton
2020	Castleton	Castleton	Westminster College	Westminster College	Colorado	Vermont	Castleton	Castleton
2021	Cancelled due to COVID-19 pandemic							
2022	Paul Smith's College	St. Olaf	Sierra Nevada	Sierra Nevada	Colorado	Rocky Mountain College	Clarkson	St. Olaf
2023	Western Colorado	St. Olaf	Nevada	Lees-McRae	Colorado	Rocky Mountain College	Clarkson	St. Olaf
2024	Clarkson	St. Olaf	Lees-McCrae	The Claremont Colleges	Liberty	The Claremont Colleges	Clarkson	St. Olaf
2025	Wyoming	St. Olaf	Westminster University	Westminster University	Westminster University	Rocky Mountain College	Clarkson	St. Olaf
2026	Paul Smith's College	St. Olaf	Westminster University	Westminster University	Westminster University	Westminster University	Clarkson	St. Olaf

† includes additional scoring for alpine events

== Softball (Slow-pitch), Women ==
After the last AIAW competition in 1982, college championships were conducted by the Amateur Softball Association in 1983 and 1984. It appears that most of the college women's slow-pitch teams at that time were from Florida and North Carolina. After 1984, the highest level of collegiate national championship was conducted by the National Junior College Athletic Association, whose slow-pitch tournament was held from 1983 through 2000.

Year and Champion
1983 University of South Florida
1984 University of South Florida
1985 Palm Beach Community College (Note: also won NJCAA title in 1984)
1986 Lake City Community College (now Florida Gateway College) (Note: also won NJCAA title in 1983)
1987 Lake City Community College
1988 Pensacola Junior College
1989 Lake City Community College
1990 Lake City Community College
1991 Abraham Baldwin Agricultural College (Georgia)
1992 Lake City Community College
1993 Lake City Community College
1994 Tallahassee Community College
1995 Abraham Baldwin Agricultural College
1996 Abraham Baldwin Agricultural College
1997 Meridian Community College (Mississippi)
1998 Calhoun Community College (Alabama)
1999 Calhoun Community College
2000 Calhoun Community College

== Squash ==
College Squash Association

National nine-player team champions: From 1942 to 1988, the title was based on dual-match records, with the team with the best record becoming the national champion. Since 1989, the title has been based on performance in the National Team Championships, with the team winning the “A” division becoming the national champion.

Men, 9-player team
Year and Champion	Year and Champion	Year and Champion	Year and Champion
1942: Princeton	1967: US Naval Academy	1989: Yale	2011: Trinity College
1943: Yale	1968: Harvard	1990: Yale	2012: Princeton
1947: Yale	1969: Harvard	1991: Harvard	2013: Trinity College
1948: Yale	1970: Harvard	1992: Harvard	2014: Harvard
1949: Yale	1971: Harvard	1993: Harvard	2015: Trinity College
1950: Yale	1972: Harvard	1994: Harvard	2016: Yale
1951: Harvard	1973: Harvard	1995: Harvard	2017: Trinity College
1952: Yale	1974: Princeton	1996: Harvard	2018: Trinity College
1953: Harvard and Yale	1975: Princeton	1997: Harvard	2019: Harvard
1954: Harvard	1976: Harvard	1998: Harvard	2020: Harvard
1955: Princeton	1977: Princeton	1999: Trinity College (CT)	2021: Cancelled due to COVID-19 pandemic
1956: Harvard	1978: Princeton	2000: Trinity College	2022: Harvard
1957: US Naval Academy	1979: Princeton	2001: Trinity College	2023: Harvard
1958: Yale	1980: Harvard	2002: Trinity College	2024: Penn
1959: US Naval Academy	1981: Princeton	2003: Trinity College	2025: Penn
1960: Harvard	1982: Princeton	2004: Trinity College	2026: Trinity College
1961: Yale	1983: Harvard	2005: Trinity College	2027:
1962: Yale	1984: Harvard	2006: Trinity College	2028:
1963: Harvard	1985: Harvard	2007: Trinity College	2029:
1964: Harvard	1986: Harvard	2008: Trinity College	2030:
1965: Harvard	1987: Harvard	2009: Trinity College	2031:
1966: Harvard	1988: Harvard	2010: Trinity College	2032:

Between 1956 and 1988, the National Intercollegiate Squash Racquets Association awarded an additional team trophy based on players’ performances in the national individual tournament. From 1956 to 1968, teams competed with four players, and from 1969 to 1988, they competed with six players.

Year	Men; 4-player team champion	Year	Men; 6-player team champion	Year	Men; 6-player team champion
1956	Harvard	1969	Harvard	1982	Harvard
1957	Harvard	1970	Harvard	1983	Harvard
1958	Williams College (MA)	1971	Pennsylvania	1984	Harvard
1959	Princeton	1972	Harvard	1985	Harvard
1960	Princeton	1973	Pennsylvania	1986	Harvard
1961	Yale	1974	Pennsylvania	1987	Harvard
1962	Yale	1975	Harvard	1988	Princeton
1963	Yale	1976	Princeton		
1964	Harvard	1977	Western Ontario		
1965	Princeton	1978	Princeton		
1966	Harvard	1979	Princeton		
1967	Harvard	1980	Western Ontario		
1968	Harvard	1981	Harvard		

Women
Year and Champion	Year and Champion	Year and Champion	Year and Champion	Year and Champion
1973: Princeton	1986: Yale	1999: Princeton	2012: Harvard	2025: Trinity
1974: Princeton	1987: Harvard	2000: Pennsylvania	2013: Harvard	2026: Pennsylvania
1975: Princeton	1988: Harvard	2001: Harvard	2014: Trinity College	2027:
1976: Princeton	1989: Princeton	2002: Trinity College	2015: Harvard	2028:
1977: Yale	1990: Harvard	2003: Trinity College	2016: Harvard	2029:
1978: Princeton	1991: Princeton	2004: Yale	2017: Harvard	2030:
1979: Princeton	1992: Yale	2005: Yale	2018: Harvard	2031:
1980: Princeton	1993: Harvard	2006: Yale	2019: Harvard	2032:
1981: Princeton	1994: Harvard	2007: Princeton	2020: Harvard	2033:
1982: Harvard	1995: Harvard	2008: Princeton	2021: Cancelled due to COVID-19 pandemic	2034:
1983: Princeton	1996: Harvard	2009: Princeton	2022: Harvard	2035:
1984: Princeton	1997: Harvard	2010: Harvard	2023: Harvard	2036:
1985: Harvard	1998: Princeton	2011: Yale	2024: Trinity	2037:

== Surfing ==
National Scholastic Surfing Association (1978 - )

Year and Champion	Year and Champion	Year and Champion	Year and Champion
1970 UC San Diego	1989 Point Loma Nazarene College	2002 UC Santa Barbara	2015 Point Loma Nazarene University
1976 & 1977 Orange Coast College	1990 UC San Diego	2003 UC San Diego	2016 Point Loma Nazarene University
1978 Orange Coast College	1991 UC Santa Barbara	2004 MiraCosta College	2017 Point Loma Nazarene University
1979 No team award	1992 UC Santa Barbara	2005 UC Santa Barbara	2018 Point Loma Nazarene University
1980 Orange Coast College	1993 UC San Diego	2006 Saddleback College	2019 California State, San Marcos
1981 Orange Coast College	1994 UC Santa Barbara	2007 San Diego State	2020 cancelled
1982 Orange Coast College	1995 UC San Diego	2008 UC Santa Barbara	2021
1983 UC San Diego	1996 UC Santa Barbara	2009 California State, San Marcos	2022 Saddleback College
1984 UC Santa Barbara	1997 UC San Diego	2010 UC Santa Barbara	2023 Point Loma Nazarene University
1985 UC Santa Barbara	1998 UC Santa Barbara	2011 MiraCosta College	2024 Point Loma Nazarene University
1986 UC Santa Barbara	1999 Point Loma Nazarene University	2012 MiraCosta College	2025 Point Loma Nazarene University
1987 San Diego State	2000 MiraCosta College	2013 San Diego State	2026 Westcliff University
1988 UC Santa Barbara	2001 California State, Long Beach	2014 Saddleback College	2027

== Synchronized Skating ==
US Figure Skating

Year and Champion	Year and Champion	Year and Champion	Year and Champion	Year and Champion	Year and Champion
1997 Miami (OH)	2002 Miami (OH)	2007 Miami (OH)	2012 Miami (OH)	2017 Michigan	2022 Miami (OH)
1998 Miami (OH)	2003 Miami (OH)	2008 Miami (OH)	2013 Miami (OH)	2018 Michigan	2023 Miami (OH)
1999 Michigan	2004 Western Michigan	2009 Miami (OH)	2014 Miami (OH)	2019 Miami (OH)	2024 Miami (OH)
2000 Miami (OH)	2005 Miami (OH)	2010 Miami (OH)	2015 Miami (OH)	2020 Michigan	2025 Miami (OH)
2001 Miami (OH)	2006 Miami (OH)	2011 Miami (OH)	2016 Miami (OH)	2021 Cancelled	2026 Miami (OH)

== Synchronized Swimming ==
USA Artistic Swimming

Preceded by AIAW tournament 1977-82

Year	Champion	Year	Champion	Year	Champion	Year	Champion	Year	Champion	Year	Champion	Year	Champion
1983	Ohio State	1990	Ohio State	1997	Ohio State	2004	Ohio State	2011	Ohio State	2018	Ohio State	2025	Stanford
1984	Arizona	1991	Ohio State	1998	Stanford	2005	Stanford	2012	Ohio State	2019	Ohio State	2026	Stanford
1985	Ohio State	1992	Ohio State	1999	Stanford	2006	Stanford	2013	Stanford	2020	cancelled (pandemic)	2027	
1986	Ohio State	1993	Ohio State	2000	Ohio State	2007	Stanford	2014	Lindenwood	2021	Stanford	2028	
1987	Ohio State	1994	Ohio State	2001	Ohio State	2008	Stanford	2015	Ohio State	2022	Ohio State	2029	
1988	Ohio State	1995	Ohio State	2002	Ohio State	2009	Ohio State	2016	Stanford	2023	Ohio State	2030	
1989	Ohio State	1996	Ohio State	2003	Ohio State	2010	Ohio State	2017	Ohio State	2024	Incarnate Word	2031	

== Table Tennis ==
National Collegiate Table Tennis Association

Year	Men	Year	Men	Year	Coed	Women	Year	Coed	Women	Year	Coed	Women	Year	Coed	Women
1993	Stony Brook	2000	Johns Hopkins	2005	Texas Wesleyan	Virginia Tech	2012	Texas Wesleyan	Lindenwood	2019	Texas Wesleyan	Texas Wesleyan	2026	Texas Wesleyan	UCLA
1994	Brown	2001	Bradley	2006	Texas Wesleyan	Stanford	2013	Texas Wesleyan	Texas Wesleyan	2020	Canceled due to COVID-19 pandemic	Canceled due to COVID-19 pandemic			
1995	Penn	2002	Illinois	2007	Texas Wesleyan	Texas Wesleyan	2014	Texas Wesleyan	Princeton	2021	Canceled due to COVID-19 pandemic	Canceled due to COVID-19 pandemic			
1996	not held	2003	Illinois	2008	Texas Wesleyan	Texas Wesleyan	2015	Mississippi College	Princeton	2022	New York University	Texas Wesleyan			
1997	RPI	2004	Texas Wesleyan	2009	Texas Wesleyan	Texas Wesleyan	2016	Texas Wesleyan	Texas Wesleyan	2023	New York University	UCLA			
1998	Johns Hopkins	2005	n/a	2010	Texas Wesleyan	Lindenwood	2017	Texas Wesleyan	Texas Wesleyan	2024	Texas Wesleyan	Texas Wesleyan			
1999	not held	2006	n/a	2011	Texas Wesleyan	Texas Wesleyan	2018	New York University	Texas Wesleyan	2025	California	UCLA			

== Taekwondo ==
National Collegiate Taekwondo Association

Year	Men	Women	Year	Overall	Year	Overall	Year	"Championship Div."	Year	"Championship Div."	Year	"Championship Div."
1976	California	California	1985	Iowa State	1994	California	2003	Iowa State	2012	California	2021	cancelled
1977	California	Howard	1986	California	1995	California	2004	California	2013	Stanford	2022	MIT
1978	Howard	Howard	1987	Iowa State	1996	California	2005	California	2014	California	2023	California
1979	Howard	Howard	1988	Iowa State	1997^{‡}	California	2006	California	2015	California	2024	
1980	Howard	Howard	1989	Iowa State	1998	California	2007	California	2016	California	2025	Brown & Texas (tie)
1981	Howard	Howard	1990	California	1999	California	2008	California	2017	California	2026	Texas
1982	California	Howard	1991	California	2000	California	2009	California	2018	California & Stanford (tie)	2027	
1983	Howard	Howard	1992	California	2001	California	2010	California	2019	MIT	2028	
1984^{†}	Howard	Howard	1993	California	2002	California	2011	California	2020	cancelled	2029	

^{†} 1984 was the final year of separate men's and women's team competitions.

^{‡} Beginning in 1997, the black belt competition has been conducted in a "championship division." Separate team awards were added for other belt colors and novices.

== Team Handball ==
USA Team Handball

Year	Men	Women	Year	Men	Women	Year	Men	Women	Year	Men	Women	Year	Men	Women	Year	Men	Women	Year	Men	Women
1965	First champ. around 1968	No champ.	1975	Willamette	Kansas State	1985	West Point	Fullerton	1995	West Point		2005	North Carolina	West Point	2015	West Point	West Point	2025	West Point	North Carolina
1966	First champ. around 1968	No champ.	1976	West Point	Kansas State	1986	West Point		1996	West Point	West Point	2006	North Carolina	West Point	2016	West Point	West Point	2026	West Point	West Point
1967	First champ. around 1968	No champ.	1977	Air Force		1987	West Point	Minnesota	1997	West Point	Slippery Rock	2007	West Point	West Point	2017	West Point	West Point			
1968	First champ. around 1968	No champ.	1978	Air Force	Ohio State	1988	West Point	Air Force	1998	West Point		2008	West Point	Cortland State (NY)	2018	West Point	Penn State			
1969	First champ. around 1968	No champ.	1979	West Point		1989	West Point	West Point	1999	West Point	West Point	2009	West Point	North Carolina	2019	West Point	West Point			
1970	First champ. around 1968	No champ.	1980	West Point	West Point	1990	West Point	West Point	2000	West Point	West Point	2010	West Point	North Carolina	2020	Cancelled due to COVID-19				
1971	First champ. around 1968	No champ.	1981	West Point		1991	West Point	West Point	2001	West Point	West Point	2011	West Point	North Carolina	2021	Cancelled due to COVID-19				
1972	Adelphi	No champ.	1982	West Point	West Point	1992	West Point	Slippery Rock	2002	Air Force	West Point	2012	West Point	West Point	2022	West Point	West Point			
1973		No champ.	1983	USC		1993	West Point		2003	West Point	West Point	2013	West Point	West Point	2023	West Point	West Point			
1974	Willamette	No champ.	1984			1994			2004	North Carolina	North Carolina	2014	West Point	West Point	2024	West Point	West Point			

The following clubs won a national title in an open (adult) category (in these tournaments not all players were current students of the university):

- Men's Open Division (until 1999 the highest tier in the USA):
  - Adelphi University: 1971, 1972, 1973, 1974
  - Air Force: 1978, 2004
  - UCLA: 1979
  - University of Utah: 2005
  - West Point: 2006
- Men's Elite Division (highest tier since 2000):
  - No team has won the title. West Point has one silver and two bronze medals.
- Women's Open Division (highest tier in the USA):
  - Kansas State University: 1975
  - Ohio State: 1978
  - University of Minnesota: 1990

== Team Tennis, Co-ed (WTT format) ==
USTA Tennis on Campus, club-level only

Year and Champion
2000 North Carolina
2001 North Carolina
2002 Texas A&M
2003 Florida
2004 Texas A&M
2005 Texas A&M
2006 Texas A&M
2007 Texas A&M
2008 Texas
2009 Duke
2010 California
2011 UCLA
2012 California
2013 Georgia
2014 California
2015 California
2016 Auburn
2017 Michigan
2018 Ohio State
2019 UCLA
2020 cancelled
2021 cancelled
2022 UCLA
2023 Virginia
2024 California
2025 California
2026 UCLA

== Tennis, Indoor ==
Intercollegiate Tennis Association (1973–present) Division I

Year	Men	Year	Men	Women	Year	Men	Women	Year	Men	Women
1929	Lehigh	1988	Southern California	Florida	2006	Georgia	Stanford	2024	Ohio State	Oklahoma State
1930	Lehigh	1989	California	Stanford	2007	Georgia	Georgia Tech	2025	Wake Forest	Georgia
1931	Yale	1990	Stanford	Stanford	2008	Virginia	Georgia Tech	2026	Texas	Georgia
1973	Stanford	1991	UCLA	Florida	2009	Virginia	Northwestern	2027		
1974	Not held	1992	Stanford	Florida	2010	Virginia	Northwestern	2028		
1975	Stanford	1993	UCLA	Stanford	2011	Virginia	Stanford	2029		
1976	Stanford	1994	Stanford	Georgia	2012	Southern California	UCLA	2030		
1977	Trinity (TX)	1995	Stanford	Georgia	2013	Virginia	North Carolina	2031		
1978	Stanford	1996	UCLA	Florida	2014	Ohio State	Duke	2032		
1979	SMU	1997	UCLA	Florida	2015	Oklahoma	North Carolina	2033		
1980	California	1998	Stanford	Stanford	2016	North Carolina	California	2034		
1981	Not held	1999	UCLA	Florida	2017	Virginia	Florida	2035		
1982	Pepperdine	2000	Stanford	Stanford	2018	Wake Forest	North Carolina	2036		
1983	SMU	2001	UCLA	Stanford	2019	Ohio State	Georgia	2037		
1984	UCLA	2002	Stanford	Georgia	2020	USC	North Carolina	2038		
1985	Stanford	2003	Illinois	Duke	2021	North Carolina	North Carolina	2039		
1986	Pepperdine	2004	Illinois	Stanford	2022	TCU	North Carolina	2040		
1987	Southern California	2005	Baylor	Stanford	2023	TCU	North Carolina	2041		

Division II (2020 - present)

Year	Men	Women
2020	Columbus State	Barry
2021	Columbus State	Indianapolis
2022	Barry	Barry
2023	Saint Leo	Barry
2024	Barry	Barry
2025	West Florida	Barry
2026	Barry	Barry

Division III (2001 - present)

Year	Men	Women
2001	UC Santa Cruz	
2002	Gustavus Adolphus	
2003	Gustavus Adolphus	
2004	Emory	
2005	Emory	
2006	Gustavus Adolphus	
2007	UC Santa Cruz	
2008	Gustavus Adolphus	
2009	Emory	Carnegie Mellon
2010	UC Santa Cruz	Emory
2011	Emory	Emory
2012	Emory	Washington and Lee
2013	Kenyon	Johns Hopkins
2014	Washington U-St. Louis	Johns Hopkins
2015	Trinity	Johns Hopkins
2016	Emory	Pomona-Pitzer
2017	Emory	Emory
2018	Emory	Emory
2019	Chicago	Emory
2020	Emory	Claremont-Mudd-Scripps
2021	cancelled	cancelled
2022	Case Western Reserve	Chicago
2023	Case Western Reserve	Chicago
2024	Emory	Claremont-Mudd-Scripps
2025	Claremont-Mudd-Scripps	Chicago
2026	Claremont-Mudd-Scripps	Claremont-Mudd-Scripps

NAIA (2023 - present)

Year	Men	Women
2023	Keiser	
2024	Georgia Gwinnett	Georgia Gwinnett
2025	Georgia Gwinnett	Keiser
2026	Georgia Gwinnett	Keiser

== Trap & skeet shooting ==
Association of College Unions International annually sponsors the National Intercollegiate Trap and Skeet Championships. The championships are the only national tournament in which shooters may compete in five different clay target games in the same program: American Trap, International Trap, American Skeet, International Skeet and Sporting Clays. The 2011 championship event is "the 43rd of the championship's history."

Year	Champion	Year	Champion
1969	?	1976	Trinity University
1970	?	1977	Trinity University
1971	?	1978	Texas A&M
1972	?	1979	?
1973	?	1980	Trinity University
1974	?	1981	?
1975	Trinity University (San Antonio)	1982	Texas A&M

1983–1995: ?

Year	Champion	Year	Champion	Year	Champion	Year	Champion	Year	Champion	Year	Champion
1996	Purdue	2002	Purdue	2008	Lindenwood	2014	Lindenwood	2020		2026	Lindenwood
1997	Purdue	2003	Purdue	2009	Lindenwood	2015	Lindenwood	2021		2027	
1998	Purdue	2004	Lindenwood	2010	Lindenwood	2016	Lindenwood	2022		2028	
1999	Purdue	2005	Lindenwood	2011	Lindenwood	2017		2023	Texas A&M	2029	
2000	Purdue	2006	Lindenwood	2012	Lindenwood	2018		2024	Lindenwood	2030	
2001	Trinity Univ. (TX)	2007	Lindenwood	2013	Lindenwood	2019	Texas A&M	2025	Lindenwood	2031	

Division II
2015: Texas A&M

== Triathlon ==
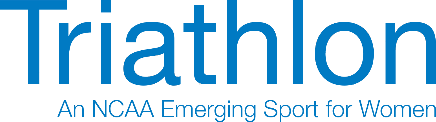
Logo of ESW Triathlon

Triathlon became an NCAA Emerging Sports for Women in 2014.

USA Triathlon

Year	Men	Women	Combined	Ref.
1992	?	?	?	
1993	?	?	?	
1994	?	?	Colorado	
1995	?	?	Cal Poly-San Luis Obispo	
1996	?	?	Colorado	
1997	?	?	Colorado	
1998	?	?	Colorado	
1999	?	?	Colorado	
2000	?	?	Colorado	
2001	?	?	Montana	
2002	US Naval Academy	Colorado	Colorado	
2003	US Naval Academy	Colorado	Colorado	
2004	UC Berkeley	Colorado	Colorado	
2005	Colorado	Colorado	Colorado	
2006 *	UC Berkeley	Montana	Montana	
2007	US Naval Academy	US Naval Academy	US Naval Academy	
2008	UC Berkeley	UC San Diego	UC Berkeley	
2009	UC Berkeley	UC San Diego	US Naval Academy	
2010	Colorado	US Military Academy	Colorado	
2011	Colorado	US Naval Academy	Colorado	
2012	Colorado	Colorado	Colorado	
2013	Colorado	UC Berkeley	Colorado	
2014	Colorado	UCLA	Colorado	
2015	US Naval Academy	UCLA	Colorado	
2016	Colorado	UCLA	Colorado	
2017	US Naval Academy	Colorado	Colorado	
2018	US Naval Academy	UC Berkeley	US Naval Academy	
2019	Queens University	UC Berkeley	Queens University	
2020	Not contested			
2021	UC Berkeley	UC Berkeley	UC Berkeley	
2022	Queens University	UC Berkeley	Queens University	
2023	Queens University	UC Berkeley	Queens University	
2024	Queens University	Colorado	Queens University	
2025	Wingate	US Naval Academy	Queens University	
2026	Wingate	US Military Academy	Queens University	

* 2006 event was a duathlon (water temperature too cold for swim), with 5K run, 40K bike and 10K run segments.

== Tug-of-War ==
Intercollegiate Association of Amateur Athletes of America

Conducted at the annual track and field championship meet.

Year	Champion	Year	Champion
1880	Columbia	1886	Harvard
1881	Princeton	1887	Columbia
1882	Columbia	1888	Harvard
1883	Lafayette (PA)	1889	Columbia
1884	Harvard	1890	Columbia
1885	Harvard	1891	Columbia

== Ultimate ==
Ultimate Players Association (1979-2010), USA Ultimate (2010–present)

Division I

Year	Open Champion	Year	Open Champion	Year	Open Champion	Year	Open Champion	Year	Women's Champion	Year	Women's Champion	Year	Women's Champion	Year	Women's Champion
1984	Stanford	1996	UC Santa Barbara	2008	Wisconsin	2020	Cancelled due to COVID-19			1996	UNC Wilmington	2008	British Columbia	2020	Cancelled due to COVID-19
1985	Pennsylvania	1997	UC Santa Barbara	2009	Carleton College (MN)	2021	North Carolina - Chapel Hill			1997	Stanford	2009	UC Santa Barbara	2021	North Carolina - Chapel Hill
1986	Massachusetts	1998	UC Santa Barbara	2010	Florida	2022	North Carolina - Chapel Hill			1998	Stanford	2010	Oregon	2022	North Carolina - Chapel Hill
1987	Chabot CC (CA)	1999	NC State	2011	Carleton College	2023	North Carolina - Chapel Hill	1987	Kansas	1999	Stanford	2011	UC Santa Barbara	2023	North Carolina - Chapel Hill
1988	UC Santa Barbara	2000	Brown	2012	Pittsburgh	2024	Brown	1988	UC Santa Barbara	2000	Carleton College	2012	Washington	2024	North Carolina - Chapel Hill
1989	UC Santa Barbara	2001	Carleton College	2013	Pittsburgh	2025	Carleton	1989	UC Davis	2001	Georgia	2013	Oregon	2025	British Columbia
1990	UC Santa Barbara	2002	Stanford	2014	Colorado	2026	Massachusetts	1990	UC Santa Barbara	2002	UC San Diego	2014	Ohio State	2026	Carleton
1991	UC Santa Cruz	2003	Wisconsin	2015	North Carolina - Chapel Hill	2027		1991	UC Santa Barbara	2003	Stanford	2015	Oregon	2027	
1992	Oregon	2004	Colorado	2016	Minnesota	2028		1992	UNC Wilmington	2004	UC Davis	2016	Stanford	2028	
1993	UNC Wilmington	2005	Brown	2017	Carleton College	2029		1993	UC Berkeley	2005	Stanford	2017	Dartmouth	2029	
1994	East Carolina	2006	Florida	2018	North Carolina - Chapel Hill	2030		1994	UC Santa Cruz	2006	Stanford	2018	Dartmouth	2030	
1995	East Carolina	2007	Wisconsin	2019	Brown	2031		1995	UC Santa Cruz	2007	Stanford	2019	UC San Diego	2031	

Division III

Year	Open Champion	Year	Women's Champion
2010	Carleton	2010	Pacific Lutheran
2011	Claremont	2011	Carleton
2012	Carleton	2012	Claremont
2013	Middlebury	2013	Bowdoin
2014	Bentley	2014	Rice
2015	Franciscan	2015	Rice
2016	Georgia College	2016	Carleton
2017	Richmond	2017	Carleton
2018	Bryant	2018	St. Olaf
2019	Middlebury	2019	Oberlin
2021	Oklahoma Christian	2021	Middlebury
2022	Oklahoma Christian	2022	Middlebury
2023	Colorado College	2023	Middlebury
2024	St. Olaf	2024	Portland
2024	Middlebury	2024	Wesleyan
2025	Lewis & Clark	2025	Wesleyan
2026	Middlebury	2026	Middlebury

== Wakeboarding ==
American Wakeboard Association (2001-2004), USA Wakeboard (2005–present), College Wake (2010–present)

Year	Champion	Year	USA Wakeboard Champion	College Wake Champion
2001	Wisconsin–La Crosse	2010	CSU - Chico	Texas
2002	Florida Southern	2011	Tennessee	South Florida
2003	Florida Southern	2012	CSU - Chico	CSU - Chico
2004	Central Florida	2013	Central Washington	Arizona State
2005	Central Florida	2014	Arizona State	Arizona State
2006 (Note: The spring 2006–2012 USA Wakeboard events were part of the CBS Sports "Collegiate Nationals " and "Alt Games" presentations.)	Florida (spring), Central Florida (fall)	2015	Florida	Texas A&M
2007	Central Florida	2016	Florida	Florida
2008	Florida	2017	(fall)	
2009	Florida	2018		

Cable Wakeboarding

Year	Champion
2009	Texas State
2013	Central Florida
2014	Central Florida
2015	Baylor
2016	Central Florida

== Water skiing ==
National Collegiate Water Ski Association

Year and Champion	Year and Champion	Year and Champion (Division I)	Year and Champion (Division II)	Year and Champion (Division I)	Year and Champion (Division II)
1979 San Diego State	1991 Central Florida	2002 Louisiana-Monroe (Div I-A)	2002 Rollins College (FL) (Div I)	2014 Louisiana-Monroe	2014 Clemson
1980 Northeast Louisiana	1992 Central Florida	2003 Louisiana (formerly Southwestern Louisiana)	2003 Rollins College	2015 Louisiana	2015 Western Washington
1981 Northeast Louisiana	1993 Northeast Louisiana	2004 Louisiana-Monroe	2004 UC San Diego	2016 Louisiana-Monroe	2016 Miami University (Ohio)
1982 Northeast Louisiana	1994 Northeast Louisiana	2005 Louisiana	2005 Texas A&M	2017 Louisiana-Monroe	2017 Miami of Ohio
1983 Northeast Louisiana	1995 Southwestern Louisiana	2006 Louisiana-Monroe	2006 San Diego State	2018 Louisiana-Monroe	2018 Cal Poly San Luis Obispo
1984 Northeast Louisiana	1996 Northeast Louisiana	2007 Louisiana-Monroe	2007 Texas State	2019 Louisiana	2019 Miami of Ohio
1985 Northeast Louisiana	1997 Southwestern Louisiana	2008 Louisiana-Monroe	2008 Cincinnati	2020 Cancelled	2020 Cancelled
1986 Northeast Louisiana	1998 Northeast Louisiana	2009 Louisiana-Monroe	2009 Wisconsin	2021 Louisiana	2021 Michigan
1987 Northeast Louisiana	1999 Louisiana-Monroe (formerly Northeast Louisiana)	2010 Louisiana	2010 Ohio State	2022 Louisiana	2022 Texas A&M
1988 Northeast Louisiana	2000 Louisiana-Monroe	2011 Louisiana-Monroe	2011 Texas State	2023 Louisiana	2023 Michigan
1989 Rollins College	2001 Arizona State	2012 Louisiana-Monroe	2012 Clemson	2024 Louisiana	2024 Wisconsin-La Crosse
1990 Northeast Louisiana	2001 Arizona State	2013 Louisiana-Monroe	2013 UC Davis	2025 Louisiana	2025 San Diego State

Barefoot Waterskiing

Year	Champion
2004	Wisconsin

== Weightlifting ==
USA Weightlifting

Year	Men	Coed	Women
19??			
1953	Notre Dame		
1957	Louisiana		
19??			
1963	Louisiana		
1964	Michigan State		
1965	Louisiana		
1966	Louisiana		
1967	Louisiana		
1968	Louisiana		
1969	Louisiana		
1970	Canceled		
1971	Louisiana		
19??			
1977	Virginia Tech		
1978	Virginia Tech		
1979	Virginia Tech		
1980	?		
1981	?		
1982	?		
1983	Virginia Tech		
1984	?		
1985	?		
1986	?		
1987	Texas A&M		
19??			
1993	?		?
1999	Montana State		
2000			
2001	McNeese State (LA)		?
200?			
2006	LSU-Shreveport		
2007	LSU-Shreveport	Northern Michigan	no team entrants
2008	LSU-Shreveport	LSU-Shreveport	Emory (GA)
2009	LSU-Shreveport	LSU-Shreveport	LSU-Shreveport
2010	Northern Michigan	Northern Michigan	LSU-Shreveport
2011	LSU-Shreveport	LSU-Shreveport	LSU-Shreveport
2012	LSU-Shreveport	Northern Michigan	Northern Michigan
2013	LSU-Shreveport	LSU-Shreveport	
2014	Georgia	Lindenwood	Georgia
2015	Northern Michigan	Northern Michigan	Northern Michigan
2016	Northern Michigan	Lindenwood	Northern Michigan
2017			
2018	Lindenwood		East Tennessee State
2019			
2020		Northern Michigan	
2021	Lenoir-Rhyne	Northern Michigan	East Tennessee State
2022	Lenoir-Rhyne	Lenoir-Rhyne	Florida
2023	Florida	Lindenwood	Lindenwood
2024	Florida	Lindenwood	Florida
2025	Lindenwood	Mars Hill	Lindenwood
2026	Lindenwood	Lindenwood	Lindenwood

== Wrestling, Women ==
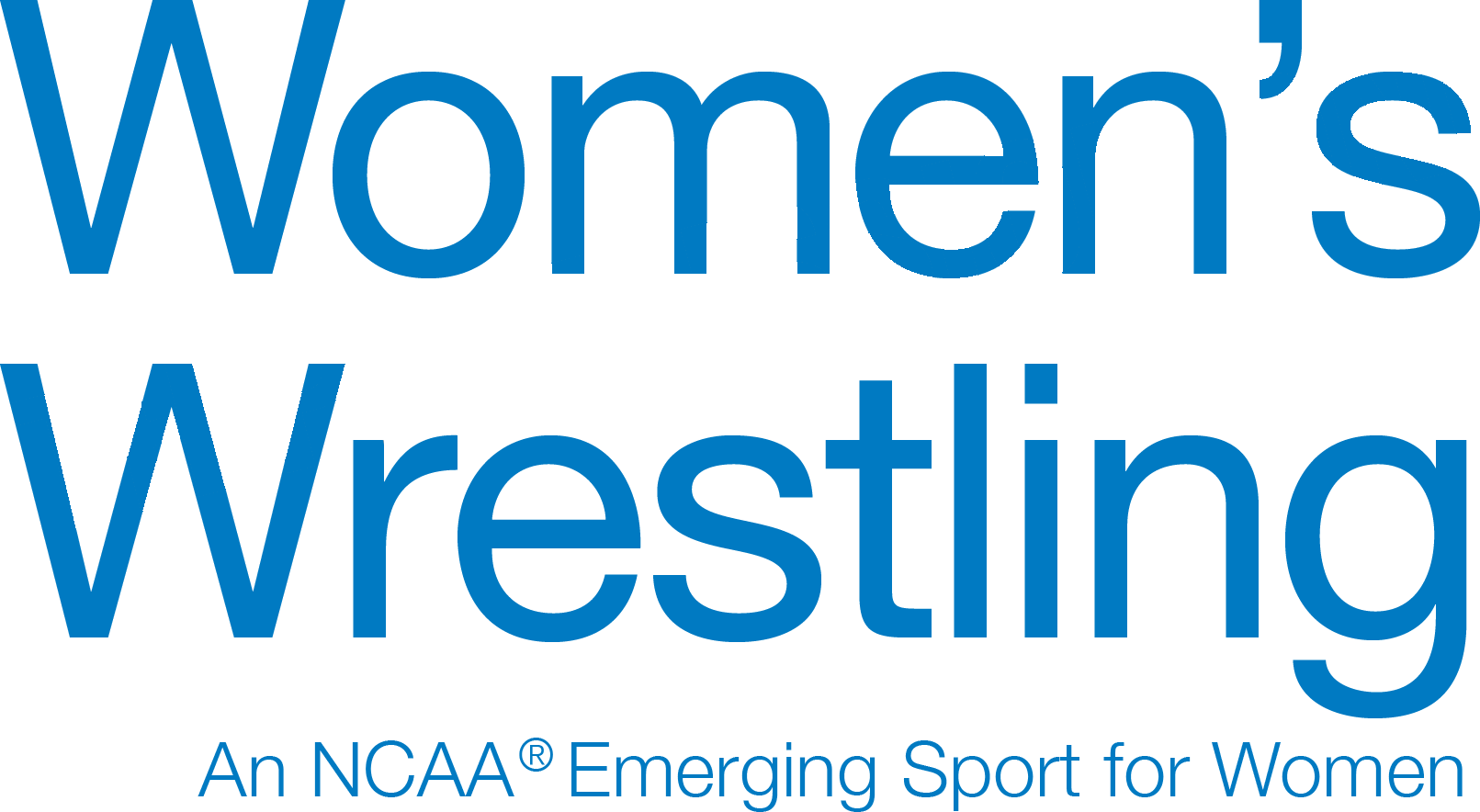
Logo of ESW Wrestling

Women's Collegiate Wrestling Association
Olympic-style (freestyle)

Year	Champion
2004	Missouri Valley College
2005	Missouri Valley College
2006	University of the Cumberlands (KY)
2007	University of the Cumberlands
2008	University of the Cumberlands
2009	Oklahoma City University
2010	Oklahoma City University
2011	Oklahoma City University
2012	Oklahoma City University
2013	Simon Fraser University (BC)
2014	King University (TN)
2015	King University
2016	King University
2017	King University
2018	Campbellsville University (KY)
2019	Menlo College (CA)
2020	Campbellsville University
2021	canceled

National Collegiate Wrestling Association
Collegiate-style (folkstyle)

Year	Champion
2008	Simon Fraser University (BC)
2009	Yakima Valley CC (WA)
2010	Yakima Valley CC
2011	Yakima Valley CC
2012	Southwestern Oregon CC
2013	Southwestern Oregon CC
2014	Southwestern Oregon CC
2015	Southwestern Oregon CC
2016	Southwestern Oregon CC
2017	Southwestern Oregon CC
2018	Southwestern Oregon CC
2019	Grays Harbor College (WA)
2020	Schreiner University (TX)
2021	NCWA season canceled
2022	Big Bend Community College (WA)
2023	Ottawa University–Arizona
2024	Grays Harbor
2025	Tarleton State
2026	Tarleton State

National Association of Intercollegiate Athletics
Olympic-style (freestyle)

Year	Champion
2019#	Menlo College
2020#	canceled, pandemic
2021#	Campbellsville University
2022#	Campbellsville University
2023	Southern Oregon
2024	Menlo College
2025	Life University
2026	Life University

#invitational tournament

Women’s Collegiate Wrestling Coalition
Olympic-style (freestyle)
National Collegiate Women's Wrestling Championship for NCAA schools

Year	Champion
2020	McKendree University (IL)
2021	McKendree University
2022	McKendree University
2023	North Central (IL)
2024	Iowa
2025	Iowa

• Starting in 2026, the NCAA will sponsor a women's team championship, apart from the above national championships.

== Intercollegiate team champions of NCAA and AIAW sports ==
Many team sports that are played at the collegiate level are currently, or at one time were, governed by multi-sport intercollegiate athletic associations that were organized to meet the needs of their member colleges and universities. The oldest of these is the National Collegiate Athletic Association (NCAA), founded in 1906 to address the rash of serious injuries and deaths arising in the collegiate sport of American football. It conducted its first team national championship events in the sport of track and field in 1921. Over the years, the NCAA has added championship events for a variety of sports, with divisions of competition based upon school size and enrollment, and now conducts over 90 championships. Before NCAA events were initiated in particular sports, national governing bodies for many of those sports typically conducted annual collegiate championship events.

The organization that is now the National Association of Intercollegiate Athletics (NAIA) began in 1937 with the first collegiate men's basketball tournament, which led to the formation of the National Association of intercollegiate Basketball in 1940. It serves primarily small colleges. With the growth of organized women's intercollegiate sports, the Division for Girls' and Women's Sports first conducted women's championship events and later created the Association for Intercollegiate Athletics for Women (AIAW) in 1972 to govern women's sports at the collegiate level, coinciding with the advent of Title IX federal legislation. The NCAA later usurped the mission of the AIAW by conducting its first women's championships in twelve sports directly head-to-head with the AIAW in a year of dual team championships in 1981–82. The AIAW was legally dissolved in 1983.

NCAA Team Champions: see NCAA Championships

Pre-NCAA Team Champions: see Pre-NCAA intercollegiate championships

AIAW Team Champions: see AIAW and DGWS Championships

NAIA Team Champions: see NAIA Championships

== See also ==
- List of NCAA schools with the most NCAA Division I championships
- List of NCAA schools with the most Division I national championships
- List of NCAA schools with the most AIAW Division I national championships
