= Department of the Air Force Athlete of the Year =

United States military athletic award

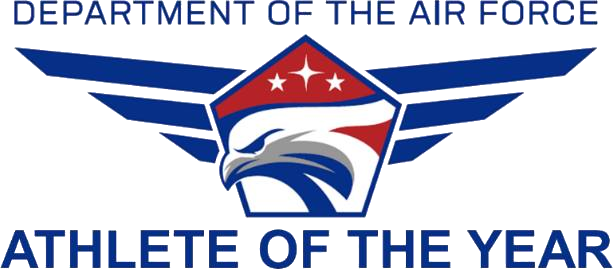
Logo

The Department of the Air Force Athlete of the Year is a yearly award for the best male and female athlete of the United States Air Force and United States Space Force. Many winners were part of the United States Air Force World Class Athlete Program. Until 2021 it was named United States Air Force Athlete of the Year.

== Men ==
Year	Rank	Name	Sport(s)
1989	Major	Steven Pecinovsky	Race walking
1990	Sergeant	Todd Stehman	Indoor volleyball
1991	Captain	William Burton Roy (Note: Additionally William Burton Roy became 1991 Armed Forces Male Athlete of the Year)	Shooting
1992
1993
1994	Captain	Michael Buonaugurio	Triathlon
1995	Staff sergeant	Ronald Simms	Boxing
1996	First Lieutenant	David DeGraaf	Handball
1997	Captain	Mark T. Cucuzella	Marathon
1998
1999	Second Lieutenant	Robert L. Dickie III	Cross country running Track and Field
2000	Captain	Stephen Goodman	Triathlon
2001	Sergeant	Steven B. Woods	Wrestling
2002	Staff sergeant	Anthony D. Patrick	Softball
2003	Captain	Kevin Eastler	Race walking
2004	Captain	James Parker	Hammer throwing
2005	Major	Roger Sherman	Shooting
2006	Master sergeant	Martin Bedford	Bowling
2007	Second Lieutenant	Ken Corigliano	Triathlon
2008	Technical sergeant	Michael Bergquist	Road cycling
2009	Captain	Ian Holt	Road cycling
2010	Captain	James Bales	Triathlon
2011	Captain	Weston Kelsey	Fencing
2012	Staff sergeant	Bradley T. Williams	Triathlon
2013	Captain	Ascenzo Bonitati II	Taekwondo
2014	Lieutenant colonel	Benjamin D. Boehm	Rowing
2015	Staff sergeant	John H. Allen	Baseball
2016	First Lieutenant	Cale Simmons	Pole vault
2017	Major	Ian Holt -2-	Road cycling
2018	Second Lieutenant	James Jax	Baseball
2019	Captain	Andrew Donlin	Handball; Beach handball
2020	Airman first class	Michael Mannozzi	Racewalking
2021	Staff sergeant	Justin Southichack	Jujutsu
2022	Master sergeant	Kenneth Guinn	Wheelchair rugby Wheelchair basketball Sitting volleyball
2023	Captain	Andrew Donlin -2-	Handball; Beach handball

== Women ==
Year	Rank	Name	Sport(s)
1982	Officer	Gail Liberty	Shooting
1983 to 1990
1991	Captain	Barbara Faulkenberry	Racquetball
1992
1993
1994	Captain	Teresa R. Lewis	Modern pentathalon
1995
1996	Senior airman	Deena Wigger	Shooting
1997	Staff sergeant	Lori M. Eppard	Marathon
1998
1999	Major	Kimberly J. Markland	Marathon; Cross country running Track and Field
2000	First or Second Lieutenant	Nicole Mustilli	Fencing
2001	Second Lieutenant	Summer A. Deaton	Volleyball
2002	Second Lieutenant	Kristy L. Kuhlman	Soccer
2003	First Lieutenant	Laura McDonald	Rugby union Rugby sevens
2004
2005	Staff sergeant	Twyla Sears	Softball
2006	Captain	Linda Jeffery	Golf
2007
2008	Second Lieutenant	Dana Pounds	Javelin throwing
2009	Master sergeant	Karrie Warren	Softball
2010
2011	Airman first class	Emily Shertzer	Marathon
2012	Major	Elissa Ballas	Marathon
2013	Second Lieutenant	Samantha B. Morrison	Triathlon
2014	First Lieutenant	Sara E. Holman	Swimming
2015	First Lieutenant	Magin A. Day	Marathon; Cross country running
2016	Captain	Paige Blackburn	Discus throwing Javelin throwing
2017	Captain	Abby L. Hall	Indoor volleyball
2018	Major	Amy Natalini	Marathon
2019	Major	Andrea Matesick	Equestrian
2020	Captain	Amber Hansen	Weightlifting
2021	Airman first class	Kelly Curtis	Skeleton
2022	Technical sergeant	Evon Pennington	Bodybuilding
2023	First Lieutenant	Rose Smith	Triathlon
