= USAFA Team Handball =

Handball club from the US Air Force Academy

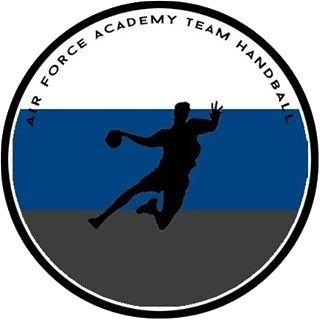
- Full name: United States Air Force Team Handball
- Short name: Air Force
- Founded: 1976 by Bob Djokovich & Thomas Schneeberger
- Arena: Cadet Gymnasium
- Head coach: Mike Cavanaugh
- Club colours
Home	Away

Location of USAFA Team Handball in Colorado

USAFA Team Handball is a handball club based in Air Force Academy, Colorado, United States. They are the handball team of the United States Air Force Academy. They are one of the most successful men's college teams. Besides Adelphi University and UCLA, they are the only college team to have won an adult national title, which they achieved in 1978.

== History ==
After the Falcons men's basketball team came second at the 1976 USA Team Handball National Tournament in the adults and collegiate divisions, the club was founded in 1976 by team captains Bob Djokovich and Thomas Schneeberger. Both Djokovich and Schneeberger appeared on the United States National Team at the 1984 Los Angeles Summer Olympics.

The club represented the national team at the 2015 Summer Universiade. They were joined by a student from Colorado State University.

== Accomplishments ==
- Nationals:
  - Men's Division I (as top tier):
    - 1 × Gold : 1978, 1977
    - 2 × Silver : 1976
  - Men's Division I (as second tier):
    - 1 × Gold : 2004
    - 3 × Bronze : 2014, 2015, 2016
  - Men's Division II (as third tier):
    - 2 × Gold : 2000, 2003
    - 1 × Silver : 2001
- College Nationals:
  - Men:
    - 3 × Gold : 1977, 1978, 2002
    - 4 × Silver : 1976, 1980, 2000, 2026
    - 10 × Bronze : 1999, 2004, 2006, 2007, 2008, 2009, 2014, 2016, 2017, 2019
  - Women:
    - 1 × Gold : 1988
    - 1 × Silver : 1980
- Carolina Blue Cup (men) :
  - Bronze : 1991

== Notable former players ==
Class	Name	Olympia	World	Note
1978	Bob Djokovich	1984 Los Angeles	None	Founder of the club; President of United States Team Handball Federation (2001–2004) and of USA Team Handball (2018–2019)
1978	Tom Schneeberger	1984 Los Angeles	None	Founder of the club
1984	Kathy Callaghan	1988 Seoul	None	1986 United States Armed Forces Athlete of the Year; Coached the USAFA women's team and won the 1988 College Nationals
1986	David W. Allvin	None	None	Chief of Staff of the United States Air Force since 2023; Highest ranked club alumni of all time
1993	David DeGraaf	1996 Atlanta	1995 Iceland	1996 United States Air Force Athlete of the Year; Was member of the United States Air Force World Class Athlete Program
2015	Andrew Donlin	None	2023 Poland / Sweden	First US born player who played professionally in Europe; 2019 & 2023 United States Air Force Athlete of the Year; Was member of the United States Air Force World Class Athlete Program

|2015| |Ryan Tucker || None|| 2015 World University Games
