= Air Force Falcons men's basketball statistical leaders =

The Air Force Falcons men's basketball statistical leaders are individual statistical leaders of the Air Force Falcons men's basketball program in various categories, including points, rebounds, assists, steals, and blocks. Within those areas, the lists identify single-game, single-season, and career leaders. The Falcons represent the United States Air Force Academy in the NCAA's Mountain West Conference.

Air Force began competing in intercollegiate basketball in 1956. The NCAA did not officially record assists as a stat until the 1983–84 season, and blocks and steals until the 1985–86 season, but Air Force's record books includes players in these stats before these seasons. These lists are updated through the end of the 2021–22 season.

== Scoring ==
Career
Rk	Player	Points	Seasons
1	Raymond Dudley	2,178	1986–87 1987–88 1988–89 1989–90
2	Otis Jones	2,003	1991–92 1992–93 1993–94 1994–95
3	Tim Harris	1,550	1977–78 1978–79 1979–80 1980–81
4	Lavelle Scottie	1,544	2016–17 2017–18 2018–19 2019–20
5	Michael Lyons	1,527	2009–10 2010–11 2011–12 2012–13
6	Bob Beckel	1,526	1956–57 1957–58 1958–59
7	A.J. Walker	1,410	2018–19 2019–20 2020–21 2021–22
8	Jarmica Reese	1,385	1994–95 1995–96 1996–97 1997–98
9	Cliff Parsons	1,374	1966–67 1967–68 1968–69
10	Ethan Taylor	1,324	2021–22 2022–23 2023–24 2024–25

Season
Rk	Player	Points	Season
1	Raymond Dudley	746	1988–89
2	Otis Jones	670	1994–95
3	Otis Jones	663	1993–94
4	Raymond Dudley	620	1989–90
5	Bob Beckel	555	1956–57
6	Cliff Parsons	540	1967–68
7	Michael Lyons	530	2012–13
8	Lavelle Scottie	501	2019–20
9	Dan Nwaelele	499	2006–07
	Bob Beckel	499	1957–58

Single game
Rk	Player	Points	Season	Opponent
1	Bob Beckel	50	1958–59	Arizona
2	Bob Beckel	48	1956–57	Eastern New Mexico
3	Bob Beckel	47	1956–57	Colorado Mines
4	Bob Beckel	46	1956–57	Kansas Wesleyan
5	Michael Lyons	45	2012–13	Colorado State
6	Otis Jones	42	1994–95	Adams State
	Chris Lowry	42	1990–91	Nicholls State
8	Jarmica Reese	40	1997–98	UNLV
9	Raymond Dudley	39	1989–90	Harvard
10	Raymond Dudley	38	1988–89	Portland

== Rebounds ==
Career
Rk	Player	Rebounds	Seasons
1	Reggie Jones	776	1977–78 1978–79 1979–80 1980–81
2	Cliff Parsons	720	1966–67 1967–68 1968–69
3	Tom Bellairs	694	1999–00 2000–01 2001–02 2002–03
4	Randy Gricius	689	1975–76 1976–77 1977–78 1978–79
5	Bob Djokovich	619	1974–75 1975–76 1976–77 1977–78
6	Tim Harris	604	1977–78 1978–79 1979–80 1980–81
7	Jacob Burtschi	600	2003–04 2004–05 2005–06 2006–07
8	Lavelle Scottie	599	2016–17 2017–18 2018–19 2019–20
	Tom Schneeberger	599	1974–75 1975–76 1976–77 1977–78
10	Mike Lockwood	552	1985–86 1986–87 1987–88 1988–89

Season
Rk	Player	Rebounds	Season
1	Cliff Parsons	293	1968–69
2	Tom Schneeberger	271	1976–77
3	Reggie Jones	264	1979–80
4	Reggie Jones	260	1980–81
5	Tom Bellairs	258	1999–00
6	Randy Gricius	254	1978–79
7	Cliff Parsons	229	1967–68
8	David Schuck	227	1998–99
9	Randy Gricius	224	1977–78
10	Ryan Swan	221	2018–19

Single game
Rk	Player	Rebounds	Season	Opponent
1	Miguel Garcia	19	1999–00	San Diego State
2	David Schuck	18	1998–99	SMU
3	Ryan Swan	17	2018–19	San Jose State
	Tom Bellairs	17	1999–00	San Diego State
	David Schuck	17	1998–99	Colorado State
6	Ryan Swan	16	2018–19	UNLV
	Reggie Jones	16	1980–81	UTEP
8	Jon Jordan	15	1984–85	Utah
	David Schuck	15	1998–99	UNLV
	Tom Bellairs	15	1999–00	New Mexico
	Tom Bellairs	15	1999–00	San Diego State
	Charlie Nelson	15	1995-96	Navy
	Kellan Boylan	15	2023-24	Portland State

== Assists ==
Career
Rk	Player	Assists	Seasons
1	Jeff Bowling	447	1986–87 1988–89 1989–90
2	Bob Djokovich	427	1974–75 1975–76 1976–77 1977–78
3	Ethan Taylor	394	2021–22 2022–23 2023–24 2024–25
4	Todd Fletcher	366	2009–10 2010–11 2011–12 2012–13
5	Todd Beer	355	1982–83 1983–84 1984–85 1985–86
6	Vernard Jenkins	328	1999–00 2000–01 2001–02 2002–03
7	Evan Washington	327	2007–08 2008–09 2009–10 2010–11
8	Trevor Lyons	309	2014–15 2015–16 2016–17 2017–18
9	A.J. Walker	286	2018–19 2019–20 2020–21 2021–22
10	Erwin Washington	276	1979–80 1980–81 1981–82 1982–83
	Jeffrey Mills	276	2021–22 2022–23 2023–24 2024–25

Season
Rk	Player	Assists	Season
1	Jeff Bowling	224	1989–90
2	Bob Djokovich	155	1976–77
3	Jeff Bowling	152	1988–89
4	Todd Beer	133	1985–86
5	Evan Washington	127	2010–11
	Bob Djokovich	127	1977–78
7	Kam Sanders	120	2025–26
8	Todd Fletcher	117	2012–13
9	Ethan Taylor	112	2024–25
10	Vernard Jenkins	111	2000–01

Single game
Rk	Player	Assists	Season	Opponent
1	Bob Djokovich	14	1976–77	Oklahoma City
	Jeff Bowling	14	1989–90	Pepperdine

== Steals ==
Career
Rk	Player	Steals	Seasons
1	Jacob Burtschi	196	2003–04 2004–05 2005–06 2006–07
2	Tim Anderson	175	2004–05 2005–06 2006–07 2007–08
3	Trevor Lyons	162	2014–15 2015–16 2016–17 2017–18
4	Ethan Taylor	152	2021–22 2022–23 2023–24 2024–25
5	Raymond Dudley	148	1986–87 1987–88 1988–89 1989–90
6	Otis Jones	147	1991–92 1992–93 1993–94 1994–95
7	Tim Keller	142	2001–02 2002–03 2003–04 2004–05
	Jeff Bowling	142	1986–87 1988–89 1989–90
9	Vernard Jenkins	141	1999–00 2000–01 2001–02 2002–03
10	Antoine Hood	134	2002–03 2003–04 2004–05 2005–06

Season
Rk	Player	Steals	Season
1	Jacob Burtschi	71	2005–06
2	Tim Anderson	67	2007–08
3	Tim Anderson	62	2006–07
	Jeff Bowling	62	1988–89
5	Jacob Burtschi	55	2006–07
6	Tyron Wright	53	1999–00
7	Jeff Bowling	51	1989–90
	Raymond Dudley	51	1988–89
9	Ethan Taylor	50	2024–25
10	Jacob Burtschi	49	2004–05

Single game
Rk	Player	Steals	Season	Opponent
1	Grant Best	7	2026–27	Calumet St. Joseph
	Max Yon	7	2013–14	Colorado Christian
	Chris Carter	7	2011–12	Army
	Tim Anderson	7	2007–08	San Diego State
	Jeff Bowling	7	1988–89	Hawaii

== Blocks ==
Career
Rk	Player	Blocks	Seasons
1	Reggie Jones	164	1977–78 1978–79 1979–80 1980–81
2	Taylor Broekhuis	83	2009–10 2010–11 2011–12 2012–13
3	Mike Lockwood	81	1985–86 1986–87 1987–88 1988–89
4	Joel Gerlach	68	2000–01 2001–02 2002–03 2003–04
	David Schuck	68	1997–98 1998–99
6	Bryce Morgan	64	1992–93 1993–94
7	Keaton Van Soelen	56	2017–18 2018–19 2019–20 2020–21
8	Charlie Nelson	53	1992–93 1993–94 1994–95 1995–96
9	Nick Welch	50	2002–03 2003–04 2004–05 2006–07
	Anthony Barrett	50	1992–93 1993–94 1994–95 1995–96

Season
Rk	Player	Blocks	Season
1	Bryce Morgan	45	1993–94
2	Lucas Moerman	42	2021–22
3	David Schuck	38	1998–99
4	Corbin Green	34	2022–23
5	John Frye	32	2005–06
6	Mike Lockwood	31	1987–88
7	David Schuck	30	1997–98
8	Taylor Broekhuis	29	2012–13
9	Taylor Broekhuis	28	2011–12
	Joel Gerlach	28	2002–03
	Maurice Anderson	28	1994–95
	Brad Boyer	28	1992–93

Single game
Rk	Player	Blocks	Season	Opponent
1	Corbin Green	6	2022–23	Arkansas-Pine Bluff
	Lucas Moerman	6	2021–22	San Jose State
	Taylor Broekhuis	6	2011–12	TCU
	Bryce Morgan	6	1993–94	Navy
	Bryce Morgan	6	1993–94	Doane
