= United States Air Force World Class Athlete Program =

Department of the Air Force World Class Athlete Program
- Active: 1996 – present
- Country: United States of America
- Allegiance: United States
- Branch: United States Air Force; United States Space Force
- Part of: Department of Defense Department of the Air Force; Installation and Mission Support Center; Air Force Services Center Department of the Air Force Fitness and Sports Division
- Nickname: WCAP

Commanders
- World Class Athlete Program Manager: Dale Filsell
- Chief, Department of the Air Force Fitness and Sports: Maj Tiffany Lewis
- Notable commanders: Lt Col (Sel) Aaron Tissot 2021-2023

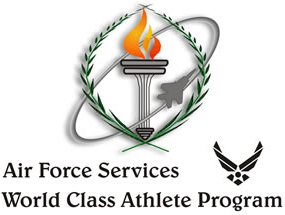
Old Logo

The Department of the Air Force World Class Athlete Program (WCAP) is a military program designed to support nationally and internationally ranked athlete Airmen and Guardians and prepare them to qualify for the U.S. Olympic team and compete at the highest level of international competition. Additionally, it provides current Olympians an avenue to serve the United States in a uniformed service capacity between training seasons. The program is falls under the DAF Fitness and Sports Division, Air Force Service Center, headquartered at Joint Base San Antonio, Texas. Program management of WCAP and the Department of the Air Force Shooting Program moved to Colorado Springs, Colorado in the spring of 2022 to better assist athletes and to be closer to the Olympic Training Center and its sister service WCAP Program Managers and Fort Carson, Colorado.

This program enables selected Department of the Air Force military athletes to focus on training and competing in a full-time status in preparation for Olympic competition. The selection process ensures participants are viable Olympic contenders who will serve as Department of the Air Force ambassadors as they compete nationally and internationally.

The name United States Air Force World Class Athlete Program was changed in 2021 to Department of the Air Force World Class Athlete Program when it onboarded its first Space Force service member, fencer, Capt. Leanne “Malibu” Brenner.

Program management operating location, updated recruitment strategy, refined entry standards and branding refresh reflect significant milestones in 2021–2022.

The DAF WCAP is currently governed by Department of the Air Force Instruction 34-114, Fitness, Sports and World Class Athlete Program. Several Department of the Air Force Athlete of the Year award winners were WCAP alumni or program hopefuls.

== Air Force WCAP founding ==
The World Class Athlete Program was first established by the Army as to centrally manage and support athletes under the provisions set in Public Law 84-11 which passed into law in March 1955. PL 84-11 afforded any Armed Forces service members an opportunity to perform at the international level while maintaining a military career.

At a Washington Touchdown Club Awards Banquet, General Ronald Fogleman inquired about the establishment of the WCAP program and asked if the Air Force might have a similar program for Airmen. Less than a year later, in Feb of 1996 the Air Force World Class Athlete Program was established and added to the Department of the Air Force Fitness and Sports portfolio.

== Historic highlights ==
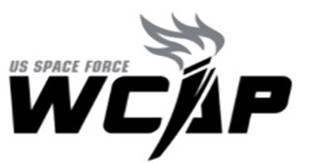
Logo for Space Force WCAP Athletes

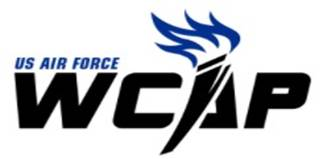
Logo for Air Force Athletes

The first official WCAP class was 1996. During its inaugural year, the program supported 19 full-time athletes.

Highest Olympic Finish: Second Lieutenant Weston "Seth" Kelsey (Men's Epee, 4th place) 2012 Summer Olympic Games in London, UK.

Recent WCAP Finish: Airman First Class Kelly Curtis (Women's Skeleton, 21st Place) 2022 Winter Olympic Games in Beijing, China.

2019: Introduction of the United States Space Force WCAP. This program is currently managed by the Air Force WCAP Program Manager.

2022: New branding introduced. This included service specific for Air Force and Space Force Athletes and Olympian WCAP logos.

2023: Length of participation in WACP expanded to 3 years. This allowed more time for athletes to train for trials and Olympic qualifications increasing likelihood of selection to TEAM USA.

== Current roster ==
Rank	Name	Sport	Class
Major	Drew Donlin	Handball	2028
Second Lieutenant	Viva Kreis	Handball	2028
Second Lieutenant	Wyatt Hendrickson	Freestyle wrestling	2028
Second Lieutenant	Sam Gilman	Track and Field: 1500 metres	2028
Senior Airman	Mariah Anderson	Greco-Roman wrestling	2028
Senior Airman	Tyler Evans	Modern Pentathlon	2028
Airman First Class	Duncan Nelson	Greco-Roman wrestling	2028
Airman First Class	Anita Alvarez	Synchronised swimming	2028
Airman First Class	Donavon Banks	Javelin throw	2028
Airman First Class	Nick Christie	Track and Field: Racewalking	2028
Airman First Class	Journey Figueroa	Boxing	2028
Airman First Class	Amere Lattin	400 metres hurdles	2028
Airman First Class	Brian Williams	Discus throw	2028
?	Unknown Airman	?	2028

== WCAP Olympians ==
14 WCAP athletes have represented the United States at the Olympics.

=== 1996 Summer Olympics ===
Eighteen of the 19 athletes in the program qualified for the Olympic Trials.

==== Olympians ====
Rank	Name	Sport	Result
Major	William Burton Roy	Shooting	9th in Men's Skeet
First Lieutenant	David DeGraaf	Handball	9th of 12; he scored a record 13 goals against Kuwait and a record of 7 blocked shots

==== Alternate ====
Rank	Name	Sport
Staff sergeant	Ronald Simms	Boxing

==== Coaching staff ====
Rank	Name	Sport
Master sergeant	Richard Estrella	As a coach for Greco-Roman wrestling

=== 1998 Winter Olympics ===
Deborah Nordyke was the only WCAP athlete to make Team USA. She joined the Air Force Alaska Air National Guard in 1987.

Rank	Name	Sport	Result
Airman first class	Deborah Nordyke	Biathlon	48th

=== 2000 Summer Olympics ===
Thirty-six of 38 athletes qualified for Olympic Trials. One alternate for Olympic skeet.

=== 2002 Winter Olympics ===
All three athletes qualified for the trials.

=== 2004 Summer Olympics ===
Twenty-three of 28 athletes qualified for Olympic Trials.

Three athletes were selected for the United States national baseball team. They lost in the quarterfinals of the 2004 Americas Olympic Baseball Qualifying Tournament and did not qualify for the Olympics.

Three alternates.

==== Olympians ====
Rank	Name	Sport
First Lieutenant	James Parker	Track and Field: Hammer throw
Captain	Kevin Eastler	Track and Field: Racewalking
Captain	Weston Kelsey	Fencing: Epee

=== 2006 Winter Olympics ===
All four athletes qualified for the trials.

=== 2008 Summer Olympics ===
Twenty-three of 24 athletes qualified for Olympic Trials.

Three alternates.

==== Olympians ====
Rank	Name	Sport
Captain	Eli Bremer	Modern pentathalon
Captain	Kevin Eastler	Track and Field: Racewalking
Captain	Weston Kelsey	Fencing
Major	Dominic Grazioli	Shooting

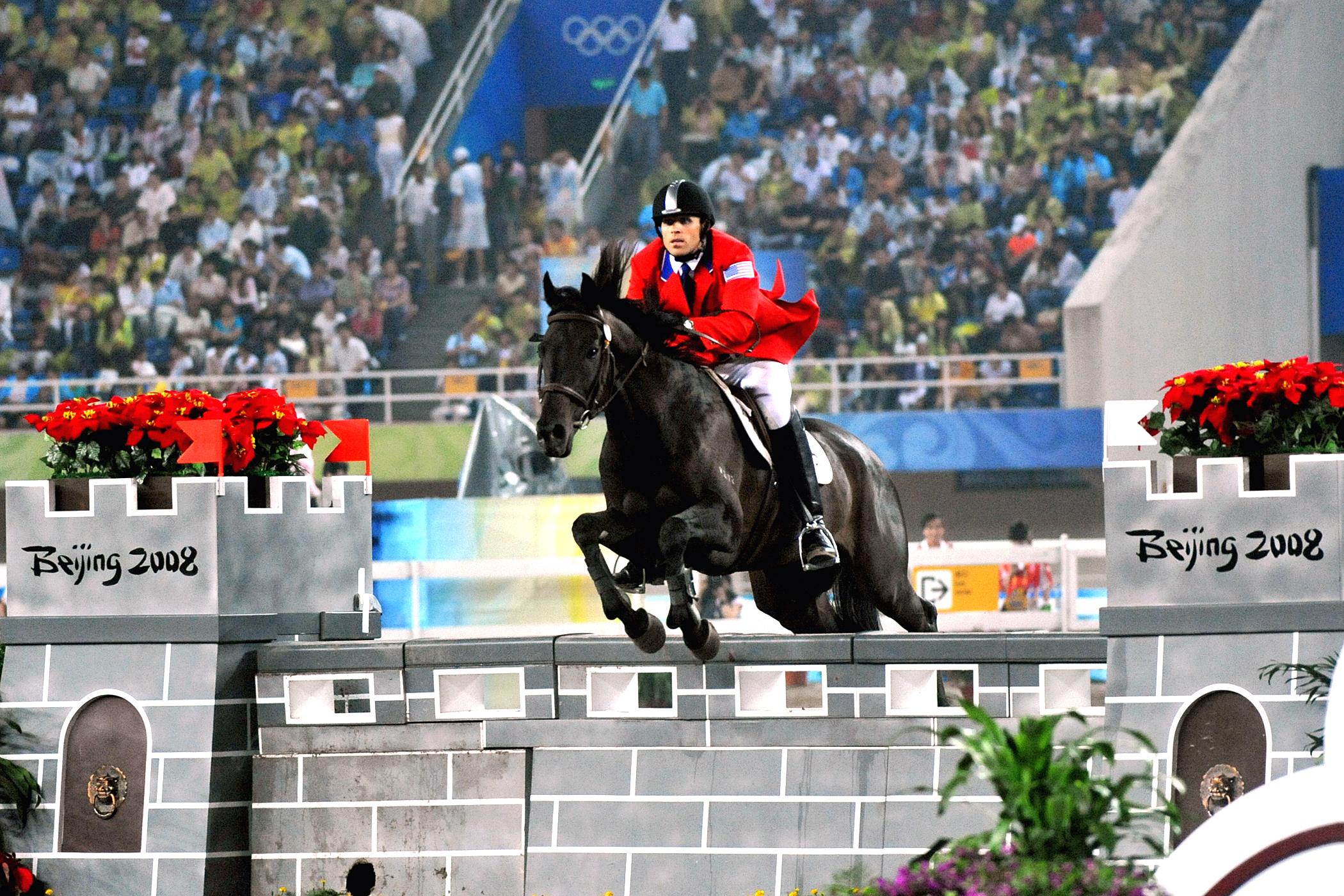
Eli Bremer, Class 2008

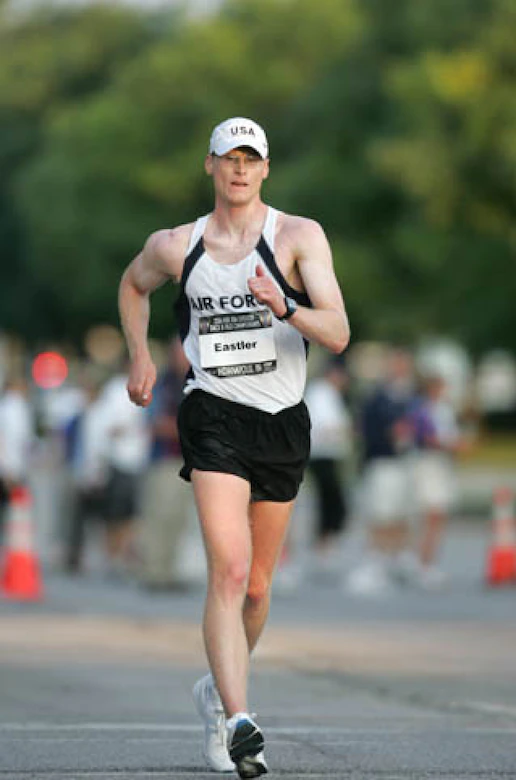
Kevin Eastler, Class 2008

=== 2010 Winter Olympics ===
Two athletes qualified for the trials. One was first alternate in Bobsled.

=== 2012 Summer Olympics ===
Twelve of 14 athletes qualified for Olympic Trials. Zero made the Olympic team.

==== Olympians ====
Rank	Name	Sport
Captain	Weston Kelsey	Fencing: Epee

=== 2014 Winter Olympics ===
One athlete qualified for the trials. He was first alternate in Bobsled.

=== 2016 Summer Olympics ===
There were 20 WCAP athletes, five competed in the trials and one went to the Olympics.

Rank	Name	Sport
First Lieutenant	Cale Simmons	Track and Field: Pole vault

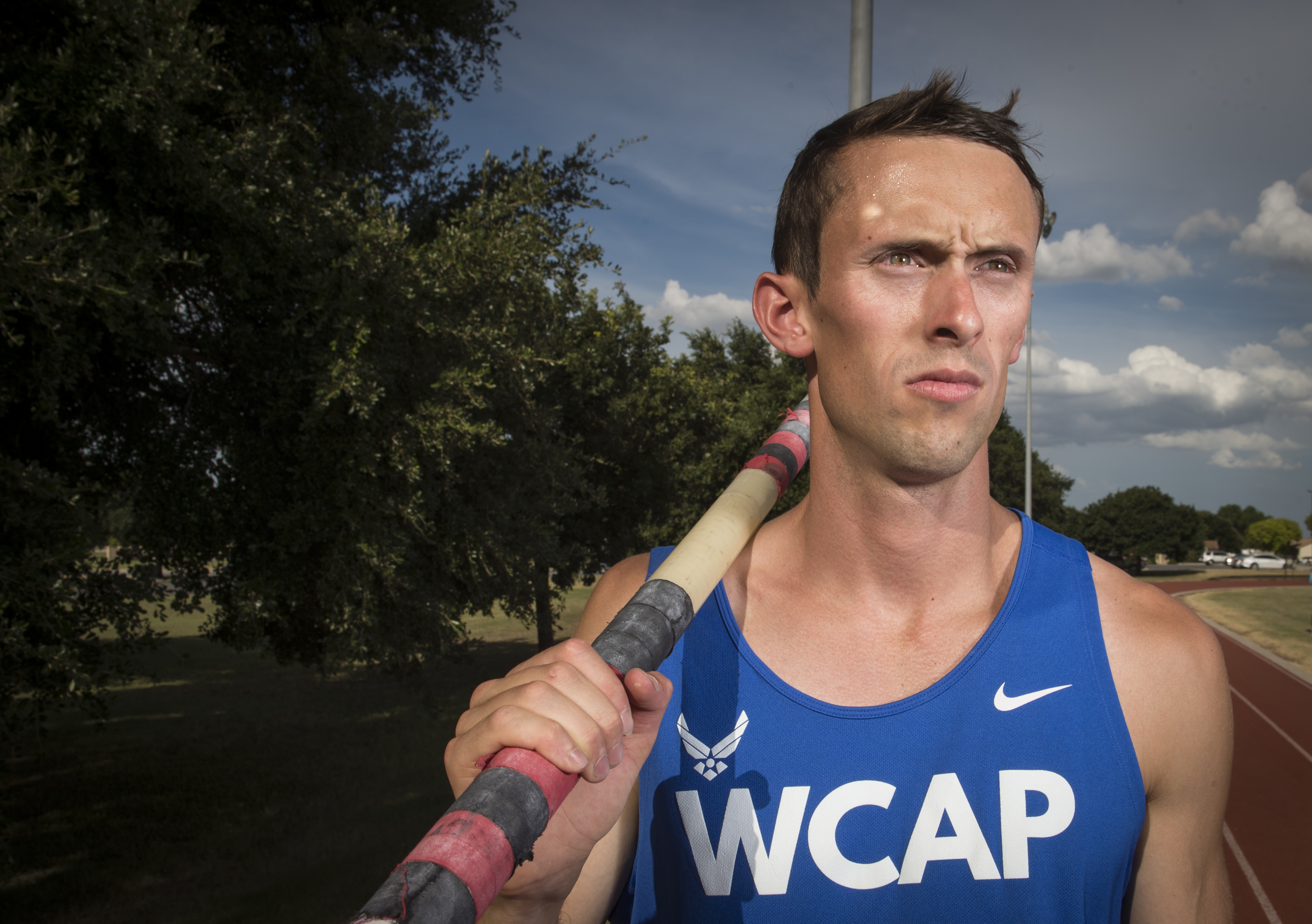
Cale Simmons, Class of 2016

=== 2018 Winter Olympics ===
No WCAP athletes qualified for the trials.

=== 2020 Summer Olympics ===
Due to COVID-19 pandemic caused the 2020 Tokyo games to be delayed.. The Air Force WCAP retained athletes in the program however, no Air Force athletes were able to qualify for the Olympics.

=== 2022 Winter Olympics ===
There were 6 WCAP athletes, six competed in the trials and one went to the Olympics.

Kelly Curtis was the only WCAP athlete to compete in the Olympics.

Rank	Name	Sport
Airman First Class	Kelly Curtis	Skeleton

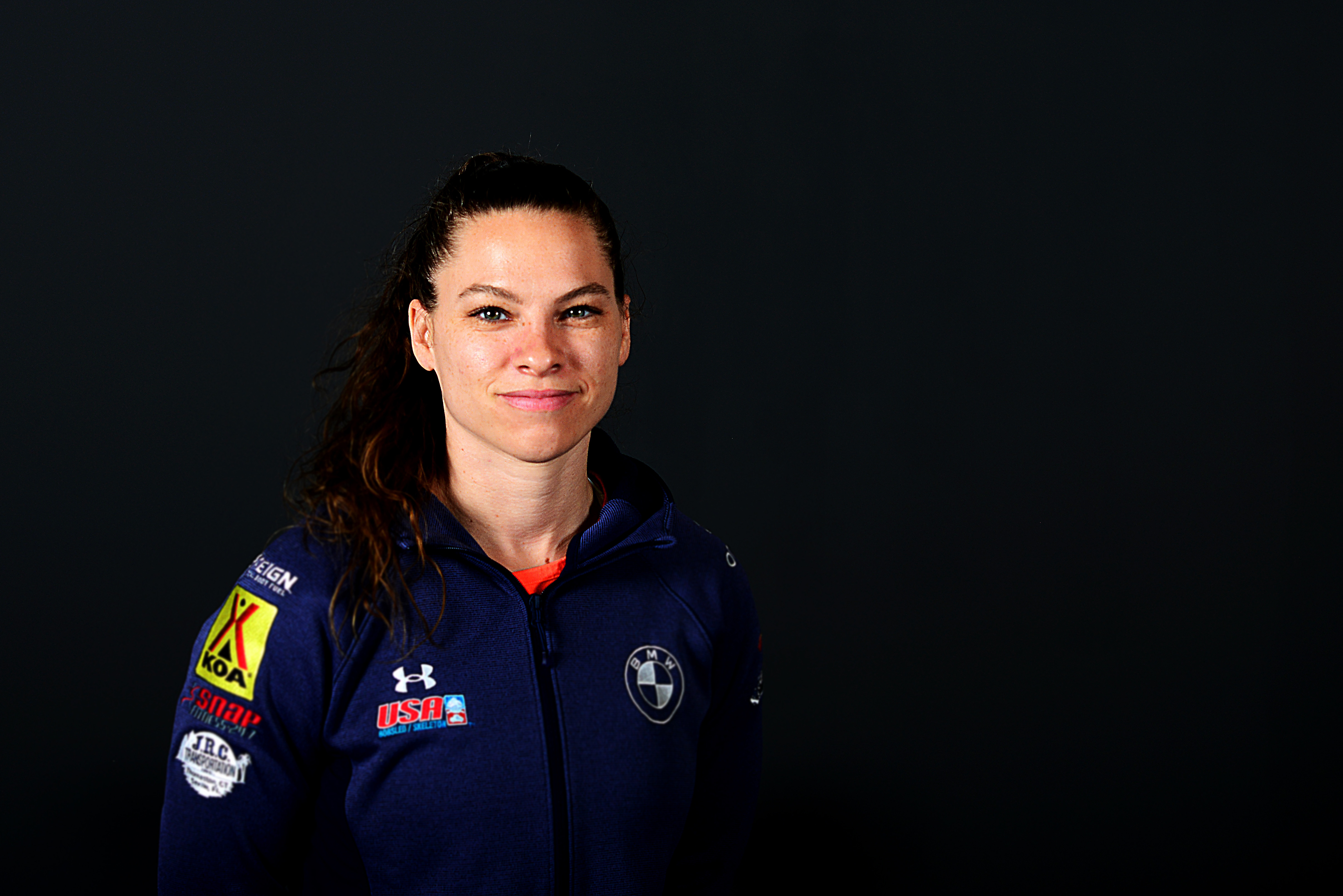
Kelly Curtis, Class of 2022

=== 2024 Summer Olympics ===
No WCAP athletes qualified for the trials.

=== 2026 Winter Olympics ===
Kelly Curtis (skeleton)

Jasmine Jones (bobsled) First WCAP athlete to earn an Olympic medal. A bronze medal at the two woman bobsled event.

=== Summary ===
Olympics	Roster	Trials	Alternate	Olympians
1996 Summer Olympics	19	18	1	3
1998 Winter Olympics	1	1	0	1
2000 Summer Olympics	38	36	1	0
2002 Winter Olympics	3	3	0	0
2004 Summer Olympics	28	23	3	3
2006 Winter Olympics	4	4	0	0
2008 Summer Olympics	24	23	0	4
2010 Winter Olympics	2	2	1	0
2012 Summer Olympics	14	12	0	1
2014 Winter Olympics	1	1	1	0
2016 Summer Olympics	20	5	0	1
2018 Winter Olympics	0	0	0	0
2020 Summer Olympics	28	0	0	0
2022 Winter Olympics	6	1	0	1
2024 Summer Olympics	13	?	?	0
2026 Winter Olympics	?	?	?	2
2028 Summer Olympics	14	TBA	TBA	TBA

== Sources ==
- Air Force World Class Athlete Program
- Public Law 84-11
