= 2018 USA Team Handball College Nationals =

2018 College Nationals
- Logo of the 2018 College Nationals
- Season: 2017-18
- Dates: 20 - 22 April 2018
- Champion: Men's: West Point Black; Women's: Pennsylvania State University
- All statistics correct as of 2018-04-19.

The 2018 College Nationals was the 23rd Men's and Women's College Nationals. The College Nationals was a team handball tournament to determined the College National Champion from 2018 from the US.

== Final ranking ==
=== Men's ranking ===
Rank	Team
1st place, gold medalist(s)	West Point Black (1)
2nd place, silver medalist(s)	University of Virginia (2т)
3rd place, bronze medalist(s)	West Point Gold (NR)
4	Air Force Academy (2т)
5	University of North Carolina (NR)
6	Ohio State Grey (4)
7	Texas A&M University (NV)
8	Pennsylvania State University (NV)
9	Ohio State Scarlet (NV)

=== Women's ranking ===
Rank	Team
1st place, gold medalist(s)	Pennsylvania State University
2nd place, silver medalist(s)	West Point Black
3rd place, bronze medalist(s)	University of North Carolina
4	West Point Gold
