= 2006 USA Team Handball College Nationals =

2006 College Nationals
- Season: 2005-06
- Champion: Men's: University of North Carolina; Women's: West Point Black
- All statistics correct as of 2018-08-07.

The 2006 College Nationals was the 11th Men's and Women's College Nationals. The College Nationals was a team handball tournament to determine the College National Champion from 2006 from the US.

== Final ranking ==
=== Men's ranking ===
Rank	Team
1st place, gold medalist(s)	University of North Carolina
2nd place, silver medalist(s)	West Point Black
3rd place, bronze medalist(s)	Air Force Academy
4	West Point Gold
5	Benedict College
6	Tar Heel
7	Carolina Rams

=== Women's ranking ===
Rank	Team
1st place, gold medalist(s)	West Point Black
2nd place, silver medalist(s)	University of North Carolina
3rd place, bronze medalist(s)	West Point Gold
4	Benedict College
5	Furman University
