= 2000 USA Team Handball College Nationals =

5th Men's and Women's College Nationals

2000 College Nationals
- Season: 1999-00
- Dates: 10 - 12. March 2000
- Champion: Men's: West Point Black; Women's: West Point Black
- All statistics correct as of 2018-02-10.

The 2000 College Nationals was the 5th Men's and Women's College Nationals. The College Nationals was a team handball tournament to determined the College National Champion from 2000 from the US.

== Final ranking ==
=== Men's ranking ===
Rank	Team
1st place, gold medalist(s)	West Point Black
2nd place, silver medalist(s)	Air Force Academy
3rd place, bronze medalist(s)	University of North Carolina
4	Georgia Southern University
5	West Point Gold
6	Middle Georgia State University
7	West Point Black
8	Furman University
9	Benedict College
10	Lander University
11	The Ohio State University

=== Women's ranking ===
Rank	Team
1st place, gold medalist(s)	West Point Black
2nd place, silver medalist(s)	Furman University
3rd place, bronze medalist(s)	West Point Gold
