= 2001 USA Team Handball College Nationals =

Handball tournament for US college national champion in 2001

2001 College Nationals
- Season: 2000-01
- Champion: Men's: West Point Black; Women's: West Point Gold
- All statistics correct as of 2018-04-29.

The 2001 College Nationals was the 6th Men's and Women's College Nationals. The College Nationals was a team handball tournament to determined the College National Champion from 2000 from the US.

== Final ranking ==
=== Men's ranking ===
Rank	Team
1st place, gold medalist(s)	West Point Black
2nd place, silver medalist(s)	University of North Carolina
3rd place, bronze medalist(s)	Middle Georgia State University
4	West Point Gold
5	Air Force Academy
6	Lander University
7	Georgia State University
8	Georgia Tech Gold
9	Georgia Tech White

=== Women's ranking ===
Rank	Team
1st place, gold medalist(s)	West Point Gold
2nd place, silver medalist(s)	West Point Black
3rd place, bronze medalist(s)	Lander University
