= 2002 USA Team Handball College Nationals =

2002 College Nationals
- Season: 2001-02
- Champion: Men's: Air Force; Women's: West Point Black
- All statistics correct as of 2018-04-29.

The 2002 College Nationals was the 7th Men's and Women's College Nationals. The College Nationals was a team handball tournament to determined the College National Champion from 2000 from the US.

== Final ranking ==
=== Men's ranking ===
Rank	Team
1st place, gold medalist(s)	Air Force Academy
2nd place, silver medalist(s)	West Point Black
3rd place, bronze medalist(s)	Middle Georgia State University
4	University of North Carolina
5	Georgia Institute of Technology
6	Benedict College
7	UNC Tar Heels
8	University of Memphis
9	University of Alabama
10	West Point Gold
11	Georgia State University

=== Women's ranking ===
Rank	Team
1st place, gold medalist(s)	West Point Black
2nd place, silver medalist(s)	University of North Carolina
3rd place, bronze medalist(s)	West Point Gold
