= Ron Perry =

Ron Perry may refer to:

- Ron Perry (athletic director) (born 1932), American athlete, coach, and athletics administrator
- Ron Perry (basketball, born 1943), American basketball player for Virginia Tech and several ABA teams
- Ron Perry (basketball, born 1958), American college basketball and baseball player at Holy Cross
- Ron Perry (music executive), American music executive
