= 2007 USA Team Handball College Nationals =

2007 College Nationals
- Season: 2006-07
- Champion: Men's: West Point Black; Women's: West Point Black
- All statistics correct as of 2018-02-13.

The 2007 College Nationals was the 12th Men's and Women's College Nationals. The College Nationals was a team handball tournament to determined the College National Champion from 2007 from the US.

== Final ranking ==
=== Men's ranking ===
Rank	Team
1st place, gold medalist(s)	West Point Black
2nd place, silver medalist(s)	University of North Carolina
3rd place, bronze medalist(s)	Air Force Academy B
4	Air Force Academy A
5	West Point Gold

=== Women's ranking ===
Rank	Team
1st place, gold medalist(s)	West Point Black
