= 2015 USA Team Handball College Nationals =

2015 College Nationals
- Logo of the 2015 College Nationals
- Season: 2014-15
- Dates: 3 - 5. April 2015
- Champion: Men's: West Point Black; Women's: West Point Black
- All statistics correct as of 2018-04-19.

The 2015 College Nationals was the 20th Men's and Women's College Nationals. The College Nationals was a team handball tournament to determined the College National Champion from 2015 from the US.

== Final ranking ==
=== Men's ranking ===
Rank	Team
1st place, gold medalist(s)	West Point Black
2nd place, silver medalist(s)	West Point Gold
3rd place, bronze medalist(s)	University of North Carolina
4	Texas A&M University
5	Air Force Academy
6	Miami University
7	Clemson University
8	Auburn University
9	The Ohio State University Scarlet
10	Illinois State University
11	University of Wisconsin–Milwaukee
12	The Ohio State University Grey

=== Women's ranking ===
Rank	Team
1st place, gold medalist(s)	West Point Black
2nd place, silver medalist(s)	University of North Carolina
3rd place, bronze medalist(s)	West Point Gold
