= United States Armed Forces Athlete of the Year =

The Armed Forces Athlete of the Year was a yearly award for the best male and female athlete of the United States Armed Forces. Some winners were part of a World Class Athlete Program like the U.S. Army World Class Athlete Program or the United States Air Force World Class Athlete Program. Since 1999 only the Athlete of the Year awards of the difference branches exists.

== Men ==
Year	Rank	Branch	Name	Sport(s)
1957	?	Marines	Ron Perry	Baseball; Basketball
1958				
1959	Second lieutenant	Marines	King Dixon	American football
1981	Sergeant	Marines	Greg Gibson	Wrestling
1982	Captain	Army	Dave Gilman	
1983	Captain	Army	Leo White	Judo
1984	Second lieutenant	Air Force	Alonzo Babers	400 metres sprint
1985	Sergeant	Army	Brian Bryant	Boxing
1986	Sergeant	Marines	Eric J. Wetzel	Wrestling
1987	Petty officer first class	Navy	David Butler	Wrestling
1988	Specialist 4	Army	Ray Mercer	Boxing
1989	Ensign	Navy	Alexander C. Cutler	Sailing
1990	Lance corporal	Marines	Sergio Reyes Jr.	Boxing
1991	Captain	Air Force	William B. Roy	Shooting
1992	Specialist	Army	Rodney S. Smith	Wrestling
1993	Sergeant	Marines	Douglas W. Marocco	Triathlon
1994	Specialist	Army	Benjamin D. McDowell	
1995	Specialist	Army	Dionicio A. Napier Jr.	
1996	Staff sergeant	Army	Derrick Waldroup	Wrestling
1997	Petty officer third class	Navy	Harold K. Montford	Triathlon; Pentathlon
1998	Second lieutenant	Army	Garrett Hines	Bobsleigh

Source 1981–1996:

== Women ==
Year	Rank	Branch	Name	Sport(s)
1986	First lieutenant	Air Force	Kathy Callaghan	Handball
1987	First lieutenant	Air Force	Gail Conway	
1988	Airman first class	Air Force	Priscilla G. Sweeney	
1989	First lieutenant	Air Force	Stacey B. Cagenello	Basketball
1990	Captain	Air Force	Teresa R. Lewis	
1991	Staff sergeant	Marines	Roxane C. Thompson	Shooting
1992	Lieutenant	Coast Guard	Lynn Mountcastle	Rowing
1993	Lieutenant	Coast Guard	Michelle Lauzon Kane	Marathon
1994	? Petty officer ? class	Navy	Elizabeth A. Evans	
1995	Captain	Marines	Karen Krajicek	
1996	Sergeant	Army	Theresa E. DeWitt	Shooting
1997	Specialist	Army	Niambi J. Dennis	Triple jump
1997	Lieutenant	Coast Guard	Amy L. Baribeau Later Cocanour	Triathlon
1998				
1999	Second lieutenant	Army	Julie Stolzer	Golf; Ironman; Marathon

Source 1986–1996:
