= 2019 USA Team Handball College Nationals =

2019 College Nationals
- Logo of the 2019 College Nationals
- Season: 2018-19
- Dates: 26–28 April 2019
- Champion: Men's: West Point Black; Women's: West Point Black
- All statistics correct as of 2019-04-22.

The 2019 College Nationals is the 24th Men's and Women's College Nationals. The College Nationals is a team handball tournament to determined the College National Champion from 2019 from the US.

== Final ranking ==
=== Men's ranking ===
Rank	Team
1st place, gold medalist(s)	West Point Black (1)
2nd place, silver medalist(s)	University of North Carolina (2)
3rd place, bronze medalist(s)	Air Force Academy (5)
4	Texas A&M University (NV)
5	West Point Gold (NR)
6	University of Virginia (NR)
7	Ohio State University (3)

=== Women's ranking ===
Rank	Team
1st place, gold medalist(s)	West Point Black
2nd place, silver medalist(s)	University of North Carolina
3rd place, bronze medalist(s)	Pennsylvania State University
4	West Point Gold
