= 2003 USA Team Handball College Nationals =

2003 College Nationals
- Logo of the 2003 College Nationals
- Season: 2002-03
- Dates: 28–30 March 2003
- Champion: Men's: West Point Black; Women's: West Point Black
- All statistics correct as of 2018-04-29.

The 2003 College Nationals was the 8th Men's and Women's College Nationals. The College Nationals was a team handball tournament to determined the College National Champion from 2003 from the US.

== Final ranking ==
=== Men's ranking ===
Rank	Team
1st place, gold medalist(s)	West Point Black
2nd place, silver medalist(s)	West Point Gold
3rd place, bronze medalist(s)	University of North Carolina
4	University of Alabama
5	Benedict College
6	Georgia State University
7	University of Minnesota
8	University of Memphis
9	Purdue University

=== Women's ranking ===
Rank	Team
1st place, gold medalist(s)	West Point Black
2nd place, silver medalist(s)	Furman University
3rd place, bronze medalist(s)	Virginia Commonwealth University
4	University of North Carolina
5	West Point Gold
