= 2009 USA Team Handball College Nationals =

2009 College Nationals
- Season: 2008-09
- Champion: Men's: West Point Black; Women's: University of North Carolina
- All statistics correct as of 2019-05-20.

The 2009 College Nationals was the 14th Men's and Women's College Nationals. The College Nationals was a team handball tournament to determined the College National Champion from 2009 from the US.

== Final ranking ==
=== Men's ranking ===
Rank	Team
1st place, gold medalist(s)	West Point Black
2nd place, silver medalist(s)	University of North Carolina
3rd place, bronze medalist(s)	Air Force Academy Blue
4	West Point Gold
5	USA College Select Team
6	Air Force Academy White

=== Women's ranking ===
Rank	Team
1st place, gold medalist(s)	University of North Carolina
2nd place, silver medalist(s)	West Point
3rd place, bronze medalist(s)	USA College Select Team
