= Below the zone =

Below the zone (BTZ) is a competitive early promotion program offered to enlisted U.S. Air Force personnel in the grade of Airman First Class/E-3. This early promotion opportunity is restricted to exceptional Airmen who stand out from their peers and perform duties at a level above their current rank. Selection opportunity is 15 percent of the total time-in-grade (TIG) and time-in-service (TIS) eligible population. Airmen selected for BTZ are nominated by their chain of command, and then usually appear before a board of judges, a board generally composed of their base's senior leadership (depending on unit size.) A "package", reviewed by the panel of judges, is also constructed for each competing Airman listing in bulleted format his/her major accomplishments and attributes. Upon selection for promotion, the Airmen will then receive a date upon which their newly assigned rank of Senior Airman will take effect. The effective date of promotion is six months earlier than the normal promotion date, hence "below the (promotion) zone".
