= Robert Beckel =

Robert Beckel could refer to:

- Robert D. Beckel (1937-2025), United States Air Force general
- Bob Beckel (1948–2022), American political analyst
