= USA Team Handball College Nationals – Women's Division =

Team handball tournament

Women's College Nationals
Tournament information
- Sport: Handball
- Month played: March–April
- Established: 1975 (as Nationals); 1996 (as College Nationals)
- Format: Round Robin, Knockout Stage

Current champion
- West Point

The Women's College National is a team handball tournament to determine the College National Champion from the US.

== History ==
The best college team from the Women's National was claimed as collegiate champion from 1975 until 1996. After the Olympic Games in 1996 in Atlanta the College Nationals were founded.

Record champion is the West Point with at minimum 25 titles. The college has also the most continuous titles with six from 2012 through 2017.

== Results ==
Year	Final			3rd place match			Teams
Year	Champions	Score	Runners-up	3rd place	Score	4th place	Teams
First tournament:1975 Ohio State University, Ohio	Kansas State University	Championship serie: 3-1-0 (8-8), (5-4), (10-8), (9-8)	Ohio State University	—	—	—	2
1976; Ohio State University, Ohio	Kansas State University		Slippery Rock University of Pennsylvania	Ohio State University	—	—	3 + 1 none College: East Coast HC
1977; Milwaukee, Wisconsin							
1978; Hofstra University, New York	Ohio State University		West Point	—	—	—	2 + 3 none College: New York THC, Miller Port HC & a country mixed team
1979							
1980; Colorado Springs, Colorado	West Point	11-10	Air Force Academy				
1981							
1982; Colorado Springs, Colorado	West Point						
1983; Washington, D.C.							
1984							
1985	California State University, Fullerton						
1986; Ohio State University, Ohio							
1987	University of Minnesota						
1988	Air Force Academy						
1989	West Point						
1990	West Point						
1991	West Point						
1992	Slippery Rock University of Pennsylvania						
1993; Philadelphia, Pennsylvania							
1994							
1995							
↓ College Nationals ↓
1996	West Point						
1997	Slippery Rock University of Pennsylvania	22-12	West Point Black				
1998							
1999; Emory University, Atlanta	West Point						
2000; University of North Carolina, Chapel Hill	West Point Black		Furman University	West Point Gold	—	—	3
2001; Atlanta	West Point Gold		Lander University	Middle Georgia State University	—	—	3
2002; Furman University, Greenville	West Point Black		University of North Carolina	West Point Gold	—	—	3
2003; Furman University, Greenville	West Point Black	11-10	Furman University	Virginia Commonwealth University	10-3	University of North Carolina	5
2004; University of North Carolina, Chapel Hill	University of North Carolina	10-6	Furman University	West Point Gold	26-7	Benedict College	5 + 1 none College
2005; Columbia	West Point	+1 Goal	Benedict College	Furman University		University of North Carolina	4
2006	West Point Black		University of North Carolina	West Point Gold		Benedict College	5
2007	West Point Black						
2008; United States Military Academy, West Point	Cortland State	12-11	University of North Carolina	Furman University		West Point Black	
2009; Weinstein Center, University of Richmond	University of North Carolina	8-6	West Point	USA College Select Team	—	—	3, one retirement
2010; Myrtle Beach, South Carolina	University of North Carolina	15-12	West Point Black	West Point Gold	9-7	Tar Heels	4
2011; United States Air Force Academy, Air Force Academy, Colorado	University of North Carolina	+1 Goals	West Point Black	Dynamo HC	31-11	West Point Gold	4
2012; Richmond, Virginia	West Point Black	14-13	University of North Carolina	West Point Gold		Boston HC	Ocean City High School 5th 5
2013; University of North Carolina, Chapel Hill	West Point Black						
2014; Auburn University, Auburn	West Point Black	19-4	University of North Carolina	—	—	—	2
2015; Auburn University, Auburn	West Point Black	18-4	University of North Carolina	West Point Gold	—	—	3 + USA Women's Residency
2016; University of North Carolina, Chapel Hill	West Point Black	21-13	University of North Carolina	West Point Gold	—	—	3 + a mix team
2017; University of North Carolina, Chapel Hill	West Point Black	15-12	University of North Carolina	West Point Gold			min. 3
2018; United States Military Academy, West Point	Pennsylvania State University	10-9	West Point Black	University of North Carolina		West Point Gold	4
2019; University of North Carolina, Chapel Hill	West Point Black	19-14	University of North Carolina	Pennsylvania State University	15-9	West Point Gold	4
2020; Ohio State University, Ohio	Cancelled due to COVID-19			Cancelled due to COVID-19			
2021	Cancelled due to COVID-19			Cancelled due to COVID-19			
2022; University of North Carolina, Chapel Hill	West Point Black	16-15	West Point Gold	University of North Carolina	17-16	Ohio State University	4
2023; Tiffin University, Tiffin	West Point Black	34-29	University of North Carolina	Ohio State University	18-12	West Point Gold	4
2024; University of North Carolina, Chapel Hill	West Point Black	25-9	University of North Carolina	West Point Gold	16-14	Ohio State University	5
2025; James Madison University, Harrisonburg	University of North Carolina	17-16	West Point Black	Ohio State University	21-16	West Point Gold	4
2026; NC State University, Raleigh	West Point Black	38-8	West Point Gold	Ohio State University	17-16	University of North Carolina	4

== Medal count ==
Rank	College	Gold	Silver	Bronze	Total
1	West Point	25	9	10	44
2	University of North Carolina	5	11	2	18
3	Slippery Rock University of Pennsylvania	2	1	0	3
4	Kansas State University	2	0	0	2
5	Ohio State University	1	1	4	6
6	United States Air Force Academy	1	1	0	2
7	Pennsylvania State University	1	0	1	2
8	California State University, Fullerton	1	0	0	1
8	Cortland State	1	0	0	1
8	University of Minnesota	1	0	0	1
11	Furman University	0	3	2	5
12	Benedict College	0	1	0	1
12	Lander University	0	1	0	1
14	Middle Georgia State University	0	0	1	1
14	Virginia Commonwealth University	0	0	1	1
Totals (15 entries)		40	28	21	89
