= Leatherneck Bowl =

- Stadium: Balboa Stadium
- Location: San Diego
- Operated: 1958–1964

The Leatherneck Bowl was an annual American football bowl game held in San Diego. Originally contested between Marine Corps Recruit Depot San Diego and another top military service football team, it became an annual matchup between San Diego and Naval Air Station Pensacola in 1961.

== History ==
The inaugural Leatherneck Bowl took place at Balboa Stadium on December 14, 1958, between the Marine Corps Recruit Depot San Diego Devil Dogs and Camp Lejeune. The game was open to the public and proceeds were donated to the Navy-Marine Corps Relief Society. An estimated 15,000 to 20,000 attendees, including 7,000 Navy and Marine recruits, watched San Diego beat Camp Lejeune 62–22. Halfback Billy Martin led the scoring for San Diego with three touchdowns (two rushing and one on a pass from Vern Valdez) and fullback Kenny Lutterbach scored two more.

The second Leatherneck Bowl was held on December 6, 1959 and benefited the San Diego County United Fund, Navy-Marine Corps Relief Society, and the Air Force Aid Society. 19,000 spectators saw San Diego beat Bolling Air Force Base 41–14. Alvin Hall was the game's leading scorer with three touchdowns and Billy Martin added two more.

The 1960 game saw the top West Coast service team (San Diego) play the best team from the East, the Quantico Marines Devil Dogs. Quantico won 36–6. King Dixon was the game's most valuable player, scoring three rushing touchdowns and one receiving touchdown on a pass from Tom Maudlin.

In 1961, Naval Air Station Pensacola, quarterbacked by former Navy All-American Joe Tranchini, defeated San Diego 21–15 in front of 25,102 fans. The teams faced off again in 1962 and San Diego won the rematch 16–7. 28,000 fans turned out to watch the rubber match in 1963. San Diego won the game 44–7, led by Hugh Oldham's three touchdowns. The final Leatherneck Bowl took place on November 22, 1964. 18,577 fans turned out to see San Diego beat Pensacola 15–6.

== All-time scores ==
Date played	Winning team		Losing team	
December 14, 1958	San Diego Marines	62	Camp Lejeune	22
December 6, 1959	San Diego Marines	41	Bolling AFB	14
December 11, 1960	Quantico Marines	36	San Diego Marines	6
November 22, 1961	NAS Pensacola	21	San Diego Marines	15
November 3, 1962	San Diego Marines	16	NAS Pensacola	7
November 17, 1963	San Diego Marines	44	NAS Pensacola	7
November 22, 1964	San Diego Marines	15	NAS Pensacola	6
