= King Dixon =

American football player, military officer, and college athletic director (1936–2020)

Biographical details
- Born: December 28, 1936; Laurens, South Carolina, U.S.
- Died: July 6, 2020 (aged 89); Laurens, South Carolina, U.S.

Playing career

Football
- 1956–1958: South Carolina
- 1959–1960: Quantico Marines
- 1962: San Diego Marines

Coaching career (HC unless noted)

Football
- 1961: Camp Hansen
- 1962–1963: San Diego Marines (assistant)
- 1964: San Diego Marines
- 1968: Quantico Marines

Administrative career (AD unless noted)
- 1988–1992: South Carolina

Head coaching record
- Overall: 23–9

Accomplishments and honors

Awards
- As player Second-team all ACC (1957); United States Armed Forces Athlete of the Year (1959)
- Military career
- Allegiance: United States of America
- Branch: United States Marine Corps
- Service years: 1959–1981
- Rank: Lieutenant Colonel
- Unit: 1st Reconnaissance Battalion
- Awards: Bronze Star Medal; Navy Commendation Medal with Combat V Vietnamese Gallantry Cross

Albert King Dixon Jr. (December 28, 1936 – July 6, 2020) was an American football player and athletic director for the South Carolina Gamecocks as well as a United States Marine Corps officer during the Vietnam War.

== University of South Carolina ==
Dixon was highly recruited out of Laurens High School. He was co-captain of the South Carolina team in the 1954 Shrine Bowl of the Carolinas and was named the game's most valuable player. He committed to the University of South Carolina and, after a stellar year on the freshman team, cracked the varsity starting lineup as a sophomore and helped lead the 1956 South Carolina Gamecocks football team to a 7–3 record. The following season, he scored two touchdowns in the Gamecocks upset 27–21 over #20 Texas. His 98-yard kickoff return for a touchdown on the game's opening play was an Atlantic Coast Conference record. An injury kept him out of the final three games of the season. He was named co–captain of the 1958 South Carolina Gamecocks football team and helped lead them to an upset over Duke and a 26–6 victory over rival Clemson in the Big Thursday game. In addition to playing running back, Dixon also played on defense and was the Gamecocks' punter and returner. In his three varsity seasons, Dixon gained 1,250 rushing yards, completed 15 of 34 passes, had 20 receptions, averaged 32.5 yards on 58 punts, intercepted seven passes, and scored 14 touchdowns. He was co-captain of the South team in the 1958 North–South Shrine Game.

While attending the University of South Carolina, Dixon was a member of the United States Marine Corps Reserve and spent three years as a page in the South Carolina House of Representatives. In 1958, he was a candidate for the House of Representatives in Laurens County, but lost by eight votes. He graduated in 1959 with a degree in political science.

== United States Marine Corps ==
Dixon entered the United States Marine Corps after graduation. He was co-captain of the 1959 Quantico Marines Devil Dogs football team that went 10–0 in the regular season and beat McClellan Air Force Base 90–0 in the Shrimp Bowl. Dixon averaged 7.5 yards per carry on the year and scored 52 points. He was selected by the DC Touchdown Club as the United States Armed Forces Athlete of the Year for 1959. In 1960, he carried the ball 58 times for 7.4 yards and caught 14 passes for 160 yards. He scored six touchdowns and had four conversions during the regular season. He scored two touchdowns against Naval Air Station Pensacola in the Missile Bowl, one of which came on a 95-yard kickoff return. In the Leatherneck Bowl, Dixon scored four touchdowns and passed for a two-point conversion. He finished the game with 76 yards rushing on 11 carries and 4 receptions for 81 yards.

In 1961, Dixon turned to coaching and led the Camp Hansen Strikers to a Far East championship. In 1962 and 1963, he was an assistant coach for the Marine Corps Recruit Depot San Diego team. He took over as head coach in 1964 and led the team to an 11–1 record.

In 1965, Dixon was assigned to the United States Army Infantry School at Fort Benning. He was then sent to Vietnam, where he was commanding officer of "B" Company, 1st Reconnaissance Battalion, and later, the 1st Force Company. He was awarded the Bronze Star Medal, Navy Commendation Medal with Combat V, and the Vietnamese Gallantry Cross for his service during the Vietnam War. He returned to Marine Corps Base Quantico in 1967 as a patrolling and counterinsurgency instructor at The Basic School and was coach of the base's football team in 1968.

== Return to Gamecocks ==
After retiring from the Marine Corps, Dixon returned to Laurens, South Carolina. From 1981 to 1983, he was executive director of the Laurens Family YMCA. He then served as vice president and city executive of Laurens for the Palmetto Bank. In 1988, he returned to the University of South Carolina as associate vice president for alumni affairs.

On October 3, 1988, Dixon was named USC's interim director of athletics after Dick Bestwick resigned due to health issues. Dixon was the fourth person to hold the job that year (Bob Marcum was fired in March due to a drug-testing controversy and Johnny Gregory served as acting AD until Bestwick was hired in April). He was named South Carolina's permanent athletic director on October 27.

Shortly after taking the job, Dixon had to deal with the University of South Carolina steroid scandal, which came about after Sports Illustrated published a lengthy article written by former South Carolina football player Tommy Chaikin in collaboration with SI's Rick Telander alleging widespread use of steroids in the school's football program. Following the article, a federal grand jury indicted four University of South Carolina football coaches in connection with steroid distribution to players. Three of the coaches pleaded guilty in plea-bargain arrangements and the fourth was acquitted. That offseason, the football program was dealt another blow after head coach Joe Morrison died of a heart attack. Appalachian State head coach Sparky Woods was chosen to succeed Morrison. South Carolina started 1989 season 5–1–1 and ranked No. 25 in the country. However, in the eighth game against No. 20 NC State, senior star quarterback Todd Ellis, considered arguably the most impactful player in program history until then, suffered a college career-ending injury. The Gamecocks subsequently lost three of their last four games. They finished the following season with a record of 6–5. The Gamecocks were considered for the Independence Bowl both seasons, but Dixon declined the opportunity to play in the game, citing a conflict with the fall semester exams.

In 1990, South Carolina accepted an invitation to join the Southeastern Conference. They entered the conference in all sports but football on July 1, 1991 and played their first season of SEC football in 1992.

In 1991, Dixon fired men's basketball coach George Felton, who had a 87–62 record in his five seasons as head coach (including an appearance in the 1989 NCAA Division I men's basketball tournament) and had just led South Carolina to its first 20-win season in eight years and an appearance in the National Invitation Tournament. South Carolina offered the job to Rutgers head coach and former Gamecocks assistant Bob Wenzel, but he turned down the offer. The school instead hired Steve Newton, who compiled a 20–35 record in his two seasons as head coach.

USC lost the final four games of the 1991 season and the first five of 1992, giving them the longest losing streak in NCAA Division I-A. Dixon was booed during a halftime ceremony in South Carolina's 49–7 loss Arkansas and after a loss to Alabama the following week, the team voted to request head coach Sparky Woods' resignation. On October 19, 1992, university president John Palms announced that Dixon would be reassigned following the appointment of a successor, stating that it was the "appropriate time to ... seek a different athletic director (because) ... of where we are in athletics". On November 30, Palms announced that University of Southern California athletic director Mike McGee would take over in January 1993.

== Later life ==
After his dismissal, Dixon returned to Laurens, where he worked in the private sector and was involved in community service and philanthropy. On December 31, 2019, he was appointed by Governor Henry McMaster to fill a vacant seat on the University of South Carolina Board of Trustees. Dixon died from pancreatic cancer on July 6, 2020.
