= Billy Martin (halfback) =

American football player (1938–1976)

No. 22, 16, 28
- Position: Halfback

Personal information
- Born: June 6, 1938; Chicago, Illinois, U.S.
- Died: November 10, 1976 (aged 38)
- Listed height: 5 ft 11 in (1.80 m)
- Listed weight: 197 lb (89 kg)

Career information
- High school: Wendell Phillips (IL)
- College: Minnesota
- NFL draft: 1960: 4th round, 43rd overall pick
- AFL draft: 1961: 30th round, 236th overall pick

Career history
- Chicago Bears (1962–1964); Edmonton Eskimos (1965); Winnipeg Blue Bombers (1966); Toronto Argonauts (1966)

Awards and highlights
- NFL champion (1963)

Career NFL statistics
- Rushing yards: 28
- Rushing average: 3.1
- Receptions: 2
- Receiving yards: 17
- Total touchdowns: 1
- Stats at Pro Football Reference

William Vance Martin (June 6, 1938 – November 10, 1976) was a professional American football halfback in the National Football League (NFL).

== College career ==
Martin played college football for the University of Minnesota. After graduating he joined the United States Marines Corps and played for the Marine Corps Recruit Depot San Diego Devil Dogs in 1958 and 1959, helping the team to two Leatherneck Bowl victories.

== Professional career ==
He was selected by the Chicago Bears in the fourth round of the 1960 NFL draft. He played three seasons for the Bears from 1962 to 1964.
