= Dana Pounds =

American javelin thrower

Sport
- Country: United States
- Sport: Track and field
- Event: Javelin throw

Dana Pounds is an American track and field athlete competing in the javelin throw. In 2007, she competed in the women's javelin throw event at the 2007 World Championships in Athletics held in Osaka, Japan. She did not qualify to compete in the final.

Competing for the Air Force Falcons track and field team, she won the women's javelin throw event at the NCAA Division I Outdoor Track and Field Championships both in 2005 and in 2006.

In 2008, she won the women's United States Air Force Athlete of the Year award.

== Personal life ==
In December 2013, her husband David Lyon was killed by a car bomb in Afghanistan.
