= Kathy Callaghan =

American handball player

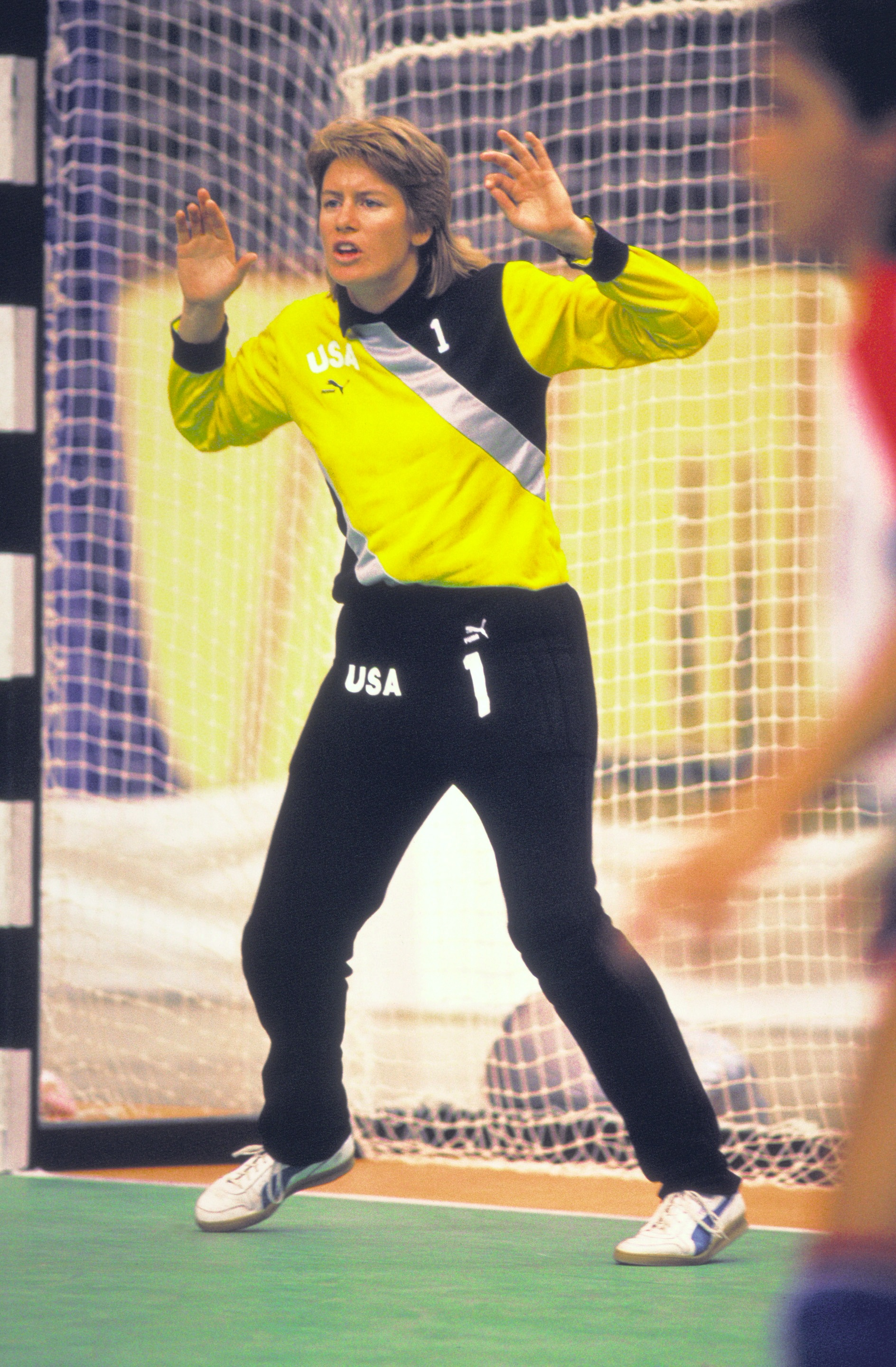
- Kathy Callaghan in the goal at the 1987 Pan American Games

Personal information
- Full name: Kathleen Alice Callaghan
- Nationality: United States
- Born: March 24, 1962 (age 64) Berkeley, California
- Height: 175 cm (5 ft 9 in)

Sport
- Sport: Handball
- Position: Goalkeeper

Youth career
- Years: Team
- -1984: USAFA Team Handball
National team
- Years: Team
- –: United States

Teams managed
- –: USAFA Team Handball
Medal record
Pan American Games
Gold medal – first place	1987 Indianapolis
- Military career
- Allegiance: United States
- Branch: United States Air Force
- Rank: First lieutenant

Kathleen Alice Callaghan (born March 24, 1962) is an American former handball player. She was a member of the United States women's national handball team that played in the Women's tournament at the 1988 Summer Olympics. She coached the women's USAFA Team Handball team and won the 1988 College Nationals title.

== Honors ==
- 1986 United States Armed Forces Athlete of the Year

== See also ==
- USAFA Team Handball
