= Kelly Curtis (skeleton racer) =

American skeleton racer (born 1989)

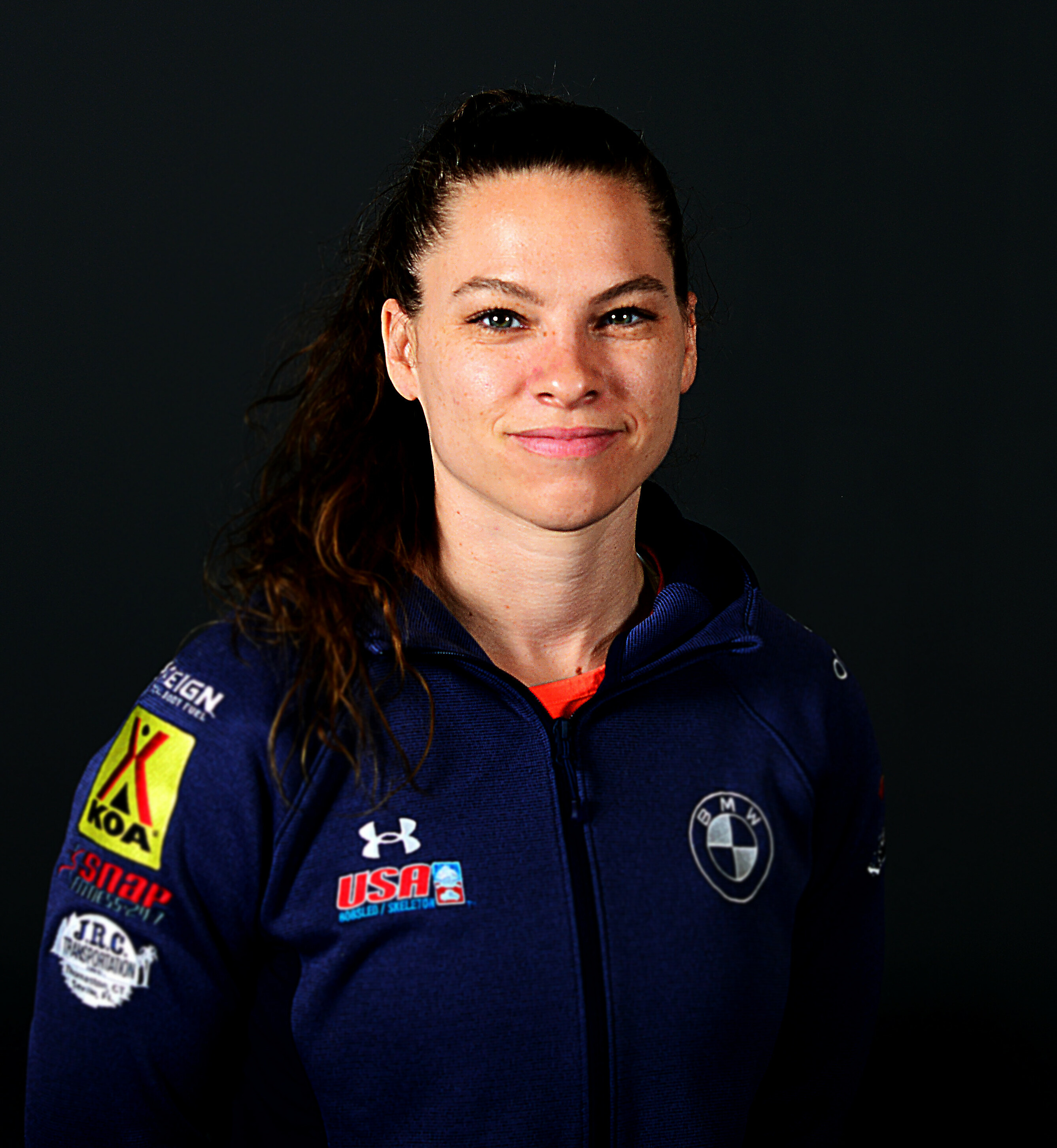
- Curtis in 2022

Personal information
- Born: January 25, 1989 (age 37) Princeton, New Jersey, U.S.
- Education: Tulane University; Springfield College; St. Lawrence University
- Height: 1.76 m (5 ft 9 in)

Sport
- Country: United States
- Sport: Skeleton
- Military career
- Allegiance: United States
- Branch: U.S. Air Force
- Rank: Staff sergeant

Kelly Curtis (born January 25, 1989) is an American skeleton racer who competed at the 2022 Winter Olympics and 2026 Winter Olympics in the skeleton. At the 2022 games in Beijing, she became the first Black woman to represent the United States in the sport at the Olympics.

== Early life and education ==
Raised in an athletic family in Princeton, New Jersey, her father had played football at Springfield College and was selected by the New York Jets in the 1971 NFL draft, while her siblings include one brother who wrestled at Princeton University and another who played football at both Springfield College and Princeton University. Curtis graduated from Princeton High School in 2007, where she competed in basketball, as well as in prep track and field in the long jump, rising in the sport to compete in the sport at the state's Meet of Champions.

After a postgraduate year at the Lawrenceville School she attended Tulane University before transferring after two years at the school. Enrolling as a student at Springfield College in her junior year, she competed in the heptathlon, winning the event at the 2011 Penn Relays, winning the New England Division III Indoor Championship in the heptathlon both years at Springfield and finished fifth as a senior at the NCAA championships. At St. Lawrence University, she earned a master's in educational leadership and was an assistant track coach.

== Sports career ==
While still a college student at Springfield, a strength and conditioning coach suggested that she had the requisite skills and should try out at a combine run by the United States Bobsled and Skeleton Federation for prospective participants. Her coaches thought that she had skills similar to Erin Pac, a former Springfield heptathlete who won a bronze medal in two-woman bobsled at the 2010 Winter Olympics.

She had first intended to compete in the bobsled, but decided to switch over to skeleton in 2013 after seeing how the race was run face forward down the ice track at speeds as high as 90 miles per hour (140 km/h). Curtis enlisted in the United States Air Force in 2020, competing as part of the Air Force's World Class Athlete Program. Based in Aviano Air Base in Italy, she serves with the 31st Communications Squadron as a knowledge management technician; the location about 90 miles (140 km) from Cortina d'Ampezzo has allowed her to train at tracks in the area and at venues throughout Europe.

At the 2022 Winter Olympics in Beijing, she competed in the women's skeleton held at the Yanqing National Sliding Centre, finishing in the 21st spot; her teammate Katie Uhlaender finished sixth. She became the first Black athlete to compete on behalf of the United States in skeleton in any Olympic Games.

At the 2026 Winter Olympics, Curtis finished 12th in the women's skeleton competition held at the Cortina Sliding Centre in Cortina d'Ampezzo; her American teammate Mystique Ro finished 15th.

=== Olympic Games ===
Year	Age	Women	Skeleton mixed team
(China) 2022 Beijing	33	21st	—N/a
(Italy) 2026 Milano Cortina	37	12th	10th
