= Hugh Oldham (Canadian football) =

American gridiron football player (1943–2008)

Profile
- Position: Wide receiver

Personal information
- Born: March 18, 1943; Caldwell, Texas, U.S.
- Died: July 25, 2008 (aged 65); Rancho Cordova, California, U.S.
- Listed height: 5 ft 10 in (1.78 m)
- Listed weight: 175 lb (79 kg)

Career information
- College: Oregon

Career history
- 1970–1974: Ottawa Rough Riders

Awards and highlights
- Grey Cup champion (1973)

Hugh Oldham (March 18, 1943 – July 25, 2008) was an American professional football player who played for the Ottawa Rough Riders. He played college football at the University of Oregon and was a member of the Marine Corps Recruit Depot San Diego Devil Dogs prior to turning professional. He scored three touchdowns for San Diego in the 1963 Leatherneck Bowl.
