= 1976 USA Team Handball Nationals =

11th annual U.S.A. handball nationals

- Season: 1975-76
- Dates: 7 - 9. Mai 1976
- Champion: Men's Open: Swim & Sport Club of Flanders; Men's Collegiate: West Point; Women's Open: East Coast HC; Women's Collegiate: Kansas Merchants
- All statistics correct as of 2018-05-19.

The 1976 Nationals was the 11th Men's and second Women's Nationals. The Nationals was a team handball tournament to determine the National Champion from 1976 from the US.

== Final ranking ==
=== Men's Open ranking ===
Rank	Team
1st place, gold medalist(s)	Swim & Sport Club of Flanders
2nd place, silver medalist(s)	Air Force Academy^{1}
3rd place, bronze medalist(s)	Northwest Suburban Chicago YMCA
4	United States Army
5	Atlanta
6	East Ridge
7	West Point
8	University of California, Los Angeles
9	Ohio State University (university)
10	Ohio State University (open)

=== Men's Collegiate ranking ===
Rank	Team
1st place, gold medalist(s)	West Point
2nd place, silver medalist(s)	Air Force Academy^{1}
3rd place, bronze medalist(s)	University of California, Los Angeles
4	Ohio State University

^{1} Air Force was represented by the men's varsity basketball team.

=== Women's ranking ===
==== Women's Open ranking ====
Rank	Team
1st place, gold medalist(s)	East Coast HC
2nd place, silver medalist(s)	Kansas Merchants
3rd place, bronze medalist(s)	Slippery Rock University of Pennsylvania
4	Ohio State University

==== Women's Collegiate ranking ====
Rank	Team
1st place, gold medalist(s)	Kansas Merchants
2nd place, silver medalist(s)	Slippery Rock University of Pennsylvania
3rd place, bronze medalist(s)	Ohio State University

Best ranked Collegiate teams in the Women's Open Division
