= Ron Perry (athletic director) =

American college athete, coach and administrator (1932–2024)

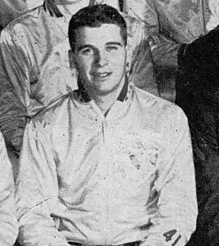
- Perry on the Marine Corps Base Quantico basketball team

Biographical details
- Born: May 22, 1932
- Died: October 25, 2024 (aged 92)
- Education: College of the Holy Cross

Playing career

Basketball
- 1951–1954: Holy Cross

Baseball
- 1952–1954: Holy Cross

Coaching career (HC unless noted)

Basketball
- 1959–1972: Catholic Memorial School

Baseball
- 1960–1972: Catholic Memorial School

Administrative career (AD unless noted)
- 1959–1972: Catholic Memorial School
- 1972–1998: Holy Cross

Head coaching record
- Overall: 292–34 (Basketball); 186–53 (Baseball)

Accomplishments and honors

Championships
- 1952 College World Series (as player); 1954 National Invitation Tournament (as player); 2x Massachusetts state basketball champion (as coach)

Awards
- 1957 United States Armed Forces Athlete of the Year

Ronald Stanley Perry (May 22, 1932 – October 25, 2024) was an American athlete, coach, and athletics administrator who served as athletic director at the College of the Holy Cross from 1972 to 1998.

== Athletic career ==
Perry was born on May 22, 1932. He was one of three sons born to Portuguese immigrants Manuel to Tiolinda Pereira, who Americanized their name to Perry. Perry a standout athlete at Somerville High School and is the school's all-time leading scorer in basketball. He led Somerville to a state championship his junior year and to the New England title game as a senior. He also led the school's baseball team to the state championship game his senior year.

Perry attended the College of the Holy Cross, where he pitched for the Holy Cross Crusaders baseball team and played point guard for the basketball team. As a sophomore, he helped lead Holy Cross to victory in the 1952 College World Series. As a senior he pitched a no-hitter against Harvard on his 22nd birthday. He finished with a career record of 23–2. As a junior, Perry was the second leading scorer on the Crusaders' basketball team (averaging 13.3 points per game) behind Togo Palazzi and helped lead Holy Cross to the Elite Eight in the 1953 NCAA basketball tournament. The following year he took a lesser scoring role in favor of Palazzi and newcomer Tom Heinsohn. As a senior, Perry averaged 12.6 points on a Holy Cross team that won the 1954 National Invitation Tournament.

Ron Perry on the 1955-56 basketball team at Marine Corps Schools, Quantico, Virginia

Perry was drafted in the 4th Round of the 1954 NBA draft by the Boston Celtics, but instead decided to sign with the Milwaukee Braves. However, his playing career was halted by a three-year stint in the United States Marine Corps. While in the Marines, he played on the Marine Corps Base Quantico team with future Basketball Hall of Famer Richie Guerin. In 1957 he was named the United States Armed Forces Athlete of the Year in both basketball and baseball.

He attended spring training with the Braves in 1958, but at 26 years old, decided it was too late to begin a baseball career and returned to Massachusetts to coach and officiate.

== Coaching ==
In 1959, Perry became the athletic director at Catholic Memorial School and established the school's basketball and baseball programs. He led the basketball team to a 292–34 record, including two state basketball titles, five Tech tournament championships, and ten consecutive Catholic Conference championships. He also coached the baseball team to a 186–53 record. Perry was offered the position of director of recreation for the city of Boston in 1971, but turned it down to remain at Catholic Memorial.

== Athletic director ==
On April 6, 1972, Perry was named athletic director at Holy Cross. As AD, Perry oversaw the construction of the school's $2.5 million athletic complex, which included the Hart Center, a renovation of Fitton Field, the construction of a new track and field facility, and the development of a $1.5 million wellness center. He also saw the school expand from 9 varsity sports to 25, including the addition of women's teams after the school went co-ed. In 1979, Holy Cross was asked to become a charter member of the Big East Conference, however school president John E. Brooks overruled Perry and rejected the invitation.

From 1976 to 1981, Perry's son, Ron Perry Jr., played baseball and basketball for the Crusaders. He set a then school-record by scoring 2,542 points for the Crusaders basketball team.

In 1985, all four of the black players on the Crusaders men's basketball team, including leading scorer Larry Westbrook and leading rebounder Walter Coates, walked out following a fight between a black player and a white player. Westbrook accused coach George Blaney of having a double standard when punishing black players and that the team's "environment is one where racist sentiment can grow and grow". Blaney decided not to invite two of the players, Larry Westbrook and Jim Runcie, back due to their conduct after the fight. One of the other two players, Walter Coates returned to the team after a short absence while Doug McCrory chose to transfer to another school.

In 1985 the school moved to the newly formed Colonial League (later known as the Patriot League), which prohibited its members from awarding athletic scholarships and did not allow its football teams to play in the NCAA Division I-AA Football Playoffs. The decision to join the Patriot League was made by school president Brooks without consulting Perry. Perry believed that recruiting without scholarships along with the school's school's high admission standards made it hard to bring top athletes to Holy Cross. Holy Cross struggled in the Patriot League, finishing near the bottom most years in the standings for the Presidents' Cup. In 1987, Holy Cross ended its annual football game with rival Boston College in order to focus on Division 1-AA competition. According to Perry, the decision was inevitable because the school's administrators felt that Holy Cross could no longer compete with Boston College. Due to pressure from Perry and Holy Cross, the Patriot League opted to make athletic scholarships optional in men's and women's basketball beginning in 1998.

On February 2, 1986, head football coach Rick Carter committed suicide. His father had died of cancer the previous August and his mother was terminally ill but friends claimed he was also upset about his lack of career advancement. In previous years Carter had been offered jobs at several major programs, but Holy Cross would not release him from his contract and those offers had stopped coming. Perry promoted assistant Mark Duffner to head coach 6 days after Carter's death. Duffner compiled a 60-5-1 record over the next six seasons before leaving Holy Cross for Maryland.

== Retirement and death ==
Perry retired on July 1, 1998, but remained involved with the school as an adviser to the president. He spent much of his retirement caring for his wife, who suffered a stroke in 1994 and required near constant care since the early 2000s. Patricia Perry died on April 21, 2015. Perry died on October 25, 2024, at the age of 92.
