= Air Force Falcons men's basketball =

College men's basketball team representing the United States Air Force Academy

Air Force Falcons
2026–27 Air Force Falcons men's basketball team
- Institution: United States Air Force Academy
- Head coach: Joe Crispin (1st season)
- Location: Air Force Academy, Colorado
- Arena: Clune Arena (capacity: 5,939)
- Conference: Mountain West
- Nickname: Falcons
- Colors: Blue and silver

NCAA Division I tournament appearances
- 1960, 1962, 2004, 2006

Conference regular-season champions
- Mountain West; 2004

Uniforms
Home	Away	Alternate

The Air Force Falcons men's basketball team represents the United States Air Force Academy, located in Air Force Academy, Colorado, in NCAA Division I basketball competition. They play their home games at Clune Arena and are members of the Mountain West Conference. The Falcons are coached by Joe Crispin. Air Force has appeared in the NCAA tournament four times, most recently in 2006.

== Postseason ==
=== NCAA tournament results ===
The Falcons have appeared in the NCAA tournament four times. Their record is 0–4.

Year	Seed	Round	Opponent	Result/Score
1960		First Round	DePaul	L 63–69
1962		First Round	Texas Tech	L 66–68
2004	#11	First Round	#6 North Carolina	L 52–63
2006	#13	First Round	#4 Illinois	L 69–78

=== NIT results ===
The Falcons have appeared in one National Invitation Tournament, with a record of 3–1.

Year	Round	Opponent	Result/Score
2007	First Round; Second Round; Quarterfinals; Semifinals	Austin Peay; Georgia; DePaul; Clemson	W 75–51; W 83–52; W 52–51; L 67–68

=== CIT results ===
The Falcons have appeared in two CollegeInsider.com Tournaments, with a combined record of 2–2.

Year	Round	Opponent	Result/Score
2011	First Round; Second Round	North Dakota; Santa Clara	W 77–67; L 75–88
2013	First Round; Second Round	Hawaiʻi; Weber State	W 69–65; L 57–78

== Notable former players ==
Notable alumni include:

- Jared Dillinger: Former PBA Player (2008-23)
- Gregg Popovich: Current San Antonio Spurs President
- Rodney Tention: Former coach at Loyola Marymount (2005–08)
- Bob Djokovich & Thomas Schneeberger: founder of the USAFA Team Handball and Olympians.

== Trivia ==
The team attended the 1976 USA Team Handball Nationals and became second in the adults and collegiate division.

After the nationals Bob Djokovich and Thomas Schneeberger founded USAFA Team Handball.
