= USA Team Handball College Nationals – Men's Division =

Sports team

Men's College Nationals
Tournament information
- Sport: Handball
- Month played: March – April
- Established: 1996
- Format: Round Robin, Knockout Stage
- Teams: 4 – 13

Current champion
- West Point

The Men's College National is a team handball tournament to determine the College National Champion from the US.

== History ==
The best college team from the Men's National was claimed as College champion until 1996. After the Olympic Games in 1996 in Atlanta the College Nationals were founded.

Record champion is the West Point with at minimum 40 titles the college has also the most continues titles with 18 from 2009 until now.

== Results ==
Year	Final			3rd place match			Teams
Year	Champions	Score	Runners-up	3rd place	Score	4th place	Teams
1970							
1971							
1972	Adelphi University						
1973							
1974; Monmouth University, New Jersey	Willamette University	15-10	Ohio State				
1975; Ohio State University, Ohio	Willamette University	18-11	UCLA				9 OSU A, OSU B, LHU
1976; Ohio State University, Ohio	West Point		Air Force Academy	UCLA		OSU	4
1977; Milwaukee, Wisconsin	Air Force Academy						OSU, West Point, UCLA
1978; Hofstra University, New York	Air Force Academy						OSU, West Point, Gettysburg College, A&M
1979; Colorado Springs, Colorado	West Point					University of Southern California	UCLA 7th + none College: Chi-Town Club, North West All Stars
1980; Colorado Springs, Colorado	West Point	16-14	Air Force Academy	University of Southern California			OSU + none College: West Coast All-stars, New Jersey Jets
1981	West Point						
1982; Colorado Springs, Colorado	West Point						
1983; Washington, D.C.	University of Southern California						total 12 teams with no College; OSU
1984; California State University, Fullerton							
1985	West Point						
1986; Ohio State University, Ohio	West Point						OSU, Air Force
1987	West Point						
1988	West Point						
1989	West Point					University of North Carolina	
1990	West Point						
1991; Oklahoma City, Oklahoma	West Point			University of North Carolina	17-16	Ohio State University	
1992; Philadelphia, Pennsylvania	West Point						11; UNC 8th
1993; Philadelphia, Pennsylvania	West Point						OSU, UNC
1994							UNC
1995	West Point						UNC
↓ College Nationals ↓
1996	West Point						UNC
1997	West Point Black	25-16	West Point Gold				UNC
1998; Columbia	West Point			University of North Carolina			PC
1999; Emory University, Atlanta	West Point	20-13	University of North Carolina	Air Force Academy			
2000; University of North Carolina, Chapel Hill	West Point Black	28-11	Air Force Academy	University of North Carolina		Georgia Southern University	11
2001; Atlanta	West Point Black	26-15	University of North Carolina	Middle Georgia State University		West Point Gold	9
2002; Furman University, Greenville	Air Force Academy		West Point Black	Middle Georgia State University		University of North Carolina	11
2003; Furman University, Greenville	West Point Black	20-19	West Point Gold	University of North Carolina	21-17	University of Alabama	9
2004; University of North Carolina, Chapel Hill	University of North Carolina	21-17	West Point Black	Air Force Academy	29-13	Tar Heel	9
2005; Columbia	University of North Carolina	16-13	West Point	Georgia State University		Benedict College	7
2006	University of North Carolina		West Point Black	Air Force Academy		West Point Gold	7
2007	West Point Black	20-15	University of North Carolina	Air Force Academy B	34-24	Air Force Academy A	5
2008; United States Military Academy, West Point	West Point Black	24-21	University of North Carolina	Air Force Academy		West Point Gold	
2009; United States Air Force Academy, Air Force Academy, Colorado	West Point Black	38-26	University of North Carolina	Air Force Academy		West Point Gold	
2010; Myrtle Beach, South Carolina	West Point Black	30-25	West Point Gold	University of North Carolina	34-14	Texas A&M University	7
2011; United States Air Force Academy, Air Force Academy, Colorado	West Point Black	40-28	West Point Gold	University of North Carolina	26-25	Air Force Academy A	6
2012; Richmond, Virginia	West Point Black	29-27 (OT)	West Point Gold	University of North Carolina	32-12	Texas A&M University	Merchant Marine Academy 5th ?
2013; University of North Carolina, Chapel Hill	West Point Black	34-19	West Point Gold	University of North Carolina		Tar Heels (UNC)	9
2014; Auburn University, Auburn	West Point Black	23-14	University of North Carolina	Air Force Academy	29-15	Clemson University	11
2015; Auburn University, Auburn	West Point Black	35-32	West Point Gold	University of North Carolina	20-13	Texas A&M University	12
2016; University of North Carolina, Chapel Hill	West Point Black	29-17	West Point Gold	Air Force Academy	28-22	University of North Carolina	13
2017; University of North Carolina, Chapel Hill	West Point Black	31-25	University of Virginia	Air Force Academy	29-22	Auburn University	11
2018; United States Military Academy, West Point	West Point Black	26-25	University of Virginia	West Point Gold		Air Force Academy	9
2019; University of North Carolina, Chapel Hill	West Point Black	29-24	University of North Carolina	Air Force Academy	34-32	Texas A&M University	7
2020; Ohio State University, Ohio	Cancelled due to COVID-19			Cancelled due to COVID-19			
2021	Cancelled due to COVID-19			Cancelled due to COVID-19			
2022 University of North Carolina, Chapel Hill	West Point Black	31-30	Ohio State University	University of North Carolina	31-25	Air Force Academy	10
2023; Tiffin University, Tiffin	West Point Black	34-29	University of North Carolina	Ohio State Scarlet	40-26	Air Force Academy	12
2024; University of North Carolina, Chapel Hill	West Point Black	23-20	University of North Carolina	West Point Gold	35-32	Air Force Academy	5
2025; James Madison University, Harrisonburg	West Point Black	29-27	University of North Carolina	West Point Gold	30-28	Air Force Academy	6
2026; NC State University, Raleigh	West Point Black	46-36	Air Force Academy	University of North Carolina	26-25	University of Pittsburgh	7

=== Division 2 ===
Year	Final			3rd place match			Teams
Year	Champions	Score	Runners-up	3rd place	Score	4th place	Teams
2024; University of North Carolina, Chapel Hill	University of Pittsburgh	34-23	James Madison University	San Jose State University	33-25	OSU Gray	10
2025; James Madison University, Harrisonburg	University of Kentucky	36-30	Case Western Reserve	James Madison University	34-30	Olin College	9
2026; NC State University, Raleigh	Case Western Reserve	21-19	University of North Carolina	Olin College	26-22	SUNY Cortland	

== Medal count ==
Rank	College	Gold	Silver	Bronze	Total
1	West Point	40	12	3	55
2	University of North Carolina	3	10	11	24
3	Air Force Academy	3	4	10	17
4	Willamette University	2	0	0	2
5	University of Southern California	1	0	1	2
6	Adelphi University	1	0	0	1
7	Ohio State University	0	2	1	3
8	University of Virginia	0	2	0	2
9	UCLA	0	1	1	2
10	Middle Georgia State University	0	0	2	2
11	Georgia State University	0	0	1	1
Totals (11 entries)		50	31	30	111
