= 1975 USA Team Handball Nationals – women's open division =

1975 USA Team Handball Nationals – Women's Open Division
- Season: 1974–75
- Dates: 24 – 25 May 1975
- Champion: Kansas State University
- Matches played: 4
- Goals scored: 60 (15 per match)
- All statistics correct as of 2022-03-07.

The 1975 Nationals was the first Women's Nationals. The Nationals was a team handball tournament to determine the National Champion from 1975 from the US.

== Venues ==
The championship was played at the Ohio State University in Columbus, Ohio.

Columbus	1975 USA Team Handball Nationals – women's open division is located in the United States
St. John Arena	1975 USA Team Handball Nationals – women's open division is located in the United States
Capacity: 13,276	1975 USA Team Handball Nationals – women's open division is located in the United States
Exterior view in 2014	1975 USA Team Handball Nationals – women's open division is located in the United States

== Modus ==
Location of 1975 USA Team Handball Nationals Women's Open Division Teams.

The two teams played a championship series with four games.

== Results ==
Team	Pld	W	D	L	GF	GA	GD	Pts
Kansas State University	4	3	1	0	32	28	+4	7
Ohio State University	4	0	1	3	28	32	−4	1

Kansas State	8-8	Ohio State	St. John Arena

Kansas State	5-4	Ohio State	St. John Arena

Kansas State	10-8	Ohio State	St. John Arena

Kansas State	9-8	Ohio State	St. John Arena

== Final ranking ==
=== Women's Open ranking ===
Rank	Team
1st place, gold medalist(s)	Kansas State University
2nd place, silver medalist(s)	Ohio State University

=== Women's College ranking ===
Rank	Team
1st place, gold medalist(s)	Kansas State University
2nd place, silver medalist(s)	Ohio State University
