= David DeGraaf =

American handball player

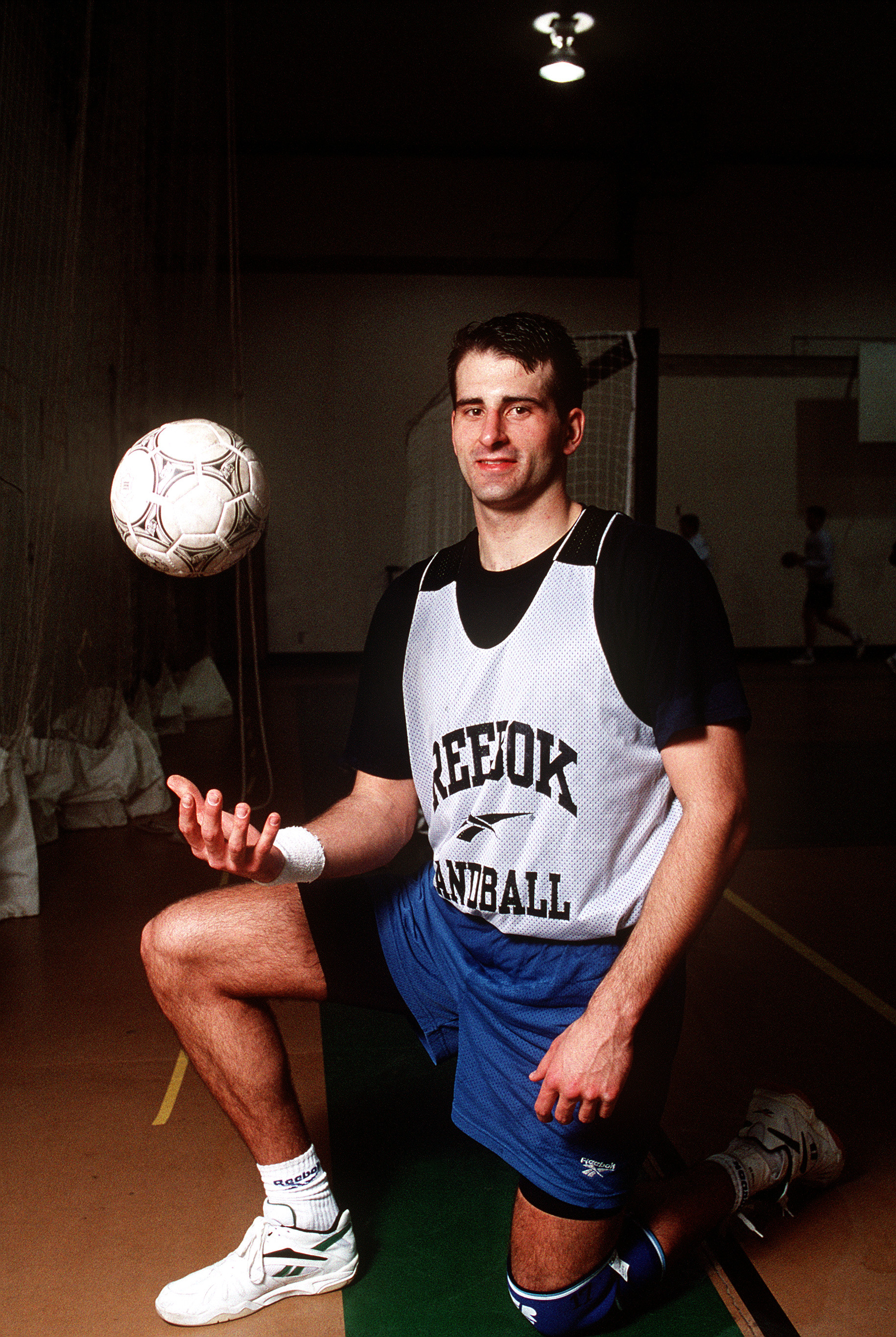
- David DeGraaf before the 1996 Summer Olympics

Personal information
- Full name: David Warren DeGraaf
- Born: March 26, 1971 (age 55) Spring Arbor, Michigan, United States
- Height: 203 cm (6 ft 8 in)

Sport
- Sport: Handball
- Current club: retired

Youth career
- Years: Team
- 1991–1993: USAFA Team Handball

Senior clubs
- Years: Team
- –: Knight Air
National team
- Years: Team
- –: United States men's national handball team
- Military career
- Allegiance: United States
- Branch: United States Air Force
- Service years: 1993-2014
- Rank: Major

David Warren DeGraaf (born March 26, 1971, in Spring Arbor, Michigan) is an American former handball player who competed in the 1996 Summer Olympics.

== Career ==
The United States Air Force Academy (Class of 1993) originally recruited him for football and basketball, but he ended up playing for the USAFA Team Handball.

He competed at the 1994 Goodwill Games (6th place out of 6), Pan American Games 1995 (4th of 6) & 1999 (4th of 7) and the 1996 Summer Olympics (9th of 12).

At the 1996 Summer Olympics he scored a record, 13 goals against Kuwait and a record of seven blocked shots. Only Niclas Ekberg was able to score 13 goals at the Olympic Games in 2012. DeGraaf also scored the game-winning goal against Algeria, in overtime, with no time remaining on the clock.

In 1997, he was selected as 1996 United States Air Force Athlete of the Year.

In 1998, he won the Nationals Championship with Knight Air and was the MVP of the tournament. DeGraaf has over 200 International Games and was awarded the USATHF Male Athlete of the year twice.

== Awards ==
	Air Force Achievement Medal
	Air Force Longevity Service Award
	Joint Service Commendation Medal
Level unknown	Marksmanship
	National Defense Service Medal
	Air Force Outstanding Unit Award
