= Bob Djokovich =

American handball player

6th President of the United States Team Handball Federation
- In office 2001–2004
- Preceded by: Dennis Berkholtz
- Succeeded by: Mike Hurdle

4th President of the USA Team Handball
- In office 5. February 2018 (Interim) – 2018 (Interim); 2018 – 13. August 2019
- Preceded by: Harvey Schiller
- Succeeded by: Michael J. Wall

Personal details
- Born: August 10, 1956 (age 70) Gary, Indiana, U.S.
- Education: United States Air Force Academy
- Handball career
- Full name: Robert Ray Djokovich
- Height: 190 cm (6 ft 3 in)
- Sport: Handball
- Current club: retired

Senior clubs
- Years: Team
- 1976–: Air Force Falcons
National team
| Years | Team | |
| 1977–1987 | United States men's national handball team | |
Title
| 6 times | Nationals | 1st |
- Basketball career

Career information
- High school: Lew Wallace (Gary, Indiana)
- College: Air Force (1974–1978)
- Position: Point guard
Medals
Men's Handball
Representing the United States
Pan American Games
| Gold medal – first place | 1987 Indianapolis | Team |
Goodwill Games
| Silver medal – second place | 1986 Moscow | Team |

Robert Ray Djokovich (born August 10, 1956) is an American former Basketball and Handball player who competed in the 1984 Summer Olympics in handball. He was the 6th President of the USA Team Handball. He was born in Gary, Indiana.

== Career ==
=== College player ===
Between 1977 and 1978 he was co-captain of the basketball team of the United States Air Force Academy which he played from 1974 to 1978.

In 1976 he and Thomas Schneeberger started a handball club at the USAFA and won the handball nationals six times.

=== National player ===
Between 1977 and 1987 he was a national player on the United States men's national handball team. At the Summer Olympics in 1984 was he team captain and scored 18 goals. His biggest victories were winning the gold medal at the Pan American Games in 1987 and a silver medal at the Goodwill Games in 1986.

=== USA Team Handball staff ===
He was the 6th president of the US Team Handball Federation between 2001 and 2004, while at the same time, he was a member of the United States Olympic Committee Board of Directors.
