= Kevin Eastler =

American race walker

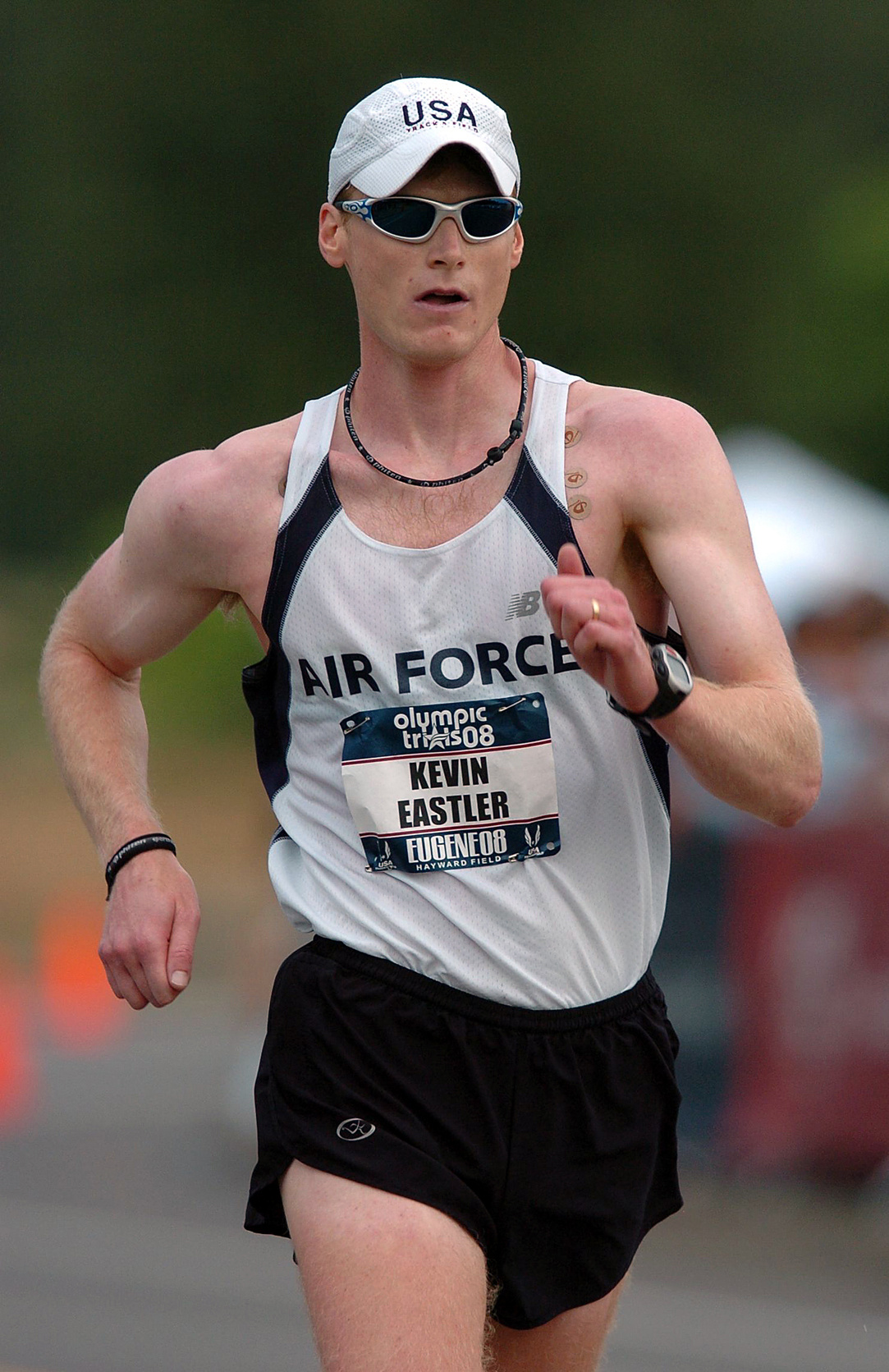
- Eastler in 2008

Personal information
- Born: October 14, 1977 (age 49) Farmington, Maine, U.S.
- Height: 6 ft 1 in (1.85 m)
- Weight: 170 lb (77 kg)

Sport
- Country: United States
- Sport: Athletics
- Event: Race walking
- Club: U.S. Air Force
- Coached by: Stephen Plaetzer

Achievements and titles
- Personal bests: 20 km walk: 1:22:25 (2003); 50 km walk: 4:05:44 (2007)

Kevin Eastler (born October 14, 1977) is an American race walker. He is a two-time Olympian (2004 & 2008) in 20-km, four-time U.S. 20-km race walking champion (2003, 2006, 2007, and 2008), a 2007 U.S. 50-km race walking champion, and a former 30-km record holder (record was set in 2006 and held until 2024). Eastler was an officer in the United States Air Force from 1999-2008, achieving the rank of Major.

== Early life and education ==
Eastler, a native of Farmington, Maine, started race walking at the age of nine, following in the footsteps of his father Tom, and his sister Gretchen, both of whom were competitive walkers. He earned numerous age group records and All-American titles, before entering the United States Air Force Academy in the summer of 1995. During his first three years, Eastler focused his efforts on academics and cross-country skiing. Upon reaching his senior year, he started training again with race walking, qualifying for the World Cup, and finishing fifth at the national championships. In 1999, Eastler graduated with a bachelor's degree in mechanical engineering, and a commission as second lieutenant in the Air Force.

== Professional career ==
After graduating from the academy, Eastler spent his first assignment with the World Class Athlete Program in Chula Vista, California. Training full-time for the 2000 Summer Olympics in Sydney, Australia, he finished in second place at the U.S. Olympic Trials, but was denied a spot on the United States team, as he failed to achieve an A-qualifying standard time. Eastler stopped race walking for over a year until he was reassigned to Francis E. Warren Air Force Base in Cheyenne, Wyoming.

In 2003, Eastler reached his breakthrough season by winning the race walk at the U.S. Outdoor Track & Field Championships, with a time of 1:23:52. He also posted a huge personal best in the men's 20 km walk at the IAAF World Championships in Paris, France, by placing eighteenth, tying the highest finish ever by a U.S. walker in the event, with his time of 1:22:25. Because of his outstanding achievement in the sport, Eastler was named the Male Athlete of the Year by the U.S. Air Force.

Eastler qualified for the second time at the 2004 U.S. Olympic Trials in Sacramento, California, where he finished third in the 20 km race walk, with a time of 1:28:39. Having achieved an A-standard time from the IAAF World Championships, he earned a spot on the United States team for his first Olympics.

At the 2004 Summer Olympics, Eastler competed as a member of the U.S. track and field team in the men's 20 km race walk, along with his teammates Tim Seaman and John Nunn. He finished twenty-first in this event by three seconds behind Seaman, with a time of 1:25:20.

In 2006, Eastler set a record-breaking time of 2:12:53 at the U.S. 30-km Race Walk Championships in Chula Vista, California. He also claimed his second U.S. championship title, and posted three fastest times by an American in the 20 km race walk. Eastler ended his season as being ranked no. 1 in the United States at the distance for the second time in his career, and the first since 2003.

In 2007, Eastler established himself as America's preeminent male race walker. He won his third consecutive title in the 20 km and added the 50 km title, with a personal best time of 4:05:44 at the U.S. Outdoor Track & Field Championships. He also competed at the IAAF World Championships in Osaka, Japan, where he finished twenty-eighth in the 20 km race walk, and thirty-first in the 50 km, posting his time of 1:28:29 and 4:31:52, respectively.

Eastler earned a spot on the United States team for the 2008 Summer Olympics in Beijing, by winning the race walk at the U.S. Olympic Trials in Eugene, Oregon, with an A-standard time of 1:22:56. Eastler competed as a lone athlete in the men's 20 km race walk, where he successfully finished the race in forty-third place by nineteen seconds behind Kazakhstan's Rustam Kuvatov, with a time of 1:28:44.

== Personal bests ==
Event	Best	Venue	Year	Notes
10 km walk	39:32	Bergen, Norway	April 20, 2004	
20 km walk	1:22:25	Paris, France	August 23, 2003	
50 km walk	4:05:44	Chula Vista, California, United States	January 28, 2007	

- All information taken from IAAF profile.
