= Thomas Schneeberger =

American handball player

Tom Schneeberger
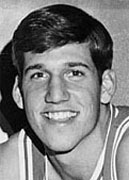

Personal information
- Full name: Thomas Schneeberger
- Born: May 18, 1956 (age 70) Ann Arbor, Michigan, U.S.
- Height: 6 ft 11 in (2.10 m)

Sport
- Sport: Handball
- Current club: retired

Senior clubs
- Years: Team
- –: Air Force Falcons
National team
- Years: Team
- 1976-1987: United States
- Basketball career

Career information
- High school: Pioneer (Ann Arbor, Michigan)
- College: Air Force (1974–1978)
- NBA draft: 1978: 9th round, 183rd overall pick
- Drafted by: Denver Nuggets
- Position: Power forward
- Stats at Basketball Reference
Medals
Men's handball
Representing the United States
Pan American Games
Gold medal – first place	1987 Indianapolis	Team
Goodwill Games
Silver medal – second place	1986 Moscow	Team

Thomas Schneeberger (born May 18, 1956) is an American former handball player who competed in the 1984 Summer Olympics.

== Basketball ==
He played for the Air Force Falcons from season 1974-75 until 1977–78.

In 1978 he was honored as most valuable basketball player and academy's most valuable athlete.

He became a ninth round draft pick in 1978 NBA draft.

He played with the team USA at the 1978 FIBA World Championship where they received the 5th place.

He participated at the 1979 and 1981-83 World Military Championships.

== Handball ==
In the year 1976 he and Bob Djokovich started a handball club at the USAFA and won 6 times the handball nationals.

From 1976 he was national player at the United States men's national handball team. At the Summer Olympics in 1984 was he scored 21 goals. He's biggest victories are the gold medal at the Pan American Games in 1987
