= Senior airman =

US Air Force military rank

Senior Airman
- Current insignia. Formerly, old "buck sergeant" insignia.

- Former insignia (1975-1991)
- Country: United States
- Service branch: United States Air Force
- Abbreviation: SrA
- Rank group: Enlisted
- NATO rank code: OR-4
- Pay grade: E-4
- Formation: 30 December 1975
- Next higher rank: Staff sergeant
- Next lower rank: Airman first class
- Equivalent ranks: Corporal (USA & USMC); Petty officer third class (USN & USCG); Specialist 4 (USSF)

Senior airman (SrA) is the fourth enlisted rank (E-4) in the United States Air Force, just above airman first class and below staff sergeant. The rank designation is the same for male and female. Between its approval on 30 December 1975 (with implementation 1 June 1976) and 19 March 1991, senior airmen wore sleeve chevrons with blue center stars instead of silver to distinguish them from the non-commissioned officer rank of "sergeant", also a pay grade of E-4. The latter was abolished in 1991 and the blue center star was changed to white to conform to all enlisted rank chevrons.

The Air Force promotes an airman first class (A1C) to senior airman after 36 months "time in service" (TIS) and 20 months "time in grade" (TIG), or 28 months TIG, whichever occurs first. Outstanding airmen first class, limited to no more than 15 percent of the total, may be promoted to senior airmen six months early, in a competitive process called below the zone. Senior airmen are expected to be technically proficient and begin to develop leadership skills, and may be expected to supervise an airman of lesser rank. Senior airmen must attend the five-week Airman Leadership School, the first course of the Air Force's college of enlisted professional military education, before being promoted to staff sergeant. SrAs with no projected promotion and between three and six years TIS, may attend Airman Leadership School.

== History ==
Formerly, from 1976 to 1991, this grade was divided into ranks with separate titles: sergeant (referred to unofficially but almost universally within the USAF as "buck sergeant" or simply "buck"), a non-commissioned officer; and senior airman, which is the equivalent of specialist, a non-supervisory rank. Senior airmen were promoted to sergeant after 12 months' TIG and completion of the now-defunct Non-commissioned Officer Preparatory Course. This schism reflected a desire by the Air Force in 1976 to subdivide enlisted ranks into a three-tier organization, a move which was resisted by the Chief Master Sergeant of the Air Force, resulting in the compromise dual-rank that lasted fifteen years. The last Air Force promotions to sergeant were effective 1 April 1991. Those personnel who had been promoted to sergeant prior to this cut off date retained the rank until being promoted to a higher rank or leaving the service. There are no longer any personnel on active duty who hold this rank. Due to high year of tenure rules in effect at the time, the last person to hold the rank was forced out of the Air Force on 23 March 1998. Sergeants wore the same chevrons as present-day senior airmen. Senior airmen wore similar chevrons, but with a blue (green on the fatigue or battle dress uniform) subdued central star, as did all airmen in the lowest tier.

The ranks of senior airman and sergeant held the same pay grade (E-4), but sergeants were expected to supervise other airmen as part of their duties as non-commissioned officers. As with any change in policy, many airmen supported this change, while others protested. Those Air Force members against the change protested that the rank of sergeant prepared airmen for transition to staff sergeant, and that new staff sergeants would therefore be less well-trained for their new position. In addition, senior airmen who complete Airman Leadership School may be expected to supervise lower-ranking airmen but are not considered non-commissioned officers and therefore have limited authority. Air Force personnel who supported the change argued that proper leadership training eliminated the need for a separate rank within the pay grade; moreover, the rank created disparity between individuals earning the same pay and benefits and, often, performing the same duties, since often there were no additional junior airmen in a given duty section for a new buck sergeant to supervise. While this may have been controversial in the Air Force, the U.S. Army has had E-4 Specialists and E-4 Corporals since 1959, with Corporals being an NCO and Specialists being a junior soldier. Both get paid the same.

Senior airmen are the lowest USAF rank eligible for selection as USAF recruiters, and (before the fall of 2013) as military training instructors for USAF basic military training.

As of 1998, the USAF and the US Space Force are the only United States military services that do not have a non-commissioned officer rank at the E-4 pay grade. Previously, from 1947 to 1952, and from late 1968 or early 1969 to 1997, the rank of sergeant (E-4) was a non-commissioned officer rank in the USAF. In the interim, from 1952 to at least early 1968, the pay grade rank was titled "airman first class".

== See also ==
- United States military pay
