= Cale Simmons =

American pole vaulter (born 1991)

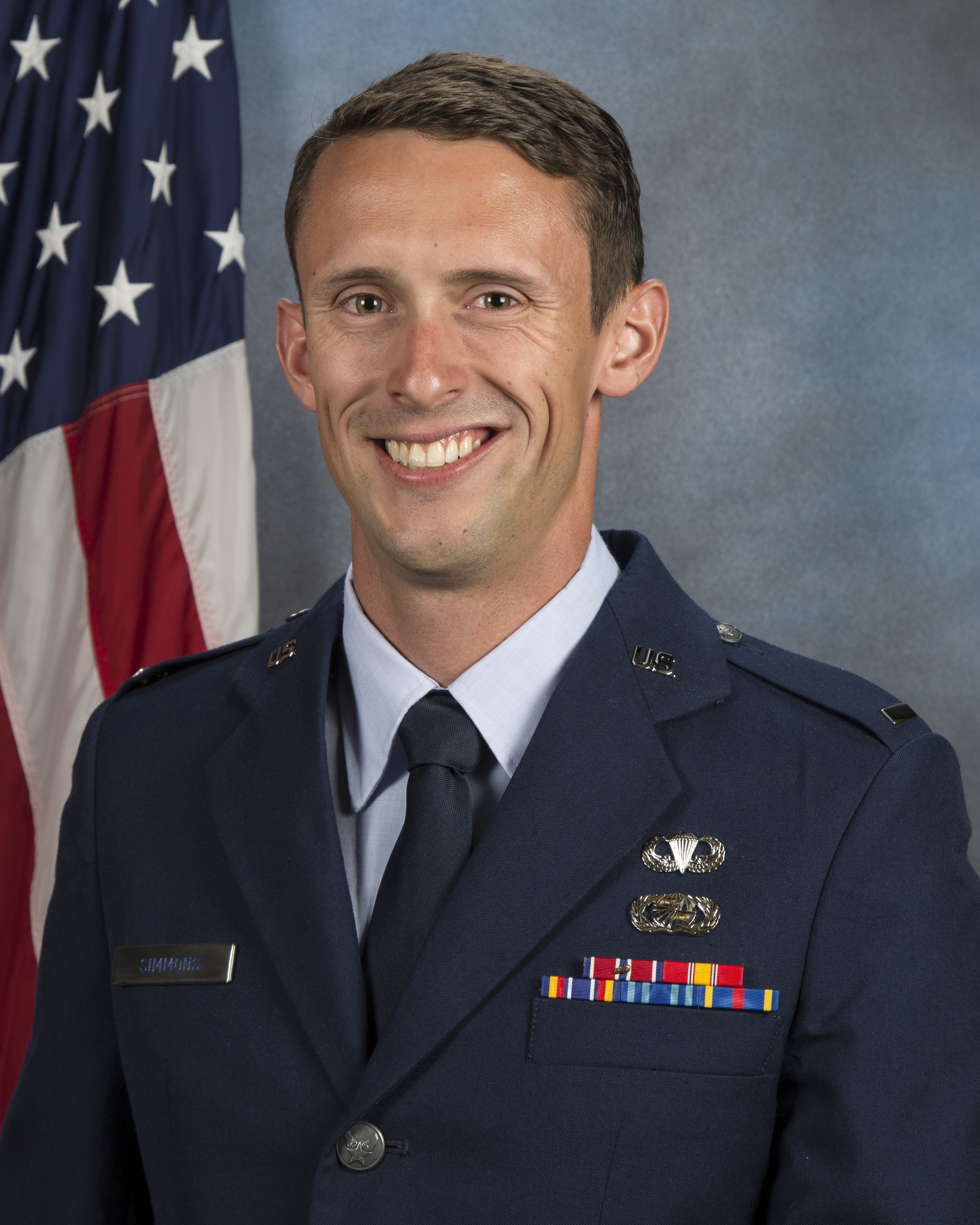

Personal information
- Born: February 5, 1991 (age 35)
- Height: 6 ft 0 in (1.83 m)
- Weight: 145 lb (66 kg)

Sport
- Country: United States
- Sport: Track and field
- Event: Pole vault

Cale Simmons (born February 5, 1991) is an American track and field athlete who competes in the pole vault. He was runner-up at the USA Outdoor Track and Field Championships in 2016 and was chosen for the 2016 Rio Olympics.

A member of the United States Air Force and based in Rocklin, California, he began competing in the pole vault at a high level in 2012 and set a best of 5.53 m (18 ft 1 1/2 in). This placed him in the top twenty American athletes for the year. The following year he improved to 5.61 m (18 ft 4 3/4 in).

He dropped out of the sport for a couple of years but returned in better form in 2016. He made the national podium at the 2016 USA Indoor Track and Field Championships. A week before the trials, he set his personal record and qualifying mark for the Olympics at an obscure meet called the Kyle MacIntosh Twilight at Valor Christian High School in Highlands Ranch, Colorado, a meet primarily for high school and middle school aged athletes. The pole vault was the only event open for open athletes and only 5 jumped.

He entered the 2016 United States Olympic Trials and jumped 5.65 m (18 ft 6 1/4 in) to make his first American Olympic team.
