= Robert D. Beckel =

United States Air Force general

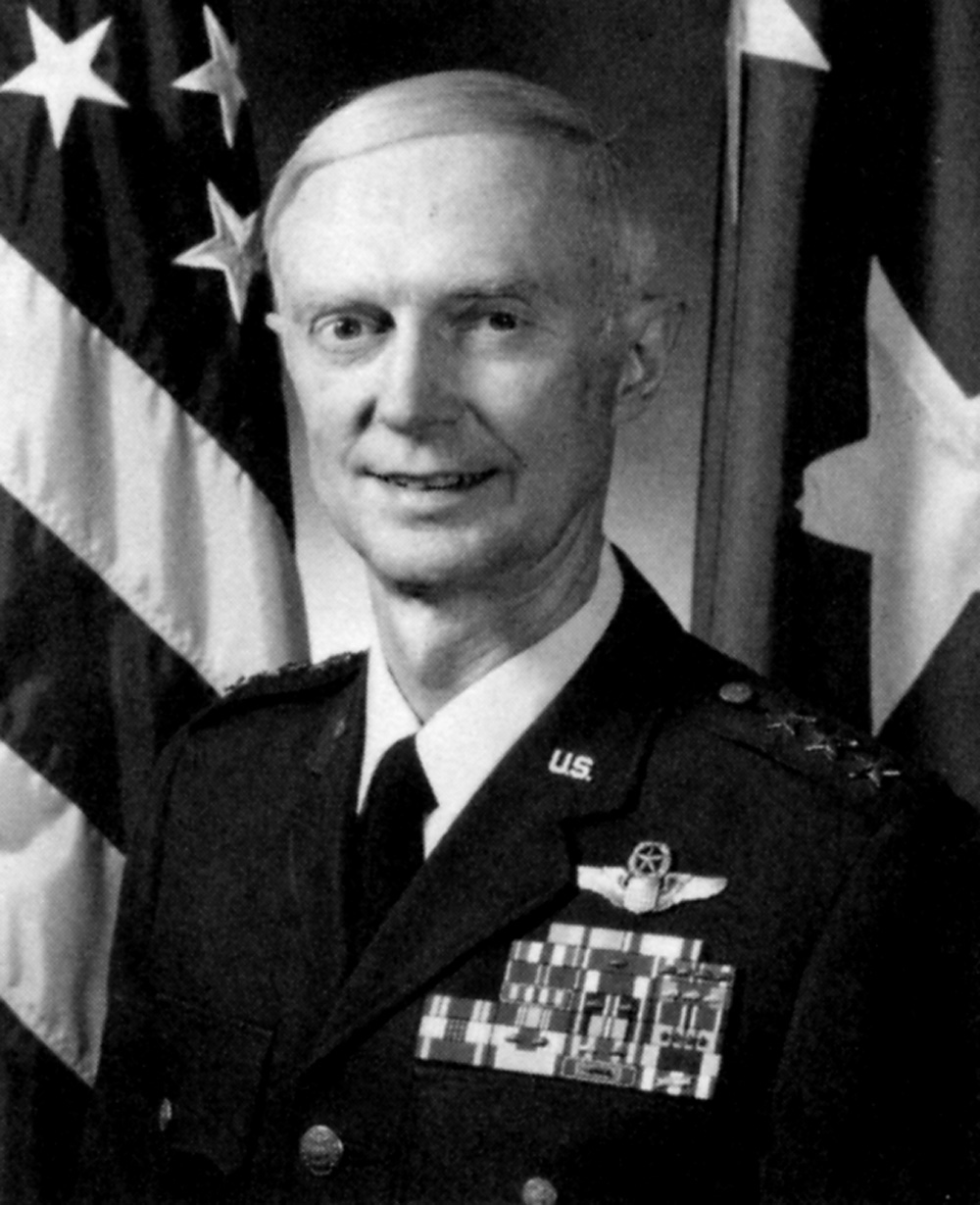
- Born: January 2, 1937; Walla Walla, Washington, U.S.
- Died: November 8, 2025; The Woodlands, Texas, U.S.
- Military career
- Allegiance: United States of America
- Branch: United States Air Force
- Service years: 1959–1992
- Rank: Lieutenant general

Robert Duane Beckel (January 2, 1937 - November 8, 2025) was a retired lieutenant general in the United States Air Force. He was the commander of the Fifteenth Air Force at March Air Force Base, California.

Beckel was born in Walla Walla, Washington, in 1937. He earned a Bachelor of Science degree from the U.S. Air Force Academy in 1959 as a member of its first class, and a Master of Science degree in international affairs from George Washington University in 1971. He completed the Naval Command and Staff Course in 1971, and National War College in 1975. Upon graduation from the academy, he was commissioned as a second lieutenant. He received pilot wings in June 1960 at Vance Air Force Base, Okla., where he was the outstanding graduate of his class. He then completed jet fighter training at Luke Air Force Base, Arizona, and Nellis Air Force Base, Nevada. In August 1961 General Beckel was assigned to the 49th Tactical Fighter Wing, Spangdahlem Air Base, West Germany, where he flew F-100s and F-105s.

He next became a member of the U.S. Air Force Aerial Demonstration Squadron, the Thunderbirds. From December 1965 to December 1967 he flew the solo position for the "Ambassadors in Blue" in demonstrations throughout the world. While serving as flight commander of the 614th Tactical Fighter Squadron, South Vietnam, he flew 313 combat missions in the F-100 from December 1967 until January 1969. He returned to Nellis Air Force Base and joined the 4525th Fighter Weapons Wing as an F-100 instructor. Beckel served as executive officer for the wing commander and then moved to the 66th Fighter Weapons Squadron as an operational test and evaluation officer, flying the F-105. Beckel attended the Command and Staff Course at the Naval War College from August 1970 to June 1971. He then was assigned to the Office of Legislative Liaison, Secretary of the Air Force, Washington, D.C., where he worked in the House of Representatives. In 1972 he became chief aide to Admiral Thomas H. Moorer, chairman of the Joint Chiefs of Staff.

He entered the National War College in August 1974. Upon graduation in July 1975, he served as vice commander of the 9th Strategic Reconnaissance Wing, Beale Air Force Base, Calif., and flew SR-71s and T-38s. There he became commander of the 100th Combat Support Group in October 1976 and, later, the 100th Air Refueling Wing. In August 1978 Beckel transferred to K.I. Sawyer Air Force Base, Mich., as commander of the 410th Bombardment Wing. In June 1979 he became commander of 7th Air Division, Strategic Air Command, Ramstein Air Base, West Germany.

Beckel returned to the Air Force Academy in February 1981 as commandant of cadets. In June 1982 he became director of operations, Office of the Deputy Chief of Staff, Plans and Operations, Headquarters U.S. Air Force, Washington, D.C. He transferred to Headquarters Strategic Air Command, Offutt Air Force Base, Neb., In September 1984 as deputy chief of staff for operations, and in October 1985 became chief of staff. Beckel was assigned to Europe in July 1987 as deputy chairman, NATO Military Committee, Headquarters North Atlantic Treaty Organization, Brussels, Belgium.

He is a command pilot with more than 4,400 flying hours. His military awards and decorations include the Defense Distinguished Service Medal, Distinguished Service Medal, Silver Star, Legion of Merit with oak leaf cluster, Distinguished Flying Cross with four oak leaf clusters, Bronze Star Medal, Meritorious Service Medal and Air Medal with 15 oak leaf clusters. He was named to the Helms All-American basketball team in 1959, and was on the U.S. Air Forces in Europe and all-Air Force basketball teams in 1961.

He was promoted to lieutenant general Aug. 1, 1987, with same date of rank and retired on June 1, 1992. After retirement, he served as the Superintendent of New Mexico Military Institute from summer 1996 to summer 2004, and later as a consultant of secondary-education schools overseas. He died at the age of 88 on November 8, 2025, in The Woodlands, Texas.
