= William Burton Roy =

American sport shooter (born 1958)

Bill Roy
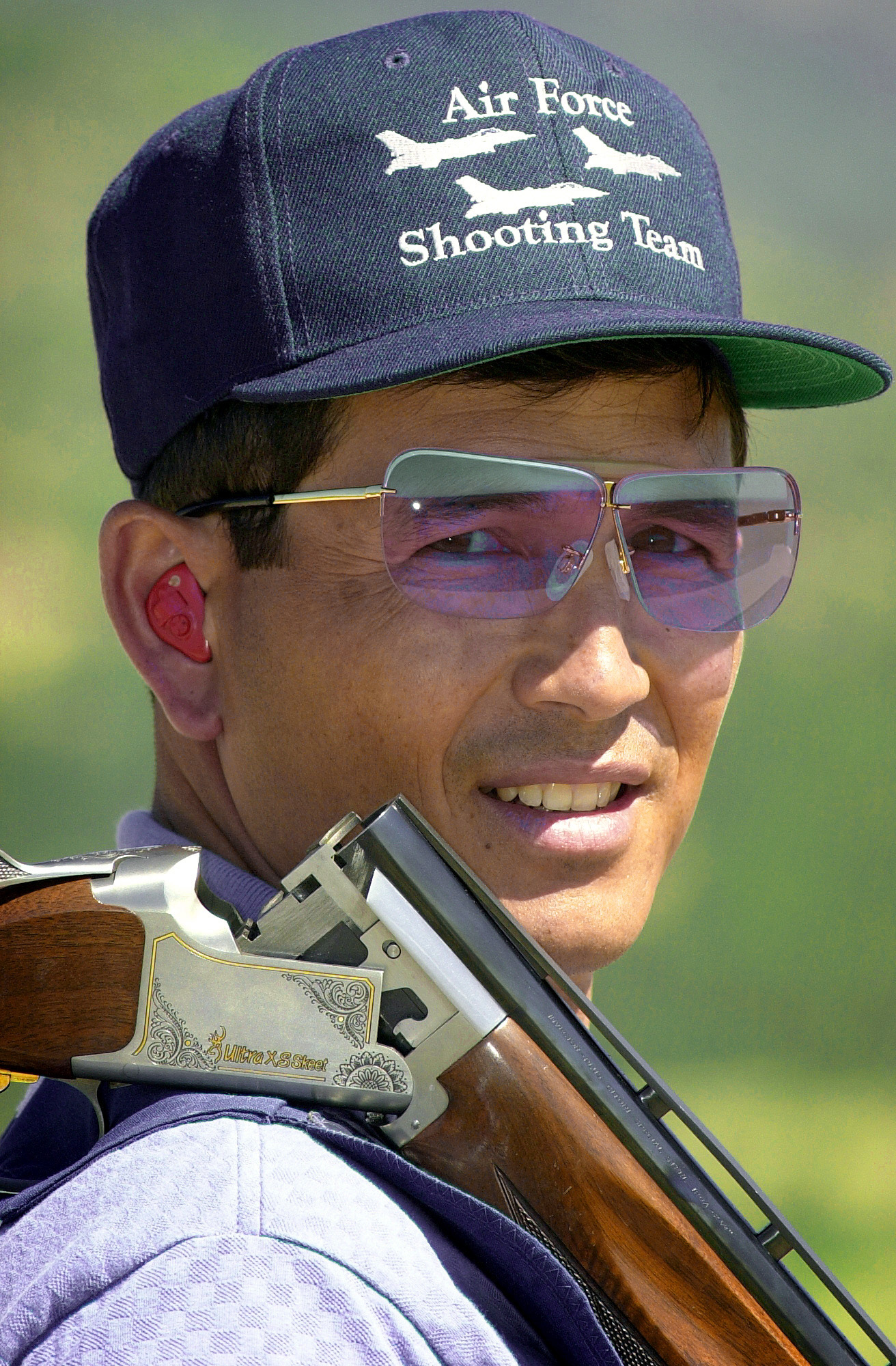
- Roy in 2000

Personal information
- Born: William Burton Roy; December 4, 1958 (age 67) Versailles, Illinois

William Burton "Bill" Roy (born December 4, 1958) is a retired lieutenant colonel in the United States Air Force and former U.S. Olympian in skeet shooting.

== Biography ==
Bill Roy was born on December 4, 1958 in Versailles, Illinois. He attended the United States Air Force Academy in Colorado Springs, Colorado. Although the Academy's admissions director told Roy he "had a snowball's chance in hell" of gaining admission, he not only graduated but was elected as a class president. He is a member of the Church of Jesus Christ of Latter-day Saints (LDS Church). A former bishop, Roy's activity in the church began when he met then-fellow cadet Douglas J. Kirkpatrick, an aeronautics engineer famous for his appearance in a Michael Jordan Nike shoe commercial. Upon graduation in 1981, he married Vickie Norton. They have five children. He received his master's degree in English Literature from the University of North Carolina. Today, Roy is the Chief Operating Officer for the El Paso County (Colorado) Republican Party.

== United States Air Force ==
Bill Roy served twenty years active duty in the United States Air Force, attaining the rank of lieutenant colonel. In addition to working as an English professor at the Air Force Academy, Roy was a squadron commander for the Red Flag training exercises. After retiring from active duty, Roy worked as a commercial airline pilot for United Airlines flying Boeing 747s.

== Shooting ==
An outdoors enthusiast from a young age, Bill Roy had a successful career in skeet shooting. Partially attributing his success to his Native American background, Roy suggests "Shooting is part of the heritage of the American people. It's one of the skills that early settlers and pioneers needed to survive in the wilderness." He won a gold medal at the 1991 World Skeet Shooting championships. That same year, he set three world records in skeet shooting at the Pan Am games. He also won a bronze medal in the same event at the world championships in 1993.

He participated in the 1996 Summer Olympic Games in skeet shooting, finishing 9th in the Men's skeet shooting competition. He was the captain of the USA Shooting team at the Atlanta games. He narrowly missed qualifying for the 2000 and 2004 Olympic games in skeet shooting. According to the United States Air Force, he is a four-time world champion in rifle shooting competition. After retiring from active competition, Roy was an assistant coach for the Air Force Academy shooting team and Director of Operations of USA Shooting.
