= Airman first class =

US Air Force military rank

Airman First Class
- Airman First Class

- Airman First Class insignia 1976–1991
- Country: United States
- Service branch: United States Air Force
- Abbreviation: A1C
- Rank group: Enlisted
- NATO rank code: OR-3
- Pay grade: E-3
- Next higher rank: Senior Airman (USAF)
- Next lower rank: Airman (USAF)
- Equivalent ranks: Seaman (Navy & USCG); Private first class (USA); Lance corporal (USMC); Specialist 3 (USSF)

Airman first class (A1C) is the third enlisted rank in the United States Air Force, just above airman and below senior airman. The male form of rank designation also applies to women. The rank of airman first class is considered a junior enlisted rank, with the non-commissioned officers and senior non-commissioned officers above it.

Airman first class is a rank that has also been used by the U.S. Navy and the U.S. Coast Guard, although it is not currently in use. In documents about the history of U.S. armed forces, this combination of pay grade and rate is abbreviated as "A1C".

== Etymology ==
Airmen first class are often nicknamed "dragonfly wings" due to the insignia's resemblance to that insect's two pairs of wings.

== History ==
At its cleanest, the rank name "airman first class", created in 1952, first applied to the paygrade rank of E-4 (1952–1967), then was applied to the paygrade of E-3, from 1967 onward.

Over those years, as the air force changed rank names for the E-1 through E-4 paygrades, some names were moved between ranks. In greater detail, from 1947 to 1952, the E-3 rank was named "air force corporal", renamed "airman second class" (A2C) in 1952, and, as stated, renamed airman first class since 1967. From 1952 to 1959, the E-1 rank was "basic airman", wording rearranged to airman basic from 1959, left unchanged since; the E-2 rank was "airman third class" (A3C), renamed to simply airman in 1967; and, from 1952 to 1967, the E-4 rank was, as stated, "airman first class", renamed to "air force sergeant" (a.k.a. "buck sergeant"), a supervisory non-commissioned officer, in 1967, with the name senior airman added as a second, non-supervisory, E-4 rank in 1976 – continuing until 1998, when the last E-4 buck sergeant left the Air Force, and all remaining (and future) E-4s carried the name senior airman.

== Criteria ==
Promotion to airman first class occurs upon one or more of the following:

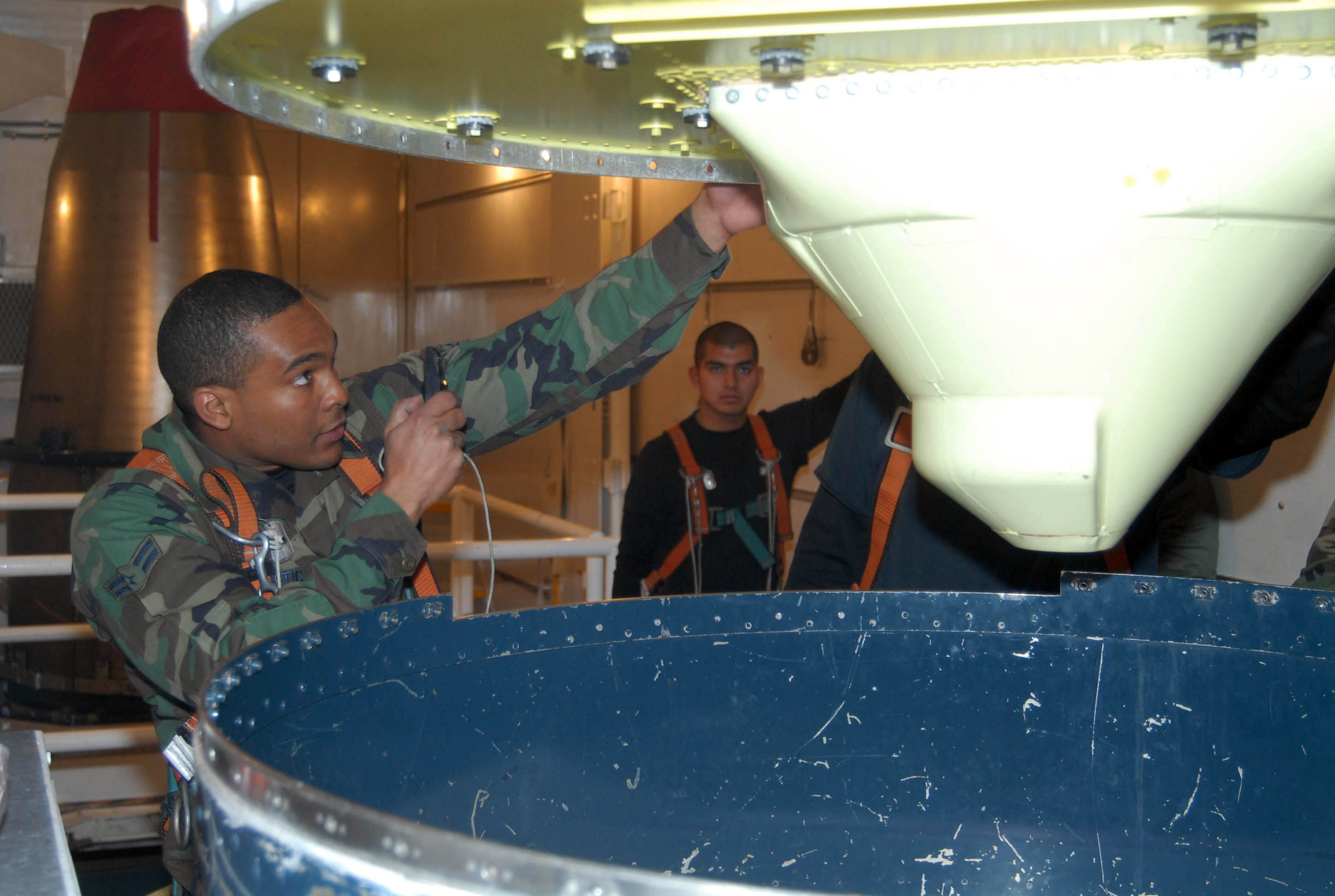
An airman first class-ranked technician

- Completion of 10 months time in the grade of airman (or earlier for airmen with specific specialities)
- Completion of three years of the Junior Reserve Officers' Training Corps (JROTC) sponsored by any of the four branches of the service
- Completion of two years of college-level Reserve Officer Training Corps (ROTC)
- Earning the Billy Mitchell Award in the Civil Air Patrol
- Completion of at least 45 semester hours or at least 67 quarter hours of accredited junior college/college credits.
- Agreeing to an extended-length enlistment (normally six years).

Those personnel who qualify for these early promotions to airman first class wear the insignia of this rank during their basic training graduation ceremonies at Lackland Air Force Base in San Antonio, Texas, except for those who signed up for an extended enlistment, who receive their promotions to airman first class twenty weeks after graduation from basic military training or graduation from their technical training schools, whichever comes first. Enlistees who have signed up for initial six-year enlistment periods have usually qualified and done so in return for a guarantee of up to two years of training in Department of Defense and Air Force schools in highly-technical specialities such as electronics, weapons systems, physician's assistant or nursing. To qualify, the enlistee must have graduated from high school and scored highly on Air Force technical aptitude tests. In other words, they spend up to two years in training at the expense of the Air Force, and then pay it back by serving at least an additional four years after their schooling, receiving an early promotion to airman first class as additional compensation. (Note: The U.S. Navy has very similar six-year enlistments for nuclear power, and electronics.)

Those who are promoted to this level upon completion of basic training also receive a retroactive pay increment that brings them up to the E-3 pay grade corresponding to airman first class, going back to day one of their enlistment. In other words, they receive back pay as if they had enlisted as an airman first class. However, if for some reason they are relieved from basic training before completion, they do not receive this extra pay and are paid as airmen basic for the time that they spent in the Air Force before getting discharged, after the Air Force deducts the cost of basic hygiene products and other costs like shaving razors from the recruits.

Airmen first class are considered to be fully adjusted to Air Force and military life, and their duties focus on efficiently and effectively carrying out their assignments and honing their job skills.

== See also ==
- U.S. Air Force enlisted rank insignia
- United States military pay
