= USA Team Handball College Nationals =

American college team handball tournament

College Nationals Collegiate National Championships
Tournament information
- Sport: Handball
- Month played: March - April
- Established: 1996
- Format: Round Robin, Knockout Stage

Current champion
- Men's: West Point Black; Women's: West Point Black

The USA Team Handball College National Championships is a team handball tournament to determine the Men's and Women's College National Champion from the United States.

== History ==
Prior to 1996, the highest placing college team at USA Team Handball Nationals was recognized as College Champion. After the 1996 Atlanta Summer Olympic Games the College Nationals were founded.

Army has the most collegiate championships of any school, with a combined 65 between the men's and women's teams.

== Men's ==
Record champion is Army with, at minimum, 40 titles. The college has also the most continuous titles with 18 from 2007 until now.

== Women's ==
Army has the most titles with at least 25. The college has also the most consecutive titles with seven from 2012 until 2017.

== Medal count ==
=== Men's Medal count ===
Rank	College	Gold	Silver	Bronze	Total
1	West Point	40	12	3	55
2	University of North Carolina	3	10	11	24
3	Air Force Academy	3	4	10	17
4	Willamette University	2	0	0	2
5	University of Southern California	1	0	1	2
6	Adelphi University	1	0	0	1
7	Ohio State University	0	2	1	3
8	University of Virginia	0	2	0	2
9	UCLA	0	1	1	2
10	Middle Georgia State University	0	0	2	2
11	Georgia State University	0	0	1	1
Totals (11 entries)		50	31	30	111

=== Women's Medal count ===
Rank	College	Gold	Silver	Bronze	Total
1	West Point	25	9	10	44
2	University of North Carolina	5	11	2	18
3	Slippery Rock University of Pennsylvania	2	1	0	3
4	Kansas State University	2	0	0	2
5	Ohio State University	1	1	4	6
6	United States Air Force Academy	1	1	0	2
7	Pennsylvania State University	1	0	1	2
8	California State University, Fullerton	1	0	0	1
8	Cortland State	1	0	0	1
8	University of Minnesota	1	0	0	1
11	Furman University	0	3	2	5
12	Benedict College	0	1	0	1
12	Lander University	0	1	0	1
14	Middle Georgia State University	0	0	1	1
14	Virginia Commonwealth University	0	0	1	1
Totals (15 entries)		40	28	21	89

=== Total Medal count ===
Rank	College	Gold	Silver	Bronze	Total
1	West Point	65	21	13	99
2	University of North Carolina	8	21	13	42
3	Air Force Academy	4	5	10	19
4	Slippery Rock University of Pennsylvania	2	1	0	3
5	Kansas State University	2	0	0	2
5	Willamette University	2	0	0	2
7	Ohio State University	1	3	5	9
8	Pennsylvania State University	1	0	1	2
8	University of Southern California	1	0	1	2
10	Adelphi University	1	0	0	1
10	California State University, Fullerton	1	0	0	1
10	Cortland State	1	0	0	1
10	University of Minnesota	1	0	0	1
14	Furman University	0	3	2	5
15	University of Virginia	0	2	0	2
16	UCLA	0	1	1	2
17	Benedict College	0	1	0	1
17	Lander University	0	1	0	1
19	Middle Georgia State University	0	0	3	3
20	Georgia State University	0	0	1	1
20	Virginia Commonwealth University	0	0	1	1
Totals (21 entries)		90	59	51	200
