= 2004 USA Team Handball College Nationals – Women's Division =

2004 College Nationals - Women's Division
- Season: 2003–04
- Dates: 12 - 14. March 2004
- Champion: University of North Carolina
- Matches played: 17
- Goals scored: 321 (18.88 per match)
- Best Player: Katie Hart; University of North Carolina
- Top goalscorer: Brittany Martin (36 goals); Rock THB
- Best goalkeeper: Elizabeth Salem; Furman University
- All statistics correct as of 2018-05-20.

The 2004 College Nationals was the 9th Women's College Nationals. The College Nationals was a team handball tournament to determined the College National Champion from 2004 from the US.

== Venues ==
The championship was played at three venues at the University of North Carolina in Chapel Hill, North Carolina.

Chapel Hill	2004 USA Team Handball College Nationals – Women's Division is located in the United States	Chapel Hill
Woollen Gymnasium	2004 USA Team Handball College Nationals – Women's Division is located in the United States	Fetzer Hall A
Capacity: 6,000	2004 USA Team Handball College Nationals – Women's Division is located in the United States	Capacity: ?
	2004 USA Team Handball College Nationals – Women's Division is located in the United States	Fetzer Hall B
	2004 USA Team Handball College Nationals – Women's Division is located in the United States	Capacity: ?

== Modus ==
Location of 2003 USA Team Handball College Nationals Women's Division Teams
The bigger size of the West Point Logo show that they have two teams.

The five teams and one adult teams were split in two groups each team played two round robins. Rock THB was automatically ranked last.

The two first teams from each group played the semis.

The last of group A played against Rock THB.

The losers of the semis play a small final.

The winners of the semis play the final.

== Results ==
=== Group stage ===
==== Group A ====
Team	Pld	W	D	L	GF	GA	GD	Pts
University of North Carolina	4	3	0	1	37	14	+23	6
Furman University	4	3	0	1	41	18	+23	6
West Point Black	4	0	0	4	10	56	−46	0

12 March 2004; 19:00 (UTC-5)	West Point Black	3-15	Furman University	Fetzer Hall A, UNC

13 March 2004; 8:00 (UTC-5)	West Point Black	1-11	University of North Carolina	Fetzer Hall B, UNC

13 March 2004; 11:00 (UTC-5)	University of North Carolina	4-5	Furman University	Woollen Gymnasium, UNC

13 March 2004; 14:00 (UTC-5)	West Point Black	3-16	Furman University	Woollen Gymnasium, UNC

13 March 2004; 17:00 (UTC-5)	University of North Carolina	8-5	Furman University	Fetzer Hall B, UNC

13 March 2004; 20:00 (UTC-5)	West Point Black	3-14	University of North Carolina	Fetzer Hall B, UNC

==== Group B ====
Team	Pld	W	D	L	GF	GA	GD	Pts
West Point Gold	4	3	0	1	52	34	+18	6
Benedict College	4	0	0	4	24	59	−35	0
Rock THB	4	3	0	1	59	42	+17	6

12 March 2004; 19:00 (UTC-5)	West Point Gold	10-5	Benedict College	Fetzer Hall B, UNC

13 March 2004; 8:00 (UTC-5)	West Point Gold	15-8	Rock THB	Woollen Gymnasium, UNC

13 March 2004; 11:00 (UTC-5)	Rock THB	16-8	Benedict College	Fetzer Hall B, UNC

13 March 2004; 14:00 (UTC-5)	West Point Gold	14-5	Benedict College	Fetzer Hall B, UNC

13 March 2004; 17:00 (UTC-5)	Rock THB	19-6	Benedict College	Woollen Gymnasium, UNC

13 March 2004; 20:00 (UTC-5)	West Point Gold	13-16	Rock THB	Fetzer Hall A, UNC

=== Championship ===
Semifinals
A1	University of North Carolina	8
B2	Benedict College	3
A2	Furman University	12
B1	West Point Gold	10

Final
A1	University of North Carolina	10
A2	Furman University	6
Small Final
B2	Benedict College	7
B1	West Point Gold	26

==== Semifinals ====
14 March 2004; 8:00 (UTC-5)	University of North Carolina	8-3	Benedict College	Fetzer Hall A, UNC

14 March 2004; 8:00 (UTC-5)	Furman University	12-10	West Point Gold	Fetzer Hall B, UNC

==== Small Final ====
14 March 2004; 11:30 (UTC-5)	Benedict College	7-26	West Point Gold	Fetzer Hall B, UNC

==== Final ====
14 March 2004; 11:30 (UTC-5)	University of North Carolina	10-6	Furman University	Fetzer Hall A, UNC

=== Consolation 5-6th Place ===
14 March 2004; 10:00 (UTC-5)	West Point Black	3-13	Rock THB	Fetzer Hall B, UNC

== Final ranking ==
Rank	Team
1st place, gold medalist(s)	University of North Carolina
2nd place, silver medalist(s)	Furman University
3rd place, bronze medalist(s)	West Point Gold
4	Benedict College
5	West Point Black

== Awards ==
Most Valuable Player:	Katie Hart	University of North Carolina
Most Valuable Goalkeeper:	Elizabeth Salem	Furman University
Top Scorer:	Brittany Martin	Rock THB

== Top scorers ==
Record

Rank	Name	Goals	Games	Average	Team
1st place, gold medalist(s)	Brittany Martin	36	5	7.2	Rock THB
2nd place, silver medalist(s)	Kimberly Webber	20	6	3.33	Benedict College
2nd place, silver medalist(s)	Joy Manning	20	5	4	Rock THB
2nd place, silver medalist(s)	Jordan Shireman	20	6	3.33	West Point Gold
5	Dorthy Ariail	19	6	3.17	University of North Carolina
6	Elizabeth Salem	16	6	2.67	Furman University
6	Celia Nowicki	16	6	2.67	West Point Gold
6	Natasha Rabsatt	16	6	2.67	West Point Gold
9	Jenny Combs	15	6	2.33	West Point Gold
10	Katie Easler	10	6	2.17	University of North Carolina
10	Ashley Hannifin	10	6	2.17	Furman University

== All-Tournament Team ==
Jordan Shireman	West Point Gold	2nd Top Scorer
Dorthy Ariail	University of North Carolina	5th Top Scorer
Natasha Rabsatt	West Point Gold	6th Top Scorer
Heather Parnell	University of North Carolina	14th Top Scorer
Thomas Jen	West Point Gold
Katie Easler	University of North Carolina	10th Top Scorer
Ashley Hannifi	Furman University	10th Top Scorer
