= 2019 USA Team Handball College Nationals – Women's Division =

2019 College Nationals - Women's Division
- Season: 2018–19
- Dates: 26 - 28. April 2019
- Champion: West Point Black
- Matches played: 10
- Goals scored: 289 (28.9 per match)
- Best Player: Maria Carolina Araujo (Pennsylvania State University)
- Top goalscorer: Maria Carolina Araujo (28 goals) (Pennsylvania State University)
- Best goalkeeper: Tasia Stevens (West Point Black)
- All statistics correct as of 2019-04-22.

The 2019 College Nationals is the 24th Women's College Nationals. The College Nationals is a team handball tournament to determine the College National Champion from 2019 from the US.

== Venues ==
The championship was played at two venues at the University of North Carolina at Chapel Hill in Chapel Hill, North Carolina.

Chapel Hill	2019 USA Team Handball College Nationals – Women's Division is located in the United States	Chapel Hill
Fetzer Hall	2019 USA Team Handball College Nationals – Women's Division is located in the United States	Fetzer B
Capacity: ?	2019 USA Team Handball College Nationals – Women's Division is located in the United States	Capacity: ?

== Modus ==
Location of 2019 USA Team Handball College Nationals Women's Division Teams
The bigger size of the West Point Logo show that they have two teams.

The four teams played first a round robin. 2 × 25 min game time.

The first plays against the 4th and 2nd against the 3rd of the Group stage the semis. 2 × 25 min game time.

The losers of the semis play a small final. 2 × 30 min game time.

The winners of the semis play the final. 2 × 30 min game time.

== Results ==
=== Group stage ===
Team	Pld	W	D	L	GF	GA	GD	Pts
West Point Black	3	3	0	0	38	37	+1	6
University of North Carolina	3	2	0	1	61	44	+17	4
Pennsylvania State University	3	1	0	2	46	53	−7	2
West Point Gold	3	0	0	3	24	80	−56	0

26 April 2019; 17:15 (UTC-4)	University of North Carolina	18 - 24	West Point Black	Fetzer Hall, University of North Carolina
26 April 2019; 17:15 (UTC-4)		Report		Fetzer Hall, University of North Carolina

26 April 2019; 19:45 (UTC-4)	West Point Gold	7 - 24	Pennsylvania State University	Fetzer B, University of North Carolina
26 April 2019; 19:45 (UTC-4)		Report		Fetzer B, University of North Carolina

27 April 2019; 8:00 (UTC-4)	West Point Black	28 - 11	Pennsylvania State University	Fetzer Hall, University of North Carolina
27 April 2019; 8:00 (UTC-4)		Report		Fetzer Hall, University of North Carolina

27 April 2019; 9:15 (UTC-4)	West Point Gold	17 - 29	University of North Carolina	Fetzer B, University of North Carolina
27 April 2019; 9:15 (UTC-4)		Report		Fetzer B, University of North Carolina

27 April 2019; 11:45 (UTC-4)	West Point Gold	8 - 31	West Point Black	Fetzer B, University of North Carolina
27 April 2019; 11:45 (UTC-4)		Report		Fetzer B, University of North Carolina

27 April 2019; 11:45 (UTC-4)	Pennsylvania State University	11 - 18	University of North Carolina	Fetzer Hall, University of North Carolina
27 April 2019; 11:45 (UTC-4)		Report		Fetzer Hall, University of North Carolina

=== Championship ===
Semifinals
GS1	West Point Black	21
GS4	West Point Gold	9
GS2	University of North Carolina	19
GS3	Pennsylvania State University	14

Final
GS1	West Point Black	19
GS2	University of North Carolina	14
Small Final
GS4	West Point Gold	9
GS3	Pennsylvania State University	15

==== Semifinals ====
27 April 2019; 15:30 (UTC-4)	West Point Black	21 - 9	West Point Gold	Fetzer Hall, University of North Carolina
27 April 2019; 15:30 (UTC-4)		Report		Fetzer Hall, University of North Carolina

27 April 2019; 16:45 (UTC-4)	University of North Carolina	19 - 14	Pennsylvania State University	Fetzer Hall, University of North Carolina
27 April 2019; 16:45 (UTC-4)		Report		Fetzer Hall, University of North Carolina

==== Small Final ====
28 April 2019; 8:00 (UTC-4)	West Point Gold	9 - 15	Pennsylvania State University	Fetzer Hall, University of North Carolina
28 April 2019; 8:00 (UTC-4)		Report		Fetzer Hall, University of North Carolina

==== Final ====
28 April 2019; 9:30 (UTC-4)	West Point Black	19 - 14	University of North Carolina	Fetzer Hall, University of North Carolina
28 April 2019; 9:30 (UTC-4)		Report		Fetzer Hall, University of North Carolina

== Final ranking ==
Rank	Team
1st place, gold medalist(s)	West Point Black
2nd place, silver medalist(s)	University of North Carolina
3rd place, bronze medalist(s)	Pennsylvania State University
4	West Point Gold

== Awards ==
Most Valuable Player:	Maria Carolina Araujo	Pennsylvania State University
Most Valuable Goalkeeper:	Tasia Stevens	West Point Black
Top Scorer:	Maria Carolina Araujo (28 goals)	Pennsylvania State University
