= Carolina Blue Cup =

- Logo of the Carolina Blue Cup

Tournament information
- Sport: Handball
- Location: Chapel Hill, North Carolina
- Month played: February
- Established: 1990; 36 years ago
- Number of tournaments: 28
- Format: Round Robin, Knockout Stage
- Host: Carolina THC
- Venue(s): Fetzer Gymnasiums, University of North Carolina at Chapel Hill
- Teams: 10–13
- Website: www.carolinateamhandball.org

Current champion
- New York Athletic Club

The Carolina Blue Cup is a team handball tournament which has been organized by the Carolina THC (Team Handball Club) since 1990. The competition, which involves many United States teams and a few from Canada, has been dominated by clubs from New York State. It has been won the most times by New York Athletic Club.

== History ==
The first tournament was held in 1990 which the SSC New Jersey won.

It is one of the largest and oldest handball tournament in the United States.

Record champion is the New York Athletic Club the club has also the most continues titles with eight.

== Men ==
=== Tournaments ===
Year	Final			3rd place match			Teams
Year	Champions	Score	Runners-up	3rd place	Score	4th place	Teams
1990; Details	SSC New Jersey		Carolina THC	Arlington			10
1991; Details	West Point Team Handball	19-17 (2nd OT) (15-15)	SSC New Jersey	USAFA Team Handball		Ohio State University	8
1992; Details	West Point Team Handball	26-19	SSC New Jersey	Garden City	31-17	Carolina THC	10
1993; Details	Garden City		West Point Team Handball	Atlanta THC		Carolina THC	10
1994; Details	Garden City		New York City THC	West Point Black		Carolina THC	10
1995; Details	Garden City		Winnipeg THC	SSC New Jersey			10
1996; Details	Team 2000		Garden City	Carolina Blue			10
1997; Details	Garden City		West Point Black	Carolina Blue		Carolina THC	10
1998; Details	West Point Black		Garden City	Carolina Blue		Condor Handball	10
1999; Details	Garden City	25-22	Knight Air	Carolina THC		West Point Gold	10
2000; Details	Garden City		Atlanta THC	West Point Gold		Carolina THC	10
2001; Details	Garden City	23-17	Atlanta THC	Condor Handball	23-18	SSC New Jersey	12
2002; Details	Garden City	20-16	North Carolina THC	Knight Air	23-15	Atlanta Metro	12
2003; Details	Garden City	28-22	Atlanta THC	DC Diplomats THC	22-18	Knight Air	12
2004; Details	Garden City	23-19	West Point Black	Carolina Blue	28-20	Knight Air	12
2005; Details	Garden City	20-17	Carolina THC	Atlanta Blue	21-16	Atlanta Metro	12
2006; Details	New York Athletic Club	21-18	Carolina THC	Atlanta Blue	27-18	Atlanta Metro	12
2007; Details	Carolina THC		Atlanta Metro	West Point Black			
2008; Details	New York City THC		West Point Black	Atlanta Metro			
2009; Details	West Point Black	36-27	ATH United	New York City THC		Carolina Blue	8
2010; Details	West Point Black	33-31 (OT)	Carolina THC	Carolina Blue		ATH United	
2011; Details	New York Athletic Club	26–21	Los Angeles THC	West Point Black	33-28	Houston Vikings	13
2012; Details	New York Athletic Club		Carolina Blue 1	Carolina Blue 2		Georgia HC	
2013; Details	New York Athletic Club		Alberta THC	Carolina Blue		Carolina THC	
2014; Details	New York Athletic Club	22-20	Knight Air	Carolina Blue	26-21	West Point Black	
2015; Details	New York Athletic Club	15-12	Carolina Blue	Carolina THC		West Point Black	12
2016; Details	New York Athletic Club		West Point Black	Carolina Blue		University of Virginia	
2017; Details	New York Athletic Club	22-16	Carolina Blue	Knight Air	29-27	University of Virginia	

=== Medal count ===
* Host nation (Carolina THC)

Rank	Team	Gold	Silver	Bronze	Total
1	New York Athletic Club	19	2	1	22
2	West Point (Black)	5	5	3	13
3	Carolina THC*	1	4	2	7
4	SSC New Jersey	1	2	1	4
5	New York City THC	1	1	1	3
6	Team 2000	1	0	0	1
7	Carolina Blue (1)*	0	3	8	11
8	Atlanta Team Handball	0	3	2	5
9	Knight Air	0	2	2	4
10	ATH Metro	0	1	1	2
11	ATH United	0	1	0	1
11	Alberta THC	0	1	0	1
11	Los Angeles THC	0	1	0	1
11	North Carolina THC*	0	1	0	1
11	Winnipeg THC	0	1	0	1
16	ATH Blue	0	0	1	1
16	Arlington THC	0	0	1	1
16	Carolina Blue 2*	0	0	1	1
16	Condor Handball	0	0	1	1
16	DC Diplomats THC	0	0	1	1
16	USAFA Team Handball	0	0	1	1
16	West Point Gold	0	0	1	1
Totals (22 entries)		28	28	28	84

* Host nation (Carolina THC)

Rank	Club	Gold	Silver	Bronze	Total
1	New York Athletic Club	19	2	1	22
2	West Point Team Handball	5	5	4	14
3	Carolina THC*	1	8	11	20
4	SSC New Jersey	1	2	1	4
5	New York City THC	1	1	1	3
6	Team 2000	1	0	0	1
7	Atlanta Team Handball	0	5	4	9
8	Knight Air	0	2	2	4
9	Alberta THC	0	1	0	1
9	Los Angeles THC	0	1	0	1
9	Winnipeg THC	0	1	0	1
12	Arlington THC	0	0	1	1
12	Condor Handball	0	0	1	1
12	DC Diplomats THC	0	0	1	1
12	USAFA Team Handball	0	0	1	1
Totals (15 entries)		28	28	28	84

=== Participation details ===
Club	Team	1990 (10)	1991 (8)	1992 (10)	1993 (10)	1994 (10)	1995 (10)	1996 (10)	1997 (10)	1998 (10)	1999 (10)	2000 (10)	2001 (12)	2002 (12)	2003 (12)	2004 (12)	2005 (12)	2006 (12)	2007 (?)	2008 (?)	2009 (8)	2010 (?)	2011 (13)	2012 (?)	2013 (?)	2014 (?)	2015 (12)	2016 (?)	2017 (?)	Total
Alabama THC	Alabama THC	•	•	•	•	•	•	•	•	8th	8th	8th	•	•	•	•	•	•	•	•	•	•	•	•	•	•	•	•	•	3
Alberta THC	Alberta THC	•	•	•	•	•	•	•	•	•	•	•	•	•	•	•	•	•	•	•	•	•	11th	•	2nd	•	•	•	•	2
Arlington THC	Arlington THC	3rd	5th	7th	•	•	•	•	•	•	•	•	•	•	•	•	•	•	•	•	•	•	•	•	•	•	•	•	•	3
Atlanta Storm	Atlanta Storm	•	•	•	•	•	•	•	•	5th	•	•	•	•	•	•	•	•	•	•	•	•	•	•	•	•	•	•	•	1
Atlanta Team Handball	Atlanta Team Handball	•	•	6th	3rd	•	•	•	•	10th	9th	2nd	2nd	7th	2nd	•	•	•	•	•	•	•	7th	•	•	•	•	•	•	9
Atlanta Team Handball	Atlanta Team Handball II	•	•	9th	•	•	•	•	•	•	•	•	•	•	12th	•	•	•	•	•	•	•	•	•	•	•	•	•	•	2
Atlanta Team Handball	Atlanta Blue	•	•	•	•	•	•	•	•	•	•	•	•	•	•	5th	3rd	3rd	•	•	•	•	•	•	•	•	•	•	•	3
Atlanta Team Handball	Atlanta Metro	•	•	•	•	•	•	•	•	•	7th	6th	10th	4th	5th	6th	4th	4th	2nd	3rd	•	•	•	•	•	•	•	•	•	10
Atlanta Team Handball	Atlanta United	•	•	•	•	•	•	•	•	•	•	•	•	•	•	•	•	•	•	•	2nd	4th	•	•	•	•	•	•	•	2
Atlanta Team Handball	Atlanta Red	•	•	•	•	•	•	•	•	•	•	•	•	•	•	9th	11th	9th	•	•	•	•	•	•	•	•	•	•	•	3
Blue Heat	Blue Head	•	•	•	•	•	•	•	•	•	•	•	•	•	•	•	•	8th	•	•	•	•	•	•	•	•	•	•	•	1
Carolina THC	Carolina THC	2nd	6th	4th	4th	4th	6th	7th	4th	6th	3rd	4th	5th	5th	10th	7th	2nd	2nd	1st	•	•	2nd	6th	•	4th	•	3rd	•	•	2
Carolina THC	Carolina Blue (1)	•	•	•	•	•	•	3rd	3rd	3rd	5th	5th	8th	8th	6th	3rd	6th	5th	•	•	4th	3rd	5th	2nd	3rd	3rd	2nd	3rd	2nd	20
Carolina THC	Carolina Blue 2	•	•	•	•	•	•	•	•	•	•	•	•	•	•	•	•	•	•	•	•	•	•	3rd	•	•	•	•	•	1
Carolina THC	North Carolina THC	•	•	•	•	•	•	•	•	•	•	•	9th	2nd	7th	•	5th	6th	•	•	•	•	•	•	•	•	•	•	•	5
Carolina THC	Tar Heels	•	8th	8th	•	•	•	•	•	•	10th	•	•	10th	•	12th	10th	12th	•	•	•	•	13th	•	•	•	•	•	•	8
Charlotte THC	Charlotte THC	•	•	•	•	•	•	•	•	•	•	•	•	•	•	•	•	•	•	•	•	•	12th	•	•	•	•	•	•	1
Cleveland THC	Cleveland THC	•	•	•	•	•	•	•	•	•	•	•	•	•	•	•	•	7th	•	•	•	•	•	•	•	•	•	•	•	1
Condor Handball	Condor Handball	•	•	•	•	•	•	•	•	4th	•	•	3rd	•	•	•	•	•	•	•	•	•	•	•	•	•	•	•	•	2
DC Diplomats THC	DC Diplomats THC	•	•	•	•	•	•	•	•	•	•	•	•	•	3rd	10th	•	•	•	•	•	•	10th	•	•	•	•	•	•	3
Georgia HC	Georgia HC	•	•	•	•	•	•	•	•	•	•	•	•	•	•	•	•	•	•	•	•	•	•	4th	•	•	•	•	•	1
Georgia Southern THC	Georgia Southern THC	•	•	•	•	•	•	•	•	•	•	10th	•	•	•	•	•	•	•	•	•	•	•	•	•	•	•	•	•	1
Houston Vikings	Houston Vikings	•	•	•	•	•	•	•	•	•	•	•	•	•	•	•	•	•	•	•	•	•	4th	•	•	•	•	•	•	1
Knight Air	Knight Air	•	•	•	•	•	•	•	•	•	2nd	•	•	3rd	4th	4th	•	11th	•	•	•	•	•	•	•	2nd	•	•	3rd	7
Jacksonville THC	Jacksonville THC	•	•	•	•	•	•	•	•	•	•	•	12th	•	•	•	•	•	•	•	•	•	•	•	•	•	•	•	•	1
JAX Knights	JAX Knights	•	•	•	•	•	•	•	•	•	•	•	•	•	8th	8th	8th	•	•	•	•	•	•	•	•	•	•	•	•	3
Los Angeles THC	Los Angeles THC	•	•	•	•	•	•	•	•	•	•	•	•	•	•	•	•	•	•	•	•	•	2nd	•	•	•	•	•	•	1
Miami Storm	Miami Storm	•	•	•	•	•	•	•	•	•	•	•	•	•	•	•	•	•	•	•	•	•	8th	•	•	•	•	•	•	1
New York Athletic Club	New York Athletic Club	•	•	3rd	1st	1st	1st	2nd	1st	2nd	1st	1st	1st	1st	1st	1st	1st	1st	•	•	•	•	1st	1st	1st	1st	1st	1st	1st	22
New York City THC	New York City THC	•	•	•	•	2nd	•	•	•	•	•	•	•	•	•	•	•	•	•	1st	3rd	•	•	•	•	•	•	•	•	3
Ohio State University	Ohio State University	•	4th	10th	•	•	•	•	•	•	•	9th	11th	12th	•	•	•	•	•	•	•	•	•	•	•	•	•	•	•	5
Rock THC	Rock THC	•	•	•	•	•	•	•	•	•	•	•	•	•	•	•	9th	10th	•	•	•	•	•	•	•	•	•	•	•	2
SSC New Jersey	SSC New Jersey	1st	2nd	2nd	•	•	3rd	•	•	7th	•	•	4th	6th	•	•	•	•	•	•	•	•	•	•	•	•	•	•	•	7
Team 2000	Team 2000	•	•	•	•	•	•	1st	•	•	•	•	•	•	•	•	•	•	•	•	•	•	•	•	•	•	•	•	•	1
University of Virginia THC	University of Virginia THC	•	•	•	•	•	•	•	•	•	•	•	•	•	•	•	•	•	•	•	•	•	•	•	•	•	•	4th	4th	1
USAFA Team Handball	USAFA Team Handball	•	3rd	•	•	•	•	•	•	•	•	•	•	•	•	•	•	•	•	•	•	•	•	•	•	•	•	•	•	1
West Point Team Handball	West Point (Black)	•	1st	1st	2nd	3rd	•	•	2nd	1st	6th	7th	7th	9th	9th	2nd	7th	•	3rd	2nd	1st	1st	3rd	•	•	4th	4th	2nd	•	21
West Point Team Handball	West Point Gold	•	7th	5th	•	•	•	•	•	9th	4th	3rd	6th	11th	11th	11th	12th	•	•	•	•	•	9th	•	•	•	•	•	•	12
Winnipegy THC	Winnipeg THC	•	•	•	•	•	2nd	•	•	•	•	•	•	•	•	•	•	•	•	•	•	•	•	•	•	•	•	•	•	1

== Women ==
=== Tournaments ===
Year	Final			3rd place match			Teams
Year	Champions	Score	Runners-up	3rd place	Score	4th place	Teams
2011; Details	Chicago Inter THC	28-15	Carolina THC	DC Diplomats THC	21-19	New York Athletic Club	8

== See also ==
- California Cup
