= 2015 USA Team Handball College Nationals – Women's Division =

2015 College Nationals - Women's Division
- Season: 2014–15
- Dates: 3 - 5. April 2015
- Champion: West Point Black
- Matches played: 6
- Goals scored: 135 (22.5 per match)
- Best Player: Ashton Wolf; West Point Black
- Top goalscorer: Ashton Wolf (28 goals); West Point Black
- Best goalkeeper: Melissa Wells; West Point Black
- All statistics correct as of 2018-02-03.

The 2015 College Nationals was the 20th Women's College Nationals. The College Nationals was a team handball tournament to determine the College National Champion from 2015 from the US.

== Venues ==
The championship was played at two venues at the Auburn University in Auburn, Alabama.

Auburn	Auburn University is located in the United States	Auburn
Beard–Eaves–Memorial Coliseum	Auburn University is located in the United States	Student Activities Center
Capacity: 10,500	Auburn University is located in the United States	Capacity: ?

== Modus ==
Location of 2015 USA Team Handball College Nationals Women's Division Teams
The bigger size of the West Point Logo show that they have two teams.

The three teams played first a round-robin contest. The two first-placed teams played against each other in a final. Because there were only three teams, each team played a game against the Women's Residency team but these were only friendly games.

== Results ==
=== Group stage ===
Team	Pld	W	D	L	GF	GA	GD	Pts
West Point Black	3	3	0	0	66	13	+53	6
University of North Carolina	4	2	0	2	33	47	−14	4
West Point Gold	3	0	0	3	14	53	−39	0

3 April 2016; 18:00	West Point Gold	7-9	University of North Carolina	Beard–Eaves–Memorial Coliseum, Auburn University
3 April 2016; 18:00			Morgan 4	Beard–Eaves–Memorial Coliseum, Auburn University

3 April 2016; 20:00	University of North Carolina	6-17	West Point Black	Beard–Eaves–Memorial Coliseum, Auburn University
3 April 2016; 20:00			Davis 6	Beard–Eaves–Memorial Coliseum, Auburn University

4 April 2016; 8:00	West Point Black	30-3	West Point Gold	Beard–Eaves–Memorial Coliseum, Auburn University
4 April 2016; 8:00	Wolf 8			Beard–Eaves–Memorial Coliseum, Auburn University

4 April 2016; 11:00	University of North Carolina	14-4	West Point Gold	Student Activities Center, Auburn University
4 April 2016; 11:00	Morgan 8			Student Activities Center, Auburn University

4 April 2016; 13:00	West Point Black	19-4	University of North Carolina	Beard–Eaves–Memorial Coliseum, Auburn University
4 April 2016; 13:00	Wolf, Moody 5			Beard–Eaves–Memorial Coliseum, Auburn University

=== Final ===
5 April 2016; 12:00	West Point Black	18-4	University of North Carolina	Beard–Eaves–Memorial Coliseum, Auburn University
5 April 2016; 12:00	Wolf 7			Beard–Eaves–Memorial Coliseum, Auburn University

=== Residency games ===
4 April 2016; 8:00	University of North Carolina	6-16	Women's Residency	Student Activities Center, Auburn University
4 April 2016; 8:00			4 player's 3	Student Activities Center, Auburn University

4 April 2016; 11:00	West Point Black	15-12	Women's Residency	Beard–Eaves–Memorial Coliseum, Auburn University
4 April 2016; 11:00	Wolf 6			Beard–Eaves–Memorial Coliseum, Auburn University

4 April 2016; 13:00	West Point Gold	7-32	Women's Residency	Student Activities Center, Auburn University
4 April 2016; 13:00			Levinkind 10	Student Activities Center, Auburn University

== Final ranking ==
Rank	Team
1st place, gold medalist(s)	West Point Black
2nd place, silver medalist(s)	University of North Carolina
3rd place, bronze medalist(s)	West Point Gold

== Awards ==
Most Valuable Player:	Ashton Wolf	West Point Black
Most Valuable Goalkeeper:	Melissa Wells	West Point Black
Top Scorer:	Ashton Wolf	West Point Black

== Top scorers ==
Record

Rank	Name	Goals	Games	Average	Team
1st place, gold medalist(s)	Ashton Wolf	28	5	5.6	West Point Black
2nd place, silver medalist(s)	Camille Morgan	19	6	3.17	University of North Carolina
2nd place, silver medalist(s)	Dana Robertson	19	5	3.8	West Point Black
4	Virginia Phillips	15	5	3	West Point Black
4	Rachael Tevis	15	6	2.5	University of North Carolina
6	Cora Moody	14	5	2.8	West Point Black
7	Dajah Davis	13	5	2.6	West Point Black
8	Brianna Sharkey	6	5	1.2	West Point Black
9	Lindsay Kiernan	5	3	1.67	West Point Gold
9	Clara Pitts	5	3	1.67	West Point Gold
9	Devon Biller	5	6	0.83	University of North Carolina

== All-Tournament Team ==
Pivot
Cora Moody
West Point Black
6th Top Scorer
Center Back
Left Back	Ashton Wolf	Right Back
Camille Morgan	West Point Black	Clara Pitts
UNC	Most Valuable Player &	West Point Gold
2nd Top Scorer	Top Scorer	9th Top Scorer
Left Wing	Goalkeeper	Right Wing
Rachael Tevis	Melissa Wells	Lindsay Kiernan
UNC	West Point Black	West Point Gold
4th Top Scorer	Most Valuable Goalkeeper	9th Top Scorer
