= 2019 USA Team Handball College Nationals – Men's Division =

2019 College Nationals - Men's Division
- Season: 2018–19
- Dates: 26 - 28. April 2019
- Champion: West Point Black
- Matches played: 19
- Goals scored: 901 (47.42 per match)
- Best Player: Kednrick Thomas (West Point Black)
- Top goalscorer: William Kennedy (46 goals) (Texas A&M University)
- Best goalkeeper: Jordan Wenske (Texas A&M University)
- All statistics correct as of 2019-04-22.

The 2019 College Nationals was the 24th Men's College Nationals. The College Nationals was a team handball tournament to determine the College National Champion from 2019 from the US.

== Venues ==
The championship was played at two venues at the University of North Carolina at Chapel Hill in Chapel Hill, North Carolina.

Chapel Hill	2019 USA Team Handball College Nationals – Men's Division is located in the United States	Chapel Hill
Fetzer Hall	2019 USA Team Handball College Nationals – Men's Division is located in the United States	Fetzer B
Capacity: ?	2019 USA Team Handball College Nationals – Men's Division is located in the United States	Capacity: ?

== Draw ==
Location of 2019 USA Team Handball College Nationals Men's Division Teams
The bigger size of the West Point shows that they have two teams.

The seeding was based on the USA Men's Top 5 College Rankings from March.

The 4th ranked team West Virginia University was not able to play at the college nationals. Because of there finals.

=== Seeding ===
Pot 1	Pot 2	Pot 3	Pot 4	Pot 5
West Point Black (1)	University of North Carolina (2); Ohio State University (3)	Air Force Academy (5)	University of Virginia (NR); West Point Gold (NR)	Texas A&M University (NV)

(NR=Not ranked; NV=No votes)

The two teams of pot 1 and 5 were placed in group A the team in pot 3 in group B.

The other teams were placed in group A or B.

== Modus ==
The seven teams are split in two groups A (4 teams) and B and will play first a round robin. 2 × 25 min game time.

The first of group A have a bye in the quarterfinals. All others play a quarterfinal. 2 × 25 min game time.

The winners of the quarterfinals plays the semis. 2 × 30 min game time. 2 × 25 min game time.

The three losers of the quarters plays a round robin for the places seven to five. 2 × 25 min game time.

The losers of the semis play a small final. 2 × 30 min game time.

The winners of the semis play the final. 2 × 30 min game time.

== Results ==
=== Group stage ===
==== Group A ====
Team	Pld	W	D	L	GF	GA	GD	Pts
West Point Black (1)	3	3	0	0	89	53	+36	6
University of North Carolina (2)	3	2	0	1	75	70	+5	4
Texas A&M University (NV)	3	1	0	2	73	78	−5	2
University of Virginia (NR)	3	0	0	3	54	90	−36	0

26 April 2019; 16:00 (UTC-4)	University of North Carolina	29 - 19	University of Virginia	Fetzer B, University of North Carolina
26 April 2019; 16:00 (UTC-4)		Report		Fetzer B, University of North Carolina

26 April 2019; 16:00 (UTC-4)	Texas A&M University	18 - 32	West Point Black	Fetzer Hall, University of North Carolina
26 April 2019; 16:00 (UTC-4)		Report		Fetzer Hall, University of North Carolina

26 April 2019; 18:30 (UTC-4)	Texas A&M University	32 - 18	University of Virginia	Fetzer B, University of North Carolina
26 April 2019; 18:30 (UTC-4)		Report		Fetzer B, University of North Carolina

26 April 2019; 18:30 (UTC-4)	West Point Black	28 - 18	University of North Carolina	Fetzer Hall, University of North Carolina
26 April 2019; 18:30 (UTC-4)		Report		Fetzer Hall, University of North Carolina

27 April 2019; 19:15 (UTC-4)	University of Virginia	17 - 29	West Point Black	Fetzer Hall, University of North Carolina
27 April 2019; 19:15 (UTC-4)		Report		Fetzer Hall, University of North Carolina

27 April 2019; 10:30 (UTC-4)	Texas A&M University	23 - 28	University of North Carolina	Fetzer B, University of North Carolina
27 April 2019; 10:30 (UTC-4)		Report		Fetzer B, University of North Carolina

==== Group B ====
Team	Pld	W	D	L	GF	GA	GD	Pts
Air Force Academy (5)	2	2	0	0	55	38	+17	4
West Point Gold (NR)	2	1	0	1	45	41	+4	2
Ohio State University (3)	2	0	0	2	36	57	−21	0

26 April 2019; 19:45 (UTC-4)	Air Force Academy	22 - 21	West Point Gold	Fetzer Hall, University of North Carolina
26 April 2019; 19:45 (UTC-4)		Report		Fetzer Hall, University of North Carolina

27 April 2019; 8:00 (UTC-4)	West Point Gold	24 - 19	Ohio State University	Fetzer B, University of North Carolina
27 April 2019; 8:00 (UTC-4)		Report		Fetzer B, University of North Carolina

27 April 2019; 10:30 (UTC-4)	Air Force Academy	33 - 17	Ohio State University	Fetzer Hall, University of North Carolina
27 April 2019; 10:30 (UTC-4)		Report		Fetzer Hall, University of North Carolina

=== Championship ===
Quarterfinals
B2	West Point Gold	22
A3	Texas A&M University	26
B1	Air Force Academy	32
A4	University of Virginia	15
B3	Ohio State University	12
A2	University of North Carolina	32

Semifinals
A1	West Point Black	21
A3	Texas A&M University	16
B1	Air Force Academy	17
A2	University of North Carolina	20

Finals
A1	West Point Black	29
A2	University of North Carolina	24
Third place
A3	Texas A&M University	32
B1	Air Force Academy	34

==== Quarterfinals ====
27 April 2019; 13:00 (UTC-4)	Ohio State University	12 - 32	University of North Carolina	Fetzer Hall, University of North Carolina
27 April 2019; 13:00 (UTC-4)		Report		Fetzer Hall, University of North Carolina

27 April 2019; 14:15 (UTC-4)	West Point Gold	22 - 26	Texas A&M University	Fetzer B, University of North Carolina
27 April 2019; 14:15 (UTC-4)		Report		Fetzer B, University of North Carolina

27 April 2019; 14:15 (UTC-4)	Air Force Academy	32 - 15	University of Virginia	Fetzer Hall, University of North Carolina
27 April 2019; 14:15 (UTC-4)		Report		Fetzer Hall, University of North Carolina

==== Semifinals ====
27 April 2019; 18:00 (UTC-4)	West Point Black	21 - 16	Texas A&M University	Fetzer Hall, University of North Carolina
27 April 2019; 18:00 (UTC-4)		Report		Fetzer Hall, University of North Carolina

27 April 2019; 19:15 (UTC-4)	Air Force Academy	17 - 20	University of North Carolina	Fetzer Hall, University of North Carolina
27 April 2019; 19:15 (UTC-4)		Report		Fetzer Hall, University of North Carolina

==== Small Final ====
28 April 2019; 11:30 (UTC-4)	Texas A&M University	32 - 34	Air Force Academy	Fetzer Hall, University of North Carolina
28 April 2019; 11:30 (UTC-4)		Report		Fetzer Hall, University of North Carolina

==== Final ====
28 April 2019; 13:00 (UTC-4)	West Point Black	29 - 24	University of North Carolina	Fetzer Hall, University of North Carolina
28 April 2019; 13:00 (UTC-4)		Report		Fetzer Hall, University of North Carolina

=== Placement Games ===
Team	Pld	W	D	L	GF	GA	GD	Pts
West Point Gold	2	2	0	0	53	42	+11	4
University of Virginia	2	1	0	1	49	52	−3	2
Ohio State University	2	0	0	2	40	48	−8	0

27 April 2019; 19:15 (UTC-4)	Ohio State University	22 - 25	University of Virginia	Fetzer B, University of North Carolina
27 April 2019; 19:15 (UTC-4)		Report		Fetzer B, University of North Carolina

28 April 2019; 8:00 (UTC-4)	West Point Gold	30 - 24	University of Virginia	Fetzer B, University of North Carolina
28 April 2019; 8:00 (UTC-4)		Report		Fetzer B, University of North Carolina

28 April 2019; 10:30 (UTC-4)	West Point Gold	23 - 18	Ohio State University	Fetzer B, University of North Carolina
28 April 2019; 10:30 (UTC-4)		Report		Fetzer B, University of North Carolina

== Final ranking ==
Rank	Team
1st place, gold medalist(s)	West Point Black (1)
2nd place, silver medalist(s)	University of North Carolina (2)
3rd place, bronze medalist(s)	Air Force Academy (5)
4	Texas A&M University (NV)
5	West Point Gold (NR)
6	University of Virginia (NR)
7	Ohio State University (3)

== Awards ==
Most Valuable Player:	Kednrick Thomas	West Point Black
Most Valuable Goalkeeper:	Jordan Wenske	Texas A&M University
Top Scorer:	William Kennedy (46 goals)	Texas A&M University
