= 2002 USA Team Handball College Nationals – Women's Division =

2002 College Nationals - Women's Division
- Season: 2001–02
- Dates: 1 - 3. March 2002
- Champion: West Point Black
- Matches played: 6
- Goals scored: 121 (20.17 per match)
- Best Player: Karolyn Miller; West Point Black
- Top goalscorer: Jennifer Smith (18 goals); West Point Black
- Best goalkeeper: Kim Johnson; West Point Black
- All statistics correct as of 2018-03-29.

The 2002 College Nationals was the 7th Women's College Nationals. The College Nationals was a team handball tournament to determined the College National Champion from 2002 from the US.

== Venues ==
The championship was played at the Furman University in Greenville, South Carolina.

Location of the Furman University

== Modus ==
Location of 2002 USA Team Handball College Nationals Women's Division Teams
The bigger size of the West Point Logo show that they have two teams.

The three teams played a round roubin.

== Results ==
=== Group stage ===
Team	Pld	W	D	L	GF	GA	GD	Pts
West Point Black	4	3	0	1	63	25	+38	6
University of North Carolina	4	3	0	1	37	42	−5	6
West Point Gold	4	0	0	4	21	54	−33	0

== Final ranking ==
Rank	Team
1st place, gold medalist(s)	West Point Black
2nd place, silver medalist(s)	University of North Carolina
3rd place, bronze medalist(s)	West Point Gold

== Awards ==
Most Valuable Player:	Karolyn Miller	West Point Black
Most Valuable Goalkeeper:	Kim Johnson	West Point Black
Top Scorer:	Jennifer Smith	West Point Black

== Top scorers ==
Record

Rank	Name	Goals	Games	Average	Team
1st place, gold medalist(s)	Jennifer Smith	18	4	4.5	West Point Black
2nd place, silver medalist(s)	Renee Ramsey	13	4	3.25	West Point Black

== All-Tournament Team ==
Kate Hart	University of North Carolina
Janet Reihner	West Point Gold
Sunny Chen	West Point Black
Kate Copeland	University of North Carolina
Kate Easler	University of North Carolina
Jennifer Smith	West Point Black	Top Scorer
Jennie Choi	West Point Gold
