= 2003 USA Team Handball College Nationals – Women's Division =

2003 College Nationals - Women's Division
- Season: 2002–03
- Dates: 28 - 30. March 2003
- Champion: West Point Black
- Matches played: 14
- Goals scored: 201 (14.36 per match)
- Best Player: Renee Ramsey; West Point Black
- Top goalscorer: Renee Ramsey (24 goals); West Point Black
- Best goalkeeper: Andrea Leaman; West Point Black
- All statistics correct as of 2018-05-01.

The 2003 College Nationals was the 8th Women's College Nationals. The College Nationals was a team handball tournament to determined the College National Champion from 2003 from the US.

== Venues ==
The championship was played at two venues at the Furman University in Greenville, South Carolina.

Greenville	2003 USA Team Handball College Nationals – Women's Division is located in the United States	Greenville
Timmons Arena	2003 USA Team Handball College Nationals – Women's Division is located in the United States	Physical Activities Center
Capacity: 4,000	2003 USA Team Handball College Nationals – Women's Division is located in the United States	Capacity: ?

== Modus ==
Location of 2003 USA Team Handball College Nationals Women's Division Teams
The bigger size of the West Point Logo show that they have two teams.

The five teams played first a round robin.

The first plays against the 4th and 2nd against the 3rd of the Group stage the semis.

The losers of the semis play a small final.

The winners of the semis play the final.

== Results ==
=== Group stage ===
Team	Pld	W	D	L	GF	GA	GD	Pts
Furman University	4	3	1	0	50	22	+28	7
West Point Black	4	3	1	0	41	18	+23	7
Virginia Commonwealth University	4	2	0	2	25	24	+1	4
University of North Carolina	4	1	0	3	20	43	−23	2
West Point Gold	4	0	0	4	10	39	−29	0

28 March 2003; 18:00 (UTC-5)	West Point Black	7-7	Furman University	Timmons Arena, Furman University

28 March 2003; 19:00 (UTC-5)	University of North Carolina	6-4	West Point Gold	Timmons Arena, Furman University

28 March 2003; 21:00 (UTC-5)	West Point Black	9-4	Virginia Commonwealth University	Timmons Arena, Furman University

29 March 2003; 8:00 (UTC-5)	West Point Gold	2-17	Furman University	Timmons Arena, Furman University

29 March 2003; 9:00 (UTC-5)	University of North Carolina	3-7	Virginia Commonwealth University	Physical Activities Center, Furman University

29 March 2003; 11:00 (UTC-5)	West Point Black	9-2	West Point Gold	Physical Activities Center, Furman University

29 March 2003; 12:00 (UTC-5)	University of North Carolina	6-16	Furman University	Physical Activities Center, Furman University

29 March 2003; 14:00 (UTC-5)	West Point Gold	2-7	Virginia Commonwealth University	Physical Activities Center, Furman University

29 March 2003; 15:00 (UTC-5)	West Point Black	16-5	University of North Carolina	Timmons Arena, Furman University

29 March 2003; 17:00 (UTC-5)	Furman University	10-7	Virginia Commonwealth University	Timmons Arena, Furman University

=== Championship ===
Semifinals
GS1	Furman University	8
GS4	University of North Carolina	8
GS2	West Point Black	4
GS3	Virginia Commonwealth University	2

Final
GS1	Furman University	10
GS2	West Point Black	11
Small Final
GS4	University of North Carolina	3
GS3	Virginia Commonwealth University	10

==== Semifinals ====
29 March 2003; 20:00 (UTC-5)	Furman University	8-7	University of North Carolina	Timmons Arena, Furman University

29 March 2003; 20:00 (UTC-5)	West Point Black	4-2	Virginia Commonwealth University	Physical Activities Center, Furman University

==== Small Final ====
30 March 2003; 9:30 (UTC-4)	University of North Carolina	3 - 10	Virginia Commonwealth University	Physical Activities Center, Furman University

==== Final ====
30 March 2003; 11:00 (UTC-4)	Furman University	10-11	West Point Black	Timmons Arena, Furman University

== Final ranking ==
Rank	Team
1st place, gold medalist(s)	West Point Black
2nd place, silver medalist(s)	Furman University
3rd place, bronze medalist(s)	Virginia Commonwealth University
4	University of North Carolina
5	West Point Gold

== Awards ==
Most Valuable Player:	Renee Ramsey	West Point Black
Most Valuable Goalkeeper:	Andrea Leaman	West Point Black
Top Scorer:	Renee Ramsey	West Point Black

== Top scorers ==
Record

Rank	Name	Goals	Games	Average	Team
1st place, gold medalist(s)	Renee Ramsey	24	6	4	West Point Black
2nd place, silver medalist(s)	Noelle Grosso	18	6	3	Virginia Commonwealth University
3rd place, bronze medalist(s)	Katie Easler	16	6	2.67	University of North Carolina
3rd place, bronze medalist(s)	Morgan Jones	16	6	2.67	Furman University
5	Jacqueline Bishop	15	6	2.5	Furman University
6	Sissy Salem	10	6	1.67	Furman University
6	Joanna Vivas	10	6	1.67	Furman University
8	Michelle Rackers	9	6	1.5	University of North Carolina
8	Sarah Schmidt	9	6	1.5	Virginia Commonwealth University
10	Ashley Hannifin	7	6	1.17	Furman University
10	Amy Kemp	7	6	1.17	West Point Black
10	Jordan Shireman	7	6	1.17	West Point Black

== All-Tournament Team ==
Amanda Worden	Furman University
Sissy Salem	Furman University	6th Top Scorer
Brandi Record	West Point Black	13th Top Scorer
Jacqueline Bishop	Furman University	5th Top Scorer
Katie Easler	University of North Carolina	3rd Top Scorer
Morgan Jones	Furman University	3rd Top Scorer
Noelle Grosso	Virginia Commonwealth University	2nd Top Scorer
