= 2001 USA Team Handball College Nationals – Women's Division =

2001 College Nationals - Women's Division
- Season: 2000-01
- Dates: 19 - 22. April 2001
- Champion: West Point Gold
- Best Player: Jennifer Smith; West Point Gold
- Top goalscorer: Jennifer Smith (17 goals); West Point Gold
- Best goalkeeper: Kim Johnson; West Point Black
- All statistics correct as of 2018-04-29.

Location of 2001 USA Team Handball College Nationals Women's Division Teams
The bigger size of the West Point shows that they have two teams.

The 2001 College Nationals was the 6th Women's College Nationals. The College Nationals was a team handball tournament to determined the College National Champion from 2000 from the US.

== Venues ==
The championship was played in Atlanta.

Location of Atlanta

== Final ranking ==
Rank	Team
1st place, gold medalist(s)	West Point Gold
2nd place, silver medalist(s)	West Point Black
3rd place, bronze medalist(s)	Lander University

== Awards ==
Most Valuable Player:	Kim Johnson	West Point Black
Most Valuable Goalkeeper:	Jennifer Smith	West Point Gold
Top Scorer:	Jennifer Smith	West Point Gold

== Top Scorers ==
Rank	Name	Goals	Team
1st place, gold medalist(s)	Jennifer Smith	17	West Point Gold
2nd place, silver medalist(s)	Deisha Moss	13	Lander University
3rd place, bronze medalist(s)	Sarah Biggerstaff	11	West Point Black
4	Jennifer Agnew	10	West Point Gold
5	Jackie Montalban	9	West Point Black
