= 2000 USA Team Handball College Nationals – Women's Division =

2000 College Nationals - Women's Division
- Season: 1999-00
- Dates: 10 - 12. March 2000
- Champion: West Point Black
- Best Player: Sara Biggerstaff; West Point Black
- Top goalscorer: Sara Biggerstaff (14 goals); West Point Black
- Best goalkeeper: Andrea Leamann; West Point Black
- All statistics correct as of 2018-02-10.

Location of 2000 USA Team Handball College Nationals Women's Division Teams
The bigger size of the West Point shows that they have two teams.

The 2000 College Nationals was the 5th Women's College Nationals. The College Nationals was a team handball tournament to determined the College National Champion from 2000 from the US.

== Venues ==
The championship was played at two venues at the University of North Carolina at Chapel Hill in Chapel Hill, North Carolina.

Location of University of North Carolina at Chapel Hill

== Final ranking ==
Rank	Team
1st place, gold medalist(s)	West Point Black
2nd place, silver medalist(s)	Furman University
3rd place, bronze medalist(s)	West Point Gold

== Awards ==
Most Valuable Player:	Sara Biggerstaff	West Point Black
Most Valuable Goalkeeper:	Andrea Leamann	West Point Black
Top Scorer:	Sara Biggerstaff	West Point Black

== Top Scorers ==
Rank	Name	Goals	Team
1st place, gold medalist(s)	Sara Biggerstaff	14	West Point Black
2nd place, silver medalist(s)	Jordan Lycan	10	Furman University
3rd place, bronze medalist(s)	Beth Reuschel	8	Furman University
4	Meghann Sullivan	7	West Point Black
5	Kari Brizius	6	West Point Black

== All-Tournament Team ==
Jordan Lycan	Furman University	2nd Top Scorer
Amy Lowry	Furman University
Susan Woo	West Point Gold
Sunny Chen	West Point Black
Jacquelyn Messel	West Point Black
Carolyn Egan	Furman University
Melissa Hunn	Furman University
