= 2007 USA Team Handball College Nationals – Men's Division =

2007 College Nationals- Men's Division
- Season: 2006–07
- Champion: West Point Black
- Matches played: 15
- Goals scored: 605 (40.33 per match)
- Best Player: Alex McGlynn; University of North Carolina
- Best goalkeeper: Keith Fine; West Point Black
- All statistics correct as of 2018-02-13.

The 2007 College Nationals was the 12th Men's College Nationals. The College Nationals was a team handball tournament to determined the College National Champion from 2007 from the US.

== Venues ==
The championship was played at one venues in Huntsville, Alabama.

Huntsville	Huntsville is located in the United States
Von Braun Convention Center	Huntsville is located in the United States
Capacity: ?	Huntsville is located in the United States

== Modus ==
Location of 2007 USA Team Handball College Nationals Men's Division Teams
The bigger size of the West Point and Air Force shows that they have two teams.

The four teams played a round-robin.

The third and fourth played a small final. The first and second a final.

== Results ==
=== Group stage ===
Team	Pld	W	D	L	GF	GA	GD	Pts
University of North Carolina	4	4	0	0	95	71	+24	8
West Point Black	4	3	0	1	116	79	+37	6
Air Force Academy B	4	2	0	2	115	101	+14	4
Air Force Academy A	4	1	0	3	109	131	−22	2
West Point Gold	4	0	0	4	77	130	−53	0

West Point Black	36-18	West Point Gold	Von Braun Convention Center, Huntsville

University of North Carolina	19-18	Air Force Academy B	Von Braun Convention Center, Huntsville

Air Force Academy A	33-23	West Point Gold	Von Braun Convention Center, Huntsville

West Point Black	28-19	Air Force Academy B	Von Braun Convention Center, Huntsville

University of North Carolina	28-15	West Point Gold	Von Braun Convention Center, Huntsville

Air Force Academy A	20-29	University of North Carolina	Von Braun Convention Center, Huntsville

West Point Gold	21-33	Air Force Academy B	Von Braun Convention Center, Huntsville

West Point Black	34-23	Air Force Academy A	Von Braun Convention Center, Huntsville

Air Force Academy B	45-33	Air Force Academy A	Von Braun Convention Center, Huntsville

West Point Black	18-19	University of North Carolina	Von Braun Convention Center, Huntsville

=== Championship ===
==== Small Final ====
Air Force Academy B	34-24	Air Force Academy A	Von Braun Convention Center, Huntsville

==== Final ====
West Point Black	20-15	University of North Carolina	Von Braun Convention Center, Huntsville

== Final ranking ==
Rank	Team
1st place, gold medalist(s)	West Point Black
2nd place, silver medalist(s)	University of North Carolina
3rd place, bronze medalist(s)	Air Force Academy B
4	Air Force Academy A
5	West Point Gold

== Awards ==
Most Valuable Player:	Alex McGlynn	University of North Carolina
Most Valuable Goalkeeper:	Keith Fine	West Point Black

== All-Tournament Team ==
Alex McGlynn	University of North Carolina	Most Valuable Player
Carson Chun	Air Force Academy B
Ty Bowen	Air Force Academy A
Brian Walsh	West Point Black
Connor Lewis	West Point Gold
Danny Kimmich	Air Force Academy B
Keith Fine	West Point Black	Most Valuable Goalkeeper
