= Flight 816 =

Flight 816 may refer to

- Pan Am Flight 816, crashed on 22 July 1973
- Knight Air Flight 816, crashed on 24 May 1995
