= 2003 USA Team Handball College Nationals – Men's Division =

2003 College Nationals - Men's Division
- Season: 2002–03
- Dates: 28–30 March 2003
- Champion: West Point Black
- Matches played: 32
- Goals scored: 738 (23.06 per match)
- Best Player: K.C. Bennett; West Point Black
- Top goalscorer: Kevin Williams (41 goals); University of North Carolina
- Best goalkeeper: David Thompson; University of Alabama
- All statistics correct as of 2018-05-19.

The 2003 College Nationals was the 8th Men's College Nationals. The College Nationals was a team handball tournament to determine the College National Champion from 2003 from the US.

== Venues ==
The championship was played at two venues at the Furman University in Greenville, South Carolina.

Greenville	2003 USA Team Handball College Nationals – Men's Division is located in the United States	Greenville
Timmons Arena	2003 USA Team Handball College Nationals – Men's Division is located in the United States	Physical Activities Center
Capacity: 4,000	2003 USA Team Handball College Nationals – Men's Division is located in the United States	Capacity: ?

== Modus ==
Location of 2003 USA Team Handball College Nationals Men's Division Teams
The bigger size of the West Point Logo show that they have two teams.

The 9 teams were divided into two groups.

In the Group stage every group had a round-robin. The best two teams per group qualified for the semifinals.

The fifth placed team of group A played no more games and was ranked 9th.

The third and fourth per group played a 5th - 8th place bracket.

The losers from the semis played a small final and the winners the final.

== Results ==
=== Group stage ===
==== Group A ====
Team	Pld	W	D	L	GF	GA	GD	Pts
University of North Carolina	4	4	0	0	77	39	+38	8
West Point Gold	4	3	0	1	67	56	+11	6
University of Memphis	4	1	1	2	53	50	+3	3
University of Minnesota	4	1	0	3	47	81	−34	2
Purdue University	4	0	1	3	59	77	−18	1

28 March 2003; 19:00 (UTC-5)	West Point Gold	20-11	University of Minnesota	Physical Activities Center, Furman University

28 March 2003; 20:00 (UTC-5)	University of North Carolina	13-10	University of Memphis	Timmons Arena, Furman University

28 March 2003; 21:00 (UTC-5)	West Point Gold	27-18	Purdue University	Physical Activities Center, Furman University

29 March 2003; 8:00 (UTC-5)	University of North Carolina	27-9	University of Minnesota	Physical Activities Center, Furman University

29 March 2003; 9:00 (UTC-5)	University of Memphis	13-13	Purdue University	Timmons Arena, Furman University

29 March 2003; 11:00 (UTC-5)	West Point Gold	7-16	University of North Carolina	Timmons Arena, Furman University

29 March 2003; 12:00 (UTC-5)	University of Memphis	19-11	University of Minnesota	Physical Activities Center, Furman University

29 March 2003; 14:00 (UTC-5)	Purdue University	15-16	University of Minnesota	Timmons Arena, Furman University

29 March 2003; 16:00 (UTC-5)	West Point Gold	13-11	University of Memphis	Timmons Arena, Furman University

29 March 2003; 16:00 (UTC-5)	University of North Carolina	21-13	Purdue University	Physical Activities Center, Furman University

==== Group B ====
Team	Pld	W	D	L	GF	GA	GD	Pts
University of Alabama	3	2	1	0	52	38	+14	5
West Point Black	3	2	0	1	55	37	+18	4
Benedict College	3	1	1	1	41	46	−5	3
Georgia State University	3	0	0	3	30	57	−27	0

28 March 2003; 18:00 (UTC-5)	West Point Black	15-17	University of Alabama	Physical Activities Center, Furman University

28 March 2003; 20:00 (UTC-5)	Georgia State University	10-18	Benedict College	Physical Activities Center, Furman University

29 March 2003; 10:00 (UTC-5)	Georgia State University	8-20	University of Alabama	Timmons Arena, Furman University

29 March 2003; 10:00 (UTC-5)	West Point Black	21-8	Benedict College	Physical Activities Center, Furman University

29 March 2003; 13:00 (UTC-5)	West Point Black	19-12	Georgia State University	Timmons Arena, Furman University

29 March 2003; 13:00 (UTC-5)	Benedict College	15-15	University of Alabama	Physical Activities Center, Furman University

=== Championship ===
Semifinals
A1	University of North Carolina	16
B2	West Point Black	17
A2	West Point Gold	21
B1	University of Alabama	19

Final
B2	West Point Black	20
A2	West Point Gold	19
Small Final
A1	University of North Carolina	21
B1	University of Alabama	17

==== Semifinals ====
29 March 2003; 21:00 (UTC-5)	University of North Carolina	16-17	West Point Black	Timmons Arena, Furman University

29 March 2003; 21:00 (UTC-5)	West Point Gold	21-19	University of Alabama	Physical Activities Center, Furman University

==== Small Final ====
30 March 2003; 9:30 (UTC-4)	University of North Carolina	21 - 17	University of Alabama	Timmons Arena, Furman University

==== Final ====
30 March 2003; 12:30 (UTC-4)	West Point Black	20-19	West Point Gold	Timmons Arena, Furman University

=== Placement Games ===
5th–8th Semifinals
A3	University of Memphis	12
B4	Georgia State University	13
A4	University of Minnesota	16
B3	Benedict College	17

5th place
B4	Georgia State University	19
B3	Benedict College	22
7th place
A3	University of Memphis	0
A4	University of Minnesota	8

==== 5th–8th Semifinals ====
29 March 2003; 19:00 (UTC-5)	University of Memphis	12-13	Georgia State University	Timmons Arena, Furman University

29 March 2003; 19:00 (UTC-5)	University of Minnesota	16-17	Benedict College	Physical Activities Center, Furman University

==== 7th place game ====
30 March 2003; 8:00 (UTC-4)	University of Memphis	0 - 8	University of Minnesota	Physical Activities Center, Furman University

==== 5th place game ====
30 March 2003; 8:00 (UTC-4)	Georgia State University	19-22	Benedict College	Timmons Arena, Furman University

== Final ranking ==
Rank	Team
1st place, gold medalist(s)	West Point Black
2nd place, silver medalist(s)	West Point Gold
3rd place, bronze medalist(s)	University of North Carolina
4	University of Alabama
5	Benedict College
6	Georgia State University
7	University of Minnesota
8	University of Memphis
9	Purdue University

== Awards ==
Most Valuable Player:	K.C. Bennett	West Point Black
Most Valuable Goalkeeper:	David Thompson	University of Alabama
Top Scorer:	Kevin Williams	University of North Carolina

== Top scorers ==
Record

Rank	Name	Goals	Games	Average	Team
1st place, gold medalist(s)	Kevin Williams	41	6	6.83	University of North Carolina
2nd place, silver medalist(s)	Muris Lucarevic	34	6	5.67	University of Minnesota
3rd place, bronze medalist(s)	Joe Lamour	32	5	6.4	University of Alabama
4	Jasmin Nuhic	29	6	4.83	University of Memphis
4	Joanna Vivas	29	6	4.83	University of North Carolina
6	Scott Harr	27	6	4.5	West Point Gold
7	Goldie Harper	26	6	4.33	West Point Gold
8	Mike McCaman	23	4	5.75	Purdue University
9	Phil Smith	20	5	4	Benedict College
10	Troy Steffen	19	5	3.8	University of Alabama

== All-Tournament Team ==
Chris Collins	West Point Black16th Top Scorer
Joe Lamour	University of Alabama	3rd Top Scorer
Scott Harr	West Point Gold	6th Top Scorer
Goldie Harper	West Point Gold	7th Top Scorer
Kevin Williams	University of North Carolina	Top Scorer
Jasmin Nuhic	University of Memphis	4th Top Scorer
Muris Lucarevic	University of Minnesota	2nd Top Scorer
