= 2001 USA Team Handball College Nationals – Men's Division =

2001 College Nationals - Men's Division
- Season: 2000-01
- Dates: 19 - 22. April 2000
- Champion: West Point Black
- Best Player: Myles Bacon; University of North Carolina
- Top goalscorer: Joshua Ehmen (23 goals); Air Force Academy; Jason Schumpert (23 goals); Lander University
- Best goalkeeper: Pete Exline; West Point Black
- All statistics correct as of 2018-04-29.

Location of 2001 USA Team Handball College Nationals Men's Division Teams
The bigger size of the West Point and Georgia Tech shows that they have two teams.

The 2001 College Nationals was the 6th Men's College Nationals. The College Nationals was a team handball tournament to determined the College National Champion from 2001 from the US.

== Venues ==
The championship was played in Atlanta.

Location of Atlanta

== Results ==
=== Small Final ===
Middle Georgia State University	Middle Georgia State won	West Point Gold

=== Final ===
West Point Black	26-15	University of North Carolina

== Final ranking ==
Rank	Team
1st place, gold medalist(s)	West Point Black
2nd place, silver medalist(s)	University of North Carolina
3rd place, bronze medalist(s)	Middle Georgia State University
4	West Point Gold
5	Air Force Academy
6	Lander University
7	Georgia State University
8	Georgia Tech Gold
9	Georgia Tech White

== Awards ==
Most Valuable Player:	Myles Bacon	University of North Carolina
Most Valuable Goalkeeper:	Pete Exline	West Point Black
Top Scorer:	Joshua Ehmen	Air Force Academy
Top Scorer:	Jason Schumpert	Lander University

== Top Scorers ==
Rank	Name	Goals	Team
1st place, gold medalist(s)	Joshua Ehmen	23	Air Force Academy
1st place, gold medalist(s)	Jason Schumpert	23	Lander University
3rd place, bronze medalist(s)	Ben Croxton	19	Middle Georgia State University
4	Myles Bacon	18	University of North Carolina
4	Brian Brennan	18	Georgia Tech Gold
