= 2002 USA Team Handball College Nationals – Men's Division =

2002 College Nationals - Men's Division
- Season: 2001-02
- Dates: 1 - 3. March 2002
- Champion: Air Force
- Best Player: Josh Ehman; Air Force
- Top goalscorer: Joe Lamour (37 goals); University of Alabama
- Best goalkeeper: David Schmitt; Air Force
- All statistics correct as of 2018-03-29.

Location of 2002 USA Team Handball College Nationals Men's Division Teams
The bigger size of the West Point and North Carolina shows that they have two teams.

The 2002 College Nationals was the 7th Men's College Nationals. The College Nationals was a team handball tournament to determined the College National Champion from 2002 from the US.

== Venues ==
The championship was played at the Furman University in Greenville, South Carolina.

Location of the Furman University

== Final ranking ==
Rank	Team
1st place, gold medalist(s)	Air Force Academy
2nd place, silver medalist(s)	West Point Black
3rd place, bronze medalist(s)	Middle Georgia State University
4	University of North Carolina
5	Georgia Institute of Technology
6	Benedict College
7	UNC Tar Heels
8	University of Memphis
9	University of Alabama
10	West Point Gold
11	Georgia State University

== Awards ==
Most Valuable Player:	Josh Ehman	Air Force
Most Valuable Goalkeeper:	David Schmitt	Air Force
Top Scorer:	Joe Lamour	University of Alabama

== Top Scorers ==
Record

Rank	Name	Goals	Team
1st place, gold medalist(s)	Joe Lamour	37	University of Alabama
2nd place, silver medalist(s)	Josh Ehman	35	Air Force
3rd place, bronze medalist(s)	Code Taylor	34	Air Force
4	Wade Sutton	33	UNC Tar Heels
5	Muris Lucarevic	28	University of Memphis
6	Salem Al-Dhaheri	24	Benedict College
6	Myles Bacon	24	University of North Carolina
6	Brian Brennan	24	Georgia Institute of Technology
6	Ben Croxton	24	
6	Darijan Suton	24	

== All-Tournament Team ==
Jon Tullos	West Point Black	19th Top Scorer
Cole Taylor	Air Force	3rd Top Scorer
Darijan Suton	Middle Georgia State University	6th Top Scorer
Myles Bacon	University of North Carolina	6th Top Scorer
Ben Croxton	Middle Georgia State University	6th Top Scorer
Joe Lamour	University of Alabama	Top Scorer
Kurtis Bennett	West Point Black
