= 2015 USA Team Handball College Nationals – Men's Division =

2015 College Nationals - Men's Division
- Season: 2014–15
- Dates: 3 - 5. April 2015
- Champion: West Point Black
- Matches played: 28
- Goals scored: 1,135 (40.54 per match)
- Best Player: Connor Holt; West Point Black
- Top goalscorer: Fabian Gubler (34 goals); Clemson University
- Best goalkeeper: David Brown; Air Force Academy
- All statistics correct as of 2018-02-03.

The 2015 College Nationals was the 20th Men's College Nationals. The College Nationals was a team handball tournament to determined the College National Champion from 2015 from the US.

== Venues ==
The championship was played at two venues at the Auburn University in Auburn, Alabama.

| Auburn | Auburn University is located in the United States | Auburn |
|---|---|---|
| Beard–Eaves–Memorial Coliseum | Auburn University is located in the United States | Student Activities Center |
| Capacity: 10,500 | Auburn University is located in the United States | Capacity: ? |

== Draw ==
Location of 2015 USA Team Handball College Nationals Men's Division Teams
The bigger size of the West Point and OSU Logo shows that they have two teams.

The draw for the men's was held on 26 March 2015 at 11:00 in Auburn. The seedings were based on the last College Nationals. As originator, Auburn was allowed to choose the group.

=== Seeding ===
| Pot 1 | Pot 2 | Pot 3 |
|---|---|---|
| West Point Black; University of North Carolina; Air Force Academy; Clemson University | The Ohio State University Scarlet; West Point Gold; Illinois State University; Texas A&M University | Auburn University; Miami University; University of Wisconsin–Milwaukee; The Ohio State University Grey |

== Modus ==
The 12 teams were split into four groups. The seeding were based on the last College Nationals.

In the Group stage every group had a round-robin. The best two teams per group were qualified for the quarterfinals.

The four last teams from the group stage played a 9th - 12th place bracket.

The losers from the quarterfinals played a 5th - 8th place bracket.

The winners from the quarterfinals were qualified for the semifinals.

The losers from the semis played a small final and the winners the final.

== Results ==
=== Group stage ===
==== Group A ====
| Team | Pld | W | D | L | GF | GA | GD | Pts |
|---|---|---|---|---|---|---|---|---|
| Auburn University | 2 | 2 | 0 | 0 | 40 | 28 | +12 | 4 |
| Clemson University | 2 | 1 | 0 | 1 | 44 | 30 | +14 | 2 |
| Illinois State University | 2 | 0 | 0 | 2 | 20 | 46 | −26 | 0 |

| 3 April 2016; 16:00 | Auburn University | 20-10 | Illinois State University | Beard–Eaves–Memorial Coliseum, Auburn University |
| 3 April 2016; 16:00 | 2 players 5 | | | Beard–Eaves–Memorial Coliseum, Auburn University |

| 3 April 2016; 19:00 | Illinois State University | 10-26 | Clemson University | Beard–Eaves–Memorial Coliseum, Auburn University |
| 3 April 2016; 19:00 | | | 2 players 7 | Beard–Eaves–Memorial Coliseum, Auburn University |

| 4 April 2016; 10:00 | Auburn University | 20-18 | Clemson University | Beard–Eaves–Memorial Coliseum, Auburn University |
| 4 April 2016; 10:00 | Mukendi 7 | | | Beard–Eaves–Memorial Coliseum, Auburn University |

==== Group B ====
| Team | Pld | W | D | L | GF | GA | GD | Pts |
|---|---|---|---|---|---|---|---|---|
| West Point Gold | 2 | 2 | 0 | 0 | 55 | 31 | +24 | 4 |
| Air Force Academy | 2 | 1 | 0 | 1 | 48 | 35 | +13 | 2 |
| University of Wisconsin–Milwaukee | 2 | 0 | 0 | 2 | 27 | 64 | −37 | 0 |

| 3 April 2016; 17:00 | Air Force Academy | 16-23 | West Point Gold | Beard–Eaves–Memorial Coliseum, Auburn University |
| 3 April 2016; 17:00 | | | Mondesir 7 | Beard–Eaves–Memorial Coliseum, Auburn University |

| 3 April 2016; 20:00 | West Point Gold | 32-15 | University of Wisconsin–Milwaukee | Student Activities Center, Auburn University |
| 3 April 2016; 20:00 | Mondesir 8 | | | Student Activities Center, Auburn University |

| 4 April 2016; 10:00 | University of Wisconsin–Milwaukee | 12-32 | Air Force Academy | Student Activities Center, Auburn University |
| 4 April 2016; 10:00 | | | Donlin 8 | Student Activities Center, Auburn University |

==== Group C ====
| Team | Pld | W | D | L | GF | GA | GD | Pts |
|---|---|---|---|---|---|---|---|---|
| University of North Carolina | 2 | 2 | 0 | 0 | 44 | 26 | +18 | 4 |
| Texas A&M University | 2 | 1 | 0 | 1 | 32 | 34 | −2 | 2 |
| The Ohio State University Grey | 2 | 0 | 0 | 2 | 24 | 40 | −16 | 0 |

| 3 April 2016; 18:00 | University of North Carolina | 21-15 | Texas A&M University | Student Activities Center, Auburn University |
| 3 April 2016; 18:00 | Caldwell 8 | | | Student Activities Center, Auburn University |

| 4 April 2016; 9:00 | Texas A&M University | 17-13 | The Ohio State University Grey | Student Activities Center, Auburn University |
| 4 April 2016; 9:00 | Delcini 8 | | | Student Activities Center, Auburn University |

| 4 April 2016; 12:00 | The Ohio State University Grey | 11-23 | University of North Carolina | Beard–Eaves–Memorial Coliseum, Auburn University |
| 4 April 2016; 12:00 | | | Gilbert 5 | Beard–Eaves–Memorial Coliseum, Auburn University |

==== Group D ====
| Team | Pld | W | D | L | GF | GA | GD | Pts |
|---|---|---|---|---|---|---|---|---|
| West Point Black | 2 | 2 | 0 | 0 | 60 | 36 | +24 | 4 |
| Miami University | 2 | 1 | 0 | 1 | 40 | 53 | −13 | 2 |
| The Ohio State University Scarlet | 2 | 0 | 0 | 2 | 33 | 44 | −11 | 0 |

| 3 April 2016; 19:00 | West Point Black | 25-15 | The Ohio State University Scarlet | Student Activities Center, Auburn University |
| 3 April 2016; 19:00 | Aten 7 | | | Student Activities Center, Auburn University |

| 4 April 2016; 9:00 | The Ohio State University Scarlet | 18-19 | Miami University | Beard–Eaves–Memorial Coliseum, Auburn University |
| 4 April 2016; 9:00 | | | Albasha 5 | Beard–Eaves–Memorial Coliseum, Auburn University |

| 4 April 2016; 12:00 | Miami University | 21-35 | West Point Black | Student Activities Center, Auburn University |
| 4 April 2016; 12:00 | | | Zeck 7 | Student Activities Center, Auburn University |

=== Championship ===
Quarterfinals
A1 | Auburn University | 15
C2 | Texas A&M University | 16
B1 | West Point Gold | 25
D2 | Miami University | 18
A2 | Clemson University | 17
C1 | University of North Carolina | 20
B2 | Air Force Academy | 17
D1 | West Point Black | 22

Semifinals
C2 | Texas A&M University | 16
B1 | West Point Gold | 18
C1 | University of North Carolina | 18
D1 | West Point Black | 32

Final
B1 | West Point Gold | 32
D1 | West Point Black | 35
Small Final
C2 | Texas A&M University | 13
C1 | University of North Carolina | 20

==== Quarterfinals ====
| 4 April 2016; 15:00 | Auburn University | 15-16 | Texas A&M University | Beard–Eaves–Memorial Coliseum, Auburn University |
| 4 April 2016; 15:00 | | | Delcini 8 | Beard–Eaves–Memorial Coliseum, Auburn University |

| 4 April 2016; 15:00 | Clemson University | 17-20 | University of North Carolina | Student Activities Center, Auburn University |
| 4 April 2016; 15:00 | | | 2 players 4 | Student Activities Center, Auburn University |

| 4 April 2016; 16:00 | West Point Gold | 25-18 | Miami University | Beard–Eaves–Memorial Coliseum, Auburn University |
| 4 April 2016; 16:00 | Mondesir 6 | | | Beard–Eaves–Memorial Coliseum, Auburn University |

| 4 April 2016; 16:00 | Air Force Academy | 17-22 | West Point Black | Student Activities Center, Auburn University |
| 4 April 2016; 16:00 | | | Cross 7 | Student Activities Center, Auburn University |

==== Semifinals ====
| 5 April 2016; 8:50 | Texas A&M University | 16-18 | West Point Gold | Beard–Eaves–Memorial Coliseum, Auburn University |
| 5 April 2016; 8:50 | | | Swett 7 | Beard–Eaves–Memorial Coliseum, Auburn University |

| 5 April 2016; 8:50 | University of North Carolina | 18-32 | West Point Black | Student Activities Center, Auburn University |
| 5 April 2016; 8:50 | | | Cross 7 | Student Activities Center, Auburn University |

==== Small Final ====
| 5 April 2016; 12:00 | Texas A&M University | 13-20 | University of North Carolina | Student Activities Center, Auburn University |
| 5 April 2016; 12:00 | | | Piasecki 5 | Student Activities Center, Auburn University |

==== Final ====
| 5 April 2016; 13:00 | West Point Gold | 32-35 | West Point Black | Beard–Eaves–Memorial Coliseum, Auburn University |
| 5 April 2016; 13:00 | | | Holt 11 | Beard–Eaves–Memorial Coliseum, Auburn University |

=== Placement Games ===
==== 5th–8th place bracket ====
5th–8th Semifinals
LQ1 | Auburn University | 16
LQ2 | Miami University | 17
LQ3 | Clemson University | 20
LQ4 | Air Force Academy | 29

5th place
LQ2 | Miami University | 20
LQ4 | Air Force Academy | 31
7th place
LQ1 | Auburn University | 13
LQ3 | Clemson University | 27

===== 5th–8th Semifinals =====
| 5 April 2016; 7:50 | Auburn University | 16-17 | Miami University | Beard–Eaves–Memorial Coliseum, Auburn University |
| 5 April 2016; 7:50 | | | Albasha 8 | Beard–Eaves–Memorial Coliseum, Auburn University |

| 5 April 2016; 7:50 | Clemson University | 20-29 | Air Force Academy | Student Activities Center, Auburn University |
| 5 April 2016; 7:50 | | | Murray 9 | Student Activities Center, Auburn University |

===== 7th place game =====
| 5 April 2016; 11:00 | Auburn University | 13-27 | Clemson University | Student Activities Center, Auburn University |
| 5 April 2016; 11:00 | | | Gubler 9 | Student Activities Center, Auburn University |

===== 5th place game =====
| 5 April 2016; 11:00 | Miami University | 20-31 | Air Force Academy | Beard–Eaves–Memorial Coliseum, Auburn University |
| 5 April 2016; 11:00 | | | Donlin 6 | Beard–Eaves–Memorial Coliseum, Auburn University |

==== 9th–12th place bracket ====
9th–12th Semifinals
A3 | Illinois State University | 26
C3 | The Ohio State University Grey | 24
B3 | University of Wisconsin–Milwaukee | 21
D3 | The Ohio State University Scarlet | 11

9th place
A3 | Illinois State University | 13
D3 | The Ohio State University Scarlet | 21
11th place
C3 | The Ohio State University Grey | 20
B3 | University of Wisconsin–Milwaukee | 25

===== 9th–12th Semifinals =====
| 4 April 2016; 14:00 | Illinois State University | 26-24 | The Ohio State University Grey | Beard–Eaves–Memorial Coliseum, Auburn University |
| 4 April 2016; 14:00 | Miner 7 | | | Beard–Eaves–Memorial Coliseum, Auburn University |

| 4 April 2016; 14:00 | University of Wisconsin–Milwaukee | 21-11 | The Ohio State University Scarlet | Student Activities Center, Auburn University |
| 4 April 2016; 14:00 | Fay 5 | | | Student Activities Center, Auburn University |

===== 11th place game =====
| 5 April 2016; 10:00 | The Ohio State University Grey | 20-25 | University of Wisconsin–Milwaukee | Student Activities Center, Auburn University |
| 5 April 2016; 10:00 | | | Fay 12 | Student Activities Center, Auburn University |

===== 9th place game =====
| 5 April 2016; 10:00 | Illinois State University | 13-21 | The Ohio State University Scarlet | Beard–Eaves–Memorial Coliseum, Auburn University |
| 5 April 2016; 10:00 | | | 2 players 5 | Beard–Eaves–Memorial Coliseum, Auburn University |

=== All-Star game ===
| 4 April 2016; 18:30 | Men's Residency | 20-20 | Collegiate All-Star Team | Student Activities Center, Auburn University |
| 4 April 2016; 18:30 | Chun 5 | | Donlin 6 | Student Activities Center, Auburn University |

== Final ranking ==
| Rank | Team |
|---|---|
| 1st place, gold medalist(s) | West Point Black |
| 2nd place, silver medalist(s) | West Point Gold |
| 3rd place, bronze medalist(s) | University of North Carolina |
| 4 | Texas A&M University |
| 5 | Air Force Academy |
| 6 | Miami University |
| 7 | Clemson University |
| 8 | Auburn University |
| 9 | The Ohio State University Scarlet |
| 10 | Illinois State University |
| 11 | University of Wisconsin–Milwaukee |
| 12 | The Ohio State University Grey |

== Awards ==
| Most Valuable Player: | Connor Holt | West Point Black |
| Most Valuable Goalkeeper: | David Brown | West Point Black |
| Top Scorer: | Fabian Gubler | Clemson University |

== Top scorers ==
| Record |

Source: When there is a tie by the goals the player with the better average was ranked first. When there was the same average the players have the same rank.

| Rank | Name | Goals | Games | Average | Team |
|---|---|---|---|---|---|
| 1st place, gold medalist(s) | Fabian Gubler | 34 | 5 | 6.8 | Clemson University |
| 2nd place, silver medalist(s) | Drew Donlin | 29 | 5 | 5.8 | Air Force Academy |
| 3rd place, bronze medalist(s) | Sebastian Fay | 28 | 4 | 7 | University of Wisconsin–Milwaukee |
| 4 | Ji Mondesir | 28 | 5 | 5.6 | West Point Gold |
| 4 | Hussain Albasha | 28 | 5 | 5.6 | Miami University |
| 6 | Ben Hollies | 27 | 4 | 6.75 | The Ohio State University Grey |
| 7 | Marco Delcini | 27 | 4 | 5.4 | Texas A&M University |
| 8 | Corinth Cross | 26 | 5 | 5.2 | West Point Black |
| 8 | Alec Zeck | 26 | 5 | 5.2 | West Point Black |
| 10 | Ethan Wallenius-Caldwell | 25 | 5 | 5 | University of North Carolina |
| 10 | Connor Holt | 25 | 5 | 5 | West Point Black |

== All-Star Team ==
| Coree Aten | West Point Black |
| A.D. Briggs | Auburn University |
| Nick Colaianni | University of North Carolina |
| Corinth Cross | West Point Black | 8th Top Scorer |
| Marco Delcini | Texas A&M University | 7th Top Scorer |
| Drew Donlin | Air Force Academy | 2nd Top Scorer |
| Sebastian Fay | University of Wisconsin–Milwaukee | 3rd Top Scorer |
| Fabian Gubler | Clemson University | 1st Top Scorer |
| Patrick Halladay | Auburn University |
| Connor Holt | West Point Black | Most Valuable Player |
| Forest Keller | West Point Gold | Goalkeeper |
| Christian McKenrick | West Point Black |
| Ross Miner | Illinois State University |
| Ji Mondesir | West Point Gold | 4th Top Scorer |
| Julian Orr | The Ohio State University | Goalkeeper |
| Jarod Roberts | Air Force Academy |
