= 2000 USA Team Handball College Nationals – Men's Division =

2000 College Nationals - Men's Division
- Season: 1999-00
- Dates: 10 - 12. March 2000
- Champion: West Point Black
- Best Player: Josh Soper; West Point Black
- Top goalscorer: Joshua Ehmen (43 goals); Air Force Academy
- Best goalkeeper: Pete Exline; West Point Gold
- All statistics correct as of 2018-02-10.

Location of 2000 USA Team Handball College Nationals Men's Division Teams
The bigger size of the West Point shows that they have two teams.

The 2000 College Nationals was the 5th Men's College Nationals. The College Nationals was a team handball tournament to determined the College National Champion from 2000 from the US.

== Venues ==
The championship was played at two venues at the University of North Carolina at Chapel Hill in Chapel Hill, North Carolina.

Location of University of North Carolina at Chapel Hill

== Results ==
=== Small Final ===
University of North Carolina	UNC wins	Georgia Southern University	University of North Carolina

=== Final ===
West Point Black	28-11	Air Force Academy	University of North Carolina

== Final ranking ==
Rank	Team
1st place, gold medalist(s)	West Point Black
2nd place, silver medalist(s)	Air Force Academy
3rd place, bronze medalist(s)	University of North Carolina
4	Georgia Southern University
5	West Point Gold
6	Middle Georgia State University
7	West Point Black
8	Furman University
9	Benedict College
10	Lander University
11	The Ohio State University

== Awards ==
Most Valuable Player:	Josh Soper	West Point Black
Most Valuable Goalkeeper:	Pete Exline	West Point Gold
Top Scorer:	Joshua Ehmen	Air Force Academy

== Top Scorers ==
Rank	Name	Goals	Team
1st place, gold medalist(s)	Joshua Ehmen	43	Air Force Academy
2nd place, silver medalist(s)	James Rice	38	Benedict College
2nd place, silver medalist(s)	Rusty Stegall	38	Lander University
4	Jason Schumpert	37	Lander University
5	Tony Wrice	34	West Point Gold

== All-Tournament Team ==
Bill Bigham	University of North Carolina
Joshua Ehmen	Air Force Academy	Top Scorer
Chad Voelkert	Furman University
Tony Wrice	West Point Gold	5th Top Scorer
Derek Diener	West Point Black
Jason Schumpert	Lander University	4th Top Scorer
Frank Wendt	West Point Black
