= Woollen Gymnasium =

Gymnasium at the University of North Carolina, Chapel Hill

Charles T. Woollen Gymnasium
- Woollen Gymnasium and Woollen
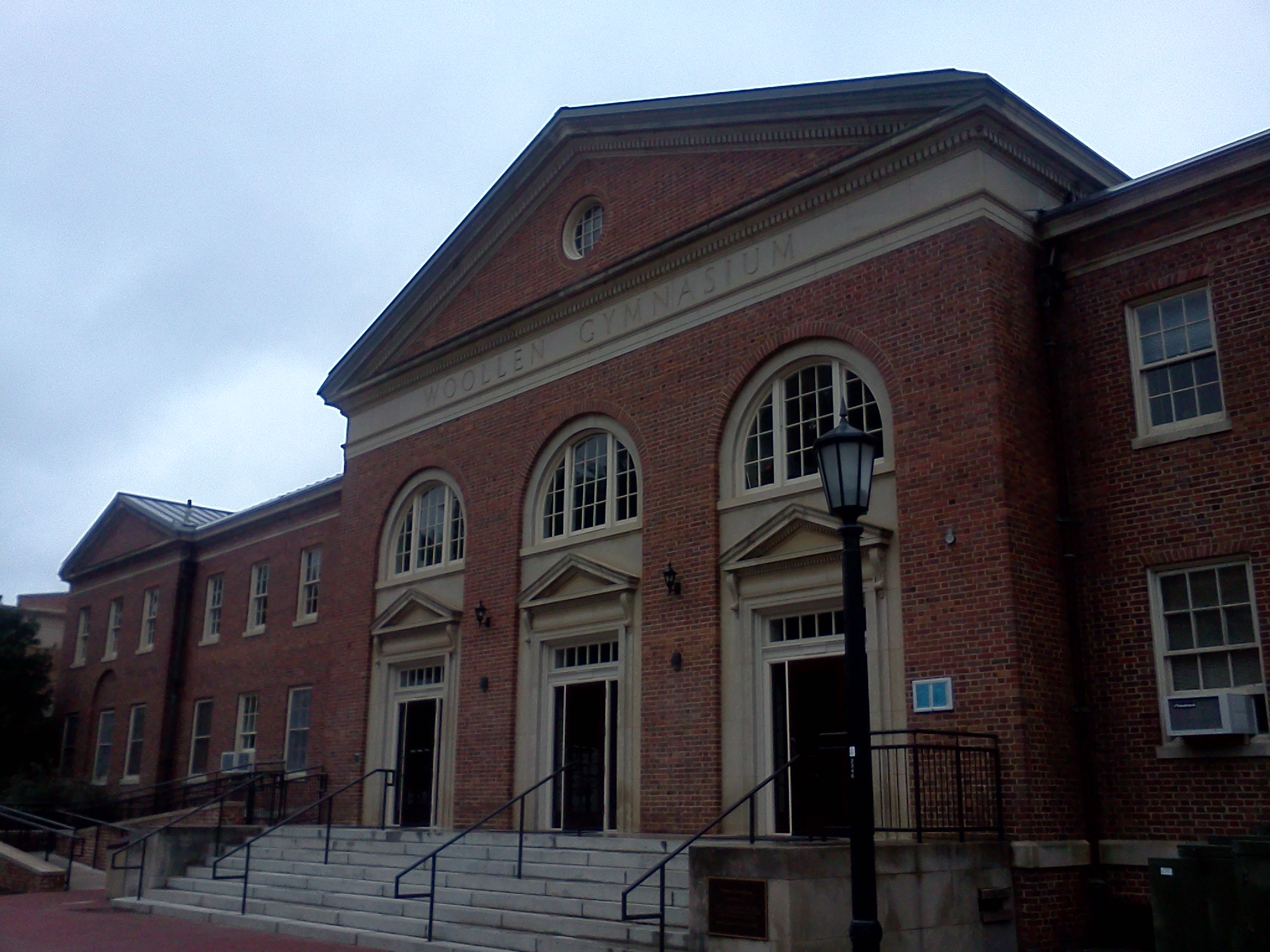
- Interactive map of Charles T. Woollen Gymnasium
- Location: 300 South Road, Chapel Hill, N.C., United States
- Coordinates: 35°54′33.65″N 79°2′45.13″W
- Owner: University of North Carolina at Chapel Hill
- Operator: University of North Carolina at Chapel Hill
- Capacity: 4,500–6,000 (Note: The capacity often varied in reports by sources: 4,500 (in 1962 and 1963), 4,800 (in 1958, 1959, & 1960), 4,918 (in 1961), 5,000 (in 1963 and 1964), 5,632 (in 1953, 1955, 1956, & 1957) & 6,000 (in 1945, 1949, 1950, 1951, & 1952). It was also stated that the venue could allow for 10,000 people to attend public gatherings in the main gymnasium.)
- Field size: 303 by 175 feet (92 by 53 m)

Construction
- Groundbreaking: 1937
- Opened: 1938
- Renovated: 2004, 2009–2012
- Expanded: 1942
- Cost: $646,000 (including swimming pool)
- Architects: Atwood and Weeks
- Main contractors: J. A. Jones Construction Company (general construction) Reliance Engineering Company (heating) W. M. Wiggins (plumbing)

Tenants
- North Carolina Tar Heels (NCAA); Men's basketball (1938–1965)

The Charles T. Woollen Gymnasium (commonly known as the Woollen Gymnasium or Woollen) is a building used for physical education classes, recreational activity for students, and office spaces. It was the home of North Carolina Tar Heels men's basketball team from January 2, 1939, through February 27, 1965, across twenty-six seasons. Due to increased demand for viewing the varsity basketball team and limited capacity at then home court the Tin Can, school president Frank Porter Graham and Charles T. Woollen requested public funds for a new gymnasium and women's dormitory. After being rejected at the federal level, the North Carolina Public Works would award a grant of $283,090 to build a new gymnasium and the school would have to fundraise to cover the cost's remainder. The plans for the building included multi–level building that included an attached swimming pool, along with a main lobby that would overlook the main gymnasium area. Construction stretched from 1937 to 1938 and, upon completion, was seen as "modern" and one of the highest–quality basketball facilities in the Southern Conference.

The gym was first used competitively for intramural fencing in the spring of 1938. The Tar Heels had great success in the building, winning several conference championships and even winning the national championship to culminate a perfect season in 1956–57. As the Tar Heels increased in popularity and demand increased, Woollen began to be viewed as small. The university began moving some of its home games to Charlotte or Greensboro to allow for more to attend and bring in more revenue. The Tar Heels left for Carmichael Auditorium before the start of the 1965–66 season, an auditorium that was built attached to Woollen as per stipulated by the funds awarded by the North Carolina legislature. After the Tar Heels' departure, the facility was frequently used for course registration, pick–up basketball, and now the Exercise and Sports Science department is based in the building.

== Background and construction ==
The growth of the University of North Carolina in the 1910s and early 1920s strove the efforts to build a new facility so that more of the student body would be able to view games. (Note: The school was known as the University of North Carolina until February 1963.) Then Graduate Manager of Athletics Charles T. Woollen elected to build the Tin Can in 1923 as a temporary solution before constructing a permanent venue for the varsity team. Woollen had started collecting data in 1918 on gymnasiums and swimming pools as the Tar Heels played in their first home arena Bynum Gymnasium and through their time in the Tin Can. In 1927, an editorial in school newspaper The Daily Tar Heel wrote that "One of the urgent needs of the university which demands attention is the growing necessity for a new gymnasium to take care for the physical welfare of the increasing student body." The Daily Tar Heel published an article each year advocating for a new gym. In the spring of 1935, school president Frank Porter Graham and Woollen sought out close to $500,000 in public funds for the building of a new gymnasium and a women's dormitory. Initial efforts failed and Woollen returned to Washington, D.C., and met with President of the United States Franklin Delano Roosevelt; however, due to low unemployment levels in Chapel Hill the request was denied. Despite the rejection, Woollen persisted and North Carolina Public Works director Stanley H. Wright announced on October 24, 1936, that the university would receive a $283,090 grant to build the gymnasium and the rest of the required funds—$346,000—would have to be raised by the school. The building plans were developed by Atwood and Weeks.

Bids for the construction contracts started in January 1937 with a 30-day deadline for submission, but the deadline was extended through March 9. On March 23, Wright announced the contracts for the building of the gym: J.A. Jones Construction Company for general construction, Reliance Engineering Company for heating, and W. M. Wiggins for plumbing. The respective prices for the contracts were $415,957, $47,007, and $20,909. Details were released regarding the buildings functions and specifications including the main gymnasium structure would be 303 by 175 feet (92 by 53 m) (while the gym floor would be 250 by 150 feet (76 by 46 m)), the swimming pool would be in a 220 by 82 feet (67 by 25 m) attached structure with a swimming surface of 165 by 55 feet (50 by 17 m), a lobby that overlooks the gym from the second floor that houses the classrooms, offices, and fan rooms. The main gym floor gave room for two varsity basketball courts, along with courts for volleyball, intramural basketball, shuffleboard, handball, badminton, and one tennis court. The ground floor contained the locker rooms, squash and handball courts, showers, and treatment rooms. The maple hardwood would be installed over a concrete floor to cover the entire first, main floor. The backboards for the goals were glass. The building itself was built with colonial brick and trimmed with limestone.

Construction was to begin within two weeks of Wright's announcements of the contract, which began with the clearing of trees on site with the goal of finishing the project by January 11, 1938. Excavations were finished in May after weather delays in April. By January 1938, construction had been delayed due for three primary reasons: around 2,000 cubic yards of blue granite had to be removed, which was more than anticipated; a delay in the steel delivery; and heavy rains in the first three months of construction prevented trucks from operating on the ground that led to nearly 20 work days lost due to rain alone. Arrangements were made for the presentation of the pool and gymnasium prior to their completion in March, for March 24 and 25; however, on the night of the 22nd, four students snuck into the gym and swam in the pool, which led the school to place Federal agents outside the facilities to monitor it until it was officially opened. The two days featured several meetings, meals at the Carolina Inn, and presentation talks from President Graham and ex-Governor John C. B. Ehringhaus, among others, while the building would be formally inspected on the 25th with Woollen as the honorary guide. Then physical education professor Oliver Cromwell stated that the gymnasium "[enabled] the University for the first time to provide some form of healthful activity for every member of the student body." The swimming pool was donated by Nathalie Gray, wife of the late Bowman Gray Sr., and her two sons Bowman Jr. and Gordon in his memory. The Daily Tar Heel reported that the gym could accommodate 6,000 people with the portable grandstands placed, while Cromwell stated the maximum capacity could be 8,000. The reported capacity has varied on several accounts. The final cost for the facilities totaled to be $646,000.

Woollen was a good setup for us. We had a good student body, and the stands were full or even overcrowded most of the time.

— North Carolina head coach Ben Carnevale (1944–46)

In early April, rumors had been spreading that the facility would be named in honor of Woollen, leading officials to deny the rumors. Graham stated his intentions to name the gymnasium and it was thought he would do so near commencement. After Graham had proposed the naming during a meeting in commencement, the venue was officially named the "Charles T. Woollen Gymnasium" by the board of trustees in September 1938. Woollen Gymnasium was viewed the "modern" gym in the Atlantic Coast Conference (ACC) for several years after its construction. Across a four-month span in 1942, an $82,000 project was done to expand Woollen. The additions included increased shower space, more lockers, and a physical education area with a 60 by 80 feet (18 by 24 m) area.

== History ==
In April 1938, the men's and women's intramural fencing leagues finals were the first events to be held in the new gym, while days later Georgia Tech's fencing team arrived to play the first intercollegiate match in the new venue. In the fall of 1938, physical education courses started to be held in the facility. President Roosevelt spoke at Woollen before a crowd of over 6,000 people on December 5, 1938. The event was to take place at Kenan Memorial Stadium; however, due to weather it was moved to Woollen. On January 2, 1939, the Tar Heels hosted Atlantic Christian for Woollen gymnasium's first varsity basketball game, where the Tar Heels emerged victorious 57–19. As the Tar Heels succeeded under McGuire, the student ticket distribution had to be altered due to increased desire. The tickets would be allocated for those with the last names between A to M would get tickets for the first home game and those from N to Z would get the next home game and alternate in that pattern. The gymnasium soon began to be viewed as small due to increased interest and larger enrollments, capacity became a larger concern when the Tobacco Road schools played in the venue. While playing in Woollen, the Tar Heels reached two NCAA national championship games, in 1946 and 1957, emerging victorious in the latter and to cap a 32–0 season.

The fan support we had in Woollen was unbelievable. It was a madhouse. They’d let about 500 visiting fans in, and the rest of the place was just students. You could hear them a mile away. It was bedlam.

— North Carolina Guard Bob Cunningham (1955–58)

As the Tar Heels increased in popularity, the university chose to have home games at off-campus venues as Woollen's seating was so limited, choosing to play in Charlotte or Greensboro instead. By playing at these locations, the school would turn more profit than normal home games at Woollen since student tickets were limited for these games and the venue was larger, allowing more tickets to be sold to the masses. In the team's final season at Woollen, the Tar Heels only played seven true home games. Carolina played their final home game at Woollen on February 27, 1965, against Duke and won 71–66. North Carolina played 265 games in Woollen and finished with a record of 210–55 (.792). As of the conclusion of the 2019–20 season, Woollen has the worst home winning percentage of the five home venues for the Tar Heels. The Tar Heels went undefeated at Woollen Gymnasium in four of their twenty-six seasons at the facility: 1958–59 (6–0), 1960–61 (7–0), 1956–57 (8–0), and 1955–56 (10–0). The most losses in a single season while playing in Woollen came in the 1943–44 campaign when the Tar Heels lost five games. The Tar Heels showed success in the Southern Conference while in Woollen as they won the regular season championship in 1941, 1944, and 1946, while winning their post–season conference tournament in 1940 and 1945. After the Tar Heels moved into the ACC before the season started in 1953, the Tar Heels continued to succeed. North Carolina won the ACC regular season title in 1956, 1957, 1959, 1960, and 1961, while winning the post–season conference tournament in 1957.

In January 1947, it was announced that due to student demand, no public tickets would be offered for the rest of the season. As early as 1948 there began to be sentiments that Woollen was too small. In 1958, after the university began to reduce the number of true home games, the student newspaper The Daily Tar Heel showed dissatisfaction with that decision and felt a new gym with a larger capacity would be needed to keep drawing strong competition. The article cited how Coach Adolph Rupp and the Kentucky Wildcats played at Duke in front of a less than capacity crowd and would not return because they made little money off the visit. In July 1962, there was a request to the North Carolina state legislature by the Consolidated University to receive funds to build an addition to Woollen Gym rather than a new $6 million coliseum as some had proposed. Construction began in May 1964 for the new Auditorium. It was hoped that the larger capacity (estimated to be 10,000) in the auditorium would allow the university to turn a profit on home games for basketball. At the time, the basketball program only made money from road trips. The new venue that shared Woollen's eastern wall, officially named Carmichael Auditorium, was finished in 1965 in time for the start of the 1965–66 season.

=== After the basketball team's departure ===
For a period of time after the Tar Heels moved to Carmichael, the building was used for class registration before the advent of online registering. The venue contains eight full basketball courts, which led it to become a place where students frequent to play pick-up basketball despite newer courts opening up on campus. In addition, it has hosted intramural basketball leagues over the years. The Exercise and Sports Science department is based in Woollen. In May 2004, Woollen was closed to have the original gym floor replaced with a new 35,000 sq. foot floor, along with the infrastructure and classroom renovations, as part of a five-month renovation occurred because a bond of $516,500 was given to the university for the renovations. The floor was subsequently donated to a local Habitat for Humanity and all the proceeds from its sale benefited the organization. The gym was officially reopened on October 6, 2004, with a ceremony that featured several former Tar Heels who played in the venue. When the gym was closed again for more renovations starting in the summer of 2009, there was a notable increase in wait time at Rams Head gym's basketball courts. The renovations were completed in time for the start of the spring 2012 semester. The renovations, which costed around $5.2 million, included two new dance studios and piping replacement, among other additions. As of 2014, the courts still attracted over 150 people per day.
