= Knight Air Flight 816 =

1995 aviation accident

Coordinates: 53°55′N 1°31′W

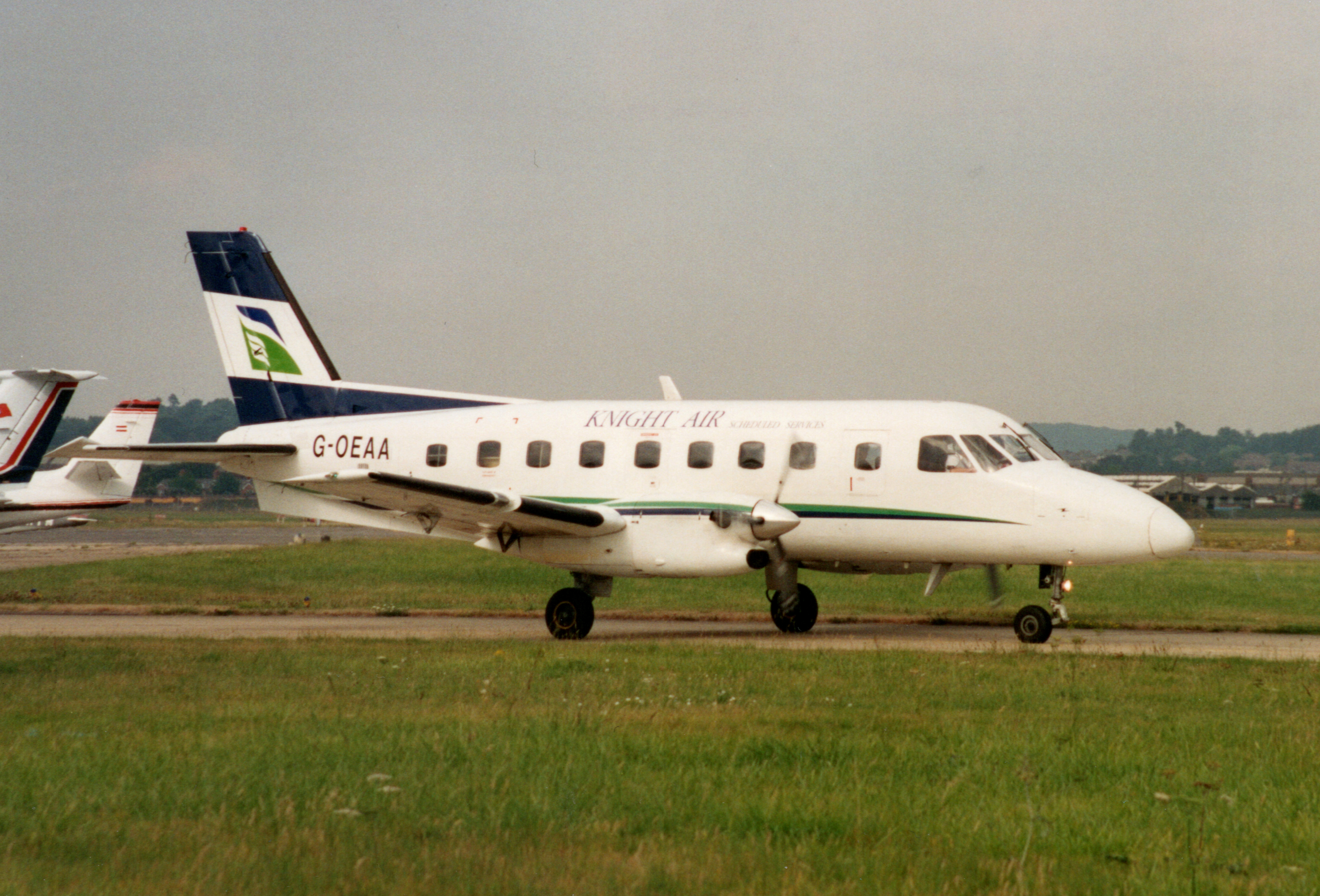
- G-OEAA, the aircraft involved, seen in 1994

Accident
- Date: 24 May 1995
- Summary: Loss of control
- Site: Dunkeswick, United Kingdom

Aircraft
- Aircraft type: Embraer 110 Bandeirante
- Operator: Knight Air
- Call sign: KNIGHTWAY 816
- Registration: G-OEAA
- Flight origin: Leeds Bradford International Airport, Leeds, United Kingdom
- Destination: Aberdeen Airport, Aberdeen, United Kingdom
- Occupants: 12
- Passengers: 9
- Crew: 3
- Fatalities: 12
- Survivors: 0

Knight Air Flight 816, operated by an Embraer 110 Bandeirante belonging to Knight Air, was a domestic scheduled flight operating between Leeds Bradford and Aberdeen airports on 24 May 1995, which crashed shortly after take-off, with the loss of all on board.

== Background ==
=== Aircraft ===
The aircraft involved, manufactured in 1980, was an Embraer 110 Bandeirante registered as G-OEAA. In its 15 years of service, it had logged 15348 airframe hours.

=== Crew ===
In command was a 49-year-old male captain who had logged 3257 hours of flying time, 1026 of which were logged on the Embraer 110. His co-pilot was a 29-year-old male who had logged 302 hours of flying time, including 46 hours logged on the Embraer 110.

== Accident ==
The aircraft departed Leeds Bradford Airport at 16:47 hours UTC departure from runway 14, and was observed immediately to veer off the ATC instructed flight path; one minute and 50 seconds into the flight, the first officer reported problems with the artificial horizons in the plane and asked to return to Leeds Bradford.

Local weather was poor with restricted visibility, low cloud, and a recent thunderstorm – 'turbulent instrument meteorological conditions', according to the AAIB, dark and stormy conditions according to residents in the vicinity.

The crew experienced significant difficulties maintaining their heading while returning to the airport. The aircraft subsequently entered a left turn, rapidly lost height and crashed at Dunkeswick Moor, north of Harewood, West Yorkshire, 6 miles (10 km) north east of the airport. None of the crew or nine passengers survived the crash.

== Cause ==
An Air Accident Investigation Branch report found that one or both artificial horizons in the aircraft failed, leading to loss of control by the pilots and the plane entering a spiral dive exceeding operating parameters and leading to partial break-up before impact.
