= Fetzer Hall =

Sport venue at the University of North Carolina at Chapel Hill

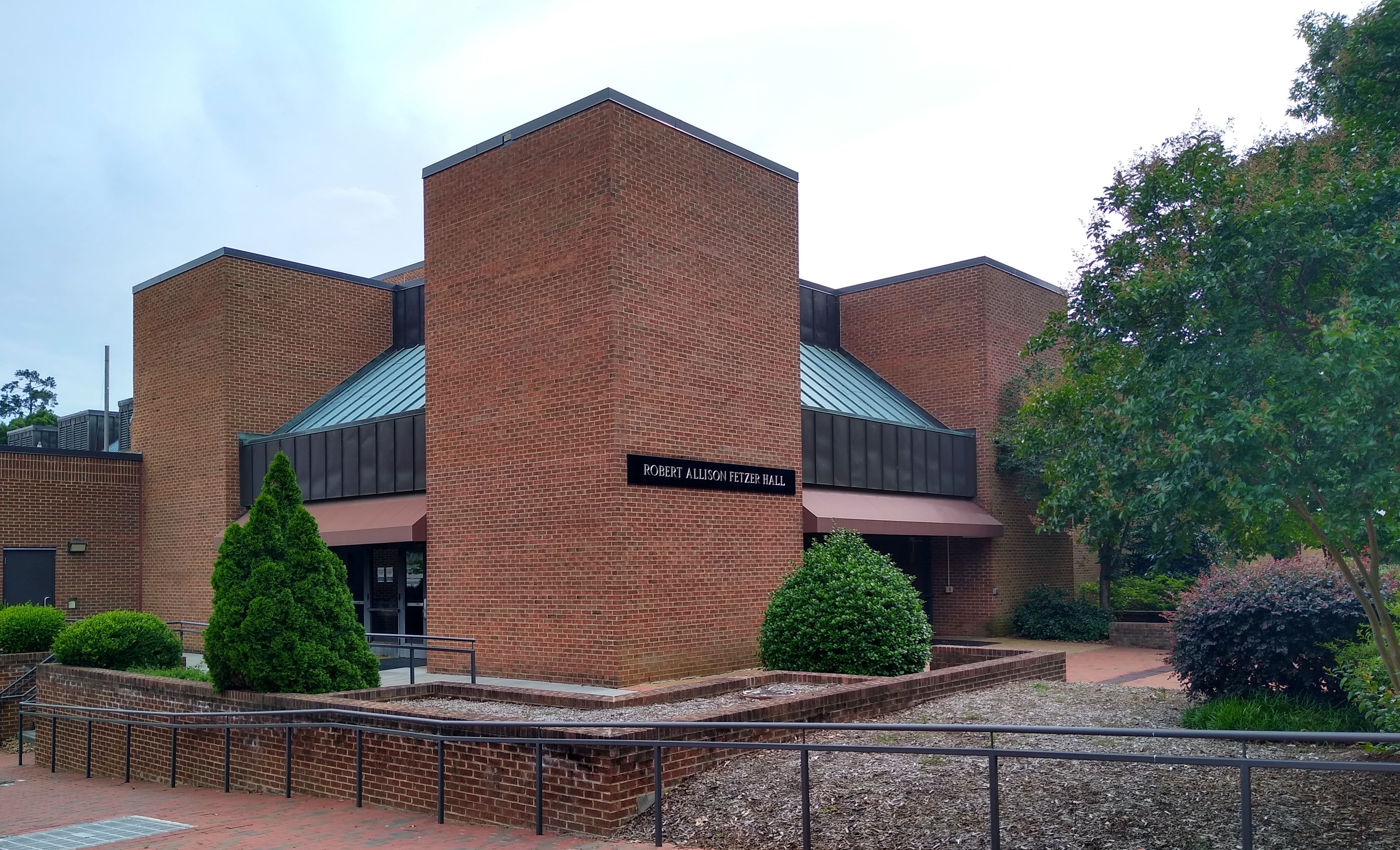
- Interactive map of Fetzer Hall
- Full name: Robert Allison Fetzer Hall
- Location: South Road, Chapel Hill, N.C., United States
- Coordinates: 35°54′32″N 79°03′06″W
- Owner: University of North Carolina at Chapel Hill
- Operator: University of North Carolina at Chapel Hill

Tenants
- Non-varsity sports Carolina THC

Robert Allison Fetzer Hall is a multi-purpose sport venue on the campus of University of North Carolina at Chapel Hill in Chapel Hill, North Carolina, United States. The building hosts several sport courts. The Fetzer Gyms A and B are used for basketball, volleyball, badminton and team handball.

== History ==
On April 12, 1976, the university's trustees approved the building plans for a new facility on the site of the Tin Can. It was also revealed they were debating on what to do with the Tin Can: either move it to the east end of Fetzer Field or build a new facility like the Tin Can in that same location. Prior to deciding on the future of the venue, the trustees wanted to see the cost estimates for moving the Tin Can. The structure was finally demolished in 1977 to allow for the hall's construction. The venue was removed with a bulldozer in early June.
