= West Point Team Handball =

- Full name: West Point Team Handball
- Short name: WPTHB
- Founded: 1976
- Arena: Arvin Gymnasium
- Head coach: MAJ Coree Aten
- Captain: Owen Rodgers and Samuel Neaves
- League: The Northeast Team Handball League
- Club colours

West Point Team Handball is a handball club from West Point, New York, United States. They are the handball team of the United States Military Academy. They play with four teams at various competitions. There are two teams for each gender. The West Point Black team (men and women) is the first team and the West Point Gold team (men and women) is the second team. They have won the most College National Championships in their collegiate league with the men's team winning 40 College National Championships, with their 18th consecutive College National Championship in 2026 at North Carolina State University. Three past members have competed in the Summer Olympics for Team USA to include Peter Lash (’81) - 1984 & 1988 Summer Olympics in Los Angeles and Korea; LTC (R) Craig Gilbert (’78) - 1984 Summer Olympics in Los Angeles and Mike Thornberry (’93) - 1996 Summer Olympics in Atlanta. Many other players have competed for the USA National Team to include Mark Miller ('24) and Gary Phillips ('25).

Location of West Point Team Handball

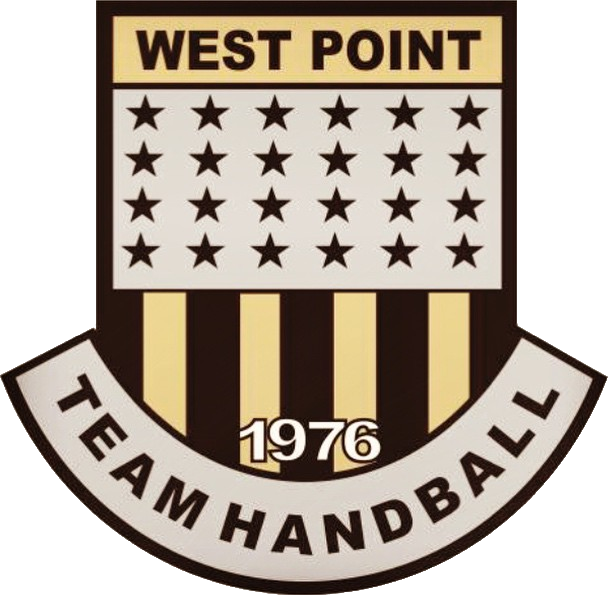
Current logo since 2015

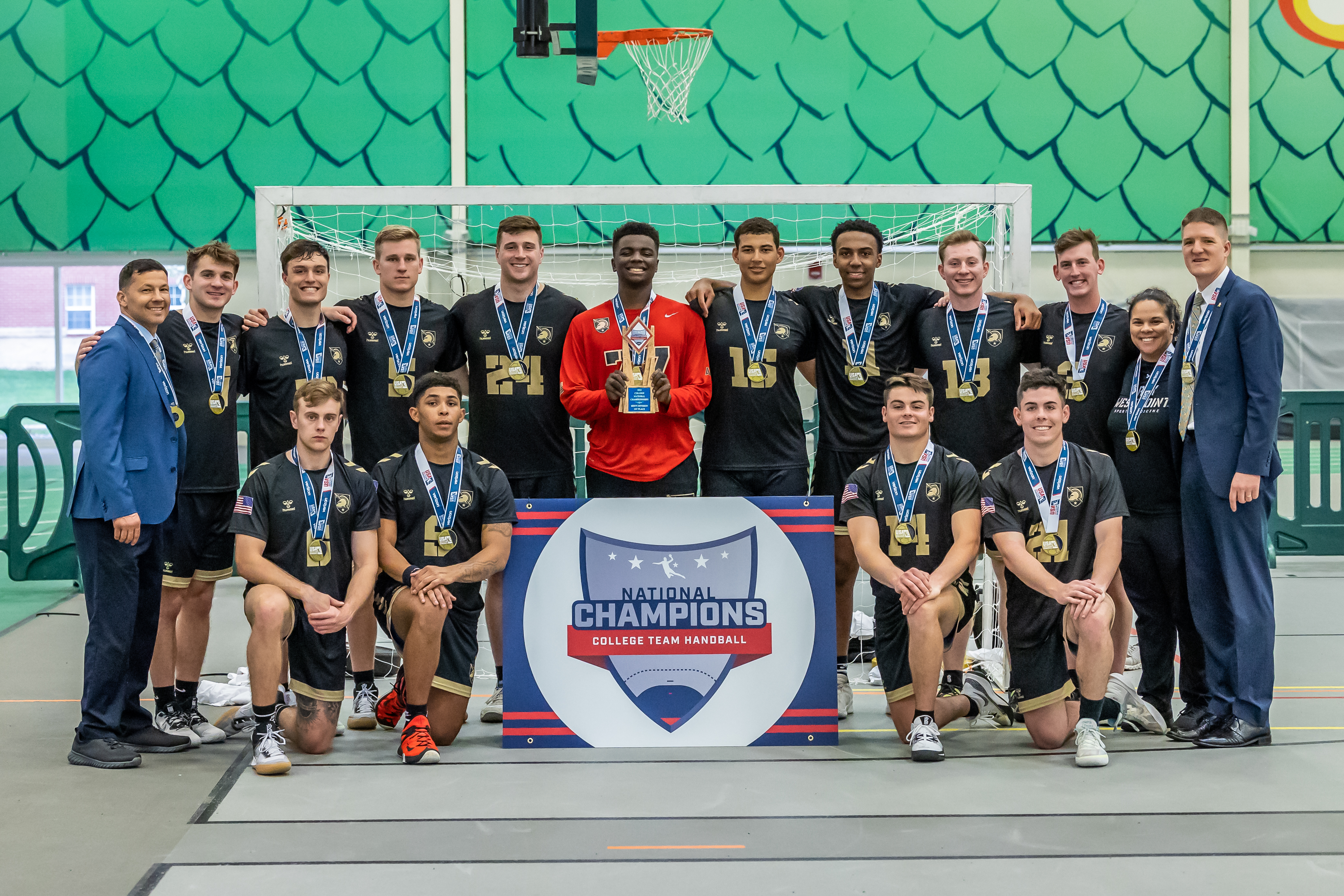

== Accomplishments ==
- Nationals:
  - Men's Elite:
    - Bronze : 2014
    - Silver : 2007
  - Men's Open / Division I:
    - Bronze : 1998
    - Gold : 2006
    - Silver : 2014
  - Men's Division II:
    - Bronze : 2017
- College Nationals:
  - Men:
    - Gold : 1976, 1979–1982, 1985–1987, 1989–1993, 1995–2001, 2003, 2007–2019, 2022–2026
    - Silver : 2002–2006, 2010–2013, 2015–2016
  - Bronze : 2024–2025
  - Women:
    - Gold : 1980, 1990–1991, 1996, 1999–2003, 2005–2007, 2012–2017, 2019, 2022, 2023, 2024, 2026
    - Silver : 2009–2011, 2022, 2025
    - Bronze : 2000, 2002, 2006 2010, 2015–2017, 2024
- Northeast Team Handball League
  - Men's Division I:
    - Silver : 2012/2013, 2013/14, 2015/16, 2016/17, 2022, 2023
    - Bronze : 2009/2010, 2011/12, 2014/15
  - Women's Division:
    - Gold : 2014/2015
- Carolina Blue Cup (men) : 6
  - Gold : 1991, 1992, 1998, 2009, 2010, 2024
  - Silver : 1993, 1997, 2004, 2008, 2016
  - Bronze : 1994, 2000, 2007, 2011, 2023

== Head coaches ==
| Season | Coach | Seasons | College Nationals Titles | % |
|---|---|---|---|---|
| 1975–1978 | CPT James J. Thome Sr. | 3/6 | 1/4 | 33/75 |
| 1978–1979 | LTC Gert Evert | 1 | 1 | 100 |
| 1979–1981 | CPT Terry Freeman | 2/3 | 2/3 | 100/100 |
| 1981–1983 | MAJ Bob Asiello | 2 | 1 | 50 |
| 1983–1985 | MAJ Jim Johnston | 2 | 1 | 50 |
| 1985–1986 | MAJ Terry Freeman (2) | 1/3 | 1/3 | 100/100 |
| 1986–1988 | MAJ Howard Barton | 2 | 1 | 50 |
| 1988–1991 | LTC James J. Thome Sr. (2) | 3/6 | 3/4 | 100/75 |
| 1991–1992 | MAJ John Turner | 1 | 1 | 100 |
| 1992–1993 | MAJ Bill Nanry | 1 | 1 | 100 |
| 1993–1994 | MAJ Rollie Jacobs | 1 | 0 | 0 |
| 1994–1996 | MAJ Bill Rapp | 2 | 1 | 50 |
| 1996–1997 | MAJ Greg Wise | 1 | 1 | 100 |
| 1997–1998 | MAJ Mike Endres | 1 | 1 | 100 |
| 1998–2000 | CPT Jonathan Negin | 2 | 2 | 100 |
| 2000–2002 | MAJ Kevin Volk | 2 | 1 | 50 |
| 2002–2004 | MAJ Darren Smith | 2 | 1 | 50 |
| 2004–2005 | MAJ Kyle Simpson | 1 | 0 | 0 |
| 2005–2008 | CPT Chris Springer | 3 | 2 | 67 |
| 2008–2009 | MAJ Travis Habhab | 1 | 1 | 100 |
| 2009–2010 | MAJ Adam Hodges | 1 | 1 | 100 |
| 2010–2012 | MAJ Michael Tilton | 2 | 2 | 100 |
| 2012–2014 | MAJ Harry Terzic | 2 | 2 | 100 |
| 2014–2016 | CPT Reginald Shelton | 2 | 2 | 100 |
| 2016–2018 | CPT Jonathan Harmeling | 2 | 2 | 100 |
| 2018–2021 | SFC Eric Lawson | 3 | 1 (Note: 2020 and 2021 edition were cancelled due to Covid. Therefore, Eric Lawson won 100% of the possible College Nationals.) | 100 |
| 2021-2024 | MAJ Craig Champlin | 3 | 3 | 100 |
| 2024-2026 | MAJ Dylan Hyde | 2 | 2 | 100 |
| 2026- | MAJ Coree Aten | - | - | - |

Was a captain and coach of the West Point Team Handball
Was a player and coach of the West Point Team Handball

== Captains ==
| Season | Captain | College Nationals |
|---|---|---|
| 1975–76 | Marty Wisda | 1st Place: 1976 |
| 1978-77 | Mike Harwood | Attended: 1977 |
| 1977–78 | Joe James | Attended: 1978 |
| 1978–79 | Mike Clark | 1st Place: 1979 |
| 1979–80 | Mark House | 1st Place: 1980 |
| 1980–81 | Jim Kons | 1st Place: 1981 |
| 1981–82 | Mark Condry | 1st Place: 1982 |
| 1982–83 | Brad Elrod | |
| 1983–84 | Bill Rapp | |
| 1984–85 | Rick Oleksyk | 1st Place: 1985 |
| 1985–86 | Mike Endres | 1st Place: 1986 |
| 1986–87 | Ross Brown | 1st Place: 1987 |
| 1987–88 | Joe Chatfield | 1st Place: 1988 |
| 1988–89 | Chip Anderson | 1st Place: 1989 |
| 1989–90 | Kevin Hucthinson | 1st Place: 1990 |
| 1990–91 | Rhett Nichol | 1st Place: 1991 |
| 1991–92 | H. Huthison | 1st Place: 1992 |
| 1992–93 | JT Thome | 1st Place: 1993 |
| 1993–94 | R. Heine | |
| 1994–95 | | 1st Place: 1995 |
| 1995–96 | | 1st Place: 1996 |
| 1996–97 | David Borden | 1st Place: 1997 |
| 1997–98 | Jonathan Hartley | 1st Place: 1998 |
| 1998–99 | J. Kohowski | 1st Place: 1999 |
| 1999-00 | Frank Wendt | 1st Place: 2000 |
| 2000–01 | Mike Gilmartin | 1st Place: 2001 |
| 2001–02 | Adam Clements | 2nd Place: 2002 |
| 2002–03 | Kurtis Bennett | 1st Place: 2003 |
| 2003–04 | Tim Lawrence | 2nd Place: 2004 |
| 2004–05 | | 2nd Place: 2005 |
| 2005–06 | Alex Deep | 2nd Place: 2006 |
| 2006–07 | Alex Mullin | 1st Place: 2007 |
| 2007–08 | Jonathan Harmeling | 1st Place: 2008 |
| 2008–09 | Brian Walsh | 1st Place: 2009 |
| 2009–10 | Jason Borchik & Pat Saxby | 1st Place: 2010 |
| 2010–11 | Adam Moore, Marc Beaudoin, & Rickey Royal | 1st Place: 2011 |
| 2011–12 | Mark Conard & Greg Ayers | 1st Place: 2012 |
| 2012–13 | Craig Champlin & Ian Emory | 1st Place: 2013 |
| 2013–14 | Andrew College & Sean Boyle | 1st Place: 2014 |
| 2014–15 | Coree Aten & Connor Holt | 1st Place: 2015 |
| 2015–16 | Alec Zeck & Corinth Cross | 1st Place: 2016 |
| 2016–17 | Paul Palmer | 1st Place: 2017 |
| 2017–18 | Nick Scheblar | 1st Place: 2018 |
| 2018–19 | Nick Webster | 1st Place: 2019 |
| 2019–20 | Rob Purdy | No tournament due to COVID-19 |
| 2020–21 | Ryan Thistlewood & Nathan Chilian | No tournament due to COVID-19 |
| 2021–22 | Chris Frazier & Will Considine | 1st Place: 2022 |
| 2022–23 | Colin Gray & Spencer Knudsen | 1st Place: 2023 |
| 2023–24 | Mark Miller & Ethan Flege | 1st Place: 2024 |
| 2024–25 | Gary Phillips & Aidan Halloran | 1st Place: 2025 |
| 2025–26 | Jamison Uptgraft & Caden Uptgraft | 1st Place: 2026 |
| 2026–27 | Owen Rodgers & Samuel Neaves | |

== Rankings ==
=== 2017–18 ===
| | | Month 1 | Month 2 | Month 3 | Month 4 | Month 5 | Month 6 Final |
|---|---|---|---|---|---|---|---|
| Black | Men's | 7 | 7 | 7 | 11 | 10 | 7 |
| Black | College | * | 1 (9) | * | 1 (8) | 1 (7) | 1 (5) |
| Gold | Men's | 20 | NR | NR | NR | NR | 24 |
| Gold | College | * | NR | * | 5т | NR | 3 |

=== 2018–19 ===
| | | Month 1 | Month 2 | Month 3 | Month 4 | Month 5 | Month 6 | Month 7 Final |
|---|---|---|---|---|---|---|---|---|
| Black | Men's | 6 | 6 | 7 | | | | |
| Black | College | 1 (7) | 1 (7) | 1 (6) | | | | |
| Black | Women's | NV | NR | NR | | | | |
| Gold | Men's | 17 | 22 т | NR | | | | |
| Gold | College | NV | NV | NV | | | | |

* No Ranking was released.

Legend
| | Improvement in ranking |
| | Drop in ranking |
| | Not ranked previous week |
| | No change in ranking from previous week |
| NR | Received votes but were not ranked in Top 25 of men's poll or Top 5 College poll |
| т | Tied with team above or below also with this symbol |

== Current roster ==
| Number | Name | Year | Position |
|---|---|---|---|
| 1 | Caden Uptgraft | Senior | Center back |
| 19 | Reid Wesley | Senior | Pivot |
| 3 | Cooper Johnson | Junior | Left wing |
| 7 | Jacob Johnson | Junior | Right wing |
| 21 | Owen Rodgers | Junior | Right back |
| 5 | Sam Orcutt | Junior | Right back |
| 28 | Liam Gilfillan | Senior | Goalie |
| 10 | Jamison Uptgraft | Senior | Left back |
| 4 | Jack Kendrick | Senior | Pivot |
| 6 | Kalev Kilgast | Junior | Left back |
| 24 | Sam Neaves | Junior | Center back |
| 22 | Tyson Smith | Sophomore | Right wing |
| 11 | Toby Thompson | Junior | Pivot |
| 16 | Thomas Nicholson | Junior | Center back |
