= Carolina THC =

American handball club

- Full name: Carolina Team Handball Club
- Short name: CTHC
- Founded: Dr John M. Silva 1989 (before April 06)
- Arena: Fetzer Gymnasiums
- President: Dr. John M. Silva, founder, executive director
- Head coach: Men's university: Aaron Hamm; TJ Smith Carolina Blue: Jordan Boyst; Paul Scruggs Wade Sutton
- Captain: TBD
- League: Independent
- Club colours
Home	Away

Carolina THC is a handball club from Chapel Hill, North Carolina, United States. They are the handball team of the University of North Carolina at Chapel Hill. They play with four teams at various competitions. The first team, called Carolina THC, is the university team; the Tar Heels THC is a competitive development team; and Carolina Blue and Carolina Blue Heat are the alumni teams.

Location of Carolina THC

== Victories ==
- 3-time winner of the men's College Nationals, 2004–2006
- 5-time winner of the women's College Nationals, 2004, 2009–2011, 2025
- Winner of the men Southeast Team Handball Conference, 2000
- Winner of the women Southeast Team Handball Conference, 2004

== Carolina Blue Cup ==
The Carolina THC is the host of the annual Carolina Blue Cup. They have won it four times: in 2007, 2020, 2022, and 2026.

== Rankings ==
=== 2005-06 ===
		Week 1	Week 2	Week 3	Week 4 Final
Carolina	USA Top 5			NR	

=== 2017-18 ===
		Month 1	Month 2	Month 3	Month 4	Month 5	Month 6 Final
Carolina	Men's	17	NR	NR	NR	NR	
Carolina	College	*	NR	*	4т	NR	5
Tar Heels	Men's			NR			
Tar Heels	College	*		*			
Carolina Blue	Men's	11	9	9	10	25т	12

* No ranking was released.

Non of the women's team received votes for the women's poll.

=== 2018-19 ===
		Month 1	Month 2	Month 3	Month 4	Month 5	Month 6	Month 7 Final
Carolina	Men's	14	NR	13				
Carolina	College	2	2	2 (1)				
Carolina	Women's	NR	NV	NV				
Tar Heels	Men's	NR	NV	NV				
Tar Heels	College	NV	NV	NV				
Carolina Blue	Men's	8	7	9				

Legend
	Improvement in ranking
	Drop in ranking
	Not ranked previous week
	No change in ranking from previous week
NR	Received votes but were not ranked in Top 25 of men's poll or Top 5 College poll
т	Tied with team above or below also with this symbol
