= United Athletic Conference =

American college athletics conference

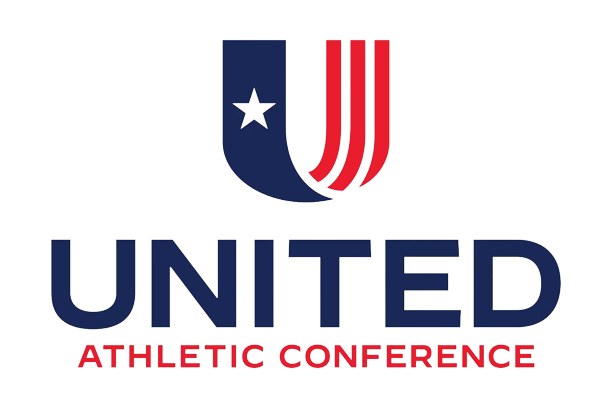
- Formerly: Western Athletic Conference (1962–2026)
- Association: NCAA
- Founded: July 27, 1962; 64 years ago
- Commissioner: Jeff Bacon (CEO); Rebekah Ray (chief administrative officer) (Note: The titles reflect Bacon's and Ray's positions within Unisun Sports, a joint venture between the WAC/UAC and Atlantic Sun Conference that provides the administrative structure for both leagues. Previously, Bacon and Ray had respectively been the commissioners of the ASUN and WAC.) (since July 1, 2026)
- Sports fielded: 16; men's: 7; women's: 9
- Division: Division I
- Subdivision: FCS (football)
- No. of teams: 9
- Headquarters: Jacksonville, Florida (Note: Headquarters of Unisun Sports.)
- Region: Southern United States
- Broadcaster: ESPN
- Website: uacsports.com

Locations

The United Athletic Conference (UAC), also known as The United, is an NCAA Division I conference founded in 1962. Prior to July 1, 2026, the conference operated as the Western Athletic Conference (WAC) from its inception.

For the first 41 years of its existence, the WAC competed at the highest level of college athletics across all sports. The conference expanded from its original six members to a peak of 16 in 1996, before eight of its institutions (including the four remaining charter members) seceded in 1998 to form the Mountain West Conference. Thereafter the WAC struggled to maintain a top-level football conference and ultimately discontinued the sport after the 2012–13 season, leaving the NCAA's Football Bowl Subdivision (formerly known as Division I-A) to become a Division I non-football conference. After a major expansion in 2021, the WAC reinstated football, competing in the Football Championship Subdivision (FCS). Further membership losses soon foiled plans to someday return to the FBS level, and in 2023 the WAC again became a non-football conference, with its football-playing members joining the football schools of the Atlantic Sun Conference (ASUN) to form the football-only United Athletic Conference (UAC).

The WAC officially rebranded as the United Athletic Conference on July 1, 2026, and membership under this new identity includes the three continuing members of the WAC (Abilene Christian University, Tarleton State University, and non-football University of Texas at Arlington), the five members of the pre-2026 ASUN that played football in the single-sport UAC (Austin Peay State University, University of Central Arkansas, Eastern Kentucky University, University of North Alabama, and University of West Georgia), and the non-football University of Arkansas at Little Rock (athletically known as Little Rock) from the Ohio Valley Conference.

== History ==
=== 1960s: Formation ===
Locations of WAC founding schools

The WAC formed out of a series of talks between Brigham Young University athletic director Eddie Kimball and other university administrators from 1958 to 1961 to form a new athletic conference that would better fit the needs and situations of certain universities which were at the time members of the Border, Skyline, and Pacific Coast Conferences. Potential member universities who were represented at the meetings included BYU, Washington State, Oregon, Oregon State, Utah, New Mexico, Arizona, Arizona State, and Wyoming. While the three Washington and Oregon schools elected to stay in a revamped Pac-8 Conference that replaced the scandal-plagued PCC, the remaining six schools formed the WAC. The Border and Skyline conferences, having each lost three of their stronger members, dissolved at the end of the 1961–62 season. The charter members of the WAC were Arizona, Arizona State, BYU, New Mexico, Utah, and Wyoming. New Mexico State and Utah State applied for charter membership and were turned down; they would eventually become WAC members 43 years later.

The conference proved to be an almost perfect fit for the six schools from both a competitive and financial standpoint. Arizona and Arizona State, in particular, experienced success in baseball with Arizona garnering the 1963 College World Series (CWS) runner-up trophy and ASU winning the CWS in 1965, 1967, and 1969. Colorado State and Texas–El Paso (UTEP), at that time just renamed from Texas Western College, were accepted in September 1967 (joined in July 1968) to bring membership up to eight.

=== 1970s and 1980s: Success and first expansion ===
With massive growth in the state of Arizona, the balance of WAC play in the 1970s became increasingly skewed in favor of the Arizona schools, who won or tied for all but two WAC football titles from 1969 onward. In the summer of 1978, the two schools left the WAC for the Pac-8, which became the Pac-10, and were replaced in the WAC by San Diego State and, one year later, Hawaii. The WAC further expanded by adding Air Force in the summer of 1980. A college football national championship won by Brigham Young in 1984 added to the WAC's reputation. This nine-team line-up of the WAC defined the conference for nearly 15 years.

=== 1990s: Second wave of expansion ===
Fresno State expanded its athletic program in the early 1990s and was granted membership in 1992 as the nationwide trend against major college programs independent of conferences accelerated. The WAC merged with the High Country Athletic Conference, a parallel organization to the WAC for women's athletics, in 1990 to unify both men's and women's athletics under one administrative structure.

WAC member locations during the four-pod system (1996–1998)

In 1996, the WAC expanded again, adding six schools to its ranks for a total of sixteen. Rice, TCU, and SMU joined the league from the Southwest Conference, which had disbanded. Big West Conference members San Jose State and UNLV were also admitted, as well as Tulsa from the Missouri Valley Conference. Also, two WAC members for men's sports at the time, Air Force and Hawaiʻi, brought their women's sports into the WAC. With the expansion, the WAC was divided into two divisions, the Mountain and the Pacific.

To help in organizing schedules and travel for the far-flung league, the members were divided into four quadrants of four teams each, as follows:

Quadrant 1	Quadrant 2	Quadrant 3	Quadrant 4
Hawaiʻi	UNLV	BYU	Tulsa
Fresno State	Air Force	Utah	TCU
San Diego State	Colorado State	New Mexico	SMU
San Jose State	Wyoming	UTEP	Rice

Quadrant one was always part of the Pacific Division, and quadrant four was always part of the Mountain Division. Quadrant two was part of the Pacific Division for 1996 and 1997 before switching to the Mountain Division in 1998, while the reverse was true for quadrant three. The scheduled fourth year of the alignment was abandoned after eight schools left to form the Mountain West Conference.

The division champions in football met from 1996 to 1998 in the WAC Championship Game, held at Sam Boyd Stadium (also known as the Silver Bowl) in the Las Vegas Valley.

=== 2000s: Turbulence ===
Increasingly, most of the older, pre-1996 members—particularly Air Force, BYU, Colorado State, Utah, and Wyoming—felt chagrin at this new arrangement. Additional concerns centered around finances, as the expanded league stretched approximately 3,900 miles (6,300 km) from Hawaii to Oklahoma and covered nine states and four time zones. With such a far-flung league, travel costs became a concern. The presidents of Air Force, BYU, Colorado State, Utah, and Wyoming met in 1998 at Denver International Airport and agreed to split off to form a new league. The breakaway group invited old-line WAC schools New Mexico and San Diego State, and newcomer UNLV to join them in the new Mountain West Conference, which began competition in 1999.

A USA Today article summed up the reasons behind the split. "With Hawaii and the Texas schools separated by about 3,900 miles and four time zones, travel costs were a tremendous burden for WAC teams. The costs, coupled with lagging revenue and a proposed realignment that would have separated rivals such as Colorado State and Air Force, created unrest among the eight defecting schools."

BYU and Utah would later leave the MWC for the West Coast Conference and Pac-12 Conference, respectively; BYU joined the Big 12 Conference in 2023 while Utah followed in 2024.

Locations of WAC full members from 2005 through 2011

In 2000, the University of Nevada, Reno (Nevada) of the Big West joined as part of its plan to upgrade its athletic program.

TCU left for Conference USA in 2001 (it would later leave CUSA to become the ninth member of the Mountain West in 2005, and joined the Big 12 in 2012).

The Big West announced that it would drop football after the 2000 season, but four of its football-playing members (Boise State, Idaho, New Mexico State, and Utah State) were unwilling to drop football. Boise State was invited to join the WAC and promptly departed the Big West, while New Mexico State and Idaho joined the Sun Belt Conference (NMSU as a full member, Idaho as a "football only" member) and Utah State operated as an independent D-IA program. At the same time, Louisiana Tech (LA Tech) ended its independent Div. I-A status and also accepted an invitation to join the WAC with Boise State.

In 2005, Conference USA sought new members to replenish its ranks after losing members to the Big East, which had lost members to the ACC. Four WAC schools, former SWC schools Rice and SMU, as well as Tulsa and UTEP, joined Conference USA. In response, the WAC added Idaho, New Mexico State, and Utah State—all former Big West schools which left the conference in 2000 along with Boise State when that conference dropped football. The three new schools were all land grant universities, bringing the conference total to five (Nevada and Hawaii).

=== 2010s: Membership changes and the elimination of football ===
The decade of the 2010s began with a series of conference realignment moves that would have trickle-down effects throughout Division I football, and profoundly change the membership of the WAC. Boise State decided to move to the Mountain West Conference (MWC) for the 2011–12 season, and to replace departing BYU, the MWC also recruited WAC members Fresno State and Nevada for 2012–13. WAC commissioner Karl Benson courted several schools to replace those leaving, including the University of Montana, which declined, as well as the University of Denver, University of Texas at San Antonio (UTSA), and Texas State University-San Marcos, which all accepted effective 2012–13.

But the resulting eastward shift of the conference's geographic center led Hawaii to reduce travel expenses by becoming a football-only member of the MWC and joining the California-based Big West Conference for all other sports. Further invitations were then issued by the WAC to Seattle University and the University of Texas at Arlington. These changes meant that the conference would have 10 members for 2012–13, seven of which sponsored football, and Benson announced that the WAC planned to add two additional football-playing members to begin competition in 2013. A further boost came when Boise State decided to join the Big East in football, and return to the WAC in most other sports, as of the 2013–14 academic year. So by the end of 2011, the WAC seemed to have weathered the latest round of conference changes, and once again reinvented itself for the future.

But from this seemingly strong position, early 2012 brought forth a series of moves that shook the conference to its very core, beginning with Utah State and San Jose State accepting offers to join the MWC. Four similar announcements followed with UTSA and Louisiana Tech jumping to Conference USA, plus Texas State and UT Arlington heading to the Sun Belt Conference, all as of 2013–14. Boise State also canceled plans to rejoin the WAC, instead opting to place its non-football sports in the Big West Conference, before eventually deciding to simply remain in the MWC. These changes left the WAC's viability as a Division I football conference in grave doubt. The two remaining football-playing members, New Mexico State and Idaho, began making plans to compete in future seasons as FBS Independents; they ultimately spent only the 2013 season as independents, rejoining their one-time football home of the Sun Belt as football-only members in 2014.

In order to rebuild, as well as forestall further defections, the conference was forced to add two schools—Utah Valley University and CSU Bakersfield—which were invited in October 2012 to join the WAC in 2013–14, but this did not prevent two more members from leaving. Denver decided to take most of its athletic teams to The Summit League as of the 2013–14 season, shortly after Idaho opted to return all of its non-football sports to the Big Sky Conference in 2014–15. The conference responded over the next two months by adding Grand Canyon University, Chicago State University, and the University of Texas-Pan American. Then, in February 2013, the WAC announced the University of Missouri–Kansas City would join in the summer of 2013 as well. These changes would put the conference's membership at eight members by 2014 with only one, New Mexico State, having been in the WAC just three years earlier. Due to losing the majority of its football-playing members, the WAC would stop sponsoring the sport after the 2012–13 season, thereby becoming a non-football conference.

In 2013, the University of Texas System announced that Texas–Pan American would merge with the University of Texas at Brownsville; the new institution, the University of Texas Rio Grande Valley (UTRGV), began operation for the 2015–16 school year. UTRGV inherited UTPA's athletic program and WAC membership.

In January 2017, California Baptist University announced it would transition from NCAA Division II and join the WAC in 2018.

In November 2017, Cal State Bakersfield announced it would accept an invitation to the Big West and join its new conference in 2020.

In January 2019, Dixie State University, now known as Utah Tech University, announced it would move its athletics to Division I and join the WAC in 2020.

In June 2019, the University of Missouri–Kansas City announced it would leave the WAC to join the Summit League in 2020; this announcement came shortly before the rebranding of its athletic program as the Kansas City Roos.

In September 2019, Tarleton State University of Division II announced that it would move to Division I and join the WAC in 2020.

=== 2020s: More membership changes, reinstatement of football ===
Locations of WAC full members beginning in 2023 (Blue: Pre-2021, Red: Joined in 2021; Yellow: Joined in 2022)

On January 14, 2021, the Western Athletic Conference announced its intention to reinstate football as a conference-sponsored sport at the FCS level, as well as the addition of five new members to the conference in all sports, including football, at a press conference held at the NRG Center in Houston, Texas. The new members announced included four Southland Conference members from Texas in Abilene Christian University, Lamar University, Sam Houston State University, and Stephen F. Austin State University, which would soon be dubbed the "Texas Four", plus Southern Utah University from the Big Sky Conference. The conference also announced that it would most likely add another member that fielded a football team at a later date. While the WAC originally announced that all new members would join on July 1, 2022, commissioner Jeff Hurd later said that the arrival of the Texas Four "was expedited" to July 1, 2021. The conference officially confirmed this on January 21, 2021, adding that the relaunch of football was moved forward to fall 2021. The conference also confirmed media reports that the Southland had expelled the Texas Four after they announced their departure. Southern Utah entered as scheduled in 2022. During the aforementioned press conference, Hurd also announced that the WAC would split into two divisions for all sports except football and men's and women's basketball. One division will consist of the six Texas schools (the Texas Four plus existing members Tarleton and UTRGV). Also on January 14, 2021, news broke that UTRGV, a non-football playing member of the conference, had committed to create an FCS football program by 2024, plans that ultimately were postponed to 2025.

The WAC's planned reestablishment of a football conference at the FCS level was accompanied by speculation that the conference intended to eventually move its football league back up to the FBS level in the future, possibly by 2030. Later in January 2021, the WAC moved the start of its sponsorship of FCS football to Fall 2021, with media reports indicating that the University of Central Arkansas, Eastern Kentucky University, and Jacksonville State University would be added as football affiliates for 2021. The three schools were set to join the ASUN Conference in July 2021; that league planned to add FCS football, but not until at least 2022. The entry of the three incoming ASUN members into the new football league was officially confirmed at a February 23, 2021, ASUN press conference. These schools joined the Texas Four in a round-robin schedule officially branded interchangeably as the "ASUN–WAC Challenge" and "WAC–ASUN Challenge"; the two conferences proposed an amendment to NCAA bylaws that would allow their partnership (and presumably any others of its kind) to receive an immediate FCS playoff berth. Utah Tech (formerly Dixie State) and Tarleton State were included in alliance members' schedules, but were not eligible for the FCS playoffs until completing their Division I transitions in 2024; at least for 2021, games involving those two schools did not count in alliance standings, although both were included in the separate WAC league table.

On the same day as the WAC's initial FCS football announcement, Chicago State University announced it would leave the WAC in June 2022. Chicago State was originally added in 2013 along with the University of Missouri–Kansas City, originally with an intention for both institutions to serve as anchors for a midwestern-centered division for the conference. No other universities in the region were added to the WAC, and UMKC (now known for athletic purposes as Kansas City) departed the conference in 2020 for its former home of the Summit League. This left Chicago State, which did not sponsor football until 2026, as the only WAC member east of Texas. Chicago State's departure rendered Seattle University as the only WAC member institution not geographically located in the southwestern United States.

On November 5, 2021, it was reported that New Mexico State and Sam Houston would be leaving the WAC for Conference USA in 2023. The WAC responded by adding Incarnate Word from the Southland Conference and UT Arlington from the Sun Belt Conference; however, UIW later reversed course and decided to stay with the SLC only days before the 2022-23 athletic season officially began. Lamar also announced that it too would return to its former home of the Southland Conference in 2023 roughly three months prior to UIW's announcement, on April 8, 2022; however, three months later, it was announced that the SLC and Lamar would be accelerating the rejoining process so that Lamar could return for the 2022 athletic season instead.

Jacksonville State and Sam Houston both started FBS transitions in the 2022 season, rendering both ineligible for the FCS playoffs and also dropping both the ASUN and WAC to 5 playoff-eligible football members, one short of the six required for an automatic playoff berth. This led the WAC and ASUN to renew their football partnership for the 2022 season. Both conferences would keep their own 2022 football standings, including the ineligible teams, while the eligible teams also competed as an alliance to determine their joint AQ.

ESPN reported on December 9, 2022 that the WAC and ASUN had agreed to form a new football-only conference to start play in 2024. The initial membership would consist of Abilene Christian, Southern Utah, Stephen F. Austin, Tarleton, and Utah Tech from the WAC, plus Austin Peay, Central Arkansas, Eastern Kentucky, and North Alabama from the ASUN. UTRGV would become the 10th member upon its planned addition of football in 2025. The new football conference also reportedly planned to move "from what is currently known as FCS football to what is currently known as FBS football at the earliest practicable date." On December 20, the two conferences announced that their joint football league would start a year earlier, in 2023, under the tentative name of "ASUN–WAC Football Conference,” playing a six-game schedule in 2023 before starting full round-robin conference play in 2024. Neither conference's official announcement mentioned any plans to move to FBS. On April 17, 2023, the football league announced its permanent name of United Athletic Conference.

=== Near-dissolution and rebranding ===
United Athletic Conference Members
— Full member
— Full, non-football member
— Affiliate member

In the mid-2020s, the Western Athletic Conference experienced significant membership turnover. In 2024, UTRGV and Stephen F. Austin announced that they would depart for the Southland Conference, and later that year Grand Canyon and Seattle accepted invitations to join the West Coast Conference, with Grand Canyon subsequently redirecting to the Mountain West Conference. After the change in destinations, GCU planned to transition from the WAC to the Mountain West on July 1, 2026, but ultimately made the move a year earlier, leaving the WAC with seven members for 2025–26.

In February 2025, rumors began circulating about California Baptist and Utah Valley departing the WAC for the Big West Conference. California Baptist made the move official on March 5, followed by Utah Valley on June 4, in both cases to take effect July 1, 2026. Three weeks later, on June 25, Southern Utah and Utah Tech accepted offers to join the Big Sky Conference, with the same effective date, leaving the WAC with just three members to continue beyond 2025–26.

On June 26, 2025, the WAC and the Atlantic Sun Conference issued a joint announcement of a strategic realignment to take effect on July 1, 2026. As part of the agreement, the WAC adopted the name United Athletic Conference and was intended to serve as the multi-sport home for the institutions of both conferences that play scholarship football in FCS, (Note: Two football-playing institutions from the pre-2026 ASUN membership remain in that conference. Stetson plays in FCS but does not award football scholarships. Bellarmine plays the weight-restricted and non-NCAA variant of sprint football.) plus UT Arlington. This slightly changed when West Florida started its transition from Division II in 2026; while it plays UAC football, it is otherwise an ASUN member. The ASUN–WAC alliance was later unveiled as Unisun Sports. The ASUN continues to operate as a non-football conference under its existing identity, while the UAC maintains the WAC's NCAA Division I status, automatic qualification rights, and historical continuity. This rebranding is separate from the football-only United Athletic Conference that operated from 2021 to 2025.

On October 10, 2025, the University of Arkansas at Little Rock (branded as Little Rock for athletics) announced it would leave the Ohio Valley Conference and join the UAC effective July 1, 2026, giving the league nine members (seven football-playing schools) for its first year under its new identity.

In February 2026, the WAC, during its transition into the UAC, filed a $1 million lawsuit against Utah Valley University after the university declined to pay its contractually required exit fee following its approved departure to the Big West Conference. The dispute arose when it allegedly failed to submit the agreed-upon payment by the January 31 deadline. Conference officials stated that UVU sent a letter formally notifying the WAC that it would not pay the exit fee. According to the conference, the nonpayment placed UVU “not in good standing” under WAC bylaws, a designation that can include loss of voting privileges, removal from conference governance participation, exclusion from WAC championships and awards, and restrictions on conference-controlled media distribution such as ESPN+ broadcasts, pending resolution of the financial obligation.

Locations of past, current & future WAC/UAC members:
– Current member
– Future member
– Former full member
– Former affiliate member
– Affiliate member

== Member schools ==
=== Full members ===
Institution	Location	Founded	Type	Enrollment	Endowment (millions)	Nickname	Joined (Note: Represents the calendar year when fall sports competition begins.)	Colors
Abilene Christian University	Abilene, Texas	1906	Churches of Christ	6,730	$824.0	Wildcats	2021	
Austin Peay State University	Clarksville, Tennessee	1927	Public	9,609	$79.3	Governors	2026	
University of Central Arkansas	Conway, Arkansas	1907	Public	10,123	$68.6	Bears	2026	
Eastern Kentucky University	Richmond, Kentucky	1874	Public	13,984	$107.0	Colonels	2026	
University of Arkansas at Little Rock (Little Rock)	Little Rock, Arkansas	1927	Public	8,026	$144.56	Trojans	2026	
University of North Alabama	Florence, Alabama	1830	Public	11,056	$54.4	Lions	2026	
Tarleton State University (Tarleton)	Stephenville, Texas	1899	Public (TAMUS)	13,996	$42.0	Texans	2020	
University of Texas at Arlington (UT Arlington)	Arlington, Texas	1895	Public (UTS)	42,863	$218.0	Mavericks	2012	
University of Texas at Arlington (UT Arlington)	Arlington, Texas	1895	Public (UTS)	42,863	$218.0	Mavericks	2022 (Note: Texas–Arlington (now UT Arlington) was a non-football full member during the 2012–13 school year; left the conference right after, before rejoining in 2022–23.)	
University of West Georgia	Carrollton, Georgia	1906	Public	14,394	$60.1	Wolves	2026	

=== Affiliate members ===
These schools field programs in the UAC for sports not sponsored by their primary conferences:

Institution	Location	Founded	Type	Enrollment	Nickname	Joined (Note: Represents the calendar year when fall sports competition begins.)	UAC sport(s)	Primary conference
University of West Florida	Pensacola, Florida	1963	Public	14,343	Argonauts	2026	Football	Atlantic Sun (ASUN)

=== Former full members ===
The WAC/UAC has had more than 40 former full members:

Institution	Location	Founded	Type	Enrollment	Nickname	Joined (Note: Represents the calendar year when fall sports competition begins.)	Left (Note: Represents the calendar year when spring sports competition ends.)	Current primary conference
United States Air Force Academy (Air Force)	USAF Academy, Colorado (Note: The Academy is outside of the Colorado Springs city limits, and is its own entity for both census and postal purposes.)	1954	Federal	4,413	Falcons	1980	1999	Mountain West (MW)
University of Arizona	Tucson, Arizona	1885	Public	39,236	Wildcats	1962	1978	Big 12
Arizona State University	Tempe, Arizona	1885	Public	59,794	Sun Devils	1962	1978	Big 12
Boise State University	Boise, Idaho	1932	Public	22,678	Broncos	2001	2011	Pac-12
Brigham Young University (BYU)	Provo, Utah	1875	LDS	34,130	Cougars	1962	1999	Big 12
California Baptist University (Cal Baptist)	Riverside, California	1950	Baptist	12,466	Lancers	2018	2026	Big West (BWC)
California State University, Bakersfield (Cal State Bakersfield)	Bakersfield, California	1965	Public	10,500	Roadrunners	2013	2020	Big West (BWC)
California State University, Fresno (Fresno State)	Fresno, California	1911	Public	22,565	Bulldogs	1992	2012	Pac-12
Chicago State University	Chicago, Illinois	1867	Public (TMCF)	2,620	Cougars	2013	2022	Northeast (NEC)
Colorado State University	Fort Collins, Colorado	1870	Public	28,417	Rams	1968 (Note: The Colorado State men's basketball team joined the WAC a year after it became a full member for other sports (1969–70).)	1999	Pac-12
University of Denver	Denver, Colorado	1864	Private	11,476	Pioneers	2012	2013	West Coast (WCC)
Grand Canyon University	Phoenix, Arizona	1949	For-profit (Note: For-profit status is disputed. The U.S. Department of Education considers GCU for-profit, but the Internal Revenue Service, the state of Arizona, and the NCAA all consider it nonprofit.) (Non-denominational)	103,427	Antelopes	2013	2025	Mountain West (MW)
University of Hawaiʻi at Mānoa (Hawaiʻi)	Honolulu, Hawaii	1907	Public	20,435	Rainbow Warriors & Rainbow Wahine	1979	2012	Mountain West (MW)
University of Idaho	Moscow, Idaho	1889	Public	12,312	Vandals	2005	2014	Big Sky (BSC)
University of Missouri–Kansas City (Kansas City)	Kansas City, Missouri	1933	Public	16,944	Roos	2013	2020	Summit
Lamar University	Beaumont, Texas	1923	Public	17,898	Cardinals & Lady Cardinals	2021	2022	Southland (SLC)
Louisiana Tech University	Ruston, Louisiana	1894	Public	11,581	Bulldogs & Lady Techsters	2001	2013	Sun Belt (SBC)
University of Nevada, Las Vegas (UNLV)	Las Vegas, Nevada (Note: UNLV is outside of the Las Vegas city limits, but has a Las Vegas mailing address.)	1957	Public	28,203	Rebels	1996	1999	Mountain West (MW)
University of Nevada, Reno (Nevada)	Reno, Nevada	1874	Public	18,227	Wolf Pack	2000	2012	Mountain West (MW)
University of New Mexico	Albuquerque, New Mexico	1889	Public	35,211	Lobos	1962	1999	Mountain West (MW)
New Mexico State University	Las Cruces, New Mexico	1888	Public	21,694	Aggies	2005	2023	Conf. USA (CUSA)
Rice University	Houston, Texas	1912	Nonsectarian	6,082	Owls	1996	2005	American
San Diego State University	San Diego, California	1897	Public	28,789	Aztecs	1978	1999	Pac-12
Sam Houston State University (Sam Houston)	Huntsville, Texas	1879	Public	21,679	Bearkats	2021	2023	Conf. USA (CUSA)
San Jose State University	San Jose, California	1857	Public	30,448	Spartans	1996	2013	Mountain West (MW)
Seattle University	Seattle, Washington	1891	Catholic (Jesuit)	7,755	Redhawks	2012	2025	West Coast (WCC)
Southern Methodist University (SMU)	Dallas, Texas (Note: Virtually all of the SMU campus, including all athletic facilities, is in University Park, a city contained within the Dallas city limits. The U.S. Postal Service considers all locations in University Park to have a Dallas address.)	1911	United; Methodist	12,000	Mustangs	1996	2005	Atlantic Coast (ACC)
Southern Utah University	Cedar City, Utah	1897	Public	15,000	Thunderbirds	2022	2026	Big Sky (BSC)
Stephen F. Austin State University (Stephen F. Austin)	Nacogdoches, Texas	1923	Public (UTS)	11,946	Lumberjacks & Ladyjacks	2021	2024	Southland (SLC)
Texas Christian University (TCU)	Fort Worth, Texas	1873	Disciples of Christ	9,725	Horned Frogs	1996	2001	Big 12
University of Texas at El Paso (UTEP)	El Paso, Texas	1914	Public	21,011	Miners	1968 (Note: The UTEP men's basketball team joined the WAC a year after it became a full member for other sports (1969–70).)	2005	Mountain West (MW)
University of Texas Rio Grande Valley (UTRGV)	Edinburg, Texas	2013 (Note: While UTRGV was formally founded in 2013, with instruction starting in 2015, the athletic program traces its history through the University of Texas–Pan American (UTPA), which joined the WAC in 2013 and was one of the two institutions merged into UTRGV. The UTRGV athletic program inherited UTPA's Division I and WAC memberships.)	Public (UTS)	32,419	Vaqueros	2013	2024	Southland (SLC)
University of Texas at San Antonio (UTSA)	San Antonio, Texas	1969	Public	30,474	Roadrunners	2012	2013	American
Texas State University	San Marcos, Texas	1899	Public	34,229	Bobcats	2012	2013	Pac-12
University of Tulsa	Tulsa, Oklahoma	1894	Presbyterian (PCUSA)	4,352	Golden Hurricane	1996	2005	American
University of Utah	Salt Lake City, Utah	1850	Public	32,388	Utes	1962	1999	Big 12
Utah State University	Logan, Utah	1888	Public	28,796	Aggies	2005	2013	Pac-12
Utah Tech University	St. George, Utah	1911	Public	12,650	Trailblazers	2020	2026	Big Sky (BSC)
Utah Valley University	Orem, Utah	1941	Public	41,728	Wolverines	2013	2026	Big West (BWC)
University of Wyoming	Laramie, Wyoming	1886	Public	12,496	Cowboys & Cowgirls	1962	1999	Mountain West (MW)

=== Former affiliate members ===
Institution	Location	Founded	Type	Enrollment	Nickname	Joined (Note: Represents the calendar year when fall sports competition begins.)	Left (Note: Represents the calendar year when spring sports competition ends.)	WAC sport(s)	Primary conference
United States Air Force Academy (Air Force) (Note: Four schools (three of which are former WAC full members: Air Force, UNLV, and Wyoming; and North Dakota) became affiliate members in men's swimming and diving in July 2013; the WAC announced on May 16, 2013, that it would reinstate the sport, which it had sponsored from 1962 to 2000.) (Note: The WAC ceased sponsoring men's swimming and diving once again after the 2024–25 school year, when Grand Canyon and Seattle moved their programs to the Big West Conference and California Baptist, Air Force, UNLV, Idaho, New Mexico State, Northern Arizona, Northern Colorado and Wyoming moved their programs to the Mountain Pacific Sports Federation (MPSF). Air Force, UNLV, and Wyoming moved their programs again in 2026–27 when their full-time home of the Mountain West Conference began sponsoring men's swimming & diving.)	USAF Academy, Colorado (Note: Virtually all of the Academy grounds, including the cadet area and all athletic facilities, is outside the Colorado Springs city limits. The U.S. Census Bureau and U.S. Postal Service respectively designate the Academy as "Air Force Academy" and "USAF Academy".)	1955	Federal	4,413	Falcons	2013	2025	Men's swimming	Mountain West (MW) (Note: Air Force was a full member of the WAC from 1980–81 to 1998–99.)
United States Air Force Academy (Air Force)	USAF Academy, Colorado	1955	Federal	4,413	Falcons	2013	2025	Men's soccer	Mountain West (MW)
Boise State University	Boise, Idaho	1932	Public	22,678	Broncos	1990	1993	Women's gymnastics	Pac-12 (Note: Boise State was a full member of the WAC from 2001–02 to 2010–11.)
Boise State University	Boise, Idaho	1932	Public	22,678	Broncos	2012	2013	Women's gymnastics	Pac-12
California Polytechnic State University, San Luis Obispo (Cal Poly)	San Luis Obispo, California	1901	Public	20,186	Mustangs	1994	1996	Baseball	Big West (BWC)
California State University, Bakersfield (Cal State Bakersfield)	Bakersfield, California	1965	Public	8,720	Roadrunners	2012	2013	Baseball	Big West (BWC) (Note: Cal State–Bakersfield was a full member of the WAC from 2013–14 to 2019–20.)
California State University, Bakersfield (Cal State Bakersfield)	Bakersfield, California	1965	Public	8,720	Roadrunners	2012	2013	Women's swimming	Big West (BWC)
California State University, Fullerton (Cal State Fullerton)	Fullerton, California	1959	Public	38,128	Titans	2005	2011	Women's gymnastics	Big West (BWC) (Note: Cal State–Fullerton no longer sponsors women's gymnastics.)
California State University, Northridge (Cal State Northridge, CSUN)	Northridge, California	1958	Public	38,310	Matadors	1992	1996	Baseball	Big West (BWC)
California State University, Sacramento (Sacramento State)	Sacramento, California	1947	Public	27,972	Hornets	2005	2013	Women's gymnastics	Big West (BWC) (Note: The Big West Conference does not sponsor women's gymnastics. Sacramento State houses that sport in the Mountain Pacific Sports Federation (MPSF).)
Dallas Baptist University	Dallas, Texas	1898	Baptist	5,422	Patriots	2012	2013	Baseball	Lone Star (LSC) (Note: Currently an NCAA Division II athletic conference.) (Note: Dallas Baptist baseball competes as a single-sport member of the Pac-12 Conference.)
University of Denver	Denver, Colorado	1864	Nonsectarian (Note: Though founded by Methodists, Denver has been a nonsectarian institution since its founding.)	11,476	Pioneers	2011	2012	Women's gymnastics	West Coast (WCC) (Note: The WCC does not sponsor women's gymnastics; therefore Denver houses that sport in the Big 12 Conference.) (Note: Denver was a full member of the WAC for the 2012–13 school year.)
Drury University	Springfield, Missouri	1873	UCC & DOC	5,474	Panthers	1999	2000	Men's soccer	Great Lakes Valley (SLVC)
Grand Canyon University	Phoenix, Arizona	1949	For-profit (Note: For-profit status is disputed.)	17,650	Antelopes	1994	1998	Baseball	Mountain West (MW) (Note: Grand Canyon was a full member of the WAC from 2013–14 to 2024–25; but left the conference for the Mountain West Conference in 2025. The MW began sponsoring men's soccer in 2026–27 with GCU as an inaugural member.)
Grand Canyon University	Phoenix, Arizona	1949	For-profit	17,650	Antelopes	2025	2026	Men's soccer	Mountain West (MW)
University of Hawai'i at Hilo (Hawai'i–Hilo)	Hilo, Hawaii	1901	Public	20,186	Vulcans	1999	2001	Baseball	Pacific West (PacWest)
Houston Christian University (Note: Formerly known as Houston Baptist University when it became a WAC affiliate. The name changed in September 2022.)	Houston, Texas	1960	Baptist	2,567	Huskies	2013	2024	Men's soccer	Southland (Note: The Southland Conference does not sponsor men's soccer; thus Houston Christian and Incarnate Word house that sport in the Ohio Valley Conference (OVC).)
University of Idaho (Note: The WAC ceased sponsoring women's swimming and diving after the 2024–25 school year. All WAC affiliates for that sport moved their respective programs to the Mountain Pacific Sports Federation (MPSF), beginning in 2025–26.)	Moscow, Idaho	1889	Public	12,312	Vandals	2014	2025	Women's swimming	Big Sky (BSC) (Note: Idaho was a full member of the WAC from 2005–06 to 2013–14.)
University of the Incarnate Word	San Antonio, Texas	1881	Catholic (C.C.V.I.)	8,455	Cardinals	2014	2023	Men's soccer	Southland (SLC)
University of Nevada, Las Vegas (UNLV)	Las Vegas, Nevada (Note: The UNLV campus is outside of the Las Vegas city limits in the unincorporated community of Paradise. The U.S. Postal Service considers all unincorporated areas in the Las Vegas Valley, including Paradise, to have a Las Vegas address.)	1889	Public	29,069	Rebels	2013	2025	Men's swimming	Mountain West (MW) (Note: UNLV was a full member of the WAC from 1996–97 to 1998–99.)
University of Nevada, Las Vegas (UNLV)	Las Vegas, Nevada	1889	Public	29,069	Rebels	2013	2025	Men's soccer	Mountain West (MW)
New Mexico State University	Las Cruces, New Mexico	1888	Public	21,694	Aggies	2023	2025	Women's swimming	Conf. USA (CUSA) (Note: New Mexico State was a full member of the WAC from 2005–06 to 2022–23.)
Northern Arizona University	Flagstaff, Arizona	1899	Public	18,824	Lumberjacks	2004	2025	Women's swimming	Big Sky (BSC)
University of Northern Colorado	Greeley, Colorado	1889	Public	10,097	Bears	2012	2025	Women's swimming	Big Sky (BSC) (Note: Northern Colorado baseball joined the Summit League after the 2021 spring season (2020–21 school year).)
University of Northern Colorado	Greeley, Colorado	1889	Public	10,097	Bears	2013	2021	Baseball	Big Sky (BSC)
University of North Dakota	Grand Forks, North Dakota	1883	Public	15,250	Fighting Hawks	2013	2016	Baseball	Summit (Note: North Dakota no longer sponsors any of the sports it housed in the WAC.)
University of North Dakota	Grand Forks, North Dakota	1883	Public	15,250	Fighting Hawks	2013	2017	Men's swimming	Summit
University of North Dakota	Grand Forks, North Dakota	1883	Public	15,250	Fighting Hawks	2011	2017	Women's swimming	Summit
University of San Diego	San Diego, California	1949	Catholic (Diocese of San Diego)	8,105	Toreros	2004	2010	Women's swimming	West Coast (WCC) (Note: The WCC does not sponsor women's swimming & diving; thus San Diego houses that sport in the Mountain Pacific Sports Federation (MPSF).)
San Diego State University	San Diego, California	1897	Public	28,789	Aztecs	2024	2025	Men's soccer	Pac-12 (Note: San Diego State was a full member of the WAC from 1978–79 to 1998–99.)
San Jose State University	San Jose, California	1857	Public	30,448	Spartans	2013	2025	Men's soccer	Mountain West (MW) (Note: San Jose State was a full member of the WAC from 1996–97 to 2012–13.)
Southern Utah University	Cedar City, Utah	1897	Public	8,297	Thunderbirds	1990	1993	Women's gymnastics	Big Sky (BSC) (Note: Southern Utah was a full member of the WAC from 2022–23 to 2025–26.) (Note: Southern Utah women's gymnastics currently competes in the Pac-12 Conference.)
Southern Utah University	Cedar City, Utah	1897	Public	8,297	Thunderbirds	2005	2013	Women's gymnastics	Big Sky (BSC)
University of Texas Rio Grande Valley (UTRGV)	Edinburg, Texas	2013 (Note: While UTRGV was formally founded in 2013, with instruction starting in 2015, the athletic program traces its history through the University of Texas–Pan American (UTPA), which joined the WAC in 2013 and was one of the two institutions merged into UTRGV. The UTRGV athletic program inherited UTPA's Division I and WAC memberships.)	Public (UTS)	32,419	Vaqueros	2024	2025	Men's soccer (Note: UTRGV men's soccer was an Independent during the 2025 fall season (2025–26 school year), and joined the Ohio Valley Conference in the 2026 fall season (2026–27 school year).)	Southland (SLC) (Note: Texas–Rio Grande Valley (UTRGV) was a full member of the WAC from 2013–14 to 2023–24.)
University of Texas Rio Grande Valley (UTRGV)	Edinburg, Texas	2013	Public (UTS)	32,419	Vaqueros	2024	2025	Women's swimming	Southland (SLC)
University of Wyoming	Laramie, Wyoming	1886	Public	12,496	Cowboys	2013	2025	Men's swimming	Mountain West (MW) (Note: Wyoming was a full member of the WAC from 1962–63 to 1998–99.)

=== Membership timeline ===
Full member (all sports) Full member (non-football) Associate member (football) Associate member (sport) Independent Other Conference Other Conference

- Prior to the 1996–97 season, both Air Force and Hawaii had most to all of their women's sports competing in other conferences before joining their men's sports counterparts in the WAC. At that time, Air Force competed in the Colorado Athletic Conference and Hawaii the Big West Conference.
- Utah Tech was known as Dixie State prior to 2022.

From 2021–22 to 2023–24, the WAC played football at the FCS level.

== Commissioners ==
Years	Commissioners
1962–1968	Paul Brechler
1968–1971	Wiles Hallock
1971–1980	Stan Bates
1980–1994	Joseph Kearney
1994–2012	Karl Benson
2012–2021	Jeff Hurd
2021–2024	Brian Thornton
2025–Present	Rebekah Ray

== Sports ==
The United Athletic Conference currently sponsors championship competition in 7 men's and 9 women's NCAA-sanctioned sports. One other school is currently an associate member in football.

Teams in United Athletic Conference competition
Sport	Men's	Women's
Baseball	9	–
Basketball	9	9
Cross country	9	9
Football	8	–
Golf	9	9
Soccer	–	9
Softball	–	8
Tennis	–	6
Track and field (indoor)	8	9
Track and field (outdoor)	8	9
Volleyball	–	9

=== Men's sponsored sports by school ===
School	Baseball	Basketball	Cross Country	Football	Golf	Track & Field (Indoor)	Track & Field (Outdoor)	Total UAC Sports
Abilene Christian	Yes	Yes	Yes	Yes	Yes	Yes	Yes	7
Austin Peay	Yes	Yes	Yes	Yes	Yes	No	No	5
Central Arkansas	Yes	Yes	Yes	Yes	Yes	Yes	Yes	7
Eastern Kentucky	Yes	Yes	Yes	Yes	Yes	Yes	Yes	7
Little Rock	Yes	Yes	Yes	No	Yes	Yes	Yes	6
North Alabama	Yes	Yes	Yes	Yes	Yes	Yes	Yes	7
Tarleton State	Yes	Yes	Yes	Yes	Yes	Yes	Yes	7
UT Arlington	Yes	Yes	Yes	No	Yes	Yes	Yes	6
West Georgia	Yes	Yes	Yes	Yes	Yes	Yes	Yes	7
Associate Members
West Florida				Yes				1
Totals	9	9	9	8	9	8	8	60

Men's varsity sports not sponsored by the United Athletic Conference which are played by UAC schools

School	Soccer	Tennis	Wrestling
Abilene Christian	No	ASUN	No
Austin Peay	No	ASUN	No
Central Arkansas	ASUN	No	No
Eastern Kentucky	No	ASUN	No
Little Rock	No	No	Pac-12
North Alabama	No	ASUN	No
UT Arlington	No	ASUN	No

=== Women's sponsored sports by school ===
School	Basketball	Cross Country	Golf	Soccer	Softball	Tennis	Track & Field (Indoor)	Track & Field (Outdoor)	Volleyball	Total WAC Sports
Abilene Christian	Yes	Yes	Yes	Yes	Yes	Yes	Yes	Yes	Yes	9
Austin Peay	Yes	Yes	Yes	Yes	Yes	Yes	Yes	Yes	Yes	9
Central Arkansas	Yes	Yes	Yes	Yes	Yes	No	Yes	Yes	Yes	8
Eastern Kentucky	Yes	Yes	Yes	Yes	Yes	Yes	Yes	Yes	Yes	9
Little Rock	Yes	Yes	Yes	Yes	No	No	Yes	Yes	Yes	7
North Alabama	Yes	Yes	Yes	Yes	Yes	Yes	Yes	Yes	Yes	9
Tarleton State	Yes	Yes	Yes	Yes	Yes	Yes	Yes	Yes	Yes	9
UT Arlington	Yes	Yes	Yes	No	Yes	Yes	Yes	Yes	Yes	8
West Georgia	Yes	Yes	Yes	Yes	Yes	No	Yes	Yes	Yes	8
Totals	9	9	9	8	8	6	9	9	9	67

Women's varsity sports not sponsored by the United Athletic Conference which are played by UAC schools

School	Beach Volleyball	Flag Football (Note: Part of the NCAA Emerging Sports for Women program.)	Lacrosse	Stunt (Note: Graduated from the NCAA Emerging Sports for Women program to full championship status in January 2026, with the first NCAA championship set for 2026–27.)	Swimming and Diving
Austin Peay	ASUN	No	ASUN	No	No
Central Arkansas	ASUN	No	No	Independent	No
Eastern Kentucky	ASUN	No	No	No	No
Little Rock	No	No	No	No	ASUN
North Alabama	ASUN	Independent	No	No	No
Tarleton State	ASUN	No	No	No	No
UT Arlington	No	Independent	No	No	No

== Football ==
The WAC sponsored football from its founding in 1962 through the 2012 season. However, the defection of all but two football-playing schools to other conferences caused the conference to drop sponsorship after fifty-one years.

=== Reinstatement ===
On January 14, 2021, the WAC announced its intention to reinstate football as a conference-sponsored sport at the FCS level, as well as the addition of five new members to the conference in all sports, including football. The new members announced include the "Texas Four" of Abilene Christian University, Lamar University, Sam Houston State University, and Stephen F. Austin State University, then members of the Southland Conference, along with Southern Utah University, currently of the Big Sky Conference. Originally, all schools were planned to join in July 2022, but the entry of the Texas Four was moved to July 2021 after the Southland expelled its departing members. The WAC also announced that it would most likely add another football-playing institution at a later date.

On the same day, news broke that the University of Texas Rio Grande Valley, a non-football playing WAC member, had committed to create an FCS football program by 2024. The program will most likely compete as part of the newly-reinstated WAC football conference.

The WAC ultimately partnered with the ASUN Conference to reestablish its football league, with the Texas Four being joined by three incoming ASUN members for at least the fall 2021 season in what it calls the ASUN–WAC (or WAC–ASUN) Challenge. The Challenge was abbreviated as "AQ7", as the top finisher of the seven teams would be an automatic qualifier for the FCS postseason. The two conferences renewed their alliance for the 2022 season, although both leagues will conduct separate conference seasons and then choose the alliance's automatic qualifier by an as-yet-undetermined process. Both the WAC and ASUN initially planned to have 6 playoff-eligible teams in 2022, but each lost such a member with the start of FBS transitions by Jacksonville State and Sam Houston.

The WAC had been speculated to move back up to FBS following the reestablishment of the football conference at the FCS level.

As noted previously, further conference realignment led to a full merger of the ASUN and WAC football leagues, with the new United Athletic Conference (football) starting play in 2023 and then merging into the rebranded WAC in 2026.

== Men's basketball ==
This list goes through the 2024–25 season.

Team	First season	All-Time record	All-Time win %	NCAA DI Tournament appearances	NCAA DI Tournament record	Arena	Head coach
Abilene Christian	1919	1290–1220	.514	2	1–2	Moody Coliseum	Brette Tanner
Austin Peay	1929	1298–1188	.522	7	2–8	F&M Bank Arena	Corey Gipson
Central Arkansas	1920	1526–1218	.556	0	0–0	Farris Center	John Shulman
Eastern Kentucky	1909	1375–1263–2	.521	8	0–8	Alumni Coliseum	A. W. Hamilton
Little Rock	1967	883–802	.524	5	2–5	Jack Stephens Center	Travis Ford
North Alabama	1931	1229–1018	.547	0	0–0	Flowers Hall	Tony Pujol
Tarleton State	1961	951–855	.527	0	0–0	EECU Center	Eric Haut
UT Arlington	1959	830–1038	.444	1	0–1	College Park Center	K. T. Turner
West Georgia	1957	1042–790	.569	0	0–0	The Coliseum	Dave Moore

UAC tournament

Rivalries

Men's basketball rivalries involving WAC teams include:

Teams		Meetings	Record	Series Leader	Current Streak
UT Arlington	Texas State	80	41-39	UT Arlington	Texas State won 3
UT Arlington	Stephen F. Austin	65	34-31	UT Arlington	UT Arlington won 2
UT Arlington	North Texas	59 (since 1959)	33-26	North Texas	North Texas won 5

Awards

== Women's basketball ==
This list goes through the 2024–25 season.

Team	First season	All-Time record	All-Time win %	NCAA DI Tournament appearances	NCAA DI Tournament record	Arena	Head coach
Abilene Christian	1976	911–531	.632	1	0–1	Moody Coliseum	Julie Goodenough
Austin Peay	1970	668–852	.439	7	0–7	F&M Bank Arena	Brittany Young
Central Arkansas	1908	959–555	.633	2	0–2	Farris Center	Tony Kemper
Eastern Kentucky	1972	733–738	.498	2	0–2	Alumni Coliseum	Greg Todd
Little Rock	1981	496–466	.515	6	2–6	Jack Stephens Center	Steve Wiedower
North Alabama	1981	643–577	.527	0	0–0	Flowers Hall	Anna Nimz
Tarleton State	1994	470–408	.535	0	0–0	EECU Center	Bill Brock
UT Arlington	1972	770–751	.506	3	0–3	College Park Center	Shereka Wright
West Georgia	1983	590–548	.518	0	0–0	The Coliseum	Joanna Reitz

UAC tournament

Rivalries

Women's basketball rivalries involving WAC teams include:

Teams		Meetings	Record	Series Leader	Current Streak
UT Arlington	Texas State	79	37-42	Texas State	UT Arlington won 3
UT Arlington	Stephen F. Austin	70	21-49	Stephen F. Austin	UT Arlington won 2
UT Arlington	North Texas	61	31-30	UT Arlington	UT Arlington won 2

== Baseball ==
The UAC has claimed seven NCAA baseball national championships. The most recent UAC national champion is the 2008 Fresno State Bulldogs baseball team.

UAC tournament

== Championships ==
=== Current champions ===
- For the sports in which the WAC recognizes both regular-season and tournament champions:
  - (RS) indicates regular-season champion.
  - (T) indicates tournament champion.
- For other sports, only a tournament champion is recognized.
- Champions from a previous school year are indicated with the calendar year of their title.

Season	Sport	Men's champion	Women's champion
Fall 2025	Cross country	California Baptist	California Baptist
Fall 2025	Soccer	California Baptist (RS); Grand Canyon (T)	Utah Valley (RS); California Baptist (T)
Fall 2025	Volleyball	—	Utah Tech (RS); Utah Valley (RS & T)
Winter 2025–26	Indoor Track & Field	Utah Valley	Tarleton State
Winter 2025–26	Basketball	Utah Valley (RS); Cal Baptist (T)	Cal Baptist (RS & T)
Spring 2026	Golf	Tarleton State	Tarleton State
Spring 2026	Tennis	—	Tarleton State (RS & T)
Spring 2026	Softball	—	Cal Baptist (RS & T)
Spring 2026	Outdoor Track & Field	Tarleton State	Utah Valley
Spring 2026	Baseball	Tarleton State (RS & T)	—

=== National championships ===
The following teams have won NCAA national championships while being a member of the WAC:

- Arizona – baseball (1976)
- Arizona State – baseball (1965, 1967, 1969, 1977)
- BYU – men's track & field (shared the national title in 1970)
- BYU – men's golf (1981)
- BYU – women's cross country (1997)
- Fresno State – softball (1998)
- Fresno State – baseball (2008)
- Rice – baseball (2003)
- UTEP – NCAA Division I Men's Cross Country (1969, 1975, 1976, 1978, 1979, 1981)
- UTEP – NCAA Division I Men's Indoor Track and Field (1974,1975,1976,1978,1980,1981,1982)
- UTEP – NCAA Division I Men's Outdoor Track and Field (1975, 1978, 1979, 1980, 1981, 1982)
- UNLV – men's golf (1998)

The WAC has also produced one AP national champion in football:

- BYU (1984)

The following teams won AIAW (and forerunner DGWS) women's national championships while their universities were members of the WAC:

- Arizona State (15) – swimming (8), badminton (4), softball (2), golf (1)
- Utah (3) – cross country (Div. II), gymnastics, skiing
- UTEP (1) – indoor track and field

== Spending and revenue ==
Total revenue includes ticket sales, contributions and donations, rights/licensing, student fees, school funds and all other sources including TV income, camp income, food and novelties. Total expenses includes coaching/staff, scholarships, buildings/ground, maintenance, utilities and rental fees and all other costs including recruiting, team travel, equipment and uniforms, conference dues and insurance costs.

Conference Rank (2025)	Institution	2025 Total Revenue from Athletics	2025 Total Expenses on Athletics
1	Tarleton State	$34,277,745	$34,277,745
2	Austin Peay	$26,749,245	$26,749,245
3	Abilene Christian	$26,476,731	$26,476,731
4	Eastern Kentucky	$25,348,404	$25,348,404
5	UT Arlington	$18,699,446	$18,699,446
6	Central Arkansas	$17,748,955	$17,748,955
7	North Alabama	$16,041,806	$16,041,806
8	West Georgia	$13,230,120	$13,230,120
9	Little Rock	$12,718,000	$12,718,000

Notes
Note 1 - Data from U.S. Department of Education Equity in Athletics Data Analysis Cutting Tool Database. OPE Equity in Athletics Data Analysis Cutting Tool used in order to provide ranking for private institutions in the conference.
Note 2 - Non football programs

== Facilities ==
School	Football Stadium	Capacity	Basketball arena	Capacity	Soccer stadium	Capacity	Softball park	Capacity	Baseball park	Capacity
Abilene Christian	Anthony Field at Wildcat Stadium	12,000	Moody Coliseum	4,600	Elmer Gray Stadium	1,000	Poly Wells Field	1,000	Crutcher Scott Field	4,500
Austin Peay	Fortera Stadium	10,000	F&M Bank Arena	5,500	Morgan Brothers Field	800	Cheryl Holt Field	200	Raymond C. Hand Park	777
Central Arkansas	Estes Stadium	10,000	Farris Center	6,000	Bill Stephens Track/Soccer Complex	1,000	Farris Field	500	Bear Stadium	1,000
Eastern Kentucky	Roy Kidd Stadium	20,000	Baptist Health Arena	6,300	EKU Soccer Field	400	Gertrude Hood Field	400	Turkey Hughes Field	500
Little Rock	Non-football school		Jack Stephens Center	5,600	Coleman Sports Complex	300	Non-softball school		Gary Hogan Field	2,550
North Alabama	Bank Independent Stadium	TBA	Flowers Hall	3,900	Bill Jones Athletic Complex	—N/a	Hilda B. Anderson Softball Stadium	—N/a	Mike D. Lane Field	1,500
Tarleton State	Memorial Stadium	24,000	EECU Center	8,000	Tarleton Soccer Complex	—N/a	Tarleton Softball Complex	500	Cecil Ballow Baseball Complex	750
UT Arlington	Non-football school		College Park Center	7,000	Non-soccer school		Allan Saxe Field	622	Clay Gould Ballpark	1,600
West Georgia	University Stadium	10,000	The Coliseum	6,469	University Soccer Field	250	University Softball Field	500	Cole Field	500

Affiliate members
School	Football stadium	Capacity
West Florida	Darrell Gooden Stadium	4,000

== Awards ==
Commissioner's Cup

The WAC awards its Commissioner's Cup to the school that performs the best in each of the conference's 19 men's and women's championships.

Joe Kearney Award

Named in honor of former WAC commissioner Dr. Joseph Kearney, the awards are given annually to the top male and female WAC athlete. The various WAC member institutions Athletics Directors select the male award winner, while the WAC member institutions Senior Women's Administrators choose the female honoree.

Stan Bates Award

The award is named in honor of former WAC Commissioner Stan Bates and honors the WAC's top male and female scholar-athletes, recognizing the recipients' athletic and academic accomplishments. In addition, the awards carry a $3,000 postgraduate scholarship.

== Media ==
=== WAC Digital Network ===
In 2014–15, the WAC initiated a new digital network to give fans high quality streaming internet access to many of its regular season games and postseason championships including volleyball, soccer, swimming and diving, basketball, softball and baseball.
