= 2018 USA Team Handball College Nationals – Men's Division =

2018 College Nationals - Men's Division
- Season: 2017–18
- Dates: 20 - 22. April 2018
- Champion: West Point Black
- Matches played: 26
- Goals scored: 954 (36.69 per match)
- Best Player: Logan Ormsby; Air Force Academy
- Top goalscorer: Logan Ormsby (48 goals); Air Force Academy
- Best goalkeeper: Michael Monsen; University of Virginia
- All statistics correct as of 2018-04-28.

The 2018 College Nationals was the 23rd Men's College Nationals. The College Nationals was a team handball tournament to determine the College National Champion from 2018 from the US. The University of Virginia played extremely well, wildly outperforming expectations behind strong performances from the outgoing fourth-year class, but ultimately fell short in the final to the machine-like cadets from West Point. UVA has improved vastly over the last three years, and has risen to the elite ranks of collegiate team handball.

== Venues ==
The championship was played at two venues at the United States Military Academy in West Point, New York.

| West Point | 2018 USA Team Handball College Nationals – Men's Division is located in the United States | West Point |
|---|---|---|
| Arvin Gymnasium; 2nd floor | 2018 USA Team Handball College Nationals – Men's Division is located in the United States | Arvin Gymnasium; 4th floor |
| Capacity: ? | 2018 USA Team Handball College Nationals – Men's Division is located in the United States | Capacity: ? |

== Draw ==
Location of 2018 USA Team Handball College Nationals Men's Division Teams
The bigger size of the West Point and OSU Logo shows that they have two teams.

The seeding was based on the USA Men's Top 5 College Rankings from April. This season was the first season such a ranking exist.

The 5th ranked team Illinois State University was not able to play at the college nationals. Because of missing money to travel.

=== Seeding ===
| Pot 1 | Pot 2 | Pot 3 |
|---|---|---|
| West Point Black (1); University of Virginia (2т); Air Force Academy (2т) | Ohio State Grey (4); West Point Gold (NR); University of North Carolina (NR) | Texas A&M University (NV); Pennsylvania State University (NV); Ohio State Scarlet (NV) |

(т=Tie; NR=Not ranked; NV=No votes)

== Modus ==
The nine teams were split in 3 groups A-C. And they play a round robin.

The winner of each group forms a new group D the runner-up's group D and the third group F.

The winner of group D played against the winner of group E the semifinal one and the second of group D played against the third of group D the semifinal two.

The losers of the semis play a small final.

The winners of the semis play the final.

The second and third of group F played an 8/9 classification. The loser becomes ninth. And the winner played against the loser of the 6/7 classification the 7th place game.

The winner of the 6/7 classification (third of group E against first of group F) played against the second of group E the 5th place game.

The games of the group and seeding stages had a game duration of 2×20 minutes and a 5-minute break. The placement and semi-final games had a game duration of 2×25 minutes and a 10-minute break. The small final and the final had a game duration of 2×30 minutes and a 10-minute break.

== Results ==
=== Group stage ===
==== Group A ====
| Team | Pld | W | D | L | GF | GA | GD | Pts |
|---|---|---|---|---|---|---|---|---|
| University of Virginia (2T) | 2 | 2 | 0 | 0 | 43 | 24 | +19 | 4 |
| West Point Gold (NR) | 2 | 1 | 0 | 1 | 49 | 35 | +14 | 2 |
| Ohio State Scarlet (NV) | 2 | 0 | 0 | 2 | 17 | 50 | −33 | 0 |

| 20 April 2018; 17:00 (UTC-4) | University of Virginia | 20 - 5 | Ohio State Scarlet | Arvin Gymnasium 4th floor, United States Military Academy |

| 20 April 2018; 19:00 (UTC-4) | University of Virginia | 23 -19 | West Point Gold | Arvin Gymnasium 4th floor, United States Military Academy |

| 20 April 2018; 20:00 (UTC-4) | West Point Gold | 30 - 12 | Ohio State Scarlet | Arvin Gymnasium 4th floor, United States Military Academy |

==== Group B ====
| Team | Pld | W | D | L | GF | GA | GD | Pts |
|---|---|---|---|---|---|---|---|---|
| Air Force Academy (2T) | 2 | 2 | 0 | 0 | 44 | 28 | +16 | 4 |
| University of North Carolina (NR) | 2 | 1 | 0 | 1 | 27 | 33 | −6 | 2 |
| Texas A&M University (NV) | 2 | 0 | 0 | 2 | 26 | 36 | −10 | 0 |

| 20 April 2018; 16:00 (UTC-4) | Air Force Academy | 23 - 14 | Texas A&M University | Arvin Gymnasium 2nd floor, United States Military Academy |

| 20 April 2018; 18:00 (UTC-4) | Air Force Academy | 21 - 14 | University of North Carolina | Arvin Gymnasium 2nd floor, United States Military Academy |

| 21 April 2018; 8:30 (UTC-4) | University of North Carolina | 13 - 12 | Texas A&M University | Arvin Gymnasium 4th floor, United States Military Academy |

==== Group C ====
| Team | Pld | W | D | L | GF | GA | GD | Pts |
|---|---|---|---|---|---|---|---|---|
| West Point Black (1) | 2 | 2 | 0 | 0 | 43 | 23 | +20 | 4 |
| Ohio State Grey (4) | 2 | 1 | 0 | 1 | 22 | 26 | −4 | 2 |
| Pennsylvania State University (NV) | 2 | 0 | 0 | 2 | 20 | 36 | −16 | 0 |

| 20 April 2018; 16:00 (UTC-4) | West Point Black | 19 - 10 | Ohio State Grey | Arvin Gymnasium 4th floor, United States Military Academy |

| 20 April 2018; 17:00 (UTC-4) | West Point Black | 24 - 13 | Pennsylvania State University | Arvin Gymnasium 2nd floor, United States Military Academy |

| 20 April 2018; 19:00 (UTC-4) | Ohio State Grey | 12 - 7 | Pennsylvania State University | Arvin Gymnasium 2nd floor, United States Military Academy |

=== Seeding stage ===
==== Group D ====
| Team | Pld | W | D | L | GF | GA | GD | Pts |
|---|---|---|---|---|---|---|---|---|
| West Point Black (C1) | 2 | 2 | 0 | 0 | 43 | 31 | +12 | 4 |
| University of Virginia (A1) | 2 | 1 | 0 | 1 | 32 | 38 | −6 | 2 |
| Air Force (B1) | 2 | 0 | 0 | 2 | 38 | 44 | −6 | 0 |

| 21 April 2018; 9:30 (UTC-4) | University of Virginia | 11 - 20 | West Point Black | Arvin Gymnasium 2nd floor, United States Military Academy |

| 21 April 2018; 11:30 (UTC-4) | University of Virginia | 21 - 18 | Air Force | Arvin Gymnasium 2nd floor, United States Military Academy |

| 21 April 2018; 13:30 (UTC-4) | Air Force | 20 - 23 | West Point Black | Arvin Gymnasium 4th floor, United States Military Academy |

==== Group E ====
| Team | Pld | W | D | L | GF | GA | GD | Pts |
|---|---|---|---|---|---|---|---|---|
| West Point Gold (A2) | 2 | 1 | 1 | 0 | 36 | 31 | +5 | 3 |
| North Carolina (B2) | 2 | 1 | 1 | 0 | 36 | 35 | +1 | 3 |
| Ohio State Grey (C2) | 2 | 0 | 0 | 2 | 36 | 42 | −6 | 0 |

| 21 April 2018; 10:30 (UTC-4) | West Point Gold | 21 - 16 | Ohio State Grey | Arvin Gymnasium 4th floor, United States Military Academy |

| 21 April 2018; 12:30 (UTC-4) | West Point Gold | 15 - 15 | North Carolina | Arvin Gymnasium 2nd floor, United States Military Academy |

| 21 April 2018; 14:30 (UTC-4) | North Carolina | 21 - 20 | Ohio State Grey | Arvin Gymnasium 4th floor, United States Military Academy |

==== Group F ====
| Team | Pld | W | D | L | GF | GA | GD | Pts |
|---|---|---|---|---|---|---|---|---|
| Texas A&M (B3) | 2 | 1 | 1 | 0 | 33 | 19 | +14 | 3 |
| Penn State (C3) | 2 | 1 | 1 | 0 | 26 | 24 | +2 | 3 |
| Ohio State Scarlet (A3) | 2 | 0 | 0 | 2 | 17 | 33 | −16 | 0 |

| 21 April 2018; 9:30 (UTC-4) | Ohio State Scarlet | 11 - 13 | Penn State | Arvin Gymnasium 4th floor, United States Military Academy |

| 21 April 2018; 12:30 (UTC-4) | Ohio State Scarlet | 6 - 20 | Texas A&M | Arvin Gymnasium 4th floor, United States Military Academy |

| 21 April 2018; 14:30 (UTC-4) | Texas A&M | 13 - 13 | Penn State | Arvin Gymnasium 2nd floor, United States Military Academy |

=== Championship ===
Semifinals
D1 | West Point Black | 28
E1 | West Point Gold | 21
D2 | University of Virginia | 23
D3 | Air Force | 20

Final
D1 | West Point Black | 26
D2 | University of Virginia | 25
Small Final
E1 | West Point Gold | 39
D3 | Air Force | 24

==== Semifinals ====
| 22 April 2018; 9:15 (UTC-4) | West Point Black | 28 - 21 | West Point Gold | Arvin Gymnasium 2nd floor, United States Military Academy |

| 22 April 2018; 9:15 (UTC-4) | University of Virginia | 23 - 20 | Air Force | Arvin Gymnasium 4th floor, United States Military Academy |

==== Small Final ====
| 22 April 2018; 11:45 (UTC-4) | West Point Gold | 39 - 24 | Air Force | Arvin Gymnasium 2nd floor, United States Military Academy |

==== Final ====
| 22 April 2018; 13:10 (UTC-4) | West Point Black | 26 - 25 | University of Virginia | Arvin Gymnasium 4th floor, United States Military Academy; Attendance: 153 |

=== Placement Games ===
First round
6/7 Classification
E3 | Ohio State Grey | 26
F1 | Texas A&M | 18
8/9 Classification
F2 | Penn State | 19
F3 | Ohio State Scarlet | 14

Second round
Fifth place
E2 | North Carolina | 24
F1 | North Carolina | 23
Seventh place
F1 | North Carolina | 24
F2 | Penn State | 14

==== 8/9 Classification ====
| 22 April 2018; 8:00 (UTC-4) | Penn State | 19 - 14 | Ohio State Scarlet | Arvin Gymnasium 2nd floor, United States Military Academy |

==== 6/7 Classification ====
| 21 April 2018; 16:45 (UTC-4) | Ohio State Grey | 26 - 18 | Texas A&M | Arvin Gymnasium 2nd floor, United States Military Academy |

==== 7th Place ====
| 22 April 2018; 10:30 (UTC-4) | Texas A&M | 24 - 12 | Penn State | Arvin Gymnasium 2nd floor, United States Military Academy |

==== 5th Place ====
| 22 April 2018; 8:00 (UTC-4) | North Carolina | 24 - 23 | Ohio State Grey | Arvin Gymnasium 2nd floor, United States Military Academy |

== Final ranking ==
| Rank | Team |
|---|---|
| 1st place, gold medalist(s) | West Point Black (1) |
| 2nd place, silver medalist(s) | University of Virginia (2т) |
| 3rd place, bronze medalist(s) | West Point Gold (NR) |
| 4 | Air Force Academy (2т) |
| 5 | University of North Carolina (NR) |
| 6 | Ohio State Grey (4) |
| 7 | Texas A&M University (NV) |
| 8 | Pennsylvania State University (NV) |
| 9 | Ohio State Scarlet (NV) |

== Awards ==
| Most Valuable Player: | Logan Ormsby | Air Force Academy |
| Most Valuable Goalkeeper: | Jordan Wenske | Texas A&M University |
| Top Scorer: | Logan Ormsby (48 goals) | Air Force Academy |

== Top scorers ==
| Rank | Name | Goals | Games | Average | Team |
|---|---|---|---|---|---|
| 1st place, gold medalist(s) | player | 28 | 5 | 5.6 | team |
| 2nd place, silver medalist(s) | player | 19 | 6 | 3.17 | team |

== All-Tournament Team ==
=== 1st team ===
| Nicholas Ange | Texas A&M University |
| Timothy Ford | University of Virginia |
| Austin Madryzk | University of Virginia |
| Spencer Klehn | West Point Black |

=== 2nd team ===
| Ty Turner | Pennsylvania State University |
| Christopher Magan | Pennsylvania State University |
| Yasin Al-Fahham | Pennsylvania State University |
| Max Purzak | Pennsylvania State University |
| Gregory Guidry | Texas A&M University |
| Truman Brody-Boyd | University of Virginia |
| Steven Hume | University of Virginia |
| Christian Vila | University of Virginia |
| Eugene Thagard | West Point Gold |
| William Ratliff | West Point Black |
| William Beiswenger | West Point Black |
