= 2018 USA Team Handball College Nationals – Women's Division =

2018 College Nationals - Women's Division
- Season: 2017–18
- Dates: 20 - 22. April 2018
- Champion: Pennsylvania State University
- Matches played: 10
- Goals scored: 254 (25.4 per match)
- Best Player: Ansley Davenport; West Point Gold
- Top goalscorer: Ansley Davenport; West Point Gold
- Best goalkeeper: Fredrikke Johansen; Pennsylvania State University
- All statistics correct as of 2018-04-25.

The 2018 College Nationals was the 23rd Women's College Nationals. The College Nationals was a team handball tournament to determine the College National Champion from 2018 from the US.

The Pennsylvania State University won their first title in their first season of handball competition. They formed their team with help from the runner-up from West Point only one year ago in April.

== Venues ==
The championship was played at two venues at the United States Military Academy in West Point, New York.

West Point	2018 USA Team Handball College Nationals – Women's Division is located in the United States	West Point
Arvin Gymnasium; 2nd floor	2018 USA Team Handball College Nationals – Women's Division is located in the United States	Arvin Gymnasium; 4th floor
Capacity: ?	2018 USA Team Handball College Nationals – Women's Division is located in the United States	Capacity: ?

== Modus ==
Location of 2018 USA Team Handball College Nationals Women's Division Teams
The bigger size of the West Point Logo show that they have two teams.

The four teams played first a round robin. Game duration 2x20min + 5min break.

The first plays against the 4th and 2nd against the 3rd of the Group stage the semis. Game duration 2x25min + 10min break.

The losers of the semis play a small final. Game duration 2x25min + 10min break.

The winners of the semis play the final. Game duration 2x30min + 10min break.

== Results ==
=== Group stage ===
Team	Pld	W	D	L	GF	GA	GD	Pts
West Point Black	3	2	1	0	56	33	+23	5
Pennsylvania State University	3	2	1	0	34	30	+4	5
University of North Carolina	3	1	0	2	28	36	−8	2
West Point Gold	3	0	0	3	36	55	−19	0

20 April 2018; 18:00 (UTC-4)	Pennsylvania State University	14 - 12	West Point Gold	Arvin Gymnasium 4th floor, United States Military Academy

20 April 2018; 20:00 (UTC-4)	West Point Black	18 - 7	University of North Carolina	Arvin Gymnasium 2nd floor, United States Military Academy

21 April 2018; 8:30 (UTC-4)	Pennsylvania State University	7 - 5	University of North Carolina	Arvin Gymnasium 2nd floor, United States Military Academy

21 April 2018; 10:30 (UTC-4)	University of North Carolina	16 - 11	West Point Gold	Arvin Gymnasium 2nd floor, United States Military Academy

21 April 2018; 11:30 (UTC-4)	West Point Black	13 - 13	Pennsylvania State University	Arvin Gymnasium 4th floor, United States Military Academy

21 April 2018; 13:30 (UTC-4)	West Point Gold	13 - 25	West Point Black	Arvin Gymnasium 2nd floor, United States Military Academy

=== Championship ===
Semifinals
GS1	West Point Black	16
GS4	West Point Gold	12
GS2	Penn State	12
GS3	North Carolina	6

Final
GS1	West Point Black	9
GS	Penn State	10
Small Final
GS4	West Point Gold	17
GS3	North Carolina	18

==== Semifinals ====
21 April 2018; 15:30 (UTC-4)	Penn State	12 - 6	North Carolina	Arvin Gymnasium 4th floor, United States Military Academy
21 April 2018; 15:30 (UTC-4)	Araujo 6	(4 - 3)	Biller 4	Arvin Gymnasium 4th floor, United States Military Academy

21 April 2018; 16:45 (UTC-4)	West Point Black	16 - 12	West Point Gold	Arvin Gymnasium 4th floor, United States Military Academy
21 April 2018; 16:45 (UTC-4)	Ducan & Morris 4	(5 - 4)	Davenport 7	Arvin Gymnasium 4th floor, United States Military Academy

==== Small Final ====
22 April 2018; 10:30 (UTC-4)	North Carolina	18 - 17	West Point Gold	Arvin Gymnasium 4th floor, United States Military Academy

==== Final ====
22 April 2018; 11:45 (UTC-4)	Penn State	10 - 9	West Point Black	Arvin Gymnasium 4th floor, United States Military Academy

== Final ranking ==
Rank	Team
1st place, gold medalist(s)	Pennsylvania State University
2nd place, silver medalist(s)	West Point Black
3rd place, bronze medalist(s)	University of North Carolina
4	West Point Gold

== Awards ==
Most Valuable Player:	Ansley Davenport	West Point Gold
Most Valuable Goalkeeper:	Fredrikke Johansen	Pennsylvania State University
Top Scorer:	Ansley Davenport	West Point Gold

== All Americans ==
=== 1st team ===
Maddy Hindermyer	Pennsylvania State University
Rachel McGrath	University of North Carolina
Natalie Nepa	West Point Black

=== 2nd team ===
Maria Carolina Araujo	Pennsylvania State University
Mary Lauren Micou	Pennsylvania State University
Leah Suydam	Pennsylvania State University
Maddie Keane	Pennsylvania State University
Paulina Powierza	University of North Carolina
Ellie Cahill	University of North Carolina
Devon Biller	University of North Carolina
Olivia Beattie	West Point Black
Christina Bouvier	West Point Black
Alanna Severt	West Point Gold
