= 2017–18 USA Team Handball rankings =

- Season: 2017–18

Preseason #1
- Men's: New York City (2005-06)
- Women's: inaugural ranking
- College: inaugural ranking

End of season champions
- Men's: New York Athletic Club
- Women's: Rogue
- College: West Point Black

Leagues with most teams in final poll
- Men's: NTHL Division I (8)
- Women's: NTHL Women's Division (3)
- College: NTHL Division I (3)

After there already existed a 2005-06 ranking for the Men's. This was the first season a team handball ranking for the clubs and the men's college was created.

== Legend ==
	Increase in ranking
	Decrease in ranking
	New to rankings from previous week
Italics	Number of first place votes
(#–#-#)	Win-tie-loss record
т	Tied with team above or below also with this symbol
(V)	Varsity teams
NR	Not ranked but receiving votes

== Men's Top 25 ==
	Month 1 Dec 13	Month 2 Jan	Month 3 Feb	Month 4 Mar	Month 5 Apr	Month 6 May 17	
1.	New York Athletic Club (5-0-0)	New York Athletic Club	New York Athletic Club (4)	New York Athletic Club (5)	New York Athletic Club (5)	New York Athletic Club (5)	1.
2.	New York City (6-0-0)	New York City	New York City (3)	New York City (3)	New York City (2)	New York City (1)	2.
3.	Chicago Inter (16-1-1)	Chicago Inter	Chicago Inter	Chicago Inter	Chicago Inter	Chicago Inter	3.
4.	Revol (3-0-2)	Revol	Revol	Revol	San Francisco CalHeat	Houston Firehawks	4.
5.	San Francisco CalHeat (6-0-4)	San Francisco CalHeat	Houston Firehawks	Houston Firehawks	Houston Firehawks т	San Francisco CalHeat	5.
6.	DC Diplomats (1-0-2)	Houston Firehawks	San Francisco CalHeat	San Francisco CalHeat	DC Diplomats т	DC Diplomats	6.
7.	West Point Black (V) (5-0-6)	West Point Black (V)	West Point Black (V)	Georgia HC	Revol	West Point Black (V)	7.
8.	New York City 2 (2-0-2)	Georgia HC	Georgia HC	Boston	Boston	Georgia HC	8.
9.	Georgia HC (4-1-1)	Carolina Blue	Carolina Blue	DC Diplomats	Georgia HC	Boston	9.
10.	University of Virginia (V) (4-1-4)	Boston	Boston	Carolina Blue	West Point Black (V)	Mayor Tijuana BC	10.
11.	Carolina Blue	Alberta Jrs.	DC Diplomats	West Point Black (V)	Los Angeles THC	Revol	11.
12.	Ohio State Gray (V)	Ontario	Blue Heat	Ontario	Ontario	Carolina Blue	12.
13.	Boston	DC Diplomats	Alberta Jrs.	University of Virginia (V)	Alberta Jrs.	Alberta Jrs.	13.
14.	Houston Firehawks	Knight Air	Minnesota	Knight Air	Columbus Armada-Nina	University of Virginia (V)	14.
15.	Auburn University (V)	Minnesota	Ohio State Gray (V)	Alberta Jrs.	Seattle	Ontario	15.
16.	Barrington THC	University of Virginia (V)	University of Virginia (V)	Auburn University (V)	DC Ambassadors	Seattle	16.
17.	Uni. of North Carolina (V)	Ohio State Gray (V)	Ontario	Penn State (V)	University of Virginia (V)	Knight Air	17.
18.	Blue Heat	Barrington THC	Knight Air	Miami University (V)	Ohio State Gray (V)	Barrington THC	18.
19.	Air Force (V)	Blue Heat	Miami University (V)	Air Force (V)	Barrington THC	Los Angeles	19.
20.	West Point Gold (V)	Air Force (V)	Barrington THC	Minnesota	Air Force (V)	Columbus Armada-Nina	20.
21.	Knight Air	New York City 2	Auburn University (V)	New York City 2	Knight Air	Air Force (V)	21.
22.	Los Angeles THC	Auburn University (V)	Air Force (V)	Columbus Armada	Portland Sasquatch	Portland Sasquatch	22.
23.	Columbus Armada	Los Angeles THC	Columbus Armada	Ohio State Gray (V)	New York City 2	Illinois State (V)	23.
24.	Illinois State (V)	Miami University (V)	New York City 2	Barrington THC	Penn State (V) т	West Point Gold (V)	24.
25.	Minnesota	Columbus Armada	Illinois State (V)	Illinois State (V) т	Carolina Blue т	New York City 3	25.
25.	Minnesota	Columbus Armada	Illinois State (V)	DC Ambassadors т	Carolina Blue т	New York City 3	25.
	Month 1 Dec 13	Month 2 Jan	Month 3 Feb	Month 4 Mar	Month 5 Apr	Month 6 May 17	
NR	Miami University (V)	Illinois State (V)	Los Angeles THC	Los Angeles THC	Illinois State (V)	Blue Heat	NR
NR	Ontario	Dallas Team Handball	Dallas Team Handball	Dallas Team Handball	Dallas Team Handball	Ohio State Gray (V)	NR
NR	Pittsburgh University (V)	Pittsburgh University (V)	Pittsburgh University (V)	Pittsburgh University (V)	Auburn University (V)	Auburn University (V)	NR
NR	University of Cincinnati (V)	University of Cincinnati	University of Cincinnati	Boston 2	Boston 2	Boston 2	NR
NR	Alberta Jrs.	West Point Gold (V)	West Point Gold (V)	West Point Gold (V)	West Point Gold (V)	New York City 2	NR
NR	Milwaukee United	United HC	Milwaukee United		Minnesota	Minnesota	NR
NR	New York City 3	New York City 3	UNC Tar Heels (V)	New York City 3	New York City 3		NR
NR		Texas A&M University (V)	Texas A&M University (V)	Texas A&M University (V)	Texas A&M University (V)		NR
NR		Seattle HC		Long Island Tigers	San Francisco CalHeat II		NR
NR		Uni. of North Carolina (V)	Uni. of North Carolina (V)	Uni. of North Carolina (V)	Uni. of North Carolina (V)		NR
NR		Portland Sasquatch		Blue Heat	Johns Hopkins University (V)		NR
NR					UNILIDER Sonora		NR
NR					Miami University (V)		NR
	Month 1 Dec 13	Month 2 Jan	Month 3 Feb	Month 4 Mar	Month 5 Apr	Month 6 May 17	
		Dropped: Milwaukee United	Dropped: United HC; New York City 3; Seattle HC; Portland Sasquatch	Dropped: UNC Tar Heels (V); University of Cincinnati; Milwaukee United	Dropped: Blue Heat; Long Island Tigers; Pittsburgh University (V)	Dropped: Dallas Team Handball; DC Ambassadors; Johns Hopkins University (V); Miami University (V); Penn State (V); San Francisco CalHeat II; Texas A&M University (V); UNILIDER Sonora; Uni. of North Carolina (V)	

== Women's Top 5 ==
	Month 1 Jan	Month 2 Feb	Month 3 Mar	Month 4 Apr	Month 5 May 17	
1.	Rogue (5-0-0)	Rogue (5-0-0) (6)	Rogue (5-0-0) (5)	Rogue (5-0-0) (5)	Rogue (5-0-0) (4)	1.
2.	Boston (5-0-0)	Houston Firehawks (4-0-0)	New York City (7-0-0) (3)	New York City (9-0-1) (1)	New York City (9-0-1) (2)	2.
3.	New York City (2-0-0)	Boston (5-0-0) (1)	Houston Firehawks (4-0-0)	Houston Firehawks (4-0-0)	Houston Firehawks (4-0-0) т	3.
4.	Chicago Inter (3-0-2)	Chicago Inter (6-0-3)	Boston (8-0-2)	Boston (8-0-2)	Boston (8-0-2) т	4.
5.	DC Diplomats (4-0-1)	New York City (2-0-0)	Chicago Inter (6-0-3)	DC Diplomats (7-0-3)	DC Diplomats (7-0-3)	5.
	Month 1 Jan	Month 2 Feb	Month 3 Mar	Month 4 Apr	Month 5 May 17	
NR	San Francisco CalHeat (2-0-3)	DC Diplomats (4-0-1)	DC Diplomats (5-0-3)	Chicago Inter (6-0-3)	Chicago Inter (6-0-3)	NR
	Month 1 Jan	Month 2 Feb	Month 3 Mar	Month 4 Apr	Month 5 May 17	
		Dropped: San Francisco CalHeat (4-0-5)	None	None	None	

== Collegiate Top 5 ==
The record at the college ranking is only against other college teams.

	Month 1 Jan 14	Month 2 Mar 17	Month 3 Apr 16	Month 4 May 17	
1.	West Point Black (2–0-0) (9)	West Point Black (2–0-0) (8)	West Point Black (2–0-0) (7)	West Point Black (8-0-0) (5)	1.
2.	Air Force (0–0-1)	Virginia (4-0-1) (1)	Virginia (4-0-2) т	Virginia (8-0-4)	2.
3.	Virginia (3-0–1)	Air Force (0–0-1)	Air Force (0–0-1) т	West Point Gold (7-0-3)	3.
4.	Illinois (4-0–0)	Illinois (7-0-1)	Ohio State Gray (9-0-4)	Air Force (2-0-5)	4.
5.	Ohio State Gray (5-0-4)	North Carolina (4-0-2) т	Illinois (7-0-1)	North Carolina (7-0-4)	5.
5.	Ohio State Gray (5-0-4)	West Point Gold (2-0-1) т	Illinois (7-0-1)	North Carolina (7-0-4)	5.
	Month 1 Jan 14	Month 2 Mar 17	Month 3 Apr 16	Month 4 May 17	
NR	North Carolina (3-0-0)	Ohio State Gray (5-0-4)	West Point Gold (2-0-1)	Ohio State Gray (11-0-8)	NR
NR	Aubrun (1-0-1)	Ohio State Gray (5-0-4)	West Point Gold (2-0-1)	Ohio State Gray (11-0-8)	NR
NR	West Point Gold (0-0-1)	Ohio State Gray (5-0-4)	West Point Gold (2-0-1)	Ohio State Gray (11-0-8)	NR
NR	Pittsburgh (2-0-2)	Texas A&M (0-0-0)	North Carolina (4-0-2)	Ohio State Gray (11-0-8)	NR
NR	Texas A&M (0-0-0)	Texas A&M (0-0-0)	North Carolina (4-0-2)	Ohio State Gray (11-0-8)	NR
	Month 1 Jan 14	Month 2 Mar 17	Month 3 Apr 16	Month 4 May 17	
		Dropped: Aubrun (1-0-1); Pittsburgh (2-0-4)	Dropped: Texas A&M (0-0-0)	Dropped: Illinois (7-0-1)	
