= NCAA Emerging Sports for Women =

Sports for women

- Logo of the NCAA Emerging Sports for Women
- Founded: 1994
- Sports fielded: 4
- Country: United States
- Headquarters: Indianapolis, Indiana
- Website: www.ncaa.org

NCAA Emerging Sports for Women are intercollegiate sports for women that are recognized by the National Collegiate Athletic Association (NCAA) in the United States, but do not have sanctioned NCAA Championships.

== History ==
In 1994, the NCAA adopted the Gender Equity Task Force's recommendation to create a list of emerging sports for women so as to support athletic opportunities for collegiate women. Managed by the Committee on Women's Athletics, the Emerging Sports list started with nine sports, several of which have since attained NCAA Championship status; while other sports have been added or dropped from the list.

== Process ==
To be considered for Emerging Sport status, the sport must meet the following requirements:

- The sport meets the NCAA definition of a sport
- At least 20 varsity or competitive club teams exist at NCAA member schools
- At least 10 NCAA member schools sponsor or intend to sponsor the sport

The Committee on Access, Opportunity and Impact (formerly the Committee on Women's Athletics) can recommend an emerging sport to become an NCAA Championship sport once 40 NCAA member schools sponsor it. Once added to the Emerging Sports list, a sport has 10 years to achieve NCAA Championship status, after which it may be removed from the list.

== Overview of sports added and dropped ==
Sports that have graduated from the Emerging Sports program and have currently operating NCAA championships are in green. Sports that have graduated but have not yet started official NCAA championship competition are in purple. Sports that have been removed from the program are in red.

Number of Schools Sponsoring (Page:196-197)
Sport	1998–99	2022–23	Change	Percent
Rowing	122	146	+24	+20%
Ice hockey	40	113	+73	+150%
Bowling	5	99	+94	+1880%
Beach Volleyball	—	91	+91	——
Water polo	37	66	+29	+78%
Equestrian	41	48	+7	+17%
Triathlon	—	34	+34	——
Squash	27	31	+4	+15%
Rugby	—	29	+29	——
Synchronized Swimming	7	3	-4	-57%
Stunt	—	2	+2	——
Badminton	10	0	-10	-100%
Archery	6	0	-6	-100%
Team Handball	0	0	0	0%

Number of Athletes (Page:215-218)
Sport	1998–99	2022–23	Change	Percent
Rowing	5629	6707	+1078	+19%
Ice hockey	901	2888	+1987	+220%
Beach Volleyball	—	1615	+1615	——
Equestrian	632	1443	+811	+128%
Water polo	746	1337	+413	+79%
Bowling	20	889	+869	+4345%
Rugby	—	845	+845	——
Squash	365	403	+38	+10%
Triathlon	—	249	+249	——
Synchronized Swimming	108	37	-71	-66%
Stunt	—	77	+77	——
Badminton	94	0	-94	-100%
Archery	106	0	-106	-100%
Team Handball	0	0	0	0%

NCAA Sports Sponsorship and Participation Rates Database

== Sports ==
=== Current emerging sports ===
==== Equestrian ====
Logo of ESW Equestrian

As of the 2016–17 school year, 18 Division I (D-I), five Division II (D-II), and 21 Division III (D-III) schools participated in varsity competition. In 2017–18, 16 D-I, five D-II and one D-III schools participated in the NCEA. The total number of NCEA participants rose to 24 for 2018–19.

However, as of the 2023–24 school year, equestrianism is considered an Emerging Sport only in Divisions I and II; competition among Division III schools has remained independent of the NCAA. A total of 16 D-III members sponsored varsity equestrian teams in 2019–20. With that in mind, a group of 21 D-III members submitted a proposal to bring equestrianism in that division under the Emerging Sports umbrella; this proposal was approved by the NCAA Committee on Women's Athletics in September 2019. From there, the proposal was reviewed by three other NCAA committees before a final vote by the entire Division III membership during the 2020 NCAA Convention in January of that year. If the proposal had passed, the number of NCAA equestrian programs would have increased to 40—the number required for an Emerging Sport to enter the process for consideration as an official NCAA championship. However, the Division III membership defeated the proposal to bring D-III equestrian under the NCAA umbrella; the vote was 195–174 against inclusion, with over 100 abstentions. Division III voted down a second attempt to bring equestrian under the NCAA umbrella in 2022.

The University of Georgia has won 8 titles, the most of the NCEA as of 2025.

In 2016 it was nearly removed from the list, but at the NCAA Convention, the college administrators voted for it to continue.

==== Flag football ====
Logo of ESW Flag football

On February 12, 2025, the NCAA Committee on Women's Athletics recommended that all three divisions add flag football to the Emerging Sports program. All three divisions were expected to vote on the proposal no later than the January 2026 NCAA convention; if approved, official inclusion was intended to take place in 2026–27. When the committee made its recommendation, at least 65 NCAA members sponsored flag football at either the club or varsity level, with others slated to add the sport in the 2025–26 school year. The Division III Atlantic East Conference became the first NCAA conference to officially sponsor the sport in the spring 2025 season, and the Division II Conference Carolinas held its first flag football season in spring 2026. The first Division I conference to announce the addition of flag football was the Big South Conference, which will start sponsoring the sport in 2027–28. However, the first D-I conference to officially sponsor the sport is the Mid-Eastern Athletic Conference, which announced in June 2026 that it would hold its first conference championship in spring 2027.

At the January 2026 NCAA convention, all three divisions approved the addition of flag football to the Emerging Sports program, effective immediately. Schools sponsoring the sport in 2025–26 will count toward the threshold of 40 programs needed for eventual official championship status. That May, with more than 100 NCAA members planning to field teams in the spring 2027 season, the NCAA Committee on Access, Opportunity and Impact recommended that all three divisions sponsor legislation to add a National Collegiate championship. Should said legislation pass at the January 2027 NCAA convention, the first official championship could take place as early as spring 2028.

==== Rugby ====
Logo of ESW Rugby

Penn State University is the women's college team with the most titles (with 16 titles overall including 14 during the period when NCAA Emerging Sports for Women program has been in effect).

As of the 2016–17 school year, there were seven D-I, three D-II, and four D-III schools participating in varsity competition. Three schools added the sport in 2018–19, and two more did so in 2019–20. Additionally, the National Intercollegiate Rugby Association, which currently administers the college championship, began actively working with more than 20 additional schools during the 2018–19 school year, with the goal of either establishing new women's rugby programs or elevating existing club teams to NCAA status.

==== Triathlon ====
Logo of ESW Triathlon

Before the 2020 addition of acrobatics & tumbling and wrestling to the program, triathlon had been the newest emerging sport, having received that status in January 2014.

As of the 2017–18 school year, four D-I, eight D-II, and seven D-III schools participated in varsity competition. Nine NCAA schools added the sport in 2018–19, with Hampton becoming the first historically black school to sponsor the sport. By 2025–26, sponsorship had increased to 41 schools (17 D-I, 12 each in D-II and D-III).

Conference Carolinas will become the first NCAA conference to officially sponsor the sport, with three full members and four affiliates starting conference competition in 2026–27.

=== Added NCAA sports ===
Former emerging sports that have since achieved NCAA Championship status:

==== Rowing ====
Rowing was the first former emerging sport to become NCAA-sanctioned, in 1997. It was the sport that achieved NCAA status the fastest, obtaining full recognition in two years.

Before rowing became an emerging sport, the University of Washington won nine national titles during the sport's emerging status. Only Princeton University and Brown University won a title after rowing became an NCAA sport. Brown has the most D-I titles, with seven.

As of the 2016–17 school year, there were 89 D-I, 16 D-II, and 41 D-III schools participating in varsity competition. By 2025–26, sponsorship levels were 94 D-I, 14 D-II, and 40 D-III. During the 2026 NCAA convention in January, D-II members voted to exempt women's rowing from division rules that require a minimum number of sponsoring schools (currently 35) to maintain a separate championship. Had this exemption not been approved, the D-II championship would have been discontinued after the 2026–27 school year, with no NCAA championship available for D-II rowing schools.

==== Ice hockey ====
In 2001, women's ice hockey became an official NCAA sport.

The University of Wisconsin–Madison has the most National Collegiate (Note: "National Collegiate" is the NCAA's standard term for championship events open to members of more than one division. The ice hockey championship at this level is open to members of Divisions I and II.) championships, with nine. The Wisconsin program has produced many Olympians for the United States, Canada, and other countries.

As of the most recent 2025–26 season, 123 schools participate in varsity women's ice hockey—45 in the National Collegiate division (40 D-I, five D-II) and 78 in D-III.

==== Water polo ====
In 2001, women's water polo become an NCAA sport.

UC San Diego was the best team. Before Water Polo became an emerging sport, they had won five titles. During and after the emerging period, UCLA became the dominant university, with 4 Emerging and 7 NCAA titles.

As of the 2016–17 school year, there are 34 D-I, 10 D-II, and 17 D-III schools participating in varsity competition. By 2025–26, sponsorship had slightly increased to 37 D-I, 9 D-II, and 18 D-III.

==== Bowling ====
In 2004, bowling become an official NCAA sport.

The University of Nebraska–Lincoln has the most NCAA titles among bowling programs. The Cornhuskers have won five NCAA championships and qualified for all 22 tournaments to date.

As of the 2019–20 school year, 34 D-I, 34 D-II, and 19 D-III schools participated in varsity competition. By 2025–26, participation had modestly increased to 39 in D-I, 36 in D-II, and 20 D-III. Division II will have its own bowling championship starting in 2027–28.

==== Beach volleyball ====
Before women's wrestling became an official NCAA sport in January 2025, beach volleyball was the most recent emerging sport to become an NCAA sport, doing so in 2016. It only took three years to reach this status.

The first eight championships were won by universities located in Los Angeles—six by USC and two by UCLA. The first championship by a school outside that city was TCU's 2025 title.

In the 2022–23 school year, 67 D-I and 17 D-II schools participated in varsity competition. By 2025–26, sponsorship had increased to 68 D-I and 23 D-II.

==== Wrestling ====
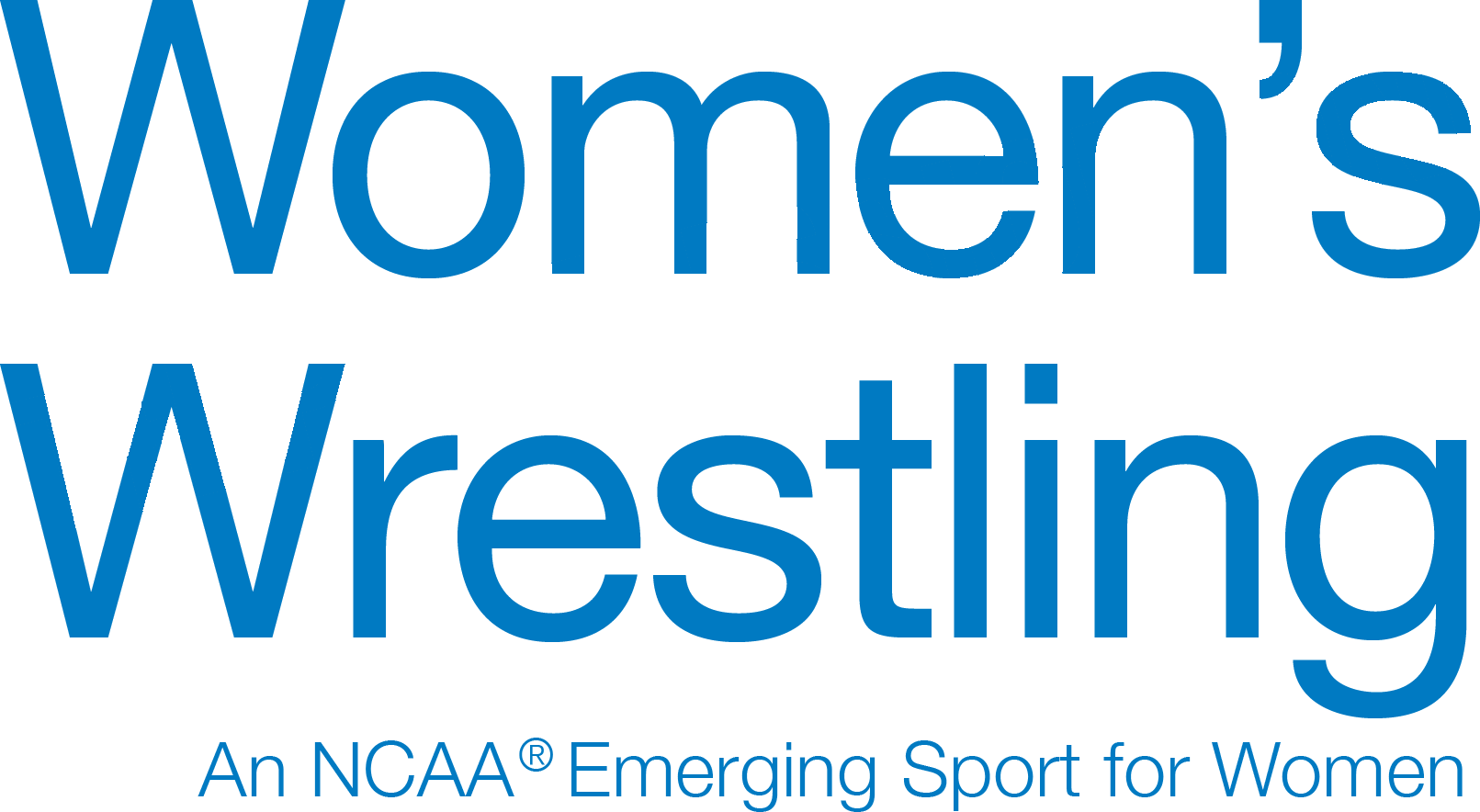
Logo during ESW Wrestling

Wrestling was added to the Emerging Sports program alongside acrobatics & tumbling in 2020–21. At the time of the 2019 announcement, the Wrestle Like a Girl organization, along with the sport's national governing body of USA Wrestling, noted that 23 NCAA member institutions sponsored varsity women's wrestling. The number of NCAA women's wrestling schools expanded further to 35 by the time that sport was formally added to the program.

By the 2023–24 academic year, more than 70 NCAA members sponsored varsity women's wrestling, and the NCAA Committee on Women's Athletics recommended on February 7, 2024, that all three divisions sponsor legislation to establish an official NCAA championship. Following approval by all three divisions at the 2025 NCAA annual convention, the first official championship, which uses the National Collegiate format, was held in winter 2026. Wrestling was officially removed from the Emerging Sports program once its championship status was confirmed.

As of the first season of official championship competition in 2025–26, 111 NCAA members sponsor varsity teams. The majority are in Division III, with 66. Of the remaining programs, 39 are D-II and only six are D-I. With that as a backdrop, Division III proposed its own championship in that sport, which was approved at the January 2026 NCAA convention. The first D-III championship will take place in spring 2028.

NCAA-recognized women's wrestling does not use the collegiate ruleset of the NCAA men's sport, instead using the international freestyle ruleset. A separate national governing body overseeing college wrestling, the National Collegiate Wrestling Association, uses collegiate rules in both its men's and women's divisions.

==== Acrobatics & tumbling ====
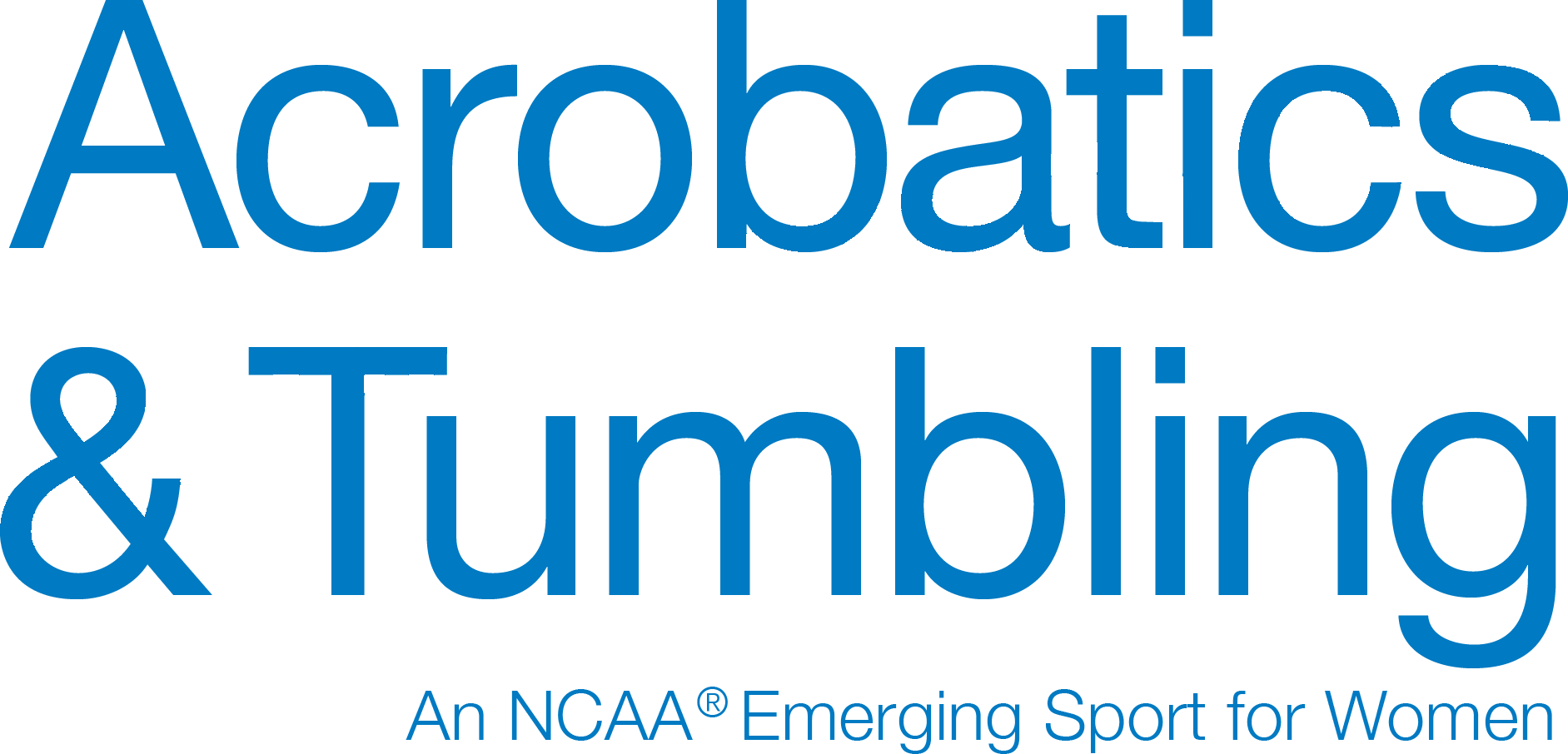
Logo during ESW Acrobatics & Tumbling

This sport, which combines the internationally recognized gymnastics disciplines of acrobatic gymnastics and tumbling, was a relatively new Emerging Sport, having been officially added in 2020–21. (The sport currently recognized as "gymnastics" by the NCAA is internationally known as artistic gymnastics.) On June 3, 2019, the NCAA announced that its Committee on Women's Athletics had recommended the addition of acrobatics & tumbling and wrestling to the Emerging Sports program, effective with the 2020–21 school year. Both sports were formally added to the program on the aforementioned schedule after approval by the membership of all three NCAA divisions, with the final approval coming from Division I on June 17, 2020.

At the time of the formal addition of acrobatics & tumbling to the Emerging Sports program, the National Collegiate Acrobatics and Tumbling Association, which has governed this discipline at college level, indicated that 30 NCAA schools would sponsor the sport in 2020–21. Also at that time, two Division II conferences officially sponsored the sport. The Mountain East Conference began sponsoring the sport in 2018–19, and Conference Carolinas added it for 2020–21.

On May 15, 2025, the NCAA Committee on Women's Athletics recommended that all three divisions sponsor legislation to create a single National Collegiate championship (i.e., open to members of all divisions) in acrobatics & tumbling. By that time, 54 NCAA members had either sponsored, or announced their intentions to sponsor, that sport. All divisions then needed to sponsor legislation for a vote by each division, which would take place no sooner than the 2026 NCAA Convention. Following approval, an NCAA committee would then be established to prepare for an inaugural championship to take place in spring 2027.

The first division to introduce such a proposal was Division I on June 25, 2025, with Divisions II and III soon following suit. All three divisions approved the new championship during the January 2026 NCAA convention, with the first edition being held in spring 2027.

==== Stunt ====
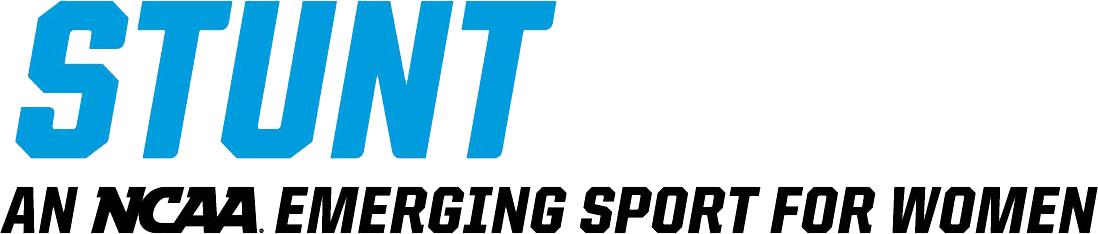
Logo during ESW Stunt

Stunt (often stylized as STUNT) is an all-female cheerleading discipline that emphasizes acrobatics. At the 2023 NCAA convention, Division II approved the addition of stunt to the Emerging Sports program. Divisions I and III did not immediately approve this move for their own purposes, but referred the proposal to the Committee on Women's Athletics. On February 14, 2023, the committee voted unanimously to recommend the addition of stunt as an emerging sport in the other two divisions. Both divisions were to review this recommendation at later meetings. The Division I Council formally approved the addition of stunt to the Emerging Sports program in April 2023. Stunt became part of the Emerging Sports program for Divisions I and II in August 2023, and it became part of the Emerging Sports program for Division III in 2024. Before the first NCAA championship event in 2026–27, championships were governed by USA Cheer.

The first NCAA conference to sponsor stunt was the Great Midwest Athletic Conference, a Division II league that added the sport for the 2022–23 school year. Initially, four full members and one affiliate competed; for 2023–24, two more full members added the sport and one other affiliate joined.

On the same day that the Committee on Women's Athletics recommended the addition of acrobatics & tumbling as an official championship sport, it recommended the same for stunt. At that time, more than 40 NCAA members sponsored the sport, with at least 15 of them having added the sport in the 2024–25 school year. The procedure for elevating stunt to official championship status is identical to that for acrobatics & tumbling. The first official stunt championship, which would also use the National Collegiate format, would be held no earlier than spring 2027. Division I was the first to propose formal legislation to establish the new championship, doing so on June 25, 2025 (the same date it proposed the same for acrobatics & tumbling), with the other divisions soon doing so as well. All three divisions approved the new championship at the January 2026 NCAA convention, with the first championship taking place in spring 2027.

=== Dropped sports ===
Former emerging sports that have since been removed include:

==== Archery ====
The Arizona State University was the major program before the emerging years. They won 22 titles. During the program, Texas A&M University won 25 titles and since then three.

In the 1998–99 season they had six varsity programs; after that it was dropped until the 2008–09 season. After that season, no school sponsored the sport anymore.

==== Badminton ====
Before it was an emerging sport, Arizona State University was the best university with 17 titles. The UC San Diego has four sourced titles between 1995 and 2015.

Badminton had the same decline as Archery, from 10 teams in 1998–99 to two teams in 2008–09. Afterwards, there were no collegiate teams.

==== Squash ====
Princeton University won 12 titles before 1994. Harvard University won eight titles between 1995 and 2015. These two schools also have the most overall titles, with 17 for Princeton and 16 for Harvard.

Between 1981 and 1995 around 20 schools sponsored the sport. After that it increased to around 30 and held at this level until now.

==== Synchronized swimming ====
Ohio State University has been the most successful collegiate team at synchronized swimming with, 15 before, 13 during, and two titles after the emerging sport period.

Between 1995 and 2009, they were always around eight participating teams. In the 2009–10 season, no university sponsored the sport. Since then it has grown to three teams in the 2016–17 season.

==== Team handball ====
Team handball was one of the first nine emerging sports. Between 1997 and 2006, the NCAA sanctioned the Southeast Team Handball Conference.

The current championship for team handball is the College Nationals. Army has won 19 titles, making them the record champion. They won 13 titles during the emerging sport period.

Three universities won the adult National Championships. These are Kansas State University at the first edition in 1975, Ohio State University in 1978, and the University of Minnesota in 1990.

No university ever sponsored Team handball.

Since 2007 until 2017, only the Army and UNC clubs existed. Then the Penn State University women's team was created with help from the Army team. They were able to win at their first appearance at the College Nationals 2018 title.

== Scholarship limits by sport ==
All sports that the NCAA has classified as emerging sports, whether past or present, have been treated as "equivalency" sports for financial aid purposes. In equivalency sports, each team is restricted to offering athletically related financial aid equivalent to a set number of full scholarships, with that number typically fixed at a level considerably smaller than the standard squad size. The vast majority of athletic aid awards in such sports are partial scholarships. This contrasts with "head-count" sports, a concept that existed only in Division I before the 2024 settlement of the House v. NCAA legal case, in which the NCAA limits the number of individuals that can receive athletic aid, but allows each to receive up to a full scholarship. Before the House settlement took full effect in July 2025, four women's sports were head-count—basketball, gymnastics, tennis, and (indoor) volleyball.

These scholarship limits are now largely restricted to Division II following the House settlement.

Sport	DI	DII
Current
Acrobatics & tumbling	14	9
Equestrian	15	15
Rugby	12	12
Stunt	9	9
Triathlon	6.5	5
Wrestling	10	10
NCAA
Beach Volleyball (Note: Colleges which don't sponsor indoor volleyball are allowed to give 8 scholarships.)	6	5
Bowling	5	5
Ice Hockey	18	18
Rowing	20	20
Water Polo	8	8
Dropped
Archery	5	9
Badminton	6	10
Squash	12	9
Synchronized Swimming	5	5
Team Handball	10	12

== Roster limits by sport (Division I only) ==
Following the House v. NCAA settlement, scholarship limits were replaced by roster limits in all Division I sports. These limits, which took effect in 2025–26, apply to members of conferences that were defendants in House (the "Power Four" conferences and the Pac-12 Conference, which had "power" status before its 2024 collapse), plus programs that opted into the House framework.

Student-athletes who had been on NCAA teams before 2025–26 and had athletic eligibility remaining were granted a blanket exemption from roster limits. The NCAA created a database of such individuals, and anyone listed in that database could be on a roster throughout the remainder of their athletic eligibility without counting against roster limits.

The table below is restricted to sports currently in the Emerging Sports program. The NCAA will not enforce roster limits in flag football until 2027–28.

Sport	Roster limit
Equestrian	50
Flag football	25
Rugby	36
Triathlon	14

== Publications ==
McCollum, Emilee R. (May 2017). The Impact of the NCAA Emerging Sports Program for Women on Title IX Compliance: A 10-Year Longitudinal Study (PDF) (Masters thesis). Chapel Hill, North Carolina: University of North Carolina at Chapel Hill. doi:10.17615/80d1-9z20. Archived from the original on 10 November 2019.
