= 2005–06 USA Team Handball rankings =

- Season: 2005–06

Preseason #1
- Men's: inaugural ranking

End of season champions
- Men's: New York City

Leagues with most teams in final poll
- Men's: Southeast Team Handball Conference (2)

This was the first season a team handball ranking for the men's clubs was created.

== Legend ==
	Increase in ranking
	Decrease in ranking
	New to rankings from previous week
Italics	Number of first place votes
(#–#-#)	Win-tie-loss record
т	Tied with team above or below also with this symbol
(V)	Varsity teams
NR	Not ranked but receiving votes

== USA Top 5 ==
	Week 1 Jan 28	Week 2 Feb 14	Week 3 Mar 2	Week 4 Mar 16	
1.	Atlanta Metro Condors (11–0-1) (3)	Atlanta Team Handball (11–1-2) (2)	Atlanta Team Handball (15–1-4) (1) т	New York City THC (13-0-5) (1)	1.
2.	Atlanta Team Handball 10–1-1)	New York City THC (10-0-3) (1)	New York City THC (10-0-3) (2) т	New York Athletic Club (10-0-0) (3)	2.
3.	New York City THC (9-0–1)	Atlanta Metro Condors (12–0-2) (1)	New York Athletic Club (5-0-0) (1)	Atlanta Team Handball (15-1-4)	3.
4.	San Francisco CalHeat (3-0–0)	San Francisco CalHeat (6-0–0)	San Francisco CalHeat (6-0–0)	San Francisco CalHeat (9-0–0)	4.
5.	Garden City (0-0-0) (1)	NJ-Adelphi (10-0-2)	Atlanta Metro Condors (15–0-5)	Atlanta Metro Condors (15–0-5)	5.
	Week 1 Jan 28	Week 2 Feb 14	Week 3 Mar 2	Week 3 Mar 16	
NR	NJ-Adelphi	Los Angeles THC	NJ-Adelphi	NJ-Adelphi	NR
NR	Cleveland	Los Angeles THC	Carolina THC (V)	NJ-Adelphi	NR
NR	Utah	Los Angeles THC	Benedict College (V)	Benedict College (V)	NR
	Week 1 Jan 28	Week 2 Feb 14	Week 3 Mar 2	Week 3 Mar 16	
		Dropped: Cleveland; Garden City; Utah	Dropped: Los Angeles THC	Dropped: Carolina THC (V)	
