= Bank Independent Stadium =

Stadium in Florence, Alabama, U.S.

Bobby Wallace Field at Bank Independent Stadium
- Artist rendering of the new stadium.
- Interactive map of Bobby Wallace Field at Bank Independent Stadium
- Location: Florence, Alabama
- Coordinates: 34°48′33.0″N 87°41′03.8″W
- Owner: University of North Alabama
- Capacity: 10,000

Construction
- Groundbreaking: June 14, 2024
- Opened: September 19, 2026
- Cost: $53.3 Million
- Architect: Davis Architects
- Builder: Fite Building Company
- General contractor: HPM

Tenants
- North Alabama Lions football (NCAA) (2026–present); North Alabama Lions women's soccer (NCAA) (2026–present)

Bank Independent Stadium is a multi-purpose stadium complex by the University of North Alabama in Florence, Alabama, it replaced Braly Stadium and Mike D. Lane Field for athletic events. It consists of a separate football and baseball field.

The football field is named Bobby Wallace Field and the baseball field is named Mike D. Lane Field.

It is built adjacent to Flowers Hall, which houses the UNA basketball and volleyball programs. The stadium will be designed by Davis Architects who previously designed the 2016 renovation of the Stephen C. O'Connell Center and expansions of Bryant–Denny Stadium.

== History ==
=== Background ===
Braly Stadium has served as the home of the North Alabama Lions football team since 1949. Despite its long tenure as host, the main complaint against the stadium was the fact that it was off-campus. The roots for a new stadium can be traced back to 1974 when the university proposed a new 20,000-seat stadium. Despite no location ever being determined, it was stated that it would be near campus. Despite talks of a new stadium starting in the 1970s, it would not be until the late 2010s for a proposal to get serious consideration.

In 2018, the university's SGA created a resolution supporting an on-campus stadium. Following this, the university began exploring the potential of a new stadium. While student input was a key factor in the decision, the university had become aware of the downsides of renting Braly Stadium from the City of Florence. The biggest issue with the rental agreement for Braly was the lack of revenue the university would see from a game. During a press conference at the ground breaking of the new stadium, athletic director Dr. Josh Looney gave an example of how their neutral site game at Toyota Field against Jacksonville State in 2022 produced more revenue for the athletic department than the rest of the season at Braly. These issues, along with the impending jump to Division I, led the university to begin exploring options.

Unofficial designs were unveiled in April 2019 and fundraising began in 2021. However, the stadium was not official until June 2023 when the Board of Trustees unanimously approved the project. It was announced that the stadium would be located at the current Bill Jones Athletic Complex, where both the women's soccer and baseball programs are housed. It was also announced that these programs would join the football team as tenants at the stadium. With the inclusion of the baseball program, it was announced that Bank Independent Stadium would be a multi-purpose stadium complex. After the announcement, the stadium entered a 12 to 16-month designing phase with the goal to complete construction by the 2026–27 academic year.

=== Construction ===
A ground breaking ceremony was held on June 14, 2024, at the Bill Jones Athletic Complex. Demolition on the site began in July when demolition began on Mike D. Lane Field. As demolition started on the stadium, construction started on a new turf practice field and track that is located next to the Hilda B. Anderson Softball Complex. This field will serve as the practice field for the football and women's soccer teams until the stadium is finished in 2026. As the summer and fall continued, crews began digging the bowl for the base off the football field and installing new drainage systems. Work also began on the retaining wall of the new parking lot for Mike D. Lane Field.

On December 6, 2024, the Board of Trustees approved a $53.6 million bid by Fite Building Company to construct Bobby Wallace Field at Bank Independent Stadium. Mike D. Lane Field's construction contract had already been awarded for $12 million. Fite's bid included the seven alternates the university wanted to add to the project. Fite also is the contractor for the new LaGrange Hall dorm that is being built across the street from the Bank Independent Stadium site.

On July 31, 2025, the final steel beam for the project was laid and ceremony was held to commemorate the milestone.

== Mike D. Lane Field at Bank Independent Stadium ==
Mike D. Lane Field at Bank Independent Stadium
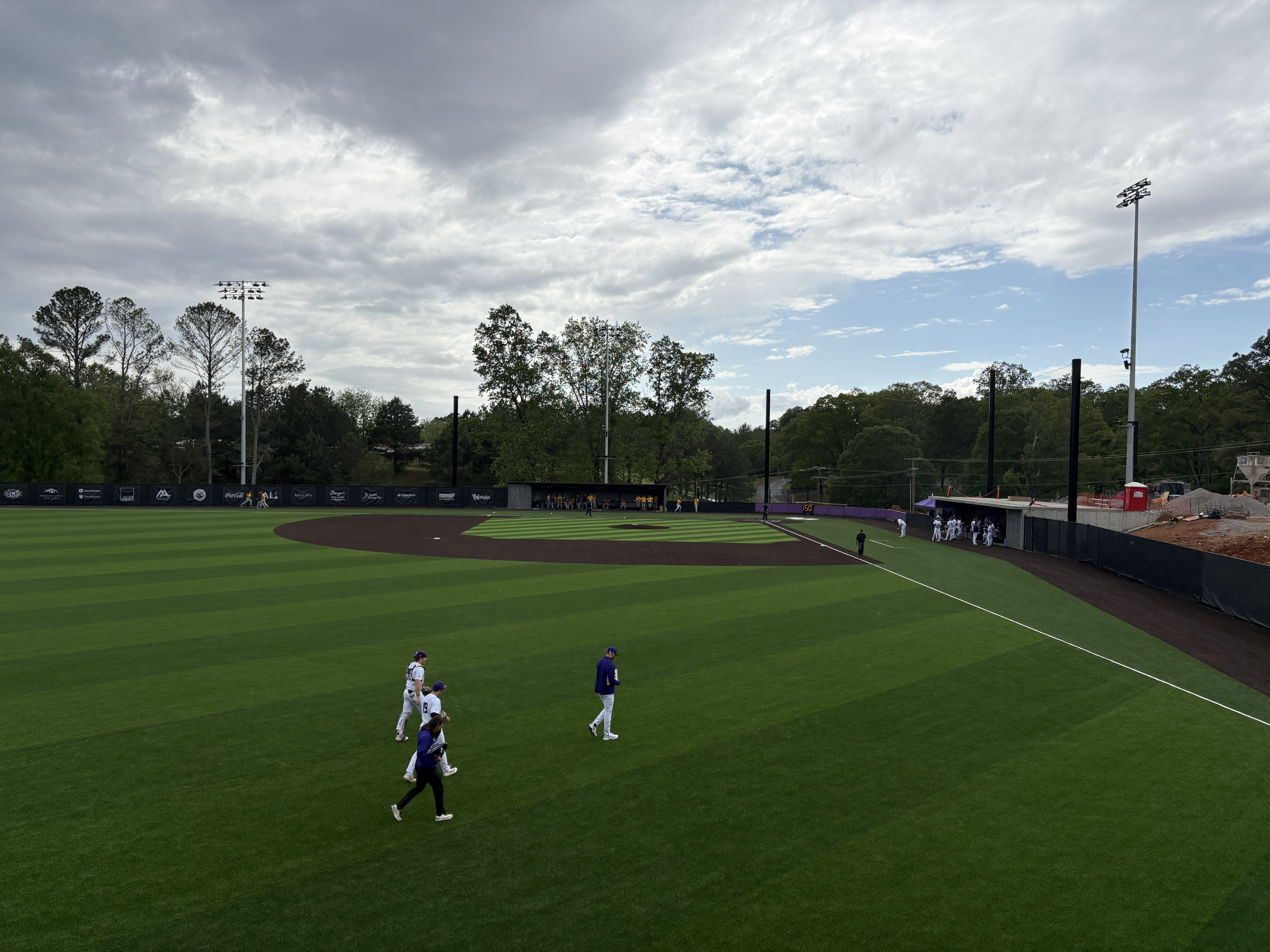
- Mike D. Lane Field in 2025
- Interactive map of Mike D. Lane Field at Bank Independent Stadium
- Location: Florence, Alabama
- Owner: University of North Alabama
- Capacity: ~1400
- Record attendance: 1,350 (Ribbon cutting ceremony vs SIUE, February 14, 2026)
- Field size: Left Field: 310 ft (94 m); Left Center: 380 ft (120 m); Center Field: 405 ft (123 m); Right Center: 389 ft (119 m); Right Field: 330 ft (100 m)

Construction
- Groundbreaking: June 14, 2024
- Opened: April 17, 2025
- Cost: $12 Million
- Architect: Davis Architects
- General contractor: HPM

Tenant
- North Alabama Lions baseball (NCAA) (2025–present)

Mike D. Lane Field at Bank Independent Stadium is a baseball venue in Florence, Alabama. It is a part of the Bank Independent Stadium facility and is adjacent to the future North Alabama football stadium, Bobby Wallace Field. It replaces the old Mike D. Lane Field.

The UNA baseball team played their first game at the new Mike D. Lane Field on April 17, 2025, against the Bellarmine Knights. The Lions were defeated by the Knights 15–5. UNA bounced back the next day and won their first game at the new stadium with a 4–2 victory on April 18. The game also saw Jonathan Lane become the first Division I-era Lion to reach 200 career hits.

They were originally slated to play at the site in March of the 2025 season. Because of this, the early season games in February and March saw neutral site hosts at Toyota Field in Huntsville, Trustmark Park in Jackson, Mississippi, and Young Memorial Field in Birmingham. With further delays to construction, further games were moved to Northwest Shoals Community College's Mark Lee Legacy Field at Patriot Park in Muscle Shoals. One game was also moved to historic Rickwood Field in Birmingham.

Despite the opening game in 2025, construction on the site was incomplete as the press box, stands, and other features were not finished during the season. Fans were limited to watching the games from the College View Church of Christ parking lot, located atop the elevated left field wall. Crowds upward of 300 gathered there during games in the 2025 season.

The Lions officially opened Mike D. Lane Field at Bank Independent Stadium with a mid-February series vs SIUE. Before the third game of the series, on February 14, Mike D. Lane threw out a ceremonial first pitch and was joined by representatives of UNA and Bank Independent to participate in a ribbon cutting ceremony.

== Funding ==
As of the ground breaking, the Board of Trustees had authorized the university to borrow up to $35 million for the project. Donor-wise, the university stated that they had fundraised up to $25 million with hopes that will increase after the ground breaking ceremony.

== Naming ==
Bank Independent Stadium has been the name for the project since its announcement in 2023. No details have been released regarding Bank Independent's naming deal but it has been clear that they are a major donor to the university and the project.

On November 25, 2024, it was announced that the university would name the stadium fields after two all-great UNA coaches: Bobby Wallace and Mike D. Lane. The football field will be named Bobby Wallace Field after Wallace led the Lions to three consecutive Division II national football championships. The baseball field will be named Mike D. Lane Field after Lane coached the UNA Lions baseball for 25 seasons and led the team to the NCAA Division II baseball tournament in 1999. He was also the namesake for UNA's previous baseball field, which was also named Mike D. Lane Field.

It was also revealed that the Florence-Lauderdale Convention and Visitors Bureau will be the presenting sponsor for the football field. While no amount for the sponsorship was revealed, the naming rights for the football field were listed at $3.5 million before the announcement.
