= Mike D. Lane Field =

Baseball park at the University of North Alabama

- Interactive map of Mike D. Lane Field
- Former names: University Field (1984–2007)
- Location: 615 N Pine Street; Florence, AL 35630
- Coordinates: 34.809256°N 87.685569°W
- Owner: University of North Alabama
- Operator: University of North Alabama
- Capacity: 1,500
- Surface: Grass
- Scoreboard: Electronic
- Field size: Left Field: 330 feet (100 m); Center Field: 385 feet (117 m); Right Field: 320 feet (98 m)

Construction
- Built: 1983
- Opened: 1984
- Closed: May 12, 2024
- Demolished: July 2, 2024

Tenant
- North Alabama Lions baseball (NCAA DI ASUN) (1984–2024)

Mike D. Lane Field was a baseball venue in Florence, Alabama, United States. It was home to the North Alabama Lions baseball team of the NCAA Division I ASUN Conference. The facility had a capacity of 1,500 spectators and is named for former head coach Mike D. Lane who has the most wins in North Alabama history.

== History ==
Play began at University Field in 1984 as Mike D. Lane took over as coach of the Lions baseball team.

In 1989, the stadium held its first ever NCAA Regional Tournament as the Lions beat two other Gulf South opponents to take home the regional championship.

In 1990, the stadium would host its first ever night game.

University Field would go on to host the NCAA Regional Tournament three more times (1995, 1997, 1999).

In 2008, University Field would undergo a major renovation. New grandstands and a new entrance way was added to the stadium. 2008 also saw a new name for the facility. In honor of his retirement, University Field would be renamed Mike D. Lane Field.

On April 3, 2019, the city of Florence gifted the university a plot of land next to the softball field to relocate Mike D. Lane Field. Mike D. Lane Field will be demolished after the 2024 season to make way for Bank Independent Stadium and an adjacent new baseball facility. The stadium held its last game on May 12th as the Lions tied 4-4 with North Florida as the game ended after the 13th inning due to the Ospreys’ travel curfew.

The demolition of Mike D. Lane Field began on July 2, 2024 as the grandstands were torn down and the lighting fixtures were removed from the site.

== Features ==
The field's features include a grass playing surface, a press box, an electronic scoreboard, dugouts, a brick backstop, restrooms, and concessions.

== See also ==
- List of NCAA Division I baseball venues
