= Arvin Gymnasium =

Military sport venue in West Point, New York

- Interactive map of Arvin Gymnasium
- Location: Brewerton Road Rd; West Point, NY 10996
- Coordinates: 41°23′35″N 73°57′39″W
- Owner: United States Military Academy
- Operator: United States Military Academy

Construction
- Opened: re-opened: 2005

Tenants
- Army Black Knights (NCAA); Wrestling; Non-varsity sports West Point Team Handball

Arvin Gymnasium is a multi-purpose sport venue on the campus of United States Military Academy in West Point, New York. The building hosts two basketball courts, rock climbing wall, weight room, racquetball courts and boxing rooms. It is the home of the Army wrestling program.
