= 2009 USA Team Handball Nationals =

- Logo of the 2009 Nationals
- Season: 2008-09
- Champion: Men's Elite: New York City THC; Women's Open: Chicago Inter
- All statistics correct as of 2019-05-20.

The 2009 Nationals was the 39th Men's Elite and Women's Nationals. The Nationals was a team handball tournament to determined the National Champion from 2019 from the US.

== Final ranking ==
=== Men's Elite ranking ===
Rank	Team
1st place, gold medalist(s)	New York City THC
2nd place, silver medalist(s)	Houston Firehawks
3rd place, bronze medalist(s)	New York Athletic Club
4	Los Angeles THC
5	ATH United
6	San Francisco CalHeat
7	DC DiplomatsCondors
8	West Point
9	Chicago Inter Red
10	New England Freeze
11	Florida Hurricanes
12	Knight Air
13	Chicago Inter Blue
14	New York City THC II
15	Carolina THC
16	Seattle Speed
17	Los Angeles THC II
18	Polish Folklore
19	Minnesota Team Handball
20	Victorious Secret

=== Women's Open ranking ===
Rank	Team
1st place, gold medalist(s)	Chicago Inter
2nd place, silver medalist(s)	Lady Condors
3rd place, bronze medalist(s)	Houston Firehawks
4	New England Freeze
5	Carolina THC
6	Smurfs (San Francisco CalHeat)
7	West Point
