= 2018 USA Team Handball Nationals =

- Logo of the 2018 Nationals
- Season: 2017-18
- Dates: 17 - 20 May 2018
- Champion: Men's Elite: New York City THC; Men's Open: Los Angeles THC; Women's Open: Team Rogue
- All statistics correct as of 2018-08-07.

The 2018 Nationals was the 48th Men's Open & Open and Women's Nationals. The Nationals was a team handball tournament to determined the National Champion from 2018 from the US.

== Final ranking ==
=== Men's Elite ranking ===
| Rank | Team |
|---|---|
| 1st place, gold medalist(s) | New York City THC |
| 2nd place, silver medalist(s) | San Francisco CalHeat |
| 3rd place, bronze medalist(s) | New York Athletic Club |
| 4 | Boston |
| 5 | Chicago Inter |
| 6 | Houston Firehawks |
| 7 | DC Diplomats |
| 8 | West Point Black |

=== Men's Open ranking ===
| Rank | Team |
|---|---|
| 1st place, gold medalist(s) | Los Angeles THC |
| 2nd place, silver medalist(s) | Carolina Blue |
| 3rd place, bronze medalist(s) | New York City THC 2 |
| 4 | Dallas THC |
| 5 | Georgia HC |
| 6 | Long Island Tigers |
| 7 | West Point Gold |
| 8 | New York City THC 3 |
| 9 | Minnesota TH |
| 10 | San Francisco CalHeat 2 |
| 11 | Carolina |

=== Women's Open ranking ===
| Rank | Team |
|---|---|
| 1st place, gold medalist(s) | Team Rogue |
| 2nd place, silver medalist(s) | New York City THC |
| 3rd place, bronze medalist(s) | Québec |
| 4 | Boston THC |
| 5 | DC Diplomats TH |
| 6 | Carolina Blue |
| 7 | San Francisco CalHeat |
| 8 | West Point Black |
| 9 | San Francisco CalHeat 2 |
| 10 | Firehawks THC |
| 11 | West Point Gold |
