= 2024 North American and Caribbean Senior Club Championship =

Tournament details
- Host country: United States
- Venue(s): 1 (in 1 host city)
- Dates: 10–13 July 2024
- Teams: 4 (from 1 confederation)

Final positions
- Champions: (United States) California Eagles (1st title)
- Runners-up: (United States) New York City THC
- Third place: (United States) Los Angeles THC

Tournament statistics
- Matches played: 8
- Goals scored: 471 (58.88 per match)
- Attendance: 730 (91 per match)
- Top scorer(s): Rasmus Bachmann 37 (Los Angeles THC)

The 2024 North American and Caribbean Senior Club Championship was the fifth edition of the North American and Caribbean Senior Club Championship which was a qualifying tournament for the 2024 IHF Men's Club World Championship. It was held at the New Jersey Institute of Technology in Newark, New Jersey, United States from 10 to 13 July 2024.

== Teams ==
Following teams were qualified for the tournament.

Country	Team	Qualified as	League
Mexico	Krakens Handball Club	Winner	Mexican Championship
United States	California Eagles	Winner	USA Team Handball Nationals 2024
United States	New York City THC	Runner-up	USA Team Handball Nationals 2024
United States	Los Angeles THC	Third	USA Team Handball Nationals 2024

== Results ==
Pos	Team	Pld	W	D	L	GF	GA	GD	Pts	Qualification
1	(United States) California Eagles	3	2	0	1	85	69	+16	4	Final
2	(United States) Los Angeles THC (H)	3	2	0	1	98	86	+12	4	Final
3	(United States) New York City THC	3	1	0	2	78	78	0	2	Third place game
4	(Mexico) Krakens Handball Club	3	1	0	2	66	94	−28	2	Third place game

Source: NACHC
Rules for classification: 1) goal difference; 2) number of goals scored.
(H) Hosts

All times are local (UTC−4).

10 July 2024; 17:00	Krakens Handball Club (Mexico)	28–24	(United States) Los Angeles THC	Naimoli Family Athletic and Recreational Facility, Newark, New Jersey; Attendance: 50; Referees: Bertadillo & Castro (MEX)
10 July 2024; 17:00	Robles 6	(12–6)	Boysen 6	Naimoli Family Athletic and Recreational Facility, Newark, New Jersey; Attendance: 50; Referees: Bertadillo & Castro (MEX)
10 July 2024; 17:00	1× (yellow card) 2× (suspension)	Report	3× (suspension)	Naimoli Family Athletic and Recreational Facility, Newark, New Jersey; Attendance: 50; Referees: Bertadillo & Castro (MEX)

10 July 2024; 19:30	California Eagles (United States)	36–27	(United States) New York City THC	Naimoli Family Athletic and Recreational Facility, Newark, New Jersey; Attendance: 150; Referees: Mažeika & Gatelis (LTU)
10 July 2024; 19:30	Dhouioui & Reed 7	(16–13)	Drame & Puchert 5	Naimoli Family Athletic and Recreational Facility, Newark, New Jersey; Attendance: 150; Referees: Mažeika & Gatelis (LTU)
10 July 2024; 19:30	1× (yellow card) 4× (suspension)	Report	1× (yellow card) 6× (suspension)	Naimoli Family Athletic and Recreational Facility, Newark, New Jersey; Attendance: 150; Referees: Mažeika & Gatelis (LTU)

11 July 2024; 17:00	Los Angeles THC (United States)	23–15	(United States) California Eagles	Naimoli Family Athletic and Recreational Facility, Newark, New Jersey; Attendance: 50; Referees: Bertadillo & Castro (MEX)
11 July 2024; 17:00	Jerry 7	(11–9)	Kerst & Reed 3	Naimoli Family Athletic and Recreational Facility, Newark, New Jersey; Attendance: 50; Referees: Bertadillo & Castro (MEX)
11 July 2024; 17:00	5× (suspension)	Report	1× (yellow card) 5× (suspension)	Naimoli Family Athletic and Recreational Facility, Newark, New Jersey; Attendance: 50; Referees: Bertadillo & Castro (MEX)

11 July 2024; 19:30	New York City THC (United States)	36–19	(Mexico) Krakens Handball Club	Naimoli Family Athletic and Recreational Facility, Newark, New Jersey; Attendance: 50; Referees: Mažeika & Gatelis (LTU)
11 July 2024; 19:30	Aboubacar 8	(17–6)	Lopez 9	Naimoli Family Athletic and Recreational Facility, Newark, New Jersey; Attendance: 50; Referees: Mažeika & Gatelis (LTU)
11 July 2024; 19:30	2× (suspension)	Report	5× (suspension)	Naimoli Family Athletic and Recreational Facility, Newark, New Jersey; Attendance: 50; Referees: Mažeika & Gatelis (LTU)

12 July 2024; 17:00	Krakens Handball Club (Mexico)	19–34	(United States) California Eagles	Naimoli Family Athletic and Recreational Facility, Newark, New Jersey; Attendance: 30; Referees: Bertadillo & Castro (MEX)
12 July 2024; 17:00	Agramon 5	(5–16)	4 players each 5	Naimoli Family Athletic and Recreational Facility, Newark, New Jersey; Attendance: 30; Referees: Bertadillo & Castro (MEX)
12 July 2024; 17:00	2× (suspension)	Report	3× (suspension)	Naimoli Family Athletic and Recreational Facility, Newark, New Jersey; Attendance: 30; Referees: Bertadillo & Castro (MEX)

12 July 2024; 19:30	Los Angeles THC (United States)	31–35	(United States) New York City THC	Naimoli Family Athletic and Recreational Facility, Newark, New Jersey; Attendance: 100; Referees: Mažeika & Gatelis (LTU)
12 July 2024; 19:30	Boysen 11	(14–16)	Aboubacar 11	Naimoli Family Athletic and Recreational Facility, Newark, New Jersey; Attendance: 100; Referees: Mažeika & Gatelis (LTU)
12 July 2024; 19:30	1× (yellow card) 4× (suspension)	Report	1× (yellow card) 4× (suspension) 1× (red card)	Naimoli Family Athletic and Recreational Facility, Newark, New Jersey; Attendance: 100; Referees: Mažeika & Gatelis (LTU)

== Third place game ==
13 July 2024
11:00
Krakens Handball Club (Mexico)
49–50 (ET)
(United States) Los Angeles THC
Naimoli Family Athletic and Recreational Facility, Newark, New Jersey
Attendance: 150
Referees: Bertadillo & Castro (MEX)
Melendez 14
(19–19)
Bachmann 15
6× (suspension) 1× (red card)
Report
4× (suspension) 1× (red card)

FT: 36-36 ET: 5-5, 5-5 Pen: 3-4

== Final ==
13 July 2024; 13:00	California Eagles (United States)	24–21	(United States) New York City THC	Naimoli Family Athletic and Recreational Facility, Newark, New Jersey; Attendance: 150; Referees: Mažeika & Gatelis (LTU)
13 July 2024; 13:00	Kerst 11	(12–11)	Malki 6	Naimoli Family Athletic and Recreational Facility, Newark, New Jersey; Attendance: 150; Referees: Mažeika & Gatelis (LTU)
13 July 2024; 13:00	5× (suspension)	Report	2× (yellow card) 2× (suspension)	Naimoli Family Athletic and Recreational Facility, Newark, New Jersey; Attendance: 150; Referees: Mažeika & Gatelis (LTU)

== Final standing ==
Rank	Team
1st place, gold medalist(s)	(United States) California Eagles
2nd place, silver medalist(s)	(United States) New York City THC
3rd place, bronze medalist(s)	(United States) Los Angeles THC
4	(Mexico) Krakens Handball Club

Team qualified to the 2024 IHF Men's Club World Championship

2023 North American and Caribbean Senior Club Champions

California Eagles
First title

Team roster: Martin Hidalgo, Aljaz Supovec, Hassen Dhouioui, Yan Victorov, Felix Kerst, Luca Engler, Maxime Bouschet, Juan Astegiano, Andrew Donlin, Ole Andreas Olsen, Benedikt Damm, Hjalte Clausen, Kasper Øgendahl, Mohammad Sadraei, Ty Reed, Lucas Kroeger; Coach: Danilo Rojevic

== Top Scorers ==
#	Player	Team	G	⌀
1.	(Denmark) Rasmus Bachmann	(United States) Los Angeles THC	31	7.75
2.	(Norway) Kennie Boysen	(United States) Los Angeles THC	28	7.00
3.	(Guinea) Togba Aboubacar	(United States) New York City THC	27	6.75
4.	(Mexico) Benjamin Melendez	(Mexico) Krakens Handball Club	23	5.75
4.	(Mexico) Héctor Lopez	(Mexico) Krakens Handball Club	23	5.75
6.	(Germany) Felix Kerst	(United States) California Eagles THC	20	5.00
7.	(Guinea) Bambo Drame	(United States) New York City THC	19	4.75
8.	(Mexico) Juan Rodarte	(Mexico) Krakens Handball Club	17	4.25
9.	(Netherlands) Ephrahim Jerry	(United States) Los Angeles THC	16	4.00
10.	(Germany) Mats Puchert	(United States) New York City THC	15	3.75

== Official website ==
Official website
