= Andrew Donlin =

American handball player

Drew Donlin
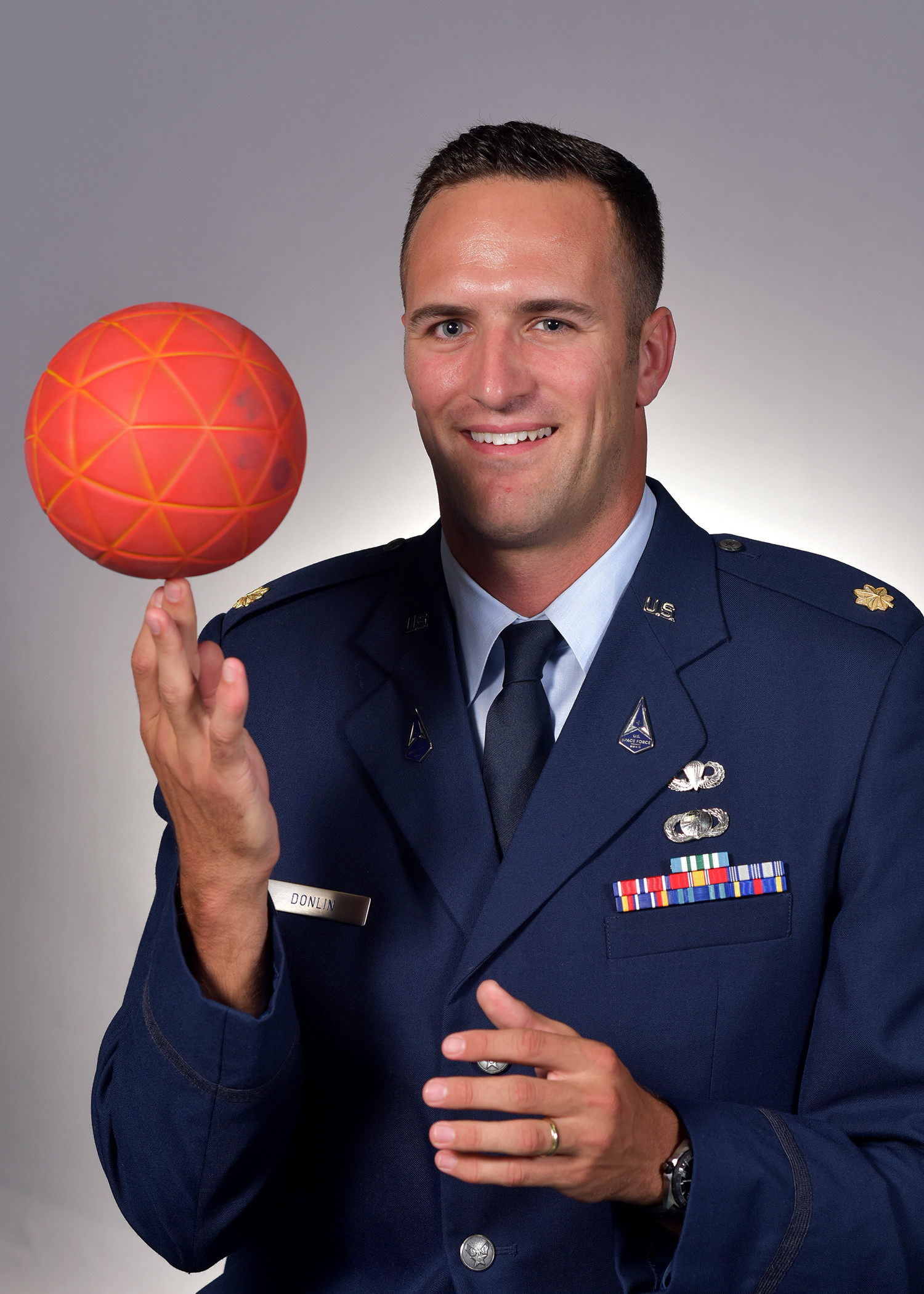
- Andrew Donlin in Space Force uniform

Personal information
- Full name: Andrew Lawrence Donlin
- Born: October 9, 1992 (age 34) Plymouth, Minnesota, U.S.
- Height: 202 cm (6 ft 7 1/2 in)

Sport
- Sport: Handball
- Position: Pivot
- Current club: California Eagles

Youth career
- Years: Team
- 2011–2015: USAFA Team Handball

Senior clubs
- Years: Team
- 2016: Knight Air
- 2017: Revol
- 2017: Knight Air
- 2018: Los Angeles THC
- 2018–2019: TSV Bayer Dormagen
- 2019: Los Angeles THC
- 2019–2021: Abanca Ademar León
- 2021-2023: San Francisco CalHeat
- 2024–: California Eagles
National team
Years	Team		
2012	Handball (Junior)		
2016–	United States	40	(65)
2016–	Beach handball		
Medal record
Nor.Ca. Championship
Gold medal – first place	2026 United States
- Military career
- Allegiance: United States
- Branch: United States Air Force; United States Space Force
- Service years: 2015 – 2021 (Air Force); 2021 – present (Space Force)
- Rank: Major

Andrew Lawrence Donlin (born 9 October 1992) is an American professional handball player and a United States Air Force Captain. His nickname is Captain America.

== High school ==
Donlin played American football, basketball and baseball for Wayzata High School in Plymouth, Minnesota.

== College ==
Donlin began attending the United States Air Force Academy in 2011.

He attended a walk-on tryout for the football team, where they encouraged him to play handball. Later he joined the USAFA Team Handball.

In 2012 Donlin played in the 2012 IHF Trophy Tournament PATHF–North America Zone in Mexico City with the United States men's national junior handball team. The team finished in fourth lost the third place game 38–40 against Canada.

In 2014 he became top scorer with 27 goals at the 2014 USA Team Handball College Nationals - Men's Division. They won the bronze medal.

Donlin captained the USAFA squad at the 2015 Summer Universiade represented the national team. He was captain of the team. They had additionally one student from the Colorado State University. They finished 13th out of 13 teams.

He graduated from the academy with a Bachelor of Science in Management.

== Adult ==
In July 2015, Donlin was assigned as Acquisition Program Manager at the Space and Missile Systems Center in Los Angeles.

In 2016 he made his United States men's national handball team debut at the 2016 Pan American Men's Handball Championship. The team finished in 8th place. His United States national beach handball team debut came the same year at the 2016 Beach Handball World Championships. This was the first World Championship appearance for the US and Donlin was the top scorer of the team.

At the 2018 Pan American Men's Beach Handball Championship he was the top scorer of the tournament and the team won the bronze medal.

He finished sixth in scoring at the 2018 Men's Beach Handball World Championships.

He played for the Los Angeles THC at the 2019 USA Team Handball Nationals, as they won the title.

In November 2018 he became a member of the United States Air Force World Class Athlete Program.

In December 2018 he played his first game for TSV Bayer Dormagen (DE).

He played at the 2019 Pan American Games.

Donlin played for the United States team that won the 2019 Nor.Ca. Men's Beach Handball Championship, which qualified them for the 2019 World Beach Games The team finished 5th at the 2019 IHF Emerging Nations Championship.

He played for the Los Angeles THC at the 2019 North American and the Caribbean Senior Club Championship (3rd) and 2019 USA Team Handball Nationals (4th).

In August 2019 he joined CB Ademar León, a professional Liga ASOBAL club. He became the first American handball player to play in a European club competition when he played in the 2019–20 EHF Cup. Ademar León were eliminated in the group stage.

In 2020 he was awarded with the 2019 United States Air Force Athlete of the Year title.

In August 2021 he left the World Class Athlete Program and joined the newly formed United States Space Force as Program Manager, Special Programs in Los Angeles. Upon his return to the United States, he joined San Francisco CalHeat, the USA Team Handball reigning champion, and won the 2021 North American and Caribbean Senior Club Championship, a qualifying tournament for the IHF Men's Super Globe. From then on, he became a key player for his club, winning the 2022 and 2023 USA Team Handball Nationals, as well as the 2023 North American and Caribbean Senior Club Championship. In 2023, he made his first appearance at the 2023 IHF Super Globe, winning the first ever game in the competition for a North American team. Early in 2024, he transferred to California Eagles, a newly founded club based out of Los Angeles, with whom he won the 2024 USA Team Handball Nationals and the 2024 North American and Caribbean Senior Club Championship.

In 2024 he was awarded with the 2023 United States Air Force Athlete of the Year title for the second time after the 2019 title.

== Family ==
Donlin is the oldest of four children and his sister, Colleen Donlin, who is an NCAA Division I swimmer at Liberty University in Lynchburg, Virginia.

== Military ==
=== Ranks ===
Rank	Date of Promotion
Various	
BCT Squadron Commander	July 2014
Squadron Commander	August 2014
Second Lieutenant	May 2015
First Lieutenant	May 2017
Captain Air Force	May 2019
Captain Space Force	August 2021
Captain (New Insignia)	March 2024
Major	2024

=== Awards and decorations ===
Awards as of 13 June 2023:

Parachutist Badge
Basic Acquisition and Financial Management Badge
Joint Service Commendation Medal
Air and Space Organizational Excellence Award	National Defense Service Medal	Air and Space Achievement Medal
Global War on Terrorism Service Medal	Air and Space Longevity Service Award	Air and Space Training Ribbon
