= Athena Del Rosario =

American handball and beach handball player

Personal information
- National team: United States
- Born: August 22, 1982 (age 43) Los Angeles, U.S.
- Height: 173 cm (5 ft 8 in)
- Weight: 71 kg (157 lb)

Sport
- Sport: Handball and Beach handball
- Position: Goalkeeper
Medal record
Women's beach handball
Representing the (United States) United States
IHF Beach Handball Global Tour
Bronze medal – third place	2023 Marica	Team

Athena Del Rosario (born 22 August 1982) is an American handball and beach handball player, as well as a former college footballer. She is known for her public visibility as a transgender athlete, and was part of the United States women's beach handball team.

== Career ==
=== Club career ===
Athena Del Rosario played college soccer as a goalkeeper at Los Angeles Valley College in 2013-14, and subsequently at the University of California, Santa Cruz in 2015-16. In 2015, she played 13 games including seven of them as a starter, as the team won the Great South Athletic Conference title and secured qualification for the NCAA tournament.

After college, Del Rosario chose to play handball and beach handball with San Francisco CalHeat. In 2019, they competed in beach handball for the RIP Beach Handball Club in Los Angeles, with which they won the SoCal Beach Handball Championship held in Huntington Beach.

=== International career ===
Based on her performance with the club, Del Rosario was selected to be part of the United States women's beach handball team for the 2018 Women's Beach Handball World Championships held at Kazan, Russia, and was an unused substitute throughout the event. In June 2019, she made her international debut for the national team in the friendly matches held in Paros where United States competed against various European teams such as France and Greece. In the same year, she took part in the North and Caribbean Beach Handball Championship and the World Beach Games in Qatar with the national team.

In 2023, Del Rosario was part of the United States squad for the first leg of the 2023 IHF Beach Handball Global Tour held at Marica, Rio de Janeiro. The United States team won the bronze medal in the tournament after defeating Mexico in the third place match of the women's tournament.

=== Honors ===
United States national team

- 1 x bronze medal, 2023 IHF Beach Handball Global Tour

Clubs

- 1 x Vancouver Cup (2019)
- 1 x Texas Cup (2020)
- 1 x SoCal Beach Handball Championship (2019)
- 1 x Great South Athletic Conference (2015)

== Personal life ==
Del Rosario publicly revealed her identity as a trans woman during her time at the university. She has defended the participation of trans athletes in sport. In various interviews with Outsports, Del Rosario recounted her experience in college soccer, the support received from her University of California colleagues and her wish to see other trans athletes compete without feeling isolated. She has also mentioned her wife as one of her sources of personal inspiration.
