= 2019 USA Team Handball Nationals – women's open division =

2019 USA Team Handball Nationals – Women's Open Division
- Season: 2018–19
- Dates: 24 – 26 May 2019
- Champion: New York City THC
- Matches played: 20
- Goals scored: 892 (44.6 per match)
- All statistics correct as of 2020-08-18.

The 2019 Nationals was the 49th Women's Nationals. The Nationals was a team handball tournament to determine the National Champion from 2019 in the US.

== Venues ==
The championship was played at four courts at the Myrtle Beach Sports Center in Myrtle Beach, South Carolina.

Location of the Myrtle Beach Sports Center

== Modus ==
Location of 2019 USA Team Handball Nationals Women's Open Division Teams.

The eight teams are split in two pools A and B and they play a round robin.

The teams ranked third and fourth in the group were qualified for the 5–8th place crossovers.

The losers from the 5–8th crossovers played a 7th place game and the winners the 5th place game.

The best two teams per group were qualified for the semifinals.

The losers from the semis played a small final and the winners the final.

== Results ==
=== Group stage ===
==== Group A ====
Team	Pld	W	D	L	GF	GA	GD	Pts
Boston THC	3	3	0	0	66	45	+21	6
DC Diplomats	3	2	0	1	66	61	+5	4
San Francisco CalHeat II	3	1	0	2	69	59	+10	2
Philly Team Handball	3	0	0	3	37	73	−36	0

24 May 2019; 9:30 (UTC-4)	Boston	18-11	Philly Team Handball	Court 1, Myrtle Beach Sports Center
24 May 2019; 9:30 (UTC-4)		Report		Court 1, Myrtle Beach Sports Center

24 May 2019; 9:30 (UTC-4)	DC Diplomats	24-22	San Francisco CalHeat II	Court 2, Myrtle Beach Sports Center
24 May 2019; 9:30 (UTC-4)		Report		Court 2, Myrtle Beach Sports Center

24 May 2019; 14:00 (UTC-4)	Philly Team Handball	15-24	DC Diplomats	Court 3, Myrtle Beach Sports Center
24 May 2019; 14:00 (UTC-4)		Report		Court 3, Myrtle Beach Sports Center

24 May 2019; 14:00 (UTC-4)	Boston	24-16	San Francisco CalHeat II	Court 4, Myrtle Beach Sports Center
24 May 2019; 14:00 (UTC-4)		Report		Court 4, Myrtle Beach Sports Center

25 May 2019; 8:00 (UTC-4)	San Francisco CalHeat II	31-11	Philly Team Handball	Court 1, Myrtle Beach Sports Center
25 May 2019; 8:00 (UTC-4)		Report		Court 1, Myrtle Beach Sports Center

25 May 2019; 8:00 (UTC-4)	Boston	24-18	DC Diplomats	Court 2, Myrtle Beach Sports Center
25 May 2019; 8:00 (UTC-4)		Report		Court 2, Myrtle Beach Sports Center

==== Group B ====
Team	Pld	W	D	L	GF	GA	GD	Pts
New York City	3	2	1	0	78	59	+19	5
Chicago Inter	3	2	1	0	81	74	+7	5
Alberta	3	0	1	2	65	75	−10	1
San Francisco CalHeat	3	0	1	2	52	68	−16	1

24 May 2019; 9:30 (UTC-4)	Chicago Inter	26-26	New York City	Court 3, Myrtle Beach Sports Center
24 May 2019; 9:30 (UTC-4)		Report		Court 3, Myrtle Beach Sports Center

24 May 2019; 9:30 (UTC-4)	Alberta	18-18	San Francisco CalHeat	Court 4, Myrtle Beach Sports Center
24 May 2019; 9:30 (UTC-4)		Report		Court 4, Myrtle Beach Sports Center

24 May 2019; 14:00 (UTC-4)	Chicago Inter	25-19	San Francisco CalHeat	Court 1, Myrtle Beach Sports Center
24 May 2019; 14:00 (UTC-4)		Report		Court 1, Myrtle Beach Sports Center

24 May 2019; 14:00 (UTC-4)	New York City	27-18	Alberta	Court 2, Myrtle Beach Sports Center
24 May 2019; 14:00 (UTC-4)		Report		Court 2, Myrtle Beach Sports Center

25 May 2019; 8:00 (UTC-4)	Chicago Inter	30-29	Alberta	Court 3, Myrtle Beach Sports Center
25 May 2019; 8:00 (UTC-4)		Report		Court 3, Myrtle Beach Sports Center

25 May 2019; 8:00 (UTC-4)	San Francisco CalHeat	15-25	New York City	Court 4, Myrtle Beach Sports Center
25 May 2019; 8:00 (UTC-4)		Report		Court 4, Myrtle Beach Sports Center

=== Championship ===
Semifinals
A1	Boston	19
B2	Chicago Inter	23
B1	New York City	26
A2	DC Diplomats	20

Final
B2	Chicago Inter	28
B1	New York City	34
Small Final
A1	Boston	15
A2	DC Diplomats	16

==== Semifinals ====
25 May 2019; 16:00 (UTC-4)	Boston	19-23	Chicago Inter	Court 1, Myrtle Beach Sports Center
25 May 2019; 16:00 (UTC-4)		Report		Court 1, Myrtle Beach Sports Center

25 May 2019; 16:00 (UTC-4)	New York City	26-20	DC Diplomats	Court 2, Myrtle Beach Sports Center
25 May 2019; 16:00 (UTC-4)		Report		Court 2, Myrtle Beach Sports Center

==== Small Final ====
26 May 2019; 11:00 (UTC-4)	Boston	15-16	DC Diplomats	Court 1, Myrtle Beach Sports Center
26 May 2019; 11:00 (UTC-4)		Report		Court 1, Myrtle Beach Sports Center

==== Final ====
26 May 2019; 11:30 (UTC-4)	Chicago Inter	28-34	New York City	Court 2, Myrtle Beach Sports Center
26 May 2019; 11:30 (UTC-4)		Report		Court 2, Myrtle Beach Sports Center

=== Consolation 5-8th Place ===
5-8th Place Semifinals
A3	San Francisco CalHeat II	27
B4	San Francisco CalHeat	25
B3	Alberta	33
A4	Philly Team Handball	20

5th Place
A3	San Francisco CalHeat II	27
B3	Alberta	30
7th Place
B4	San Francisco CalHeat	21
A4	Philly Team Handball	14

==== 5-8th Place Semifinals ====
25 May 2019; 12:30 (UTC-4)	San Francisco CalHeat II	27-25	San Francisco CalHeat	Court 1, Myrtle Beach Sports Center
25 May 2019; 12:30 (UTC-4)		Report		Court 1, Myrtle Beach Sports Center

25 May 2019; 12:30 (UTC-4)	Alberta	33-20	Philly Team Handball	Court 4, Myrtle Beach Sports Center
25 May 2019; 12:30 (UTC-4)		Report		Court 4, Myrtle Beach Sports Center

==== 7th Place ====
26 May 2019; 9:30 (UTC-4)	San Francisco CalHeat	21-14	Philly Team Handball	Court 4, Myrtle Beach Sports Center
26 May 2019; 9:30 (UTC-4)		Report		Court 4, Myrtle Beach Sports Center

==== 5th Place ====
26 May 2019; 9:30 (UTC-4)	San Francisco CalHeat II	27-30	Alberta	Court 1, Myrtle Beach Sports Center
26 May 2019; 9:30 (UTC-4)		Report		Court 1, Myrtle Beach Sports Center

== Final ranking ==
Rank	Team
1st place, gold medalist(s)	New York City THC
2nd place, silver medalist(s)	Chicago Inter
3rd place, bronze medalist(s)	DC Diplomats
4	Boston THC
5	Alberta
6	San Francisco CalHeat II
7	San Francisco CalHeat
8	Philly Team Handball

== Statistics ==
=== Awards ===
Most Valuable Player:	Noelia Anton Bolanos	Boston Team Handball Club
Most Valuable Goalkeeper:	Athena Del Rosario	San Francisco CalHeat
Top Scorer:	Kathrine Agger	San Francisco CalHeat II

=== Top scorers ===
Rank	Name	Goals	Games	Average	Team
1st place, gold medalist(s)	Kathrine Agger	38	5	5.6	San Francisco CalHeat II
2nd place, silver medalist(s)	player	0	5	3.17	team

=== All-Tournament Team ===
Pivot

Helen Moser

New York City THC

Center Back

Left Back
Manuella Gama
Right Back

Danka Stefanovic
Chicago Inter
Louise Ganitis

Chicago Inter

New York City THC

Left Wing

Goalkeeper

Right Wing
Noelia Anton Bolanos

Athena Del Rosario

Camila Ramos de Souza
Boston Team Handball Club

San Francisco CalHeat

Chicago Inter

Most Valuable Goalkeeper
