= 2019 North American and Caribbean Senior Club Championship =

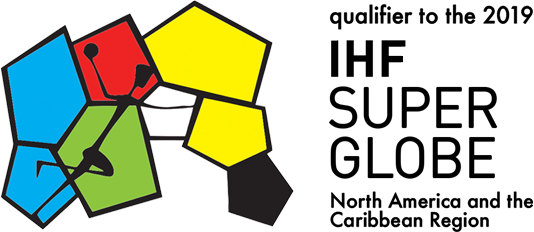

Tournament details
- Host country: United States
- Venue: 1 (in 1 host city)
- Dates: 2019
- Teams: 3 (from 1 confederation)

Final positions
- Champions: (United States) New York City THC
- Runners-up: (Canada) Handball Québec
- Third place: (United States) Los Angeles THC

Tournament statistics
- Matches played: 3
- Goals scored: 185 (61.67 per match)
- Attendance: 170 (57 per match)
- Top scorers: Benjamin Briffe; Anderson Seidel (20 goals)

Awards
- Best player: Benjamin Briffe

The 2019 North American and Caribbean Senior Club Championship was the first edition of the North American and Caribbean Senior Club Championship which is a qualifying tournament for the 2019 IHF Super Globe. It was held in Lake Placid, United States at the United States Olympic Training Center from 9 to 12 May 2019.

== Venue ==
The championship was played in Lake Placid, at the United States Olympic Training Center (LPOTC).

| Lake Placid | 2019 North American and Caribbean Senior Club Championship is located in the United States |
|---|---|
| United States Olympic Training Center; Capacidad: ? | 2019 North American and Caribbean Senior Club Championship is located in the United States |

== Teams ==
Locations of the 2019 North American and Caribbean Senior Club Championship teams

Following teams participated at the qualifying tournament.

Team
(United States) New York City THC
(United States) Los Angeles THC
(Canada) Handball Québec
~~(Puerto Rico) Academia de Balonmano de Río Grande Guerrilleros~~*

- Cancellation by Río Grande

== Referees ==
Referees
| Mexico | Juan Cobá; Omar Osalde |
| Germany | Robert Schulze; Tobias Tönnies |

== Results ==
| Pos | Team | Pld | W | D | L | GF | GA | GD | Pts | Qualification |
|---|---|---|---|---|---|---|---|---|---|---|
| 1 | (United States) New York City THC (H) | 2 | 2 | 0 | 0 | 68 | 62 | +6 | 4 | 2019 IHF Super Globe |
| 2 | (Canada) Handball Québec | 2 | 1 | 0 | 1 | 60 | 59 | +1 | 2 | |
| 3 | (United States) Los Angeles THC | 2 | 0 | 0 | 2 | 57 | 64 | −7 | 0 | |

Source: Super Globe 2019
Rules for classification: 1) points; 2) points in the games between teams in question; 3) goal difference in the games between teams in question; 4) number of goals scored in the games between teams in question; 5) goal difference; 6) number of goals scored.
(H) Hosts

All times are local (UTC-4).

| 10 May; 15:00 | Los Angeles THC (United States) | 32–34 | (United States) New York City THC | LPOTC, Lake Placid; Attendance: 50; Referees: Schulze, Tönnies (GER) |
| 10 May; 15:00 | Seidel 14 | (15–19) | Briffe 12 | LPOTC, Lake Placid; Attendance: 50; Referees: Schulze, Tönnies (GER) |
| 10 May; 15:00 | 3× (yellow card) 7× (suspension) | Report | 3× (yellow card) 5× (suspension) | LPOTC, Lake Placid; Attendance: 50; Referees: Schulze, Tönnies (GER) |

| 11 May; 15:00 | Handball Québec (Canada) | 30–25 | (United States) Los Angeles THC | LPOTC, Lake Placid; Attendance: 50; Referees: Cobá, Osalde (MEX) |
| 11 May; 15:00 | Kip 8 | (17–13) | Pires 11 | LPOTC, Lake Placid; Attendance: 50; Referees: Cobá, Osalde (MEX) |
| 11 May; 15:00 | 2× (suspension) | Report | 1× (yellow card) 2× (suspension) 1× (red card) | LPOTC, Lake Placid; Attendance: 50; Referees: Cobá, Osalde (MEX) |

| 12 May; 12:30 | New York City THC (United States) | 34–30 | (Canada) Handball Québec | LPOTC, Lake Placid; Attendance: 70; Referees: Schulze, Tönnies (GER) |
| 12 May; 12:30 | Briffe 8 | (15–13) | Mercier 9 | LPOTC, Lake Placid; Attendance: 70; Referees: Schulze, Tönnies (GER) |
| 12 May; 12:30 | 1× (yellow card) 3× (suspension) 1× (red card) | Report | 3× (yellow card) 3× (suspension) | LPOTC, Lake Placid; Attendance: 70; Referees: Schulze, Tönnies (GER) |

== Statistics ==
=== Team ===
| # | Team | Penalty card | | Handball | | Penalty card | | Penalty card | |
| # | Team | Σ | ⌀ | Σ | ⌀ | Σ | ⌀ | Σ | ⌀ |
|---|---|---|---|---|---|---|---|---|---|
| 1. | New York City THC | 4 | 2.0 | 8 | 4.0 | 1 | 0.5 | 0 | 0.0 |
| 2. | Handball Quèbec | 3 | 1.5 | 5 | 2.5 | 0 | 0.0 | 0 | 0.0 |
| 3. | Los Angeles THC | 4 | 2.0 | 9 | 4.5 | 1 | 0.5 | 0 | 0.0 |
| Total: | | 11 | 3.7 | 22 | 7.3 | 2 | 0.7 | 0 | 0.0 |

=== Awards ===
| Most Valuable Player: | Benjamin Briffe | New York City THC |
| Most Valuable Goalkeeper: | Justin Danulet | Handball Quèbec |
| Top Scorer: | Benjamin Briffe | New York City THC |
| Top Scorer: | Anderson Seidel | Los Angeles THC |

=== Top Scorers ===
| # | Player | Team | G | ⌀ |
|---|---|---|---|---|
| 1. | Benjamin Briffe | New York City THC | 20 | 10.0 |
| 1. | Anderson Seidel | Los Angeles THC | 20 | 10.0 |
| 3. | Gil Pires | Los Angeles THC | 16 | 8.0 |
| 4. | Erhan Kip | Handball Quèbec | 14 | 7.0 |
| 5. | Etienne Mercier | Handball Quèbec | 13 | 6.5 |
| 6. | Elsayed Shalaby | New York City THC | 11 | 5.5 |
| 6. | Alexandre Touzel | Handball Quèbec | 11 | 5.5 |
| 8. | Djordje Radovanovic | New York City THC | 10 | 5.0 |
| 9. | Stefan Lang | New York City THC | 9 | 4.5 |
| 10. | Cedrick Dupéré | Handball Quèbec | 7 | 3.5 |
| 10. | Omer Man | New York City THC | 7 | 3.5 |

=== Most penalties ===
| # | Player | Team | Penalty card | | Handball | | Penalty card | | Penalty card | |
| # | Player | Team | Σ | ⌀ | Σ | ⌀ | Σ | ⌀ | Σ | ⌀ |
|---|---|---|---|---|---|---|---|---|---|---|
| 1. | Andrew Donlin (USA) | Los Angeles THC | 1 | 0.5 | 2 | 1.0 | 1 | 0.5 | 0 | 0.0 |
| 2. | Benjamin Soccal (BEL) | New York City THC | 1 | 0.5 | 1 | 0.5 | 1 | 0.5 | 0 | 0.0 |
| 3. | Omer Man (ISR) | New York City THC | 1 | 0.5 | 3 | 1.5 | 0 | 0.0 | 0 | 0.0 |
| 4. | Lewis Howes (USA) | Los Angeles THC | 1 | 0.5 | 2 | 1.0 | 0 | 0.0 | 0 | 0.0 |
| 5. | Mohamed Mourad Melki (unknown) | Handball Quèbec | 0 | 0.0 | 2 | 1.0 | 0 | 0.0 | 0 | 0.0 |
| 5. | Erhan Kip (unknown) | Handball Quèbec | 0 | 0.0 | 2 | 1.0 | 0 | 0.0 | 0 | 0.0 |

Minimum 1 red card or 2 × 2 minutes
