= San Francisco CalHeat =

American handball club

- Full name: San Francisco CalHeat Team Handball Club
- Short name: SF CalHeat, CalHeat
- Founded: 1984
- President: Jean-Marc Junique
- Club colours
Home	Away

San Francisco CalHeat is a handball club from the San Francisco Bay Area. It has approximately 100 members (adult and youth), and four teams (women, men junior and youth). The top women's and men's teams compete at the highest level in the United States and have won the national championships multiple times.

On the last weekend of January, San Francisco CalHeat traditionally hosts the California Cup tournament. This is a USA Team Handball sanctioned event and qualifier for the USA Team Handball Nationals.

The main sponsor of the club is Jax Vineyards. In January 2020, San Francisco CalHeat signed a multi-year partnership with Hummel, the Danish manufacturing company of sportswear brand based in Aarhus.

== History ==
The club was founded in 1984 following the continuously growing interest of handball in the San Francisco Bay Area. Back in 1979, Ray Gehrke, considered one of the founding fathers of the sport in California, began an intramural handball program at the Centerville Jr. High School. San Francisco CalHeat was subsequently created in an effort to centralize handball activities in one area.

In 2011, San Francisco CalHeat became a non-profit organization exempt from Federal income tax under section 501 {c} (3) of the Internal Revenue Code. Under the leadership of Bernward Schwarte, President, and Jean-Marc Junique, Vice-President, the club has significantly grown ever since.

In 2016, San Francisco CalHeat started a youth development program and handball league involving numerous schools in the San Francisco Bay Area such as Lycée Français de San Francisco and Leland High School (San Jose, California). In 2019, the program culminated with the organization of summer and winter camps led by Claus Dalgaard-Hansen, former member of the Denmark men's national handball team, and David Degouy, assistant coach and handball academy director of Montpellier Handball.

In 2019, the club got even more exposure abroad after Nicolas Raemy, player of Wacker Thun and longstanding member of the Switzerland national handball team, helped the team win the US men's national championship

In 2021, the club won the North American and Caribbean Men's Club Championship and qualified for the IHF Super Globe. For their inaugural participation, the team finished at the 10th place losing against AlWehda, the Saudi Arabian champion, Al Noor Handball Club, and Al Duhail, the 2020 Asian Men's Club League Handball Championship.

In 2022, the club won another US Men's National Championship in Adrian, Michigan. This is the sixth national title for the men's team, bringing them closer to the all-time greats New York Athletic Club and New York City THC.

One year later, in 2023, the club won both the US Men's National Championship and the Women's Open Division in Spokane, Washington. This is the first time a US handball club wins both the men's and women's national competition in the same year. This also marks the seventh national title for the men's team, tied with New York City THC. A few months later, the club won the North American and Caribbean Men's Club Championship and qualified for the IHF Super Globe. At the 2023 IHF Super Globe, the team recorded its inaugural win against University of Queensland (27-22), marking the first ever win in the competition's history for a US and North American club team.

On October 9, 2023, San Francisco CalHeat became the 105th member of Forum Club Handball, following in the footsteps of New York City THC and Detroit Handball Club.

== Sports Facility Information ==
- Name: – Ray Gehrke Court
- City: – Fremont, California
- Capacity: – 1,000

== Accomplishments ==
=== International ===
- IHF Men's Super Globe (World Club Championship)
  - 2021: 10th
  - 2023: 10th
- North American and Caribbean Senior Club Championship
  - 2021: Gold
  - 2022: Bronze
  - 2023: Gold

=== National ===
- USA Team Handball Nationals
  - Men's Elite Division
    - Gold : 1984, 1985, 1986, 1990, 2019, 2022, 2023
    - Silver : 1987, 2018
    - Bronze : 1996, 2001, 2002
  - Women's Open Division
    - Gold : 2003, 2006, 2023
    - Silver : 1997, 1998, 2004, 2005
    - Bronze : 1995, 1996
  - Men's Open Division
    - Silver : 2022, 2023, 2024
  - Men's Youth Division
    - Gold : 2023
    - Silver : 2022

Due to the COVID-19 pandemic in the United States, the 2020 and 2021 USA Team Handball Nationals were cancelled.

== Teams ==
=== Men's first team ===
Squad for the 2023–24 season

Goalkeepers

- 1 (Germany) Lucas Kröger
- 32 (France) Omar Bentahar
- 99 (United States) Hamadi Balti

Left Wingers

- 3 (France) Raphaël Renault
- 25 (United States) Drew Bradley
- 38 (Norway) Theodor Skogsholm

Right Wingers

- 24 (Germany) Maximilian Euchenhofer
- 36 (Germany) Paul Assfalg
- 51 (Germany) Yannik te Morsche

Line players

- 15 (United States) Andrew Donlin
- 52 (Puerto Rico) Jonathan Anthony García
- 64 (France) Benoît Crouzit

Left Backs

- 14 (Germany) Maximilian Paulus
- 54 (Denmark) Hjalte Nordquist Clausen
- 63 (Norway) Ole Andreas Olsen

Central Backs

- 6 (Taiwan) Tsai Hsien (Joseph) Kuo
- 11 (Japan) Mikio Tada
- 17 (Germany) Florian Schöbinger
- 53 (Denmark) Kasper Ogendahl
- 61 (Spain) Eloy Rubio Blanco (c)

Right Backs

- 19 (Denmark) Daniel Fløe Listh Eggert
- 62 (Cameroon) Zuwed Akuro

Coach

- (Switzerland) Danilo Rojevic
- (Germany) Sören Müller

=== Women's first team ===
Squad for the 2022–23 season

Goalkeepers

- 1 (United States) Athena Del Rosario
- 66 (Germany) Janine McDonald

Left Wingers

- 33 (France) Claire Boussuge
- 43 (Germany) Kerstin Kraemer
- 75 (Iran) Leila Movahedian

Right Wingers

- 6 (Iran) Padideh Deris
- 12 (France) Marine Dunoguier
- 45 (France) Constance Duvert

Line players

- 8 (Argentina) Maria Florencia D'Innocenzo (c)
- 40 (Canada) Alyssa Hoffert

Left Backs

- 15 (Germany) Michelle Mensing
- 31 (Germany) Hannah Baaske
- 41 (Romania) Simona Cipaian

Central Backs

- 5 (Spain) Inés Resano Goizueta
- 32 (Spain) Marina Fidalgo

Right Backs

- 3 (Argentina) Agustina Amiconi
- 23 (Moldova) Liubovi Gurgurova
- 52 (Argentina) Ethel Vallejos

Coach

- (Serbia) Kristina Alavanja
