= Forum Club Handball =

Association of European handball clubs

- Abbreviation: FCH
- Predecessor: Group Club Handball
- Formation: 4 October 2011
- Founded at: Cologne
- Type: Sports organisation
- Headquarters: Cologne, Germany
- Region served: Europe
- President: Xavier O'Callaghan

Forum Club Handball (FCH) represents the top European handball clubs. The organisation was founded on 4 October 2011 as a registered association. The club is based in Cologne. The predecessor association, Group Club Handball, was dissolved on 3 October 2011. FCH represents the interests of the clubs to the European Handball Federation (EHF), the International Handball Federation (IHF), the European Union and others.

The teams are members of the EHF Champions League, the EHF European League, and the top 16 teams of the EHF European Cup, and all national champions.

The president of the FCH is Xavier O'Callaghan (FC Barcelona, Spain), the two vice-presidents are Dierk Schmäschke (SG Flensburg, Germany) and Peter Leutwyler (Kadetten Schaffhausen, Switzerland). Further board members are Janos Szabo (Telekom Veszprem, Hungary), Thierry Omeyer (Paris Saint Germain, France), Julien Deljarry (Montpellier HB, France), Thorsten Storm (THW Kiel, Germany), Gregor Planteu (Celje, Slovenia), Vedran Supukovic (Zagreb, Croatia), Jan Larsen (Aalborg, Denmark), Stathis Papachartofilis (AEK Athens, Greece) Theo Bougouin (London, England), and Shkumbin 'Bini' Mustafa (New York City Team Handball Club). The managing director is Dr. Gerd Butzeck.

The highest body of the FCH is the General Assembly, which usually meets twice a year. The first meeting takes place on the final weekend of the European or World Championships, the second on the weekend of the EHF Champions League Final Four tournament. The General Assembly determines the policy of the FCH. EHF Champions League clubs have the right to four votes, EHF Cup clubs have two votes, and all other clubs have one voting right. Elections are held every four years.

During the general meetings, all business is conducted by the board members. They are elected according to the ranking of the European handball clubs.

The General Assembly elects the club representatives for the various committees of the EHF (Professional Handball Board and Competitions Commission) and the EHF Marketing GmbH (Strategy Committee, Men's Club Board and Advisory Board). President Xavier O'Callaghan is also a member of the Executive Committee of the European Handball Federation.

The cooperation of the Forum Club Handball with the European Handball Federation is regulated by a memorandum of understanding. There is a partnership agreement with the International Handball Federation.
