= 2019 USA Team Handball Nationals – men's elite division =

Handball competition

2019 USA Team Handball Nationals - Men's Elite Division
- Season: 2018–19
- Dates: 24 - 26 May 2019
- Matches played: 20
- All statistics correct as of 2019-05-04.

The 2019 Nationals is the 49th Men's Nationals. The Nationals was a team handball tournament to determine the National Champion from 2019 from the US.

== Venues ==
The championship was played at venues at the Myrtle Beach Sports Center in Myrtle Beach, South Carolina.

Location of the Myrtle Beach Sports Center

== Qualification ==
Competition	Dates	Vacancies	Qualified	Wildcard standings
2018 Nationals - Men's Elite Division	17 - 20 May 2018	1	New York City Team Handball Club	19
2018-19 Midwest Team Handball League	29 September 2018 - 24 March 2019	1	Chicago Inter Handball Club #1	15
2018-19 Northeast Team Handball League	14 October 2018 – 31 March 2019	2	Boston Team Handball #3; DC Diplomats Team Handball #4	7; 0
Wildcards		4	San Francisco CalHeat Team Handball Club; New York Athletic Club; Los Angeles Team Handball Club; Houston Firehawks Team Handball	29; 12; 11; 7

West Point Black (Army) which ranked 2nd at the NTHL and at the Wildcard Standings will not attending the competition. due to graduation.

== Modus ==
Location of 2019 USA Team Handball Nationals Men's Elite Division Teams

The eight teams are split in two pools A and B and they play a round roubin.

The last two teams per group were qualified for the 5-8th place semifinals.

The losers from the 5-8th place semis played a 7th place game and the winners the 5th place game.

The best two teams per group were qualified for the semifinals.

The losers from the semis played a small final and the winners the final.

== Results ==
=== Group stage ===
==== Group A ====
Team	Pld	W	D	L	GF	GA	GD	Pts
New York City (1)	3	3	0	0	95	69	+26	6
Los Angeles (5)	3	2	0	1	90	78	+12	4
Boston (6)	3	1	0	2	65	80	−15	2
Chicago Inter (3)	3	0	0	3	66	89	−23	0

24 May 2019; 11:00 (UTC-4)	New York City	31-29	Los Angeles	Myrtle Beach Sports Center
24 May 2019; 11:00 (UTC-4)		Report		Myrtle Beach Sports Center

24 May 2019; 11:00 (UTC-4)	Chicago Inter	21-23	Boston	Myrtle Beach Sports Center
24 May 2019; 11:00 (UTC-4)		Report		Myrtle Beach Sports Center

24 May 2019; 15:30 (UTC-4)	Boston	19-27	New York City	Myrtle Beach Sports Center
24 May 2019; 15:30 (UTC-4)		Report		Myrtle Beach Sports Center

24 May 2019; 15:30 (UTC-4)	Chicago Inter	24-29	Los Angeles	Myrtle Beach Sports Center
24 May 2019; 15:30 (UTC-4)		Report		Myrtle Beach Sports Center

25 May 2019; 11:00 (UTC-4)	Chicago Inter	21-37	New York City	Myrtle Beach Sports Center
25 May 2019; 11:00 (UTC-4)		Report		Myrtle Beach Sports Center

25 May 2019; 11:00 (UTC-4)	Los Angeles	32-23	Boston	Myrtle Beach Sports Center
25 May 2019; 11:00 (UTC-4)		Report		Myrtle Beach Sports Center

==== Group B ====
Team	Pld	W	D	L	GF	GA	GD	Pts
San Francisco CalHeat (2)	3	3	0	0	93	74	+19	6
New York Athletic Club (4)	3	2	0	1	96	82	+14	4
DC Diplomats (11)	3	1	0	2	80	80	0	2
New York City II (8)	3	0	0	3	67	100	−33	0

24 May 2019; 11:00 (UTC-4)	San Francisco CalHeat	32-20	New York City II	Myrtle Beach Sports Center
24 May 2019; 11:00 (UTC-4)		Report		Myrtle Beach Sports Center

24 May 2019; 11:00 (UTC-4)	DC Diplomats	26-28	New York Athletic Club	Myrtle Beach Sports Center
24 May 2019; 11:00 (UTC-4)		Report		Myrtle Beach Sports Center

24 May 2019; 15:30 (UTC-4)	New York Athletic Club	42-27	New York City II	Myrtle Beach Sports Center
24 May 2019; 15:30 (UTC-4)		Report		Myrtle Beach Sports Center

24 May 2019; 15:30 (UTC-4)	San Francisco CalHeat	32-28	DC Diplomats	Myrtle Beach Sports Center
24 May 2019; 15:30 (UTC-4)		Report		Myrtle Beach Sports Center

25 May 2019; 12:30 (UTC-4)	San Francisco CalHeat	29-26	New York Athletic Club	Myrtle Beach Sports Center
25 May 2019; 12:30 (UTC-4)		Report		Myrtle Beach Sports Center

25 May 2019; 12:30 (UTC-4)	New York City II	20-26	DC Diplomats	Myrtle Beach Sports Center
25 May 2019; 12:30 (UTC-4)		Report		Myrtle Beach Sports Center

=== Championship ===
Semifinals
A1	New York City	32
B2	New York Athletic Club	22
B1	San Francisco CalHeat	28
A2	Los Angeles	23

Final
A1	New York City	30
B1	San Francisco CalHeat	31
Small Final
B2	New York Athletic Club	32
A2	Los Angeles	30

==== Semifinals ====
25 May 2019; 19:00 (UTC-4)	New York City	32-22	New York Athletic Club	Court 2, Myrtle Beach Sports Center; Attendance: 100
25 May 2019; 19:00 (UTC-4)		Report		Court 2, Myrtle Beach Sports Center; Attendance: 100

25 May 2019; 19:00 (UTC-4)	San Francisco CalHeat	28-23	Los Angeles	Court 3, Myrtle Beach Sports Center; Attendance: 150; Referees: Anusic (USA), Kolahdouzan (IRN)
25 May 2019; 19:00 (UTC-4)		Report		Court 3, Myrtle Beach Sports Center; Attendance: 150; Referees: Anusic (USA), Kolahdouzan (IRN)

==== Small Final ====
26 May 2019; 12:30 (UTC-4)	New York Athletic Club	32-30	Los Angeles	Court 4, Myrtle Beach Sports Center; Attendance: 50
26 May 2019; 12:30 (UTC-4)		Report		Court 4, Myrtle Beach Sports Center; Attendance: 50

==== Final ====
26 May 2019; 13:45 (UTC-4)	New York City	30-31	San Francisco CalHeat	Court 2, Myrtle Beach Sports Center; Attendance: 450; Referees: Anusic (USA), Kolahdouzan (IRN)
26 May 2019; 13:45 (UTC-4)	Stefan Lang 11, Benjamin Briffe 6	(11-12)	Eloy Rubio Blanco 10, Nicolas Raemy 8	Court 2, Myrtle Beach Sports Center; Attendance: 450; Referees: Anusic (USA), Kolahdouzan (IRN)
26 May 2019; 13:45 (UTC-4)	2× (yellow card) 3× (suspension)	Report	3× (yellow card) 7× (suspension)	Court 2, Myrtle Beach Sports Center; Attendance: 450; Referees: Anusic (USA), Kolahdouzan (IRN)

=== Consolation ===
5-8th Place Semifinals
A3	Boston	24
B4	New York City II	23
B3	DC Diplomats	31
A4	Chicago Inter	19

5th Place
A3	Boston	25
B3	DC Diplomats	22
7th Place
A4	Chicago Inter	24
B4	New York City II	22

==== 5-8th Place Semifinals ====
25 May 2019; 19:00 (UTC-4)	Boston	24-23	New York City II	Myrtle Beach Sports Center
25 May 2019; 19:00 (UTC-4)		Report		Myrtle Beach Sports Center

25 May 2019; 19:00 (UTC-4)	DC Diplomats	31-19	Chicago Inter	Myrtle Beach Sports Center
25 May 2019; 19:00 (UTC-4)		Report		Myrtle Beach Sports Center

==== 7th Place ====
26 May 2019; 11:00 (UTC-4)	New York City II	22-24	Chicago Inter	Myrtle Beach Sports Center
26 May 2019; 11:00 (UTC-4)		Report		Myrtle Beach Sports Center

==== 5th Place ====
26 May 2019; 11:00 (UTC-4)	Boston	25-22	DC Diplomats	Myrtle Beach Sports Center
26 May 2019; 11:00 (UTC-4)		Report		Myrtle Beach Sports Center

== Final ranking ==
Rank	Team
1st place, gold medalist(s)	San Francisco CalHeat
2nd place, silver medalist(s)	New York City
3rd place, bronze medalist(s)	New York Athletic Club
4	Los Angeles
5	Boston
6	DC Diplomats
7	Chicago Inter
8	New York City II

== Statistics ==
=== Awards ===
Most Valuable Player:	Gil Pires	Los Angeles THC
Most Valuable Goalkeeper:	Lucas Kroeger	San Francisco CalHeat
Top Scorer:	Gil Pires	Los Angeles THC

=== Top scorers ===
Rank	Name	Goals	Games	Average	Team
1st place, gold medalist(s)	Gil Pires	46	5	9.2	Los Angeles
2nd place, silver medalist(s)	Eloy Rubio	35	5	7	SF Calheat
3rd place, bronze medalist(s)	Benjamin Briffe	29	5	5.8	New York City
3rd place, bronze medalist(s)	Nicolas Raemy	29	5	5.8	SF Calheat
3rd place, bronze medalist(s)	Chris Morgan	29	5	5.8	New York Athletic Club

=== All-Tournament Team ===
Pivot

Vladimir Bicvic

New York City THC

Center Back

Left Back
Gil Pires
Right Back

Eloy Rubio
Los Angeles THC
Benjamin Briffe

San Francisco CalHeat

New York City THC

Left Wing

Goalkeeper

Right Wing
Hedi Boubaker

Lucas Kroeger

Nicolas Raemy
New York City THC

San Francisco CalHeat

San Francisco CalHeat
