= Morten Olsen (handballer) =

Danish handball player (born 1984)

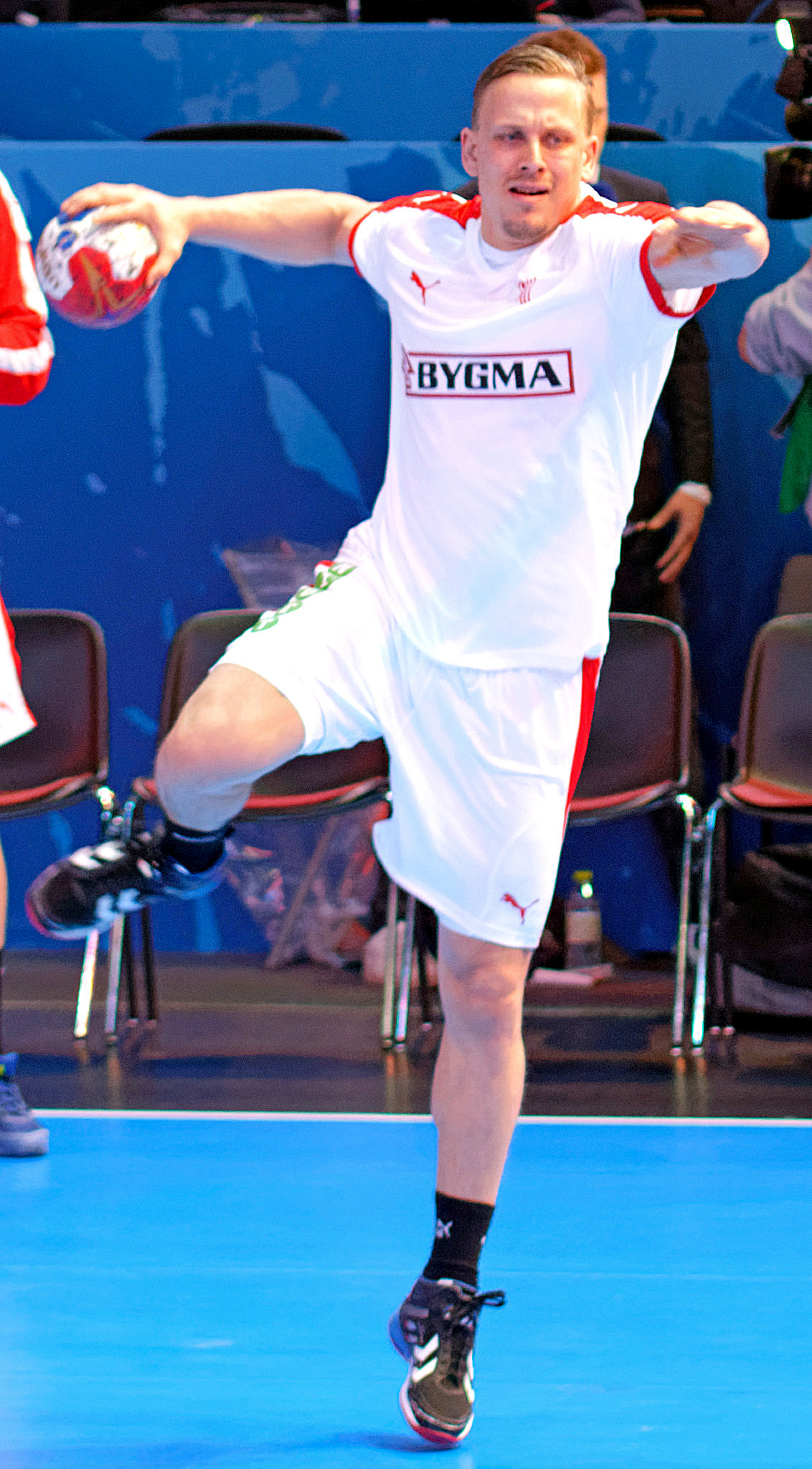
- Olsen attempts a goal against Yann Genty in 2013

Personal information
- Full name: Morten Toft Olsen
- Nationality: Danish
- Born: 11 October 1984 (age 42) Osted, Denmark
- Height: 1.84 m (6 ft 0 in)

Sport
- Sport: Handball
- Position: Centre back
- Current club: Bjerringbro-Silkeborg
- Number: 34

Senior clubs
- Years: Team
- 2003–2005: GOG Gudme
- 2005–2006: HF Mors
- 2006–2007: Viborg HK
- 2007–2010: Bjerringbro-Silkeborg
- 2010–2013: TSV Hannover-Burgdorf
- 2013–2015: Saint-Raphaël Var
- 2015: Al Rayyan SC
- 2015–2020: TSV Hannover-Burgdorf
- 2020–11/2023: GOG Håndbold
- 12/2023–2025: Bjerringbro-Silkeborg
National team
| Years | Team | Apps | (Gls) |
| 2006–2021 | Denmark | 118 | (217) |

Teams managed
- 2025–: Los Angeles Team Handball Club
Medal record
Olympic Games
| Gold medal – first place | 2016 Rio de Janeiro | Team |
| Silver medal – second place | 2020 Tokyo | Team |
World Championship
| Gold medal – first place | 2019 Germany/Denmark |
| Gold medal – first place | 2021 Egypt |
Junior World Championship
| Gold medal – first place | 2005 Hungary |

Morten Toft Olsen (born 11 October 1984) is a Danish handball coach for Los Angeles Team Handball Club and former player. He is a two times world Champion and one time Olympic Champion.

At youth levels he started playing as a wing player, but transitioned to play as a playmaker in his senior years.

== Playing career ==
Olsen started his career at GOG Gudme, where he played from 2003 to 2005. He then joined HF Mors where he played for a single season, where he played together with his twin brother, Kenneth Olsen. In January 2006 he won sold to Viborg HK.

In the summer of 2007 he joined League rivals Bjerringbro-Silkeborg.

In 2010 he joined Bundesliga team TSV Hannover-Burgdorf, where he played until 2013. He then joined French team Saint-Raphaël Var Handball. In 2015 he was released early from his contract with the club to rejoin TSV Hannover-Burgdorf. He has rejoined TSV Hannover-Burgdorf 1 July 2015 after a short-term contract with Al Rayyan SC. In 2020 he returned to Denmark to rejoin GOG Håndbold. In September the same year he won the Danish Cup for a second time. In 2022 he won the Danish championship, and the 2023 he won the double.

At the end of the 2022–23 season he announced his retirement from handball and that he intended to become the assistant coach at TMS Ringsted. He did however quickly reconsider and continued as a player at GOG. In November 2023 he fell out of favour of the GOG coach and left the team due to 'lack of mutual trust'. A few days later he signed for Bjerringbro-Silkeborg until 2025. In April 2025 he announced his intention to retire after the 2024–25 season.

=== National team ===
In 2005 he won the U-21 World Championship. His twin brother Kenneth was also on the team.

He debuted for the Danish national team in 2006, but it would take almost a decade before he became a part of the national team setup on a permanent basis, and even then he often acted as backup.

At the 2016 Olympics he won gold medals with the Danish team; the first ever Olympic gold medal for the Danish men's team.

In 2019 he won the 2019 World Championship with the Danish team; the first time ever that Denmark won the title. In 2021 he defended the title at the 2021 World Championship.

In 2021 he announced his retirement from the national team in order to spend more time with his family.

== Coaching career ==
In November 2025 he was named the head coach of the American handball club Los Angeles Team Handball Club.

== Personal life ==
His twin brother, Kenneth Olsen, is also a handball coach and former player. He currently coaches TMS Ringsted.
