= USA Team Handball Nationals – men's open division =

Tournament information
- Sport: Handball
- Month played: April–May
- Established: 1959
- Format: Round Robin, Knockout Stage

Current champion
- Los Angeles THC II

The men's open national is a USA Team Handball tournament to determine the handball open national champion from the US. This is the second highest level of competition in the United States. Not qualified teams for the men's elite division are allowed to play in this division. Before the men's elite division was established, the national champion was crowned at the open division.

== Results ==
=== Division I ===
Year	Final			Third-place match			Teams
Year	Champions	Score	Runners-up	3rd place	Score	4th place	Teams
1959	3 × Elizabeth S.C. 1963 one title						
1960	3 × Elizabeth S.C. 1963 one title						
1961	3 × Elizabeth S.C. 1963 one title						
1962	3 × Elizabeth S.C. 1963 one title						
1963	3 × Elizabeth S.C. 1963 one title						
1964	3 × Elizabeth S.C. 1963 one title						
1965	3 × Elizabeth S.C. 1963 one title						
1966	3 × Elizabeth S.C. 1963 one title						
1967	Elizabeth S.C.						
1968							
1969	Adelphi University						
1970	Rochester Sport Club		Adelphi University				
1971; Newark State College	Adelphi University	13-8	Army A	Army B	13-11	SSC Newark	8
1972; Livingston, New Jersey	Adelphi University	21-16	Third Army Team				
1973; Fort Bragg, North Carolina	Adelphi University						Cornell University 5th, German Air Force, United States Army, Swim & Sport Club of New Jersey
1974; Monmouth University, New Jersey	Adelphi University		Jersey Jets	Army team from Fort Bragg		Willamette University	10; OSU 6th
1975; Ohio State University, Ohio	Northwest Suburban Chicago	20-18	United States Army	East Ridge	5-2 vs. 4–1–2; Match record	Willamette University	
1976; Ohio State University, Ohio	Swim & Sport Club of Flanders	22-21	Air Force Academy	Northwest Suburban Chicago		United States Army	10
1977; Milwaukee, Wisconsin	Chicago THC		Air Force Academy				
1978; Hofstra University, New York	Air Force Academy						
1979; Colorado Springs, Colorado	University of California, Los Angeles	18-17	United States Army	West Point 3rd or 4th			
1980; Colorado Springs, Colorado							
1981	Jersey Jets						
1982; Colorado Springs, Colorado	West Coast All-Stars						
1983; Washington, D.C.							
1984; California State University, Fullerton	San Francisco CalHeat	25-17	Los Angeles Stars				10; New York Athletic Club (Garden City) (Note: New York Athletic Club played at the beginning with the name Garden City.)
1985	San Francisco CalHeat						
1986; Ohio State University, Ohio	San Francisco CalHeat		Sushi Masters				
1987	Sushi Masters		San Francisco CalHeat	New York Athletic Club (Garden City)			
1988	New York Athletic Club (Garden City)		Sushi Masters	Rangers			
1989; Adelphi University & Nassau Community College, New York	New York Athletic Club (Garden City)		Los Angeles Stars	Sushi Masters			
1990; Reno, Nevada	San Francisco CalHeat	19–17	Condors (Ventura Condors) (Note: The Condors where relocated from Ventura, California to Atlanta)	Sushi Masters			
1991; Oklahoma City, Oklahoma	New York Athletic Club (Garden City)	21–17	Otra Vez	Swim & Sport Club of Flanders	23–19	LA Stars	
1992; Philadelphia, Pennsylvania	New York Athletic Club (Garden City)		Swim & Sport Club of Flanders				
1993; Philadelphia, Pennsylvania	New York Athletic Club II (Garden City II)		Knight Magic	New York Athletic Club I (Garden City I)			
1994	Condors (Ventura Condors)		Sushi Masters	New York Athletic Club (Garden City)			
1995	Sushi Masters		Colorado Stars	New York Athletic Club (Garden City)			
1996	New York Athletic Club (Garden City)		Sushi Masters	San Francisco CalHeat			
1997	New York Athletic Club (Garden City)		Condors (Ventura Condors)	Crachovia			
1998; Atlanta, Georgia	Knight Magic	19–18	New York Athletic Club (Garden City)	West Point	Shoot Out	Condors (Ventura Condors)	10
1999; Fresno, California	Condors (Atlanta Condors)	20–14	New York Athletic Club (Garden City)	Knight Air	24–19	Cracovia	
	↓ National Championship is new the Elite Division ↓						
2000; Tampa, Florida	New York City THC		Condors (Condor Old)	Swim & Sport Club of Flanders		Atlanta THB-1	8
2001; Atlanta, Georgia	USA Deaf		West Point Black	Swim & Sport Club of Flanders		Carolina Blue	8
2002; Nassau Community College, NY	Atlanta THC		New York City THC	University of North Carolina at Chapel Alumni		Air Force Academy	8
2003; Reno, Nevada	New England Freeze	20-11	Los Angeles THC	Sushi Masters	23-19	Knight Air DOGs	8
2004; Houston, Texas	Air Force Academy	23-22	Houston Firehawks TH	Swim & Sport Club of Flanders	24-18	Rock Handball	7
2005	University of Utah		Vipers Cleveland TH	PLS Firehawks		USA Deaf	16
2006; Houston, Texas	West Point Gold	28-22	University of North Carolina at Chapel Alumni	Atlanta Metro	20-11	West Point Black	8
2007; University of Delaware, DE	Chicago Inter THC	28-27	Knight Air	New England Freeze	38-16	West Point Gold	
2008; Newark, Delaware							
2009; Elgin, Illinois	Only an Elite Division was held						0
2010; Las Vegas, Nevada	Miami Storm A	29-26	Minnesota	Denver HC		Seattle Handball Club	13
2011; Salt Lake City, Utah	New York Athletic Club	29-22	Georgia HC	Seattle Handball Club	22-16	Los Angeles 2 THC	8 New York City 2 THC; Tusken Raiders
2012; Minneapolis, Minnesota	New York Athletic Club		West Point Gold	Georgia HC	34-26	Minnesota	Ohio
2013; Reno, Nevada	Denver HC	25-20	Georgia HC	New York City 2 THC		West Point Gold	11
2014; Reno, Nevada	Boston THC	24-22	West Point Gold	Air Force Academy	39-32	San Francisco CalHeat	12
2015; York, Pennsylvania	Houston Firehawks TH	29-19	Georgia HC	Air Force Academy	27-19	West Point Gold	17
2016; York, Pennsylvania	Houston Firehawks TH	23-17	Georgia HC	Air Force Academy		Ontario	11
2017; Myrtle Beach, South Carolina	DC Diplomats THC	20-15	Georgia HC	Chicago Inter THC	21-20	New York City 2 THC	8
2018; Myrtle Beach, South Carolina	Los Angeles THC	34-31	Carolina Blue	New York City THC 2	31-28	Dallas THC	11
2019; Myrtle Beach, South Carolina	Alberta Team Handball	36-31 (o.t.)	Houston Firehawks	Miami Inter Handball	26-18	San Francisco CalHeat II	12
2020; Detroit, Michigan	cancelled			cancelled			0
2021	cancelled			cancelled			0
2022; Adrian, Michigan	Carolina Team Handball Club	25-17	San Francisco CalHeat II	New York City THC II	34-32	Minnesota Team Handball	8
2023; Spokane, Washington	California Eagles	31-28	San Francisco CalHeat II	Seattle Handball Club	26-24	Boston THC	10
2024; Spokane, Washington	California Eagles	29-23	New York City THC	Los Angeles THC	33-29	San Francisco CalHeat	6
2025; Bettendorf, Iowa	Prairie Selects	37-34	San Diego THC	New York Athletic Club II	31-20	Los Angeles THC	9
2026; Bettendorf, Iowa	Los Angeles THC II	32-23	New York Athletic Club Red	Boston THC	25-17	Minnesota Team Handball	11

=== Division II ===
Year	Final			Third-place match			Teams
Year	Champions	Score	Runners-up	3rd place	Score	4th place	Teams
1987	Badger THC						
1988	West Point						
1991; Oklahoma City, Oklahoma	West Point	17–16	Air Force	University of North Carolina	17–16	Ohio State	
1995; Atlanta, Georgia	All-Indian Team Handball						
2000; Tampa, Florida	Air Force Academy		USA Deaf	University of North Carolina at Chapel Alumni		West Point Gold	8
2001; Atlanta, Georgia	University of North Carolina at Chapel Alumni		Air Force Academy	Buchanan Indian Storm		Lander Alumni	6
2002; Nassau Community College, NY	Knight Air DOGs		MIT Lions	Los Angeles THC		Georgia Institute of Technology	10
2003; Reno, Nevada	Air Force Academy	21-20	Rock Handball	West Point Gold	22-16	ATH Red	8
2004; Houston, Texas	West Point Gold	18-14	Kansas	ATH Red	20-19	Colorado State University	5
2017; Myrtle Beach, South Carolina	New York City 3 THC	15-13	Boston THC	West Point Gold	21-20	University of Virginia	7
2022 Adrian, Michigan	HC Toronto	29-19	Fargo-Moorhead Wolves	DC Diplomats	24-23	Columbus Armada	6
2024; Spokane, Washington	Prairie Selects	29-19	San Francisco CalHeat II	California Ealges II	25-23	Alberta U21	9

== Individual awards ==
Year	Player	Team	Player	Team	Player	Team
Men's open division I
	MVP		MVG		Top Scorer	
2001	Richard Jacobs	USA Deaf	Ty Kovacs	USA Deaf		
2002	Josh Ehman	Air Force Academy	Italo Zanzi	Atlanta		
2003	Thomas Hedlund	Los Angeles THC	Thomas Sheppard	West Point Black		
2004	Ivan Paz	Houston Firehawks	Dave Schmitt	Air Force Academy		
2011	Bobby Dunn	New York Athletic Club	Danny Caparelli	New York Athletic Club		
2012	Divine Jackson	New York Athletic Club	Danny Caparelli	New York Athletic Club		
2013	Dennis Skarpeid Hermansen	Georgia HC	Thibault Salingue	New York City 2 THC		
2014	Sean Cahill	Air Force Academy	Forrest Keller	West Point Gold		
2015	Christopher Lindager	Houston Firehawks	Peter Acosta	Houston Firehawks		
2017	Adrien Frier	DC Diplomats	Christoph Schmid	DC Diplomats	Adrien Frier	DC Diplomats
2018	Roger Silva	Dallas THC	Michael Gordon	Long Island Tigers	Roger Silva	Dallas THC
2019	Mateusz Piec	Carolina Blue	Eliud Fonseca	Houston Firehawks	Alriel Briggs / Matt Grohs	Long Island Tigers / Saskatchewan Junior Men
2022	Aaron Hamm	Carolina THC	Jack Moore	Carolina THC	Paul Meisner	Minnesota Team Handball
2023	Robin Zoeller	California Eagles	Omar Bentahar	San Francisco CalHeat II	Kyle Colwell	Saskatchewan Juniors
2024	Maxime Bouschet	California Eagles	Mohsen B. Renani	Los Angeles THC	Nikolai Keller	Los Angeles THC
2025					Ruben Sanchez	San Diego THC
2026	Tim Bottinga	Los Angeles THC II	Vito Horvat	New York Athletic Club Red	Khalil Zbiss	Motor City HC
Men's open division II
	MVP		MVG		Top Scorer	
2001	Matt Johnson	University of North Carolina at Chapel Alumni	Chad Benesh	University of North Carolina at Chapel Alumni		
2002	Remo Ziegler	MIT Lions	Brian Beachkofski	KA DOGs		
2003	John Parker	Rock Handball	Brandon Strack	Rock Handball		
2004	Scott Pace	West Point Gold	Bjoern Meinhardt	Kansas		
2017	Daniel Suarez	Boston TH II	Kevin O’Connel	New York City 3 THC	Joseph Drennan	West Point Gold
2022	Alexis Renaud	HC Toronto	Julien Renaud	HC Toronto	Sean Starrett	Columbus Armada
2023
2024	Kyle Colwell	Prairie Selects	Matthew Styles	Prairie Selects	Arnau Rossell	San Diego THC

== Medal count ==
=== Men's open I medal count ===
Rank	Club	Gold	Silver	Bronze	Total
1	New York Athletic Club	9	3	4	16
2	San Francisco CalHeat	4	1	1	6
3	Adelphi University	4	0	0	4
4	Sushi Masters	2	4	3	9
5	Air Force Academy	2	1	3	6
6	Houston Firehawks TH	2	1	0	3
7	West Point	1	2	1	4
8	Ventura Condors	1	2	0	3
9	Swim & Sport Club of Flanders	1	1	4	6
10	New York City THC	1	1	1	3
11	Knight Magic	1	1	0	2
11	Los Angeles THC	1	1	0	2
13	Boston THC	1	0	1	2
13	Chicago Inter THC	1	0	1	2
13	Denver HC	1	0	1	2
13	New England Freeze	1	0	1	2
13	Northwest Suburban Chicago	1	0	1	2
18	Atlanta Condors	1	0	0	1
18	Atlanta THC	1	0	0	1
18	Chicago THC	1	0	0	1
18	DC Diplomats THC	1	0	0	1
18	Jersey Jets	1	0	0	1
18	Miami Storm	1	0	0	1
18	Rochester Sport Club	1	0	0	1
18	USA Deaf	1	0	0	1
18	University of California, LA	1	0	0	1
18	University of Utah	1	0	0	1
18	West Coast All-Stars	1	0	0	1
29	Georgia HC	0	5	1	6
30	United States Army	0	3	0	3
31	Carolina THC	0	1	1	2
31	Knight Air	0	1	1	2
33	Condor Old	0	1	0	1
33	LA Stars	0	1	0	1
33	Minnesota	0	1	0	1
33	Otra Vez	0	1	0	1
33	Vipers Cleveland TH	0	1	0	1
38	Seattle Handball Club	0	0	2	2
39	Atlanta Metro	0	0	1	1
39	Crachovia	0	0	1	1
39	PLS Firehawks	0	0	1	1
39	Rangers	0	0	1	1
39	Willamette University	0	0	1	1
Totals (43 entries)		45	33	32	110

=== Men's all-time medal count ===
Rank	Club	Gold	Silver	Bronze	Total
1	New York Athletic Club	21	5	8	34
2	New York City THC	8	7	4	19
3	San Francisco CalHeat	4	1	3	8
4	Sushi Masters	2	4	3	9
5	Atlanta Metro Condors	2	0	0	2
6	Condors	1	4	1	6
7	Los Angeles THC	1	2	0	3
7	Ventura Condors	1	2	0	3
9	Swim & Sport Club of Flanders	1	1	1	3
10	Air Force Academy	1	1	0	2
10	Knight Magic	1	1	0	2
12	Knight Air	1	0	1	2
12	Northwest Suburban Chicago	1	0	1	2
14	ATH	1	0	0	1
14	Chicago THC	1	0	0	1
14	Jersey Jets	1	0	0	1
14	Rochester Sport Club	1	0	0	1
14	University of California, LA	1	0	0	1
14	West Coast All-Stars	1	0	0	1
20	United States Army	0	2	0	2
21	West Point	0	1	3	4
22	Boston TH	0	1	1	2
22	Chicago Inter THC	0	1	1	2
22	United H.C.	0	1	1	2
25	Colorado Stars	0	1	0	1
25	Houston Firehawks TH	0	1	0	1
25	LA Stars	0	1	0	1
25	Miami Sharks	0	1	0	1
25	New England Freeze	0	1	0	1
25	Otra Vez	0	1	0	1
31	Carolina THC	0	0	1	1
31	Crachovia	0	0	1	1
31	DC Diplomats	0	0	1	1
31	Denver Wolves	0	0	1	1
31	Rangers	0	0	1	1
31	Willamette University	0	0	1	1
Totals (36 entries)		51	40	34	125

=== Men's open II medal count ===
Rank	Club	Gold	Silver	Bronze	Total
1	West Point	3	0	2	5
2	Air Force Academy	2	2	0	4
3	Carolina THC	1	0	2	3
4	All-Indian Team Handball	1	0	0	1
4	Badger THC	1	0	0	1
4	HC Toronto	1	0	0	1
4	Knight Air DOGs	1	0	0	1
4	New York City THC	1	0	0	1
4	Prairie Selects	1	0	0	1
10	Boston THC	0	1	0	1
10	Fargo-Moorhead Wolves	0	1	0	1
10	Kansas	0	1	0	1
10	MIT Lions	0	1	0	1
10	Rock Handball	0	1	0	1
10	San Francisco CalHeat	0	1	0	1
10	USA Deaf	0	1	0	1
17	ATH	0	0	1	1
17	Buchanan Indian Storm	0	0	1	1
17	California Eagles	0	0	1	1
17	DC Diplomats	0	0	1	1
17	Los Angeles THC	0	0	1	1
Totals (21 entries)		12	9	9	30
