= 2023 North American and Caribbean Senior Club Championship =

Tournament details
- Host country: Puerto Rico
- Venue(s): 1 (in 1 host city)
- Dates: 17 - 22 July 2023
- Teams: 4 (from 1 confederation)

Final positions
- Champions: (United States) San Francisco CalHeat (2nd title)
- Runner-up: (Puerto Rico) Caciques de Palmer
- Third place: (Puerto Rico) Academia de Balonmano de Río Grande Guerrilleros

Tournament statistics
- Matches played: 8
- Goals scored: 442 (55.25 per match)
- Attendance: 1,665 (208 per match)
- Top scorer(s): Pablo Rodriguez (Palmer); Jose Ceballos (Guerrilleros); Booth 30

Awards
- Best player: Pablo Rodriguez (Palmer)

The 2023 North American and Caribbean Senior Club Championship was the fourth edition of the North American and Caribbean Senior Club Championship which was a qualifying tournament for the 2023 IHF Men's Super Globe. It was held in Guaynabo, Puerto Rico from 17 to 22 July 2023.

== Teams ==
Following teams were qualified for the tournament.

Team	Qualified as
(United States) San Francisco CalHeat	Winner of USA Team Handball Nationals 2023
(Puerto Rico) Caciques de Palmer	Winner of Puerto rican Senior Men's Champion 2023
(Puerto Rico) Academia de Balonmano de Río Grande Guerrilleros	Runner-up of Puerto rican Senior Men's Champion 2023
(Mexico) Krakens Handball Club	Mexican representative

== Results ==
Pos	Team	Pld	W	D	L	GF	GA	GD	Pts	Qualification
1	(United States) San Francisco CalHeat	3	3	0	0	96	59	+37	6	Final
2	(Puerto Rico) Caciques de Palmer	3	1	0	2	76	84	−8	2 (Note: HTH: Palmer 2 Pts, +4 GD; Guerrilleros 2 Pts, −1 GD; Krakens 2 Pts, −3 GD)	Final
3	(Puerto Rico) Guerrilleros	3	1	0	2	71	84	−13	2	Third place game
4	(Mexico) Krakens Handball Club	3	1	0	2	66	82	−16	2	Third place game

Source: NACHC
Rules for classification: 1) points; 2) points in the games between teams in question; 3) goal difference in the games between teams in question; 4) number of goals scored in the games between teams in question; 5) goal difference; 6) number of goals scored.
Notes:

All times are local (UTC-4).

18 July 2023; 18:00	Guerrilleros (Puerto Rico)	24–26	(Mexico) Krakens Handball Club	Paraíso Recreacional Mario Jiménez, Guaynabo; Attendance: 200
18 July 2023; 18:00	Ceballos 8	(10–11)	Chaidez 7	Paraíso Recreacional Mario Jiménez, Guaynabo; Attendance: 200
18 July 2023; 18:00	5× (suspension)	Report	1× (suspension)	Paraíso Recreacional Mario Jiménez, Guaynabo; Attendance: 200

18 July 2023; 20:30	San Francisco CalHeat (United States)	34–22	(Puerto Rico) Caciques de Palmer	Paraíso Recreacional Mario Jiménez, Guaynabo; Attendance: 350
18 July 2023; 20:30	Kerst 7	(20–12)	Monge 9	Paraíso Recreacional Mario Jiménez, Guaynabo; Attendance: 350
18 July 2023; 20:30	6× (suspension)	Report	1× (yellow card) 2× (suspension)	Paraíso Recreacional Mario Jiménez, Guaynabo; Attendance: 350

19 July 2023; 18:00	San Francisco CalHeat (United States)	29–16	(Mexico) Krakens Handball Club	Paraíso Recreacional Mario Jiménez, Guaynabo; Attendance: 300
19 July 2023; 18:00	Kerst 5	(19–7)	Mondaca 4	Paraíso Recreacional Mario Jiménez, Guaynabo; Attendance: 300
19 July 2023; 18:00	1× (yellow card) 2× (suspension)	Report	1× (suspension) 1× (red card)	Paraíso Recreacional Mario Jiménez, Guaynabo; Attendance: 300

19 July 2023; 20:30	Caciques de Palmer (Puerto Rico)	25–26	(Puerto Rico) Guerrilleros	Paraíso Recreacional Mario Jiménez, Guaynabo; Attendance: 100
19 July 2023; 20:30	Rodriguez 10	(10–10)	3 players 6	Paraíso Recreacional Mario Jiménez, Guaynabo; Attendance: 100
19 July 2023; 20:30	3× (suspension)	Report	2× (yellow card) 5× (suspension)	Paraíso Recreacional Mario Jiménez, Guaynabo; Attendance: 100

21 July 2023; 18:00	Guerrilleros (Puerto Rico)	21–33	(United States) San Francisco CalHeat	Paraíso Recreacional Mario Jiménez, Guaynabo; Attendance: 150
21 July 2023; 18:00	Ceballos 8	(7–20)	Kerst 7	Paraíso Recreacional Mario Jiménez, Guaynabo; Attendance: 150
21 July 2023; 18:00	1× (yellow card) 3× (suspension) 1×	Report	1× (yellow card) 5× (suspension)	Paraíso Recreacional Mario Jiménez, Guaynabo; Attendance: 150

21 July 2023; 20:30	Krakens Handball Club (Mexico)	24–29	(Puerto Rico) Caciques de Palmer	Paraíso Recreacional Mario Jiménez, Guaynabo; Attendance: 350
21 July 2023; 20:30	Chaidez 7	(11–14)	Rodriguez 10	Paraíso Recreacional Mario Jiménez, Guaynabo; Attendance: 350
21 July 2023; 20:30	3× (suspension)	Report	1× (suspension)	Paraíso Recreacional Mario Jiménez, Guaynabo; Attendance: 350

== Third place game ==
22 July 2023; 16:00	Guerrilleros (Puerto Rico)	42–31	(Mexico) Krakens Handball Club	Paraíso Recreacional Mario Jiménez, Guaynabo; Attendance: 100
22 July 2023; 16:00	Ceballos 10	(24–10)	Ochoa 13	Paraíso Recreacional Mario Jiménez, Guaynabo; Attendance: 100
22 July 2023; 16:00	3× (suspension)	Report	4× (suspension)	Paraíso Recreacional Mario Jiménez, Guaynabo; Attendance: 100

== Final ==
22 July 2023; 19:00	San Francisco CalHeat (United States)	33–27	(Puerto Rico) Caciques de Palmer	Paraíso Recreacional Mario Jiménez, Guaynabo; Attendance: 115
22 July 2023; 19:00	Kerst 8	(18–14)	Monge 11	Paraíso Recreacional Mario Jiménez, Guaynabo; Attendance: 115
22 July 2023; 19:00	6× (suspension)	Report	2× (suspension)	Paraíso Recreacional Mario Jiménez, Guaynabo; Attendance: 115

== Final standing ==
Rank	Team
1st place, gold medalist(s)	(United States) San Francisco CalHeat
2nd place, silver medalist(s)	(Puerto Rico) Caciques de Palmer
3rd place, bronze medalist(s)	(Puerto Rico) Los Guerrilleros
4	(Mexico) Krakens Handball Club

Team qualified to the 2023 IHF Men's Super Globe

2023 North American and Caribbean Senior Club Champions

San Francisco CalHeat
Second title

Team roster: Lucas Kröger, Jonathan Garcia, Mikio Tada, Yannik Te Morsche, Mohamed Balti, Eloy Rubio, Maximilian Paulus, Paul Assfalg, Andrew Donlin, Daniel Eggert, Ole Olsen, Felix Kerst, Hjalte Clausen, Drew Bradley, Kasper Ogendahl & Zuwed Akuro
Head coach: Danilo Rojevic, Assistant coaches: Kristina Alavanja & Angel Mateo.

== Statistics ==
=== Top Scorers ===
#	Player	Team	G	⌀
1.	(Puerto Rico) Pablo Rodriguez	(Puerto Rico) Caciques de Palmer	30	7.50
1.	(Puerto Rico) Jose Ceballos	(Puerto Rico) Guerrilleros	30	7.50
3.	(Puerto Rico) Pablo Monge	(Puerto Rico) Caciques de Palmer	29	7.25
4.	(Germany) Felix Kerst	(United States) San Francisco CalHeat	27	6.75
5.	(Mexico) Benjamin Chaidez	(Mexico) Krakens Handball Club	20	5.00
5.	(Puerto Rico) Santos Ramos	(Puerto Rico) Guerrilleros	20	5.00
7.	(Mexico) Jesus Ochoa	(Mexico) Krakens Handball Club	18	4.50
8.	(Mexico) Luis Ramirez	(Mexico) Krakens Handball Club	15	3.75
9.	(Puerto Rico) Yadnier Nieves	(Puerto Rico) Caciques de Palmer	14	3.50
9.	(Mexico) Heriberto Mondaca	(Mexico) Krakens Handball Club	14	3.50
9.	(Puerto Rico) Hector Santana	(Puerto Rico) Guerrilleros	14	3.50
9.	(Cameroon) Zuwed Akuro	(United States) San Francisco CalHeat	14	3.50

=== All-Star team ===
Position	Player	Team
Most valuable player	(Puerto Rico) Pablo Rodriguez	(Puerto Rico) Caciques de Palmer
Goalkeeper	(Germany) Lucas Kröger	(United States) San Francisco CalHeat
Right wing	(Puerto Rico) Jose Ceballos	(Puerto Rico) Guerrilleros
Right back	(Denmark) Daniel Eggert	(United States) San Francisco CalHeat
Centre back	(Spain) Eloy Rubio	(United States) San Francisco CalHeat
Left back	(Cameroon) Zuwed Akuro	(United States) San Francisco CalHeat
Left wing	(Mexico) Benjamin Chaidez	(Mexico) Krakens Handball Club
Pivot	(United States) Drew Donlin	(United States) San Francisco CalHeat

== Official website ==
Official website
