= Lengerich =

Lengerich can refer to two municipalities in Germany:

- Lengerich, Westphalia, in the Steinfurt district, North Rhine-Westphalia
- Lengerich, Emsland, in the Emsland district, Lower Saxony
- Lengerich (Samtgemeinde), a collective municipality in Emsland, Lower Saxony
