= Ephrahim Jerry =

Dutch handball player (born 1996)

Personal information
- Nationality: Dutch
- Born: 27 May 1996 (age 30) Geldrop, Netherlands
- Height: 1.96 m (6 ft 5 in)

Sport
- Sport: Handball
- Position: Left back
- Current club: Sporting NeLo
- Number: 10
National team
Years	Team	Apps	(Gls)
–	Netherlands	35	(86)

Ephrahim Jerry (born 27 May 1996) is a Dutch handball player for Sporting NeLo and the Dutch national team.

He represented the Netherlands at the 2020 European Men's Handball Championship.
