= USA Team Handball Nationals =

US athletic tournament

College Nationals
- USA Team Handball Nationals Logo

Tournament information
- Sport: Handball
- Month played: May
- Established: 1968
- Format: Round Robin, Knockout Stage

Current champion
- Men's Elite: San Francisco CalHeat; Men's Open: Alberta Team Handball; Women's Open: New York City THC

The National is a team handball tournament to determine the Men's and Women's National Champion from the United States. On the men's side, there exist an Elite and Open Division. In years with many teams, the Open Division is split into Division I and II.

== History ==
The record champion on the men's side is the New York Athletic Club with a total of 20 titles. Since the Men's Elite Division was established, New York City THC holds the most titles (8), followed by New York Athletic Club (7). The current US men's reigning champion is San Francisco CalHeat. On the women's side, Chicago Inter HC holds 6 titles. The current US women's reigning champion is New York City THC.

== Men's ==
Until 2000 the Open Division was the tournament to select the national champion. After the Elite Division was established. The overall record champion is the New York Athletic Club with 20 titles.

=== Men's Elite Division ===
Record champion is New York City THC with 7 titles each.

=== Men's Open Division I ===
Record champion is the New York Athletic Club with, at minimum, 8 titles; the club has also the most repeat titles—3 titles.

=== Men's Open Division II ===
Record champions are the Air Force Falcons and West Point each with 2 titles.

== Women's Open Division ==
Record champion is the Chicago Inter HC with 6 titles the club has also the most continues titles with three.

== Medal count ==
=== Men's medal count ===
Rank	Club	Gold	Silver	Bronze	Total
1	New York Athletic Club	20	5	8	33
2	New York City THC	7	2	3	12
3	San Francisco CalHeat	4	1	3	8
4	Sushi Masters	2	4	3	9
5	Atlanta Metro Condors	2	0	0	2
6	Condors	1	4	1	6
7	Los Angeles THC	1	2	0	3
7	Ventura Condors	1	2	0	3
9	Swim & Sport Club of Flanders	1	1	1	3
10	Air Force Academy	1	1	0	2
10	Knight Magic	1	1	0	2
12	Knight Air	1	0	1	2
12	Northwest Suburban Chicago	1	0	1	2
14	ATH	1	0	0	1
14	Chicago THC	1	0	0	1
14	Jersey Jets	1	0	0	1
14	Rochester Sport Club	1	0	0	1
14	University of California, LA	1	0	0	1
14	West Coast All-Stars	1	0	0	1
20	United States Army	0	2	0	2
21	West Point	0	1	3	4
22	Boston TH	0	1	1	2
22	Chicago Inter THC	0	1	1	2
22	United H.C.	0	1	1	2
25	Colorado Stars	0	1	0	1
25	Houston Firehawks TH	0	1	0	1
25	LA Stars	0	1	0	1
25	Miami Sharks	0	1	0	1
25	New England Freeze	0	1	0	1
25	Otra Vez	0	1	0	1
31	Carolina THC	0	0	1	1
31	Crachovia	0	0	1	1
31	Denver Wolves	0	0	1	1
31	Rangers	0	0	1	1
31	Willamette University	0	0	1	1
Totals (35 entries)		49	35	32	116

=== Women's medal count ===
Rank	Club	Gold	Silver	Bronze	Total
1	Chicago Inter HC	6	5	2	13
2	New York City THC	3	8	3	14
3	San Francisco CalHeat	3	4	2	9
4	Antique Gold	3	0	0	3
5	Supercade GT	2	1	1	4
6	DC Diplomats THC	2	0	1	3
7	Colorado Springs Stars	2	0	0	2
7	Team Rogue	2	0	0	2
9	Québec	1	1	3	5
10	Dynamo HC	1	1	1	3
11	Kansas State University	1	1	0	2
11	Ohio State University	1	1	0	2
11	University of Minnesota	1	1	0	2
14	Alberta	1	0	1	2
14	Houston Firehawks TH	1	0	1	2
16	California West	1	0	0	1
16	East Coast HC	1	0	0	1
16	G and D Leisure	1	0	0	1
16	New England	1	0	0	1
16	Odenwald	1	0	0	1
16	P.A. Par	1	0	0	1
16	Panters	1	0	0	1
23	Cortland State	0	2	0	2
24	Carolina THC	0	1	3	4
25	Atlanta Storm	0	1	1	2
25	Lady Condors / Atlanta Condors	0	1	1	2
27	Rock Handball	0	1	0	1
28	West Point	0	0	3	3
29	Slippery Rock University of Pennsylvania	0	0	2	2
30	Apex-Irvine	0	0	1	1
30	Denver HC	0	0	1	1
30	Phoenix THC	0	0	1	1
30	Virginia Commonwealth University	0	0	1	1
Totals (33 entries)		37	29	29	95

=== Total medal count ===
Rank	Club	Gold	Silver	Bronze	Total
1	New York Athletic Club	20	4	8	32
2	San Francisco CalHeat	6	5	5	16
3	Chicago Inter HC	6	5	1	12
4	New York City THC	6	2	3	11
5	Antique Gold	3	0	0	3
6	Sushi Masters	2	4	3	9
7	Atlanta Metro Condors	2	0	0	2
7	DC Diplomats THC	2	0	0	2
9	Condors	1	4	1	6
10	Los Angeles THC	1	2	0	3
10	Ventura Condors	1	2	0	3
12	Dynamo HC	1	1	1	3
12	Houston Firehawks TH	1	1	1	3
12	Swim & Sport Club of Flanders	1	1	1	3
15	Air Force Academy	1	1	0	2
15	Knight Magic	1	1	0	2
15	Ohio State University	1	1	0	2
18	Knight Air	1	0	1	2
18	Northwest Suburban Chicago	1	0	1	2
20	ATH	1	0	0	1
20	California West	1	0	0	1
20	Chicago THC	1	0	0	1
20	Colorado Springs Stars	1	0	0	1
20	East Coast HC	1	0	0	1
20	G and D Leisure	1	0	0	1
20	Jersey Jets	1	0	0	1
20	Kansas State University	1	0	0	1
20	New England	1	0	0	1
20	Odenwald	1	0	0	1
20	P.A. Par	1	0	0	1
20	Panters	1	0	0	1
20	Rochester Sport Club	1	0	0	1
20	Supercade	1	0	0	1
20	University of California, LA	1	0	0	1
20	University of Minnesota	1	0	0	1
20	West Coast All-Stars	1	0	0	1
Totals (36 entries)		75	34	26	135
