= New York City THC =

Handball club from New York, United States

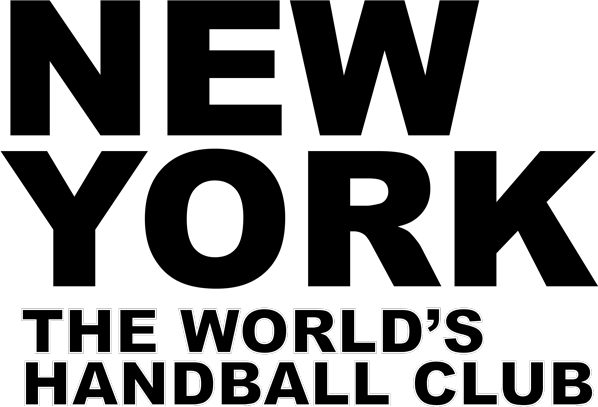
- Full name: New York City Team Handball Club
- Nickname: The World's Handball Club
- Short name: New York City, NYC THC
- Founded: 1973; 53 years ago
- President: Shkumbin 'Bini' Mustafa
- Head coach: Richard Kluz
- Captain: Ivan Ignjatovic
- League: Northeast Team Handball League D1, D2, WD
- 2022/23: D1 MEN: 1st WD: 1st
- Club colours
Home	Away

Location of New York City THC

New York City THC is a handball club from New York City.

== History ==
The club was found 1973 by United Nations employees.

== Accomplishments ==
=== International ===
- Gold : 2019 North American and Caribbean Senior Club Championship
- Bronze : 2021 North American and Caribbean Senior Club Championship
- Silver : 2024 North American and Caribbean Senior Club Championship
- 9th : 2019 IHF Super Globe
- 8th : 2019 IHF Women's Super Globe

=== National ===
- USA Team Handball Nationals
  - Men's Elite Division
    - Gold : 2007, 2009, 2011, 2012, 2015, 2017, 2018, 2025
    - Silver : 2013, 2016, 2019, 2023, 2024, 2026
    - Bronze : 2004, 2005, 2010, 2022
  - Men's Open Division I
    - Gold : 2000
    - Silver : 2013, 2018
    - Bronze : 2017
  - Men's Open Division II
    - Gold : 2017
  - Women's Open Division
    - Gold : 2019, 2024, 2025
    - Silver : 1989, 2001, 2002, 2011, 2015, 2017, 2018, 2023
    - Bronze : 2000, 2012, 2016
- Canadian Nationals
  - Men's
    - Gold : 2014
- International Copper Box
  - Men's
    - Gold : 1-time
- Pan American Men's Club Handball Championship
  - 5th place : 2016
- Northeast Team Handball League
  - Division 1 (Men)
    - Gold : 2009-10, 2010–11, 2011–12, 2012–13, 2013–14, 2014–15, 2015–16, 2016–17, 2017–18, 2018–19, 2019–20, 2021–22, 2022–23, 2023–24, 2024–25
  - Division 2 (Men)
    - Gold : 2012-13, 2017–18
    - Silver : 2016-17
    - Bronze : 2014-15
  - Women's Division
    - Gold : 2011-12, 2012–13, 2013–14, 2015–16, 2016–17, 2017–18, 2018–19, 2021–22, 2022–23, 2023–24, 2024–25
    - Silver : 2014-15

== Roster ==
=== Men's team ===
New York City THC Men's roster
Players
Coaches

#	Nat	Name	Pos	H	Height	Weight	DOB (YYYY–MM–DD)	From	Birthplace
1	(United States)	Ignjatovic, Ivan			192 cm (6 ft 3 1/2 in)	102 kg (225 lb)	1981-09-10
2	(France)	Coudrette, Pierre-Yves			180 cm (5 ft 10 3/4 in)	78 kg (172 lb)	1986-02-05
3	(Spain)	Prieto, Carlos			203 cm (6 ft 8 in)	105 kg (231 lb)	1980-02-02
4	(Belgium)	Soccal, Benjamin			188 cm (6 ft 2 in)	90 kg (198 lb)	1986-09-19
7	(Tunisia)	Boubaker, Hédi			185 cm (6 ft 3/4 in)	85 kg (187 lb)	1989-03-31
8	(United States)	Swieca, Pawel			192 cm (6 ft 3 1/2 in)	100 kg (220 lb)	1985-05-23
9	(France)	Kermel, Morgan			188 cm (6 ft 2 in)	96 kg (212 lb)	1985-09-14
10	(Brazil)	Pires, Gil			195 cm (6 ft 4 3/4 in)	105 kg (231 lb)	1982-01-20
12	(Brazil)	Justimiano, Jackson Jonas			184 cm (6 ft 1/2 in)	85 kg (187 lb)	1989-08-29
13	(France)	Benjamin Briffe			198 cm (6 ft 6 in)	105 kg (231 lb)	1987-02-01
15	(United States)	Radovanovic, Djordje			186 cm (6 ft 1 1/4 in)	85 kg (187 lb)	1983-08-21
17	(United States)	Shalaby Elsayed, Sayed Anwar			187 cm (6 ft 1 1/2 in)	87 kg (192 lb)	1975-07-01
19	(Brazil)	Seidel, Anderson			191 cm (6 ft 3 1/4 in)	100 kg (220 lb)	1981-01-19
23	(United States)	Mustafa, Shkumbin			186 cm (6 ft 1 1/4 in)	100 kg (220 lb)	1976-12-20
20	(Germany)	Lang, Stefan			186 cm (6 ft 1 1/4 in)	89 kg (196 lb)	1995-09-14
50	(Romania)	Oancea, Vlad			180 cm (5 ft 10 3/4 in)	90 kg (198 lb)	1976-11-20

Head coach

Richard Kluz

Assistant coach(es)

Mark Ortega
David Peele
Birane Diouf
Stevo Pepdjonovic

Legend

- (C) Team captain
- (DP) Unsigned draft pick
- (FA) Free agent
- (S) Suspended
- Injured

Roster
Last transaction: 2019-08-28

=== Women's team ===
New York City THC Women's roster
Players
Coaches

#	Nat	Name	Pos	H	Height	Weight	DOB (YYYY–MM–DD)	From	Birthplace
1	(Denmark)	Sorensen, Elisabeth Ouus	G		175 cm (5 ft 9 in)	77 kg (170 lb)	1991-03-21
2	(Denmark)	Michaelsen, Signe Fangel	LW		173 cm (5 ft 8 in)	67 kg (148 lb)	1986-03-18
3	(France)	Moyon, Sarah	P		171 cm (5 ft 7 1/4 in)	68 kg (150 lb)	1985-05-14
4	(Netherlands)	Hortensius, Sem Robin	LW		173 cm (5 ft 8 in)	63 kg (139 lb)	1999-07-05
5	(Denmark)	Engelstoft, Maja Storm	CB		168 cm (5 ft 6 1/4 in)	60 kg (132 lb)	1984-02-27
6	(Brazil)	Gamtis, Louise	B		168 cm (5 ft 6 1/4 in)	62 kg (137 lb)	1980-08-30
7	(Czech Republic)	Keslerová, Zuzana	B		175 cm (5 ft 9 in)	80 kg (176 lb)	1987-12-14
8	(Switzerland)	Moser, Helen Laura	B		180 cm (5 ft 10 3/4 in)	73 kg (161 lb)	1992-08-25
9	(Netherlands)	Khattab, Jasmien	B		170 cm (5 ft 7 in)	70 kg (154 lb)	1985-04-08
10	(Sweden)	Gustafsson, Elsa Helena	B		175 cm (5 ft 9 in)	70 kg (154 lb)	1979-03-22
11	(France)	Balanche, Cécile	B		174 cm (5 ft 8 1/2 in)	69 kg (152 lb)	1985-11-16
12	(Brazil)	Severiano, Daniela	G		166 cm (5 ft 5 1/4 in)	62 kg (137 lb)	1983-04-15
13	(Denmark)	Nielsen, Cecilie Maria	B		180 cm (5 ft 10 3/4 in)	70 kg (154 lb)	1991-02-21
14	(Denmark)	Nielsen, Maja Drud	B		174 cm (5 ft 8 1/2 in)	72 kg (159 lb)	1994-03-30

Head coach

Pierre-Yves Coudrette

Assistant coach(es)

Ivan Ignjatovic
Djordje Radovanovic
Joel Anabilah-Azumah
Anderson Seidel
Irene Chung-Ping Lee

Legend

- (C) Team captain
- (DP) Unsigned draft pick
- (FA) Free agent
- (S) Suspended
- Injured

Roster
Last transaction: 2019-07-31
