= Los Angeles THC =

Handball club

Los Angeles Handball Club
- Full name: Los Angeles Handball Club
- Short name: Los Angeles, LA, LAHC
- Founded: 2001; 25 years ago
- Head coach: Morten Olsen
- Club colours
Home	Away

Los Angeles Handball Club is a handball club from Los Angeles.

== History ==
The club was founded in 2001. In September 2025, American player and businessman Lewis Howes purchased the club. LAHC participated at the 2019 IHF North American and Caribbean Super Globe Qualifier. LAHC has its home court and training at the indoor practice grounds of MLS side Los Angeles Galaxy in Torrance, California. LAHC won the 2020 Valley of the Sun team handball tournament in Tempe, Arizona immediately before the COVID-19 pandemic. In November 2025 they hired former world champion Morten Olsen as their head coach. At the same time they signed former Austrian national team player Maximilian Hermann and Swedish former national team player Dalibor Doder. In 2026 they won the American Championship.

== Accomplishments ==
- USA Team Handball Nationals
  - Men's Elite Division
    - Gold : 2010
    - Silver : 2012, 2014
  - Men's Open Division I
    - Gold : 2018, 2026
    - Silver : 2003
  - Men's Open Division II
    - Bronze : 2002
- USA Team Handball National Cup
  - Gold : 2026
- North American and Caribbean Senior Club Championship
  - Gold : 2026

== Roster ==
roster
Players
Coaches

#	Nat	Name	Pos	H	Height	Weight	DOB (YYYY–MM–DD)	From	Birthplace
1		Williams, Joseph	G					Farmington Hills, Michigan
2		Hermann, Alexander	LB					Linz, Austria
3		Udo-Udoma, Ebiye Jeremy	CB					Portland, Oregon
4		Hermann, Maximilian	RB					Linz, Austria
5		Victorov, Yan	CB					Russia
6		Fuchs, Marcus	LB					Bielefeld, Germany
7		Wucherpfennig, Lukas	RW					Preetz, Germany
8		Garcia, Jacobo	LW					Los Angeles, California
10		Howes, Lewis	P					Columbus, Ohio
12		Hertlein, Felix	G
13		Akuro, Zuwed	LB					Phoenix, Arizona
15		Ritterbach, Joscha	LW					Lengerich, Germany
21		Marocchi, Grant	P					Huntington Beach, California
22		Velkavrh, Andraž	CB					Koper, Slovenia
34		Damgaard, Michael	CB					Rødby, Denmark
77		Clausen, Frederik	LB					Svendborg, Denmark

Head coach

Morten Olsen

Legend

- (C) Team captain
- (DP) Unsigned draft pick
- (FA) Free agent
- (S) Suspended
- Injured

Roster
Last transaction: 2026-07-14
