= Handball goalkeeper =

Team sport playing position

The handball goalkeeper is the most defensive player of their team. Their main task is to prevent the other team from scoring a goal.

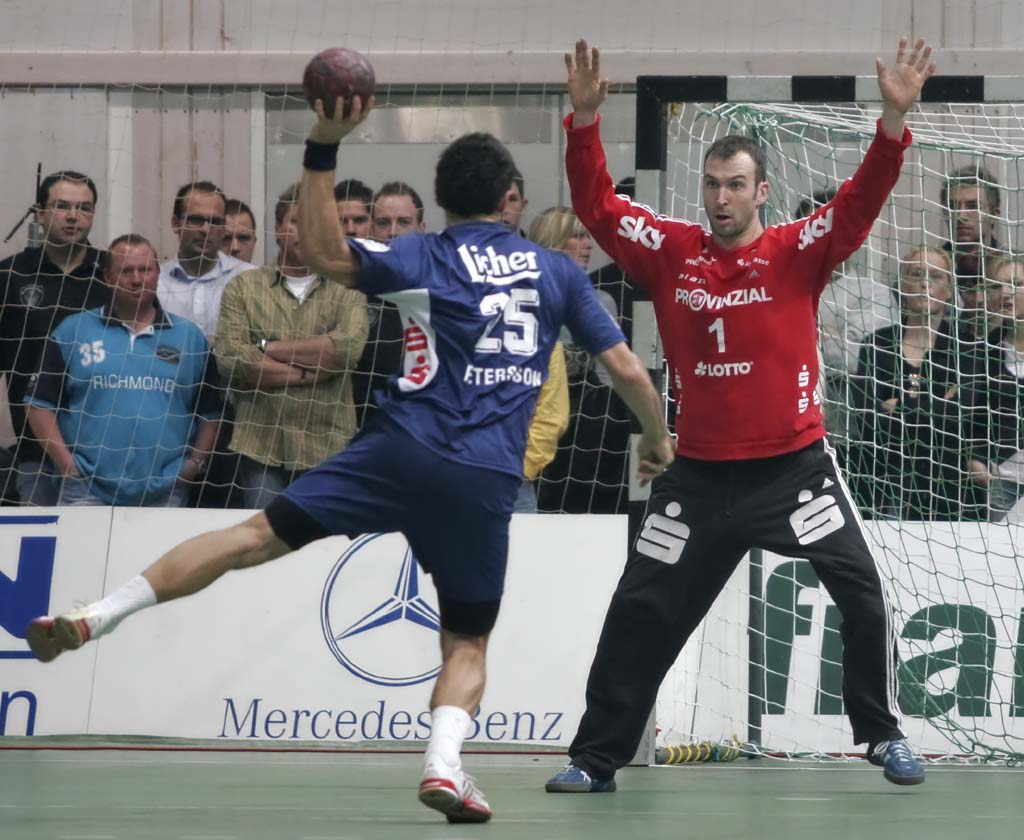
Thierry Omeyer during a seven-metre throw

== Equipment ==
To avoid confusion, a handball goalkeeper must wear a jersey that is different in colour to all the other jerseys of the players on the field, including the other team's goalkeeper. If such a jersey is not available the goalkeeper must wear a bib that guarantees sufficient distinction between players involved. Most goalkeepers also wear special long trousers and male goalkeepers always wear a jockstrap (an undergarment serving protection purposes). Rule 4:9 (concerning equipment during the game) states that it is mandatory for the players to wear sports shoes during the games. Unlike in football, handball goalkeepers do not wear gloves. Additional protective gear like face masks and helmets had been discussed in the early days of the game, but are now prohibited, as are any items that could endanger the opposing players including piercings, necklaces, earrings and glasses.

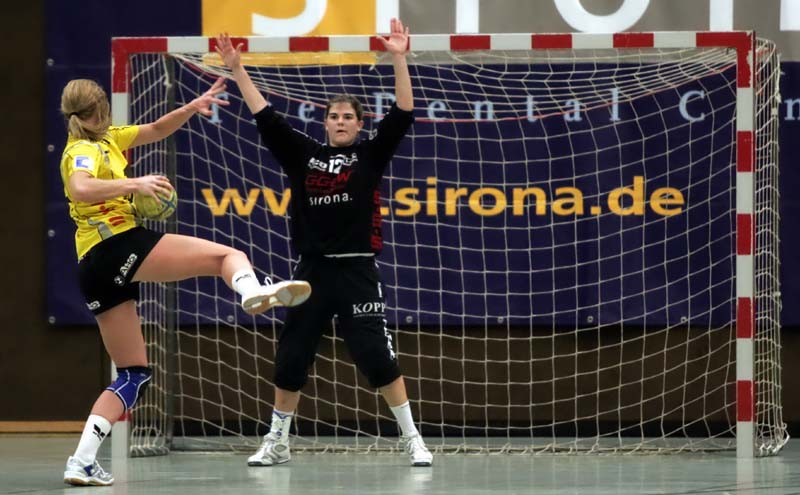
A woman goalkeeper during a seven-metre throw

== Rules for the goalkeeper ==
All rules can be found on the IHF website.

A team must appoint one player on the field as the goalie. However, a goalie can transition to a field player at any time during a game. In order to do this they need to be substituted and change their goalie jersey to a field player's jersey. A field player can assume the goalkeeper's position in the same manner. Rule 5 ''The Goalkeeper'' deals with all the rules pertaining to the goalie and a set of special rules about the goal area. Inside this area the goalkeeper is allowed to touch the ball with every part of their body in order to parry the ball. Additionally, several rules do not apply to the goalie inside the goal area. These rules are: the 3-second-rule (7:2), the 3-step-rule (7:3), the rule for bouncing the ball (7:4) and the multiple-touching-of-the-ball-rule (7:7). However, if the goalie purposefully delays playing the ball a referee can call passive gameplay.

The goalie is allowed to step out of the goal area and onto the playing field when not in possession of the ball at all times. While outside the goal area all rules pertaining to field players apply to them as well. Furthermore, they are allowed to step out of the goal area with the ball while he is still trying to get it under control (5:4). The goalkeeper is not allowed to leave the goal area with the ball under control if the referee has whistled for the execution of a goalkeeper-throw (5:6). This throw must be executed within the goal area. Rule 5:7+8 stipulate that while standing inside the goal area the goalkeeper is not allowed to touch a rolling or stationary ball outside the goal area. Moreover, they are not allowed to re-enter the goal area from the playing field with the ball (5:9). The goalie must not touch the ball with his foot or the leg below the knee if the ball is moving out towards the playing area (5:10). During a 7-metre throw from the opposing team the goalkeeper is not allowed to cross the goalkeeper's restraining line (4-metre-line) before the ball has left the hand of the opposing player executing the throw (5.11).

If the ball crosses the outer goal line outside the goalposts and the goalkeeper was the last player to touch the ball, the keeper gets the ball to execute a goalkeeper-throw inside the goal area. However, if the ball crosses the sideline the opposing team gets the ball for a throw-in.

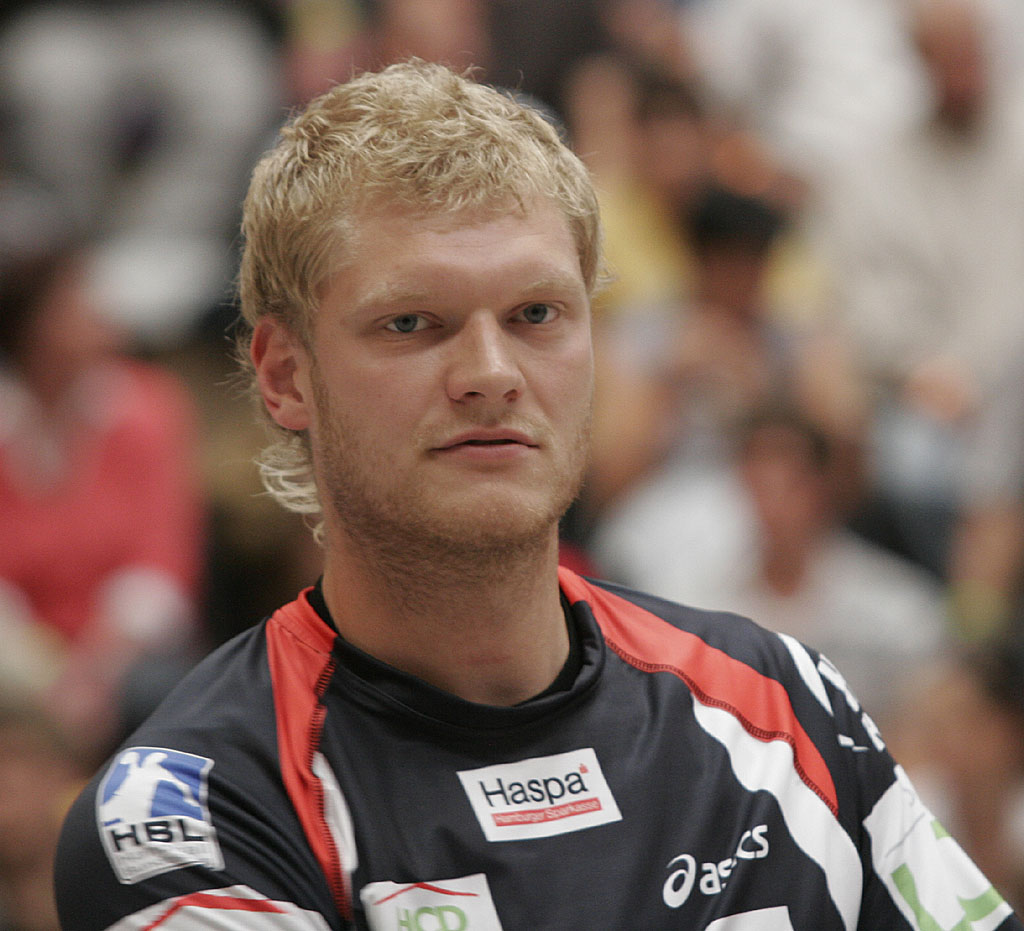
Johannes Bitter

Sometimes the goalkeeper will be used as a seventh field player or substituted by a regular field player. This normally happens during the last minutes of play if the score is a tie or the attacking team is down by just a few points. The extra player is added to increase the team's chances for a win or a tie.

== Duties and requirements of a handball goalkeeper ==
The goalkeeper's primary task is to prevent the other team from scoring a goal, which is achieved when the ball fully passes the goal line. The game has become much more fast-paced over the years which demands that the goalkeeper must bring the ball back into play very fast, leading to fast breaks or turnovers which provide very good scoring chances. Strategies like the second wave or the so-called schnelle Mitte, are fast-action plays intended to catch the opposing team off guard. After having conceded a goal the keeper passes the ball immediately to the centre of the court for a throw-off. In some situation the goalkeeper even scores a goal himself by taking advantage of the fact that the other team's goalie is too far away from his own goal and throwing the ball across the whole field into the empty goal. The German goalkeeper Johannes Bitter managed to score two goals in that manner over the course of his 112 international games.

Height is an important criterion for goalkeepers who want to play on a professional level. The rule of thumb in this regard is "the bigger the better". Dieter Bartke, a former goalkeeper of the German national league, was 2.16 m (7 ft 1 in) tall. Disadvantages in height are effectively compensated by other factors, like jumping power and flexibility of the body. Prominent examples are Wieland Schmidt (1.85 m [6 ft 1 in] tall) and Henning Fritz (1.88 m [6 ft 2 in]). Skills such as quick reflexes, quick comprehension and a distinct anticipation ability are considered more important than height. Modern handball training is focused on improving a goalkeeper's anticipation of typical in-game situations by implementing the so-called standard situation, a concept that simulates a set of the most common scenarios that can happen in a game. Sports scientists coined the phrase Aktionsmuster, action patterns, which goalkeepers try to embed in their subconsciousness.

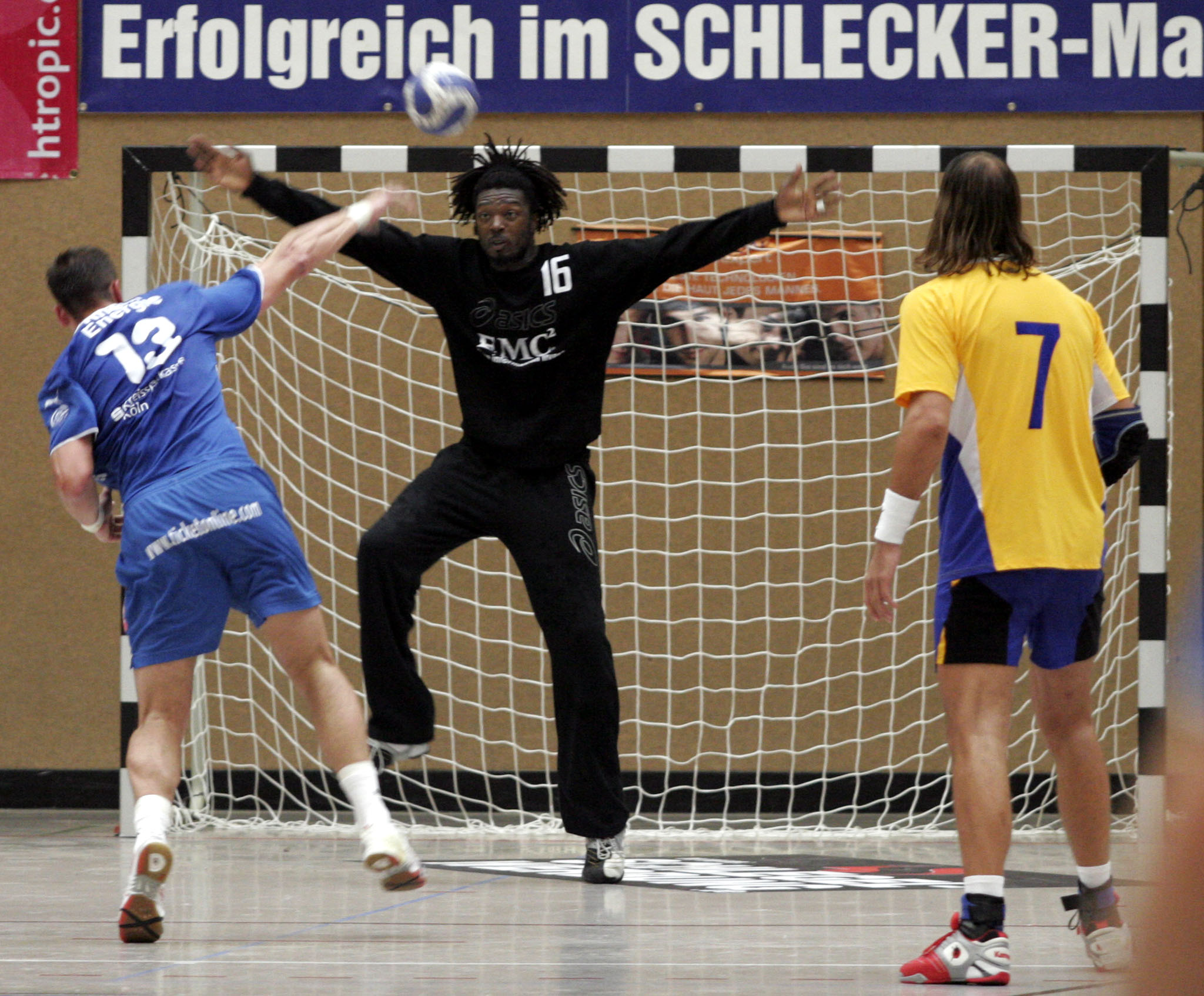
Daouda Karaboué

== Common goalkeeper injuries ==
Problems in the elbow area are most common among handball goalies. In 1992 a study conducted in Norway reported that 329 out of 729 (45%) handball goalkeepers suffered from pain in the elbow joint area. In contrast to these numbers only 166 out of 4120 (4%) field players complained about similar problems. In a follow-up survey out of these 729 goalkeepers 41% had acute problems and 34% reported past problems in the area. The health problem caused recurring pain and often the goalkeepers had to stop playing for several games due to injury. The apparent cause for these injuries is a repeated overextension of the elbow joint while trying to parry a ball. The authors of the study call the syndrome the handball goalie's elbow. This hyperextension trauma of the elbow can also frequently occur during joint-lock techniques in judo.

The cause for this type of pain is most probably damage to the ulnar nerve. A definite diagnosis is the main focus of current studies in order to develop sufficient prevention and treatment methods.

== Further remarks ==
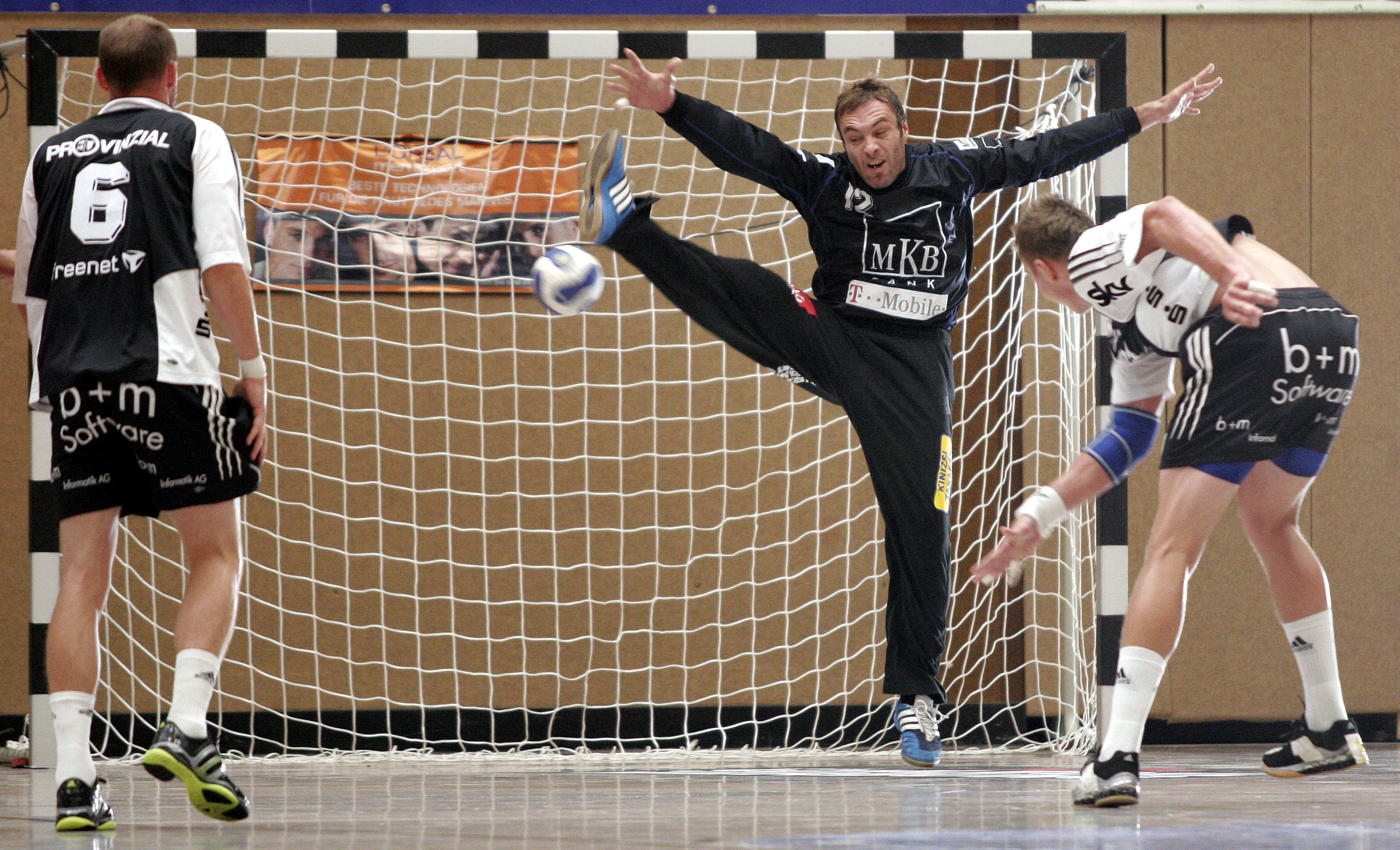
Dejan Perić

If a goalkeeper receives a two-minute suspension they must leave the field and is replaced by another goalkeeper, usually forcing his team to continue playing with one player less on the field. It has been under discussion for several years whether goalkeepers should be forbidden to step outside the goal area during fast breaks, a rule which has caused a lot of accidents between the goalie and field players.

If both teams have similar performance during a game, the goalkeeper's individual performance can have a huge impact on the outcome of the game. A ratio of 25 per cent saves and more is regarded a very good performance with 50 per cent saves very rarely being achieved over a time period of thirty minutes.

The jumping jack is a typical goalkeeper's defensive movement while trying to save the ball.

When a player's throw hits the goalkeeper's head, for example, from a seven-meter throw, the player will be disqualified (rule 8:5).

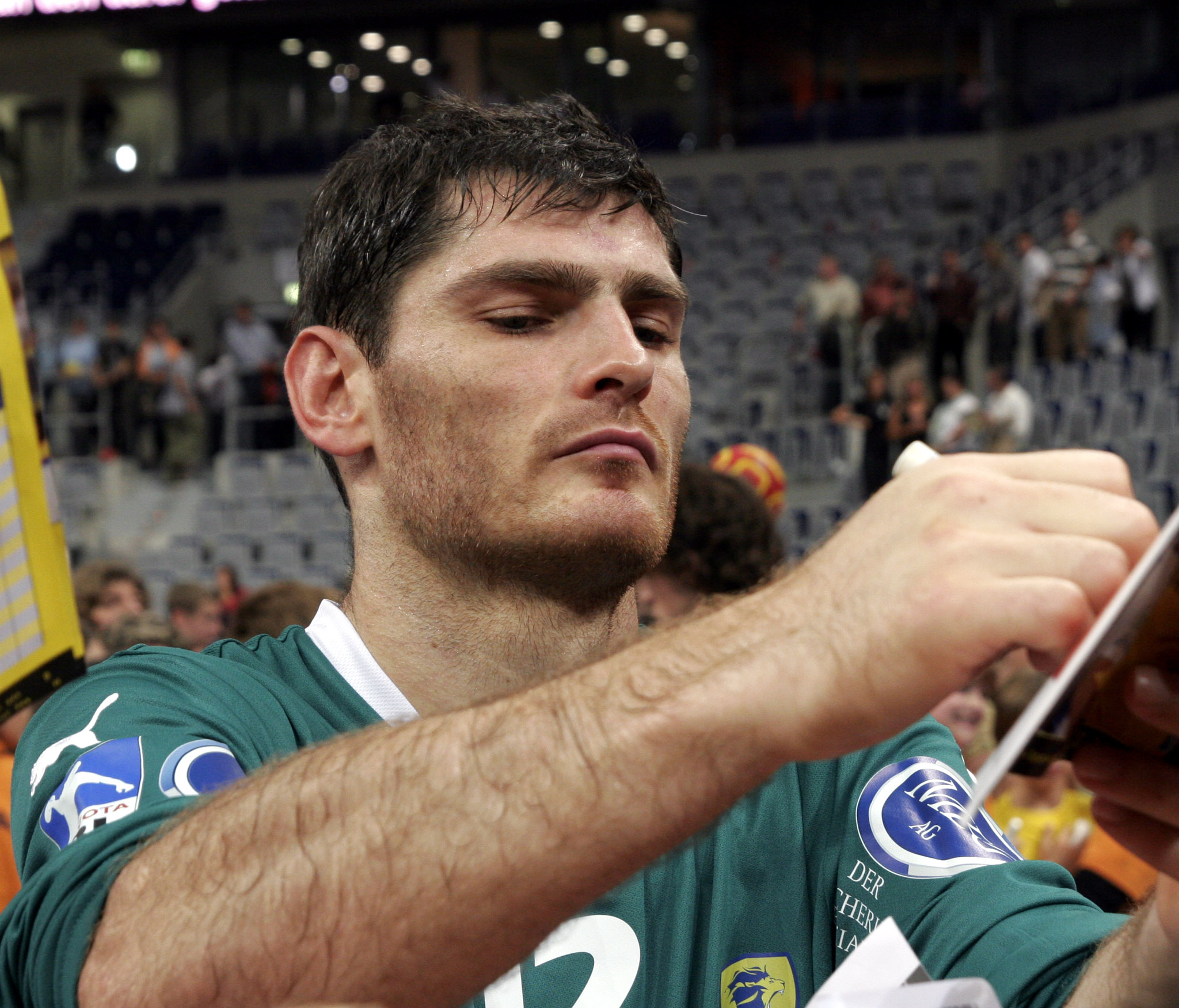
Henning Fritz

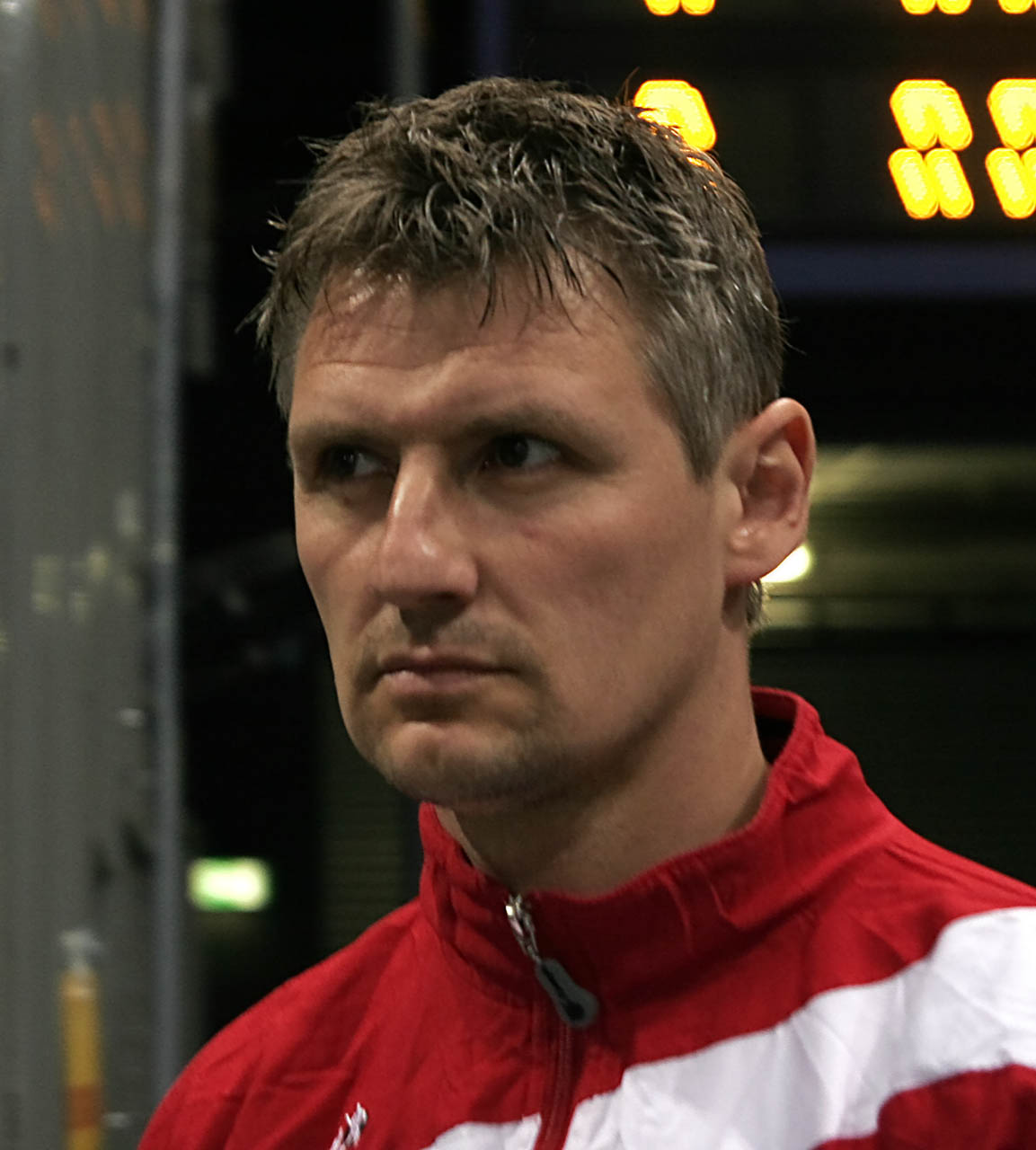
Peter Gentzel

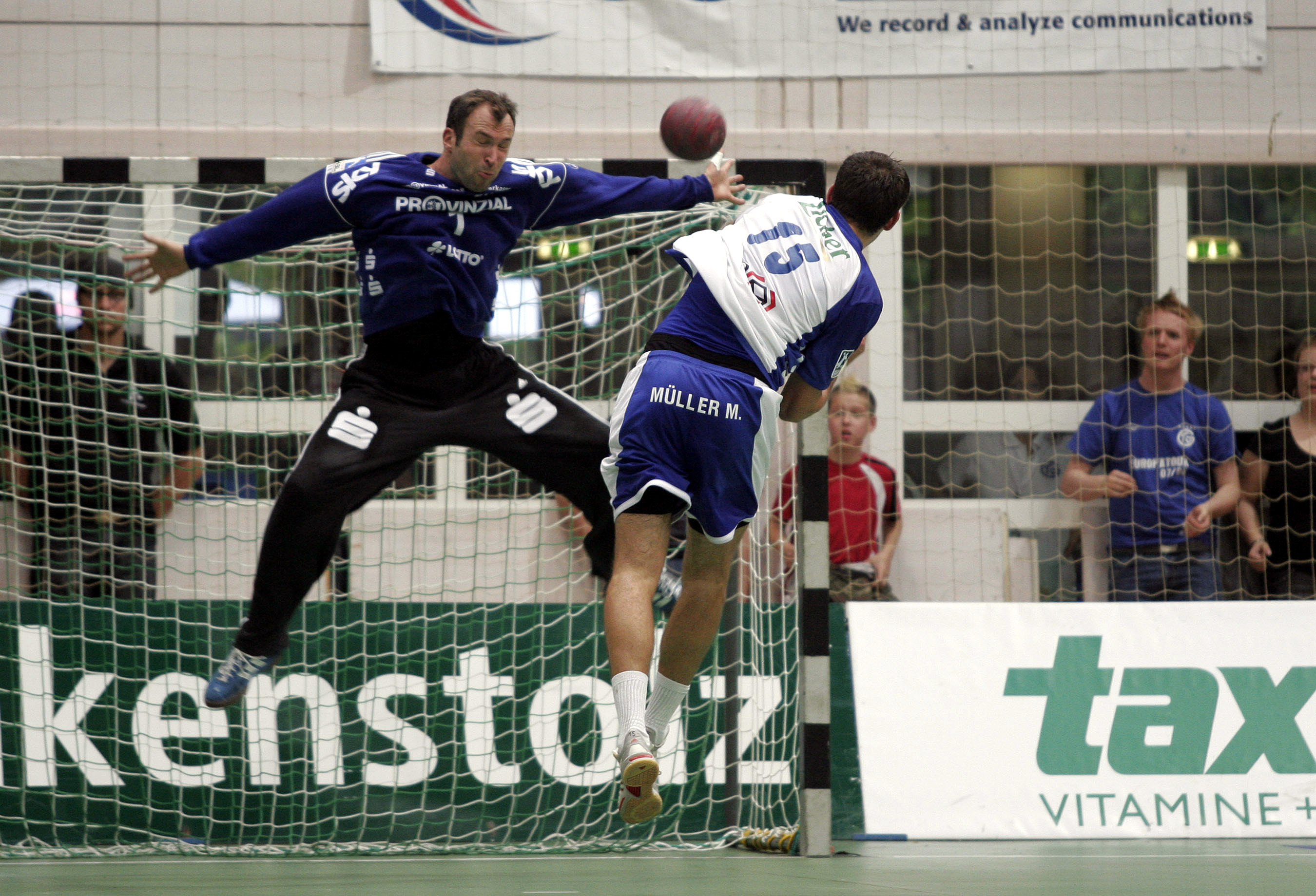
Thierry Omeyer performing the jumping jack

== Notable goalkeepers ==
Among the best male goalkeeper, one can mention (in alphabetical order)

- Mattias Andersson (several times German champion, European champion with Sweden in 2000, multiple time EHF Champions League winner)
- David Barrufet (seven times winner of the EHF Champions League (record))
- Mirko Bašić (Olympic champion in 1984 and World champion in 1986)
- Johannes Bitter (EHF Cup winner, World champion in 2007, German champion in 2011)
- Henning Fritz (World champion in 2007, IHF World Player of the Year in 2004)
- Peter Gentzel (213 international matches for Sweden, three times European champion, one time World champion)
- Niklas Landin Jacobsen (Three time world champion, IHF World Player of the Year in 2019 and 2021)
- Andrey Lavrov (three times Olympic champion, World champion and European champion)
- Thierry Omeyer (several times French and German champion, World champion in 2001, 2009 and 2011, European champion in 2006 and 2010, Olympic champion in 2008, World Player of the Year in 2008)
- Wieland Schmidt (Olympic champion in 1980 with the GDR team)
- Arpad Šterbik (World Player of the Year in 2005, several times Spanish and Hungarian champion)
- Tomas Svensson (six times winner of the EHF Champions LeagueGoalkeeper of EHF's Champions League Ultimate Selection in 2013)
- Sławomir Szmal (IHF World Player of the Year in 2009)
- Andreas Thiel (Nicknamed the magician, seven times German Player of the Year, five times German champion)
- Andreas Wolff (European champion with Germany in 2016)

Among the best female goalkeeper, one can mention (in alphabetical order)

- Luminița Dinu-Huțupan (voted as best female goalkeeper ever in 2011)
- Cecilie Leganger (World champion in 1999, World female player of the Year in 2001, 6 times best goalkeeper at an international tournament)
- Amandine Leynaud (Olympic champion in 2021, World champion in 2017 and European champion in 2018)
- Katrine Lunde (10 international titles including 6 times European champion, seven times winner of the EHF Champions League)
- Nataliya Matryuk (7 times winner of the European Champions Cup, World champion in 1982 and 1986)
- Nataliya Rusnachenko (9 times winner of the European Champions Cup/League, bronze medal at 1988 Olympics)
- Sandra Toft (IHF World Player of the Year 2021)
- Sean Dornan Tryst goalkeeper and founder member of the Pat Bonner Sondico goalkeeper club

== Literature ==
- A. Thiel u. a.: Halten wie wir. Philippka-Verlag, 1999, ISBN 3-89417-079-4.
- D. Späte u. a.: Handball Handbuch. Philippka Verlag, 1997, ISBN 3-89417-063-8.
- J. Schorer: Höchstleistung im Handballtor. Dissertation. Ruprecht-Karls-Universität, Heidelberg 2006.
