= USA Team Handball Nationals – men's elite division =

USA Team Handball Nationals - Men's Elite Division
Tournament information
- Sport: Handball
- Month played: April–May
- Established: 2000
- Format: Round Robin, Knockout Stage
- Teams: 9

Current champion
- New York Athletic Club

The Men's Elite Division is a team handball tournament to determine the U.S. National Champion. Only qualified teams are allowed to play in this division while teams who fail to qualify play in the Open Division. Automatic bids are given to the winners of the Northeast Team Handball League, Midwest Team Handball and, in the past, were also given to the Great Lakes Team Handball Association and Western Team Handball League. The current Elite Division format comprises 8 teams. Before the Elite Division was established, the National Champion was crowned in the Open Division.

In 2023/24, and in the absence of qualifying events, the Elite Division was not held and the US national champion was decided in the Open Division.

== Results ==
Year	Final			3rd place match			Teams
Year	Champions	Score	Runners-up	3rd place	Score	4th place	Teams
2000; Tampa, Florida	Condor South		Garden City (Note: New York Athletic Club played at the beginning with the name Garden City.)	Condor West		Knight Air	8
2001; Atlanta, Georgia	Garden City	20-14	Condors	San Francisco CalHeat	15-9	ATH	6
2002; Nassau Community College, NY	Knight Air		Condors	San Francisco CalHeat	24-21	Garden City	8
2003; Reno, Nevada	ATH Blue	26-20	Condors	Garden City	16-14	San Francisco CalHeat	7
2004; Houston, Texas	Atlanta Metro Condors	26-15	Garden City	New York City THC	32-29	San Francisco CalHeat	14
2005; Houston, Texas	Garden City		Condors	New York City THC		Los Angeles THC	12
2006; Houston, Texas	New York Athletic Club	18-16	Miami Sharks	Carolina THC	15-13	Condors	12
2007; University of Delaware, DE	New York City THC	38-27	West Point Black	New York Athletic Club		Chicago Inter Handball	8
2008; Newark, Delaware	cancelled			cancelled			0
2009; Elgin, Illinois	New York City THC	37-34	Houston Firehawks TH	New York Athletic Club	26-12	Los Angeles THC	20
2010; Las Vegas, Nevada	Los Angeles THC	25-20	New England Freeze	New York City THC		Houston Firehawks TH	8
2011; Salt Lake City, Utah	New York City THC	33-13	Chicago Inter Handball	Boston TH	32-30	West Point	10
2012; Minneapolis, Minnesota	New York City THC	25-20	Los Angeles THC	Chicago Inter Handball	21-20	Boston TH	8
2013; Reno, Nevada	New York Athletic Club	25-24	New York City THC	West Point Black	29-24	Los Angeles THC	7
2014; Reno, Nevada	New York Athletic Club	25-21	Los Angeles THC	West Point Black	37-32	Chicago Inter Handball	8
2015; York, Pennsylvania	New York City THC	26-13	Boston TH	New York Athletic Club	19-15	DC Diplomats THC	8
2016; York, Pennsylvania	New York Athletic Club	28-25	New York City THC	United H.C.		Boston THC	10
2017; Myrtle Beach, South Carolina	New York City THC	33-26	United H.C.	New York Athletic Club	23-20	Boston THC	8
2018; Myrtle Beach, South Carolina	New York City THC	31-18	San Francisco CalHeat	New York Athletic Club	34-25	Boston THC	8
2019; Myrtle Beach, South Carolina	San Francisco CalHeat	31-30	New York City THC	New York Athletic Club	32-30	Los Angeles THC	8
2020; Detroit, Michigan	cancelled			cancelled			0
2021; Detroit, Michigan	cancelled			cancelled			0
2022; Adrian, Michigan	San Francisco CalHeat	33-22	New York Athletic Club	New York City THC	32-28	Chicago Inter Handball	8
2023; Spokane, Washington	San Francisco CalHeat	34-30	New York City THC	New York Athletic Club	24-23	Chicago Inter Handball	7
2024; Spokane, Washington	No Elite division (replaced by Open D1)			No Elite division (replaced by Open D1)			0
2025; Bettendorf, Iowa	New York City THC	26–22	New York Athletic Club	Denver Wolves	30–29	San Francisco CalHeat	8
2026; Bettendorf, Iowa	New York Athletic Club	36–34 ^{OT}	New York City THC	DC Diplomats	33–25	San Francisco CalHeat	9

== Individual awards ==
Year	Player	Team	Player	Team	Player	Team
	MVP		MVG		Top Scorer	
2000	Mike Hurdle	Condor South	Manuel Poch	Condor South		
2001	Thomas Fitzgerald	Garden City	Dan Hennessey	Garden City		
2002	Jeff Kunard	Knight Air	Matt Van Houten	Knight Air		
2003	John Kelly	ATH Blue	Italo Zanzi	ATH Red		
2004	Gary Hines	Atlanta Metro Condors	Manuel Poch	Atlanta Metro Condors		
2006	Odael Marcos Puerta	Miami Sharks	Danny Caparelli	New York Athletic Club		
2007	Zoran Ostojic	New York City THC	Ivan Ignjatovic	New York City THC		
2008	cancelled		cancelled			
2009	Zoran Ostojic	New York City THC	Aleksandr Voronov	Houston Firehawks		
2011	Djordje Radovanovic	New York City THC	Ivan Ignjatovic	New York City THC		
2012	Sayed Shalaby	New York City THC	Ivan Ignjatovic	New York City THC		
2013	Djordje Radovanovic	New York City THC	Danny Caparelli	New York Athletic Club		
2014	Jordan Fithian	New York Athletic Club	Danny Caparelli	New York Athletic Club		
2015	Sayed Shalaby	New York City THC	Ivan Ignjatovic	New York City THC		
2016	Pär Möllerberg	New York Athletic Club	Danny Caparelli	New York Athletic Club		
2017	Sayed Shalaby	New York City THC	Ryan Homsy	New York City THC	Philip Altong	Houston Firehawks
2018	Djordje Radovanovic	New York City THC	Ivan Ignjatovic	New York City THC	Philip Altong	Houston Firehawks
2019	Gil Pires	Los Angeles THC	Lucas Kroeger	San Francisco CalHeat	Gil Pires	Los Angeles THC
	Dr. Peter Buehning MVP		Sandor Rivnyak MVG		Top Scorer	
2022	Ty Reed	New York Athletic Club	Lucas Kroeger	San Francisco CalHeat	Israel Bayardo	Los Angeles THC
2023	Kylian Prat	New York City THC	Lucas Kroeger	San Francisco CalHeat	Robero Alcaraz	Denver Wolves
2025					Algot Hane	San Francisco CalHeat
2026	Sigurt Leth Klinge	New York Athletic Club	Justin Justimiano	New York City THC	Sigurt Leth Klinge	New York Athletic Club

== Medal count ==
=== Men's Elite Medal count ===
Rank	Club	Gold	Silver	Bronze	Total
1	Garden City / New York Athletic Club	8	4	8	20
2	New York City THC	7	5	4	16
3	San Francisco CalHeat	3	1	2	6
4	Condors	2	4	1	7
5	Los Angeles THC	1	2	0	3
6	ATH Blue	1	0	0	1
6	Knight Air	1	0	0	1
8	West Point	0	1	2	3
9	Boston THC	0	1	1	2
9	Chicago Inter THC	0	1	1	2
9	United H.C.	0	1	1	2
12	Houston Firehawks TH	0	1	0	1
12	Miami Sharks	0	1	0	1
12	New England Freeze	0	1	0	1
15	Carolina THC	0	0	1	1
15	DC Diplomats	0	0	1	1
15	Denver Wolves	0	0	1	1
Totals (17 entries)		23	23	23	69

=== Men's All time Medal count ===
Rank	Club	Gold	Silver	Bronze	Total
1	New York Athletic Club	20	5	8	33
2	New York City THC	8	6	4	18
3	San Francisco CalHeat	4	1	3	8
4	Sushi Masters	2	4	3	9
5	Atlanta Metro Condors	2	0	0	2
6	Condors	1	4	1	6
7	Los Angeles THC	1	2	0	3
7	Ventura Condors	1	2	0	3
9	Swim & Sport Club of Flanders	1	1	1	3
10	Air Force Academy	1	1	0	2
10	Knight Magic	1	1	0	2
12	Knight Air	1	0	1	2
12	Northwest Suburban Chicago	1	0	1	2
14	ATH	1	0	0	1
14	Chicago THC	1	0	0	1
14	Jersey Jets	1	0	0	1
14	Rochester Sport Club	1	0	0	1
14	University of California, LA	1	0	0	1
14	West Coast All-Stars	1	0	0	1
20	United States Army	0	2	0	2
21	West Point	0	1	3	4
22	Boston TH	0	1	1	2
22	Chicago Inter THC	0	1	1	2
22	United H.C.	0	1	1	2
25	Colorado Stars	0	1	0	1
25	Houston Firehawks TH	0	1	0	1
25	LA Stars	0	1	0	1
25	Miami Sharks	0	1	0	1
25	New England Freeze	0	1	0	1
25	Otra Vez	0	1	0	1
31	Carolina THC	0	0	1	1
31	Crachovia	0	0	1	1
31	Denver Wolves	0	0	1	1
31	Rangers	0	0	1	1
31	Willamette University	0	0	1	1
Totals (35 entries)		50	39	33	122
