= 2014 Greenlandic Football Championship =

2014 Coca Cola GM
- Season: 2014
- Champions: B-67 Nuuk (10th title)

The 2014 Coca-Cola GM was the 44th edition of the Greenlandic Men's Football Championship. The final round was held in Nuuk from 4 to 9 August. It was won by B-67 Nuuk for the third consecutive time and for the tenth time in its history.

== Qualifying stage ==
=== North Greenland ===
All matches were played in Uummannaq.

Pos	Team	Pld	W	D	L	GF	GA	GD	Pts	Qualification or relegation
1	FC Malamuk	4	4	0	0	-	-	—	12	2014 Coca Cola GM Final Round
2	Kingmeq-45	3	2	0	1	-	-	—	6	
3	Eqaluk-56	2	1	0	1	-	-	—	3	
4	Umanak BK 68	3	1	0	2	-	-	—	3	
5	Upernavik BK 83	4	0	0	4	-	-	—	0	

^{NB} Some match results are unavailable.

=== Disko Bay ===
All matches were played in Qeqertarsuaq.

Pos	Team	Pld	W	D	L	GF	GA	GD	Pts	Qualification or relegation
1	Nagdlunguaq-48	4	3	1	0	22	2	+20	10	2014 Coca Cola GM Final Round
2	G-44 Qeqertarsuaq	4	3	1	0	13	1	+12	10	2014 Coca Cola GM Final Round
3	Kugsak-45	4	2	0	2	10	8	+2	6	
4	Tupilak-41	4	0	1	3	2	15	−13	1	
5	Ilulissat-69	4	0	1	3	1	22	−21	1	

=== Central Greenland ===
All matches were played in Maniitsoq.

Pos	Team	Pld	W	D	L	GF	GA	GD	Pts	Qualification or relegation
1	B-67 Nuuk	3	3	0	0	23	2	+21	9	2014 Coca Cola GM Final Round
2	Inuit Timersoqatigiiffiat-79	3	2	0	1	8	7	+1	6	2014 Coca Cola GM Final Round
3	Kagssagssuk Maniitsoq	3	1	0	2	8	4	+4	3	
4	Sisimiut-68	3	0	0	3	1	27	−26	0	

^{NB} Nuuk IL qualified for the Final Round as hosts.

=== East Greenland ===
Pos	Team	Pld	W	D	L	GF	GA	GD	Pts
1	TM-62	2	2	0	0	4	2	+2	6
2	A.T.A.-60	2	1	0	1	3	3	0	3
3	Kuummiut-64	2	0	0	2	4	6	−2	0

^{NB} TM-62 withdrew for financial reasons and were replaced by Nagtoralik Paamiut (South Greenland runners-up).

=== South Greenland ===
All matches were played in Qaqortoq.

Pos	Team	Pld	W	D	L	GF	GA	GD	Pts	Qualification or relegation
1	Eqaluk-54	3	1	2	0	6	5	+1	5	2014 Coca Cola GM Final Round
2	Nagtoralik Paamiut	3	1	1	1	4	4	0	4	Selected to replace East Greenland's qualifier
3	Kissaviarsuk-33	3	1	1	1	9	6	+3	4	
4	Narsaq-85	3	0	2	1	5	9	−4	2	

== Final round ==
=== Pool 1 ===
Pos	Team	Pld	W	D	L	GF	GA	GD	Pts	Qualification or relegation
1	B-67 Nuuk	3	2	1	0	10	1	+9	7	2014 Coca Cola GM Semi-finals
2	Inuit Timersoqatigiiffiat-79	3	2	0	1	7	6	+1	6	2014 Coca Cola GM Semi-finals
3	Nagdlunguaq-48	3	1	1	1	8	4	+4	4	2014 Coca Cola GM Fifth Place Match
4	Eqaluk-54	3	0	0	3	1	15	−14	0	2014 Coca Cola GM Seventh Place Match

4 August 2014

Eqaluk-54	0–6	B-67 Nuuk

Nuuk Stadium, Nuuk
4 August 2014

Nagdlunguaq-48	2–3	Inuit Timersoqatigiiffiat-79

Nuuk Stadium, Nuuk

5 August 2014

Eqaluk-54	0–5	Nagdlunguaq-48

Nuuk Stadium, Nuuk
5 August 2014

B-67 Nuuk	3–0	Inuit Timersoqatigiiffiat-79

Nuuk Stadium, Nuuk

6 August 2014

B-67 Nuuk	1–1	Nagdlunguaq-48

Nuuk Stadium, Nuuk
6 August 2014

Eqaluk-54	1–4	Inuit Timersoqatigiiffiat-79

Nuuk Stadium, Nuuk

=== Pool 2 ===
Pos	Team	Pld	W	D	L	GF	GA	GD	Pts	Qualification or relegation
1	FC Malamuk	3	2	1	0	8	3	+5	7	2014 Coca Cola GM Semi-finals
2	G-44 Qeqertarsuaq	3	1	2	0	5	3	+2	5	2014 Coca Cola GM Semi-finals
3	Nuuk IL	3	0	2	1	2	4	−2	2	2014 Coca Cola GM Fifth Place Match
4	Nagtoralik Paamiut	3	0	1	2	2	7	−5	1	2014 Coca Cola GM Seventh Place Match

4 August 2014

Nuuk IL	1–1	G-44 Qeqertarsuaq

Nuuk Stadium, Nuuk
4 August 2014

Nagtoralik Paamiut	1–4	FC Malamuk

Nuuk Stadium, Nuuk

5 August 2014

FC Malamuk	2–2	G-44 Qeqertarsuaq

Nuuk Stadium, Nuuk
5 August 2014

Nagtoralik Paamiut	1–1	Nuuk IL

Nuuk Stadium, Nuuk

6 August 2014

FC Malamuk	2–0	Nuuk IL

Nuuk Stadium, Nuuk
6 August 2014

Nagtoralik Paamiut	0–2	G-44 Qeqertarsuaq

Nuuk Stadium, Nuuk

== Playoffs ==
=== Semi-finals ===
8 August 2014

B-67 Nuuk	2–1	G-44 Qeqertarsuaq

Nuuk Stadium, Nuuk
8 August 2014

FC Malamuk	1–0	Inuit Timersoqatigiiffiat-79

Nuuk Stadium, Nuuk

=== Seventh-place match ===
8 August 2014

Eqaluk-54	3–2	Nagtoralik Paamiut

Nuuk Stadium, Nuuk

=== Fifth-place match ===
8 August 2014

Nagdlunguaq-48	1–0	Nuuk IL

Nuuk Stadium, Nuuk

=== Third-place match ===
9 August 2014

Inuit Timersoqatigiiffiat-79	2–1	G-44 Qeqertarsuaq

Nuuk Stadium, Nuuk

=== Final ===
9 August 2014

B-67 Nuuk	1–0	FC Malamuk

Nuuk Stadium, Nuuk

== See also ==
- Football in Greenland
- Football Association of Greenland
- Greenland national football team
- Greenlandic Men's Football Championship
