= 2011 Greenlandic Men's Football Championship =

2011 Coca Cola GM
- Season: 2011
- Champions: G-44 Qeqertarsuaq (2nd title)

The 2011 Coca-Cola GM was the 41st edition of the Greenlandic Men's Football Championship. The final round was held in Sisimiut from 14 to 20 August. It was won by G-44 Qeqertarsuaq for the second time in its history.

== Qualifying Stage ==
=== North Greenland ===
FC Malamuk and Eqaluk-56 qualified for the Final Round.

=== Disko Bay ===
Pos	Team	Pld	W	D	L	GF	GA	GD	Pts	Qualification or relegation
1	G-44 Qeqertarsuaq	5	4	1	0	16	3	+13	13	2011 Coca Cola GM Final Round
2	Kugsak-45	1	1	0	0	3	0	+3	9	2011 Coca Cola GM Final Round
3	Tupilak-41	1	1	0	0	4	2	+2	9	2011 Coca Cola GM Playoff Round
4	Nagdlunguaq-48	1	0	0	1	2	4	−2	0	
5	Ataneq BK	1	0	0	1	0	3	−3	0	
6	Ilulissat-69	1	0	0	1	0	6	−6	0	

^{NB} Some match results are unavailable.

=== Central Greenland ===
Pos	Team	Pld	W	D	L	GF	GA	GD	Pts	Qualification or relegation
1	B-67 Nuuk	3	3	0	0	12	0	+12	9	2011 Coca Cola GM Final Round
2	Kagssagssuk Maniitsoq	3	3	0	0	9	1	+8	9	2011 Coca Cola GM Final Round
3	Nuuk IL	3	1	1	1	6	6	0	4	
4	FC Tugtu	3	1	0	2	4	7	−3	3	
5	Inuit Timersoqatigiiffiat-79	3	0	1	2	3	8	−5	1	
6	Kangaamiut-85	3	0	0	3	0	12	−12	0	

^{NB} Some match results are unavailable. Siumut Amerdlok Kunuk qualified for the Final Round as hosts.

=== South Greenland ===
Kissaviarsuk-33 and Nagtoralik Paamiut qualified for the Final Round.

=== Playoff Round ===
Tupilak-41 qualified for the Final Round, after winning the Playoff Round against the North Greenland Third Place club.

== Final round ==
=== Pool 1 ===
Pos	Team	Pld	W	D	L	GF	GA	GD	Pts	Qualification or relegation
1	B-67 Nuuk	4	3	1	0	13	2	+11	10	2011 Coca Cola GM Semi Finals
2	G-44 Qeqertarsuaq	4	2	2	0	10	0	+10	8	2011 Coca Cola GM Semi Finals
3	Kugsak-45	4	1	2	1	10	5	+5	5	2011 Coca Cola GM Fifth Place Match
4	FC Malamuk	4	1	0	3	5	16	−11	3	2011 Coca Cola GM Seventh Place Match
5	Eqaluk-56	4	0	1	3	3	18	−15	1	2011 Coca Cola GM Ninth Place Match

14 August 2011
15:00

B-67 Nuuk	0–0	G-44 Qeqertarsuaq

Sisimiut Stadium, Sisimiut
14 August 2011
19:00

FC Malamuk	3–1	Eqaluk-56

Sisimiut Stadium, Sisimiut

15 August 2011
13:00

G-44 Qeqertarsuaq	0–0	Kugsak-45

Sisimiut Stadium, Sisimiut
15 August 2011
17:00

B-67 Nuuk	4–1	FC Malamuk

Sisimiut Stadium, Sisimiut

16 August 2011
13:00

Eqaluk-56	2–2	Kugsak-45

Sisimiut Stadium, Sisimiut
16 August 2011
17:00

G-44 Qeqertarsuaq	4–0	FC Malamuk

Sisimiut Stadium, Sisimiut

17 August 2011
13:00

B-67 Nuuk	7–0	Eqaluk-56

Sisimiut Stadium, Sisimiut
17 August 2011
17:00

Kugsak-45	7–1	FC Malamuk

Sisimiut Stadium, Sisimiut

18 August 2011
13:00

B-67 Nuuk	2–1	Kugsak-45

Sisimiut Stadium, Sisimiut
18 August 2011
17:00

G-44 Qeqertarsuaq	6–0	Eqaluk-56

Sisimiut Stadium, Sisimiut

=== Pool 2 ===
Pos	Team	Pld	W	D	L	GF	GA	GD	Pts	Qualification or relegation
1	Kissaviarsuk-33	4	2	0	2	12	2	+10	6	2011 Coca Cola GM Semi Finals
2	Tupilak-41	4	2	0	2	11	8	+3	6	2011 Coca Cola GM Semi Finals
3	Siumut Amerdlok Kunuk	4	2	0	2	11	8	+3	6	2011 Coca Cola GM Fifth Place Match
4	Nagtoralik Paamiut	4	2	0	2	4	7	−3	6	2011 Coca Cola GM Seventh Place Match
5	Kagssagssuk Maniitsoq	4	2	0	2	5	16	−11	6	2011 Coca Cola GM Ninth Place Match

14 August 2011
13:00

Siumut Amerdlok Kunuk	1–4	Tupilak-41

Sisimiut Stadium, Sisimiut
14 August 2011
17:00

Nagtoralik Paamiut	1–0	Kissaviarsuk-33

Sisimiut Stadium, Sisimiut

15 August 2011
15:00

Nagtoralik Paamiut	0–1	Kagssagssuk Maniitsoq

Sisimiut Stadium, Sisimiut
15 August 2011
19:00

Siumut Amerdlok Kunuk	2–1	Kissaviarsuk-33

Sisimiut Stadium, Sisimiut

16 August 2011
15:00

Kagssagssuk Maniitsoq	3–2	Tupilak-41

Sisimiut Stadium, Sisimiut
16 August 2011
19:00

Nagtoralik Paamiut	2–1	Siumut Amerdlok Kunuk

Sisimiut Stadium, Sisimiut

17 August 2011
15:00

Tupilak-41	0–3	Kissaviarsuk-33

Sisimiut Stadium, Sisimiut
17 August 2011
19:00

Kagssagssuk Maniitsoq	1–7	Siumut Amerdlok Kunuk

Sisimiut Stadium, Sisimiut

18 August 2011
15:00

Kissaviarsuk-33	7–0	Kagssagssuk Maniitsoq

Sisimiut Stadium, Sisimiut
18 August 2011
19:00

Tupilak-41	5–1	Nagtoralik Paamiut

Sisimiut Stadium, Sisimiut

== Playoffs ==
=== Semi finals ===
19 August 2011
17:00

B-67 Nuuk	7–0	Tupilak-41

Sisimiut Stadium, Sisimiut
19 August 2011
19:00

Kissaviarsuk-33	0–3	G-44 Qeqertarsuaq

Sisimiut Stadium, Sisimiut

=== Ninth Place Match ===
19 August 2011
13:00

Eqaluk-56	2–0	Kagssagssuk Maniitsoq

Sisimiut Stadium, Sisimiut

=== Seventh Place Match ===
19 August 2011
15:00

FC Malamuk	3–1	Nagtoralik Paamiut

Sisimiut Stadium, Sisimiut

=== Fifth Place Match ===
20 August 2011
12:00

Kugsak-45	4–3	Siumut Amerdlok Kunuk

Sisimiut Stadium, Sisimiut

=== Third place match ===
20 August 2011
14:00

Tupilak-41	4–1	Kissaviarsuk-33

Sisimiut Stadium, Sisimiut

=== Final ===
20 August 2011
16:00

G-44 Qeqertarsuaq	1–1 (a.e.t.)	B-67 Nuuk
Penalties
	7–6

Sisimiut Stadium, Sisimiut

== See also ==
- Football in Greenland
- Football Association of Greenland
- Greenland national football team
- Greenlandic Men's Football Championship
