= 1969 Greenlandic Football Championship =

Greenlandic Football Championship
- Season: 1969
- Champions: Kissaviarsuk-33 (3rd title)

The 1969 Greenlandic Football Championship was the seventh edition of the Greenlandic Men's Football Championship. The final round was held in Nuuk. It was the third football championship won by Kissaviarsuk-33.

== Qualifying stage ==
=== North Greenland ===
Nanok-50 qualified for the Final Round.

=== Disko Bay ===
Tupilak-41 qualified for the Final Round.

=== Central Greenland ===
Central Greenland First round
Sisimiut Final
Siumut Amerdlok Kunuk	7
Sisimiut-68	0
Maniitsoq Final
Kagssagssuk Maniitsoq	W
Unknown	L

Central Greenland quarter-finals
Nuuk Semi-finals
B-67 Nuuk	W
Iliarssuq	L
Nuuk Semi-finals
Grønlands Seminarius Sportklub	Unk
Nuuk IL	Unk
Sisimiut/Maniitsoq Final
Siumut Amerdlok Kunuk	W
Kagssagssuk Maniitsoq	L
Paamiut Final
Nagtoralik Paamiut	W
Unknown	L

Central Greenland semi-finals
Nuuk Final
B-67 Nuuk	W
Grønlands Seminarius Sportklub / Nuuk IL	L
Sisimiut/Maniitsoq/Paamiut Final
Siumut Amerdlok Kunuk	4
Nagtoralik Paamiut	2

Central Greenland final
B-67 Nuuk	5
Siumut Amerdlok Kunuk	2

B-67 Nuuk qualified for the Final Round.

=== South Greenland ===
Kissaviarsuk-33 qualified for the Final Round.

== Finals ==
Round of 16
Tupilak-41	W
unknown	L
Kugsak-45	unk
Nagdlunguaq-48	unk
Nanok-50	W
G-44 / Kingmeq-45 / FC Malamuk	L
G-44 / Kingmeq-45 / FC Malamuk	unk
G-44 / Kingmeq-45 / FC Malamuk	unk
Siumut Amerdlok Kunuk	2
B-67 Nuuk	5
GSS	unk
Nuuk IL	unk
Kissaviarsuk-33	W
unknown	L
Aassik-43	unk
Siuteroq Nanortalik-43	unk

Quarter finals
Tupilak-41	W
Kugsak-45 / Nagdlunguaq-48	L
Nanok-50	W
G-44 / Kingmeq-45 / FC Malamuk	L
B-67 Nuuk	W
GSS / Nuuk IL	L
Kissaviarsuk-33	W
Aassik-43 / Siuteroq Nanortalik-43	L

Semi finals
Tupilak-41	5
Nanok-50	3
B-67 Nuuk	1
Kissaviarsuk-33	2

Final
Tupilak-41	1
Kissaviarsuk-33 (a.e.t.)	2

=== Semi-finals ===
Kissaviarsuk-33	2–1	B-67 Nuuk

Nuuk Stadium, Nuuk

Tupilak-41	5–3	Nanok-50

Nuuk Stadium, Nuuk

=== Final ===
18 August 1969

Kissaviarsuk-33	2–0 (a.e.t.)	Tupilak-41

Nuuk Stadium, Nuuk

== See also ==
- Football in Greenland
- Football Association of Greenland
- Greenland national football team
- Greenlandic Football Championship
