= 2015 Greenlandic Football Championship =

2015 Coca Cola GM
- Season: 2015
- Champions: B-67 Nuuk (11th title)

The 2015 Coca-Cola GM was the 45th edition of the Greenlandic Men's Football Championship. The final round was held in Qasigiannguit from 3 to 8 August. It was won by B-67 Nuuk for the fourth consecutive time and for the eleventh time in its history.

== Qualifying stage ==
=== North Greenland ===
Pos	Team	Pld	W	D	L	GF	GA	GD	Pts	Qualification or relegation
1	FC Malamuk	3	3	0	0	11	2	+9	9	2015 Coca Cola GM Final Round
2	Upernavik BK 83	3	2	0	1	11	10	+1	6	
3	Eqaluk-56	3	1	0	2	10	10	0	3	
4	Umanak BK 68	3	0	0	3	4	14	−10	0	

=== Disko Bay ===
All matches were played in Ilulissat.

Pos	Team	Pld	W	D	L	GF	GA	GD	Pts	Qualification or relegation
1	G-44 Qeqertarsuaq	3	1	2	0	-	-	—	5	2015 Coca Cola GM Final Round
2	Tupilak-41	2	1	1	0	-	-	—	4	2015 Coca Cola GM Final Round
3	Nagdlunguaq-48	2	1	1	0	-	-	—	4	
4	Ilulissat-69	3	0	0	3	-	-	—	0	
5	Ilimanaq Ippernaq-53	0	0	0	0	0	0	0	0	Withdrew

^{NB} Some match results are unavailable.
^{NB} Kugsak-45 qualified for the Final Round as hosts.

=== Central Greenland ===
All matches were played in Sisimiut.

Pos	Team	Pld	W	D	L	GF	GA	GD	Pts	Qualification or relegation
1	Inuit Timersoqatigiiffiat-79	5	5	0	0	19	5	+14	15	2015 Coca Cola GM Final Round
2	B-67 Nuuk	5	4	0	1	21	5	+16	12	2015 Coca Cola GM Final Round
3	Siumut Amerdlok Kunuk	5	3	0	2	8	7	+1	9	Selected to replace East Greenland's qualifier
4	Nuuk IL	5	1	1	3	5	8	−3	4	
5	Kagssagssuk Maniitsoq	5	1	1	3	8	12	−4	4	
6	Sisimiut-68	5	0	0	5	1	25	−24	0	

=== East Greenland ===
Pos	Team
1	A.T.A.-60
2	Kuummiut-64
3	TM-62

A.T.A.-60 qualified for the Final Round.

^{NB} A.T.A.-60 withdrew for financial reasons and were replaced by Siumut Amerdlok Kunuk (Central Greenland runners-up).

=== South Greenland ===
All matches were played in Narsaq.

Pos	Team	Pld	W	D	L	GF	GA	GD	Pts	Qualification or relegation
1	Kissaviarsuk-33	4	3	1	0	-	-	—	10	2015 Coca Cola GM Final Round
2	Eqaluk-54	4	2	1	1	-	-	—	7	
3	Narsaq-85	4	0	0	4	-	-	—	0	

== Final round ==
=== Pool 1 ===
Pos	Team	Pld	W	D	L	GF	GA	GD	Pts	Qualification or relegation
1	Kugsak-45	3	3	0	0	6	1	+5	9	2015 Coca Cola GM Semi-finals
2	G-44 Qeqertarsuaq	3	2	0	1	8	4	+4	6	2015 Coca Cola GM Semi-finals
3	Siumut Amerdlok Kunuk	3	1	0	2	3	3	0	3	2015 Coca Cola GM Fifth Place Match
4	FC Malamuk	3	0	0	3	0	9	−9	0	2015 Coca Cola GM Seventh Place Match

3 August 2015

Kugsak-45	1–0	Siumut Amerdlok Kunuk

Qasigiannguit Stadium, Qasigiannguit
3 August 2015

FC Malamuk	0–5	G-44 Qeqertarsuaq

Qasigiannguit Stadium, Qasigiannguit

4 August 2015

Kugsak-45	2–0	FC Malamuk

Qasigiannguit Stadium, Qasigiannguit
4 August 2015

Siumut Amerdlok Kunuk	1–2	G-44 Qeqertarsuaq

Qasigiannguit Stadium, Qasigiannguit

5 August 2015

Siumut Amerdlok Kunuk	2–0	FC Malamuk

Qasigiannguit Stadium, Qasigiannguit
5 August 2015

Kugsak-45	3–1	G-44 Qeqertarsuaq

Qasigiannguit Stadium, Qasigiannguit

=== Pool 2 ===
Pos	Team	Pld	W	D	L	GF	GA	GD	Pts	Qualification or relegation
1	B-67 Nuuk	3	3	0	0	11	2	+9	9	2015 Coca Cola GM Semi-finals
2	Inuit Timersoqatigiiffiat-79	3	2	0	1	9	3	+6	6	2015 Coca Cola GM Semi-finals
3	Tupilak-41	3	1	0	2	4	8	−4	3	2015 Coca Cola GM Fifth Place Match
4	Kissaviarsuk-33	3	0	0	3	4	15	−11	0	2015 Coca Cola GM Seventh Place Match

3 August 2015

Tupilak-41	0–3	B-67 Nuuk

Qasigiannguit Stadium, Qasigiannguit
3 August 2015

Kissaviarsuk-33	1–5	Inuit Timersoqatigiiffiat-79

Qasigiannguit Stadium, Qasigiannguit

4 August 2015

Tupilak-41	4–2	Kissaviarsuk-33

Qasigiannguit Stadium, Qasigiannguit
4 August 2015

B-67 Nuuk	2–1	Inuit Timersoqatigiiffiat-79

Qasigiannguit Stadium, Qasigiannguit

5 August 2015

B-67 Nuuk	6–1	Kissaviarsuk-33

Qasigiannguit Stadium, Qasigiannguit
5 August 2015

Tupilak-41	0–3	Inuit Timersoqatigiiffiat-79

Qasigiannguit Stadium, Qasigiannguit

== Playoffs ==
=== Semi-finals ===
7 August 2015

Kugsak-45	0–2	Inuit Timersoqatigiiffiat-79

Qasigiannguit Stadium, Qasigiannguit
7 August 2015

B-67 Nuuk	1–0	G-44 Qeqertarsuaq

Qasigiannguit Stadium, Qasigiannguit

=== Seventh-place match ===
7 August 2015

FC Malamuk	3–4	Kissaviarsuk-33

Qasigiannguit Stadium, Qasigiannguit

=== Fifth-place match ===
7 August 2015

Siumut Amerdlok Kunuk	1–5	Tupilak-41

Qasigiannguit Stadium, Qasigiannguit

=== Third-place match ===
8 August 2015

Kugsak-45	0–4	G-44 Qeqertarsuaq

Qasigiannguit Stadium, Qasigiannguit

=== Final ===
8 August 2015

B-67 Nuuk	3–1	Inuit Timersoqatigiiffiat-79
Niels Svane 12'; Anders Petersen 21'; ? 67'		Marcus Jensen 8'

Qasigiannguit Stadium, Qasigiannguit

== See also ==
- Football in Greenland
- Football Association of Greenland
- Greenland national football team
- Greenlandic Men's Football Championship
