= 2004 Greenlandic Men's Football Championship =

2004 Coca-Cola GM
- Season: 2004
- Champions: FC Malamuk (1st title)

The 2004 Coca-Cola GM was the 34th edition of the Greenlandic Men's Football Championship. The final round was held in Nuuk, Greenland. It was won by FC Malamuk for the first time in its history.

== Qualifying stage ==
=== North Greenland ===
FC Malamuk qualified for the final Round.

=== Disko Bay ===
Kugsak-45 and Nagdlunguaq-48 qualified for the final Round.

=== Central Greenland ===
B-67 Nuuk and Nuuk IL qualified for the final Round.

=== East Greenland ===
A.T.A.-60 qualified for the final Round.

=== South Greenland ===
Narsaq-85 and Nagtoralik Paamiut qualified for the final Round.

== Final round ==
=== Pool 1 ===
Pos	Team	Pld	W	D	L	GF	GA	GD	Pts	Qualification or relegation
1	Nagdlunguaq-48	3	2	1	0	8	0	+8	7	2004 Coca-Cola GM Semi-finals
2	B-67 Nuuk	3	1	2	0	4	1	+3	5	2004 Coca-Cola GM Semi-finals
3	Narsaq-85	3	1	1	1	8	6	+2	4	2004 Coca-Cola GM Fifth Place Match
4	Nagtoralik Paamiut	3	0	0	3	1	14	−13	0	2004 Coca-Cola GM Seventh Place Match

Nagdlunguaq-48	0–0	B-67 Nuuk

Nuuk Stadium, Nuuk

Nagtoralik Paamiut	1–7	Narsaq-85

Nuuk Stadium, Nuuk

B-67 Nuuk	1–1	Narsaq-85

Nuuk Stadium, Nuuk

Nagdlunguaq-48	4–0	Nagtoralik Paamiut

Nuuk Stadium, Nuuk

B-67 Nuuk	3–0	Nagtoralik Paamiut

Nuuk Stadium, Nuuk

Nagdlunguaq-48	4–0	Narsaq-85

Nuuk Stadium, Nuuk

=== Pool 2 ===
Pos	Team	Pld	W	D	L	GF	GA	GD	Pts	Qualification or relegation
1	Kugsak-45	3	3	0	0	7	2	+5	9	2004 Coca-Cola GM Semi-finals
2	FC Malamuk	3	2	0	1	9	5	+4	6	2004 Coca-Cola GM Semi-finals
3	Nuuk IL	3	1	0	2	4	7	−3	3	2004 Coca-Cola GM Fifth Place Match
4	A.T.A.-60	3	0	0	3	2	8	−6	0	2004 Coca-Cola GM Seventh Place Match

A.T.A.-60	2–4	FC Malamuk

Nuuk Stadium, Nuuk

Nuuk IL	1–3	Kugsak-45

Nuuk Stadium, Nuuk

FC Malamuk	1–3	Kugsak-45

Nuuk Stadium, Nuuk

A.T.A.-60	0–3	Nuuk IL

Nuuk Stadium, Nuuk

FC Malamuk	4–0	Nuuk IL

Nuuk Stadium, Nuuk

A.T.A.-60	0–1	Kugsak-45

Nuuk Stadium, Nuuk

== Playoffs ==
=== Semi-finals ===
Nagdlunguaq-48	1–2	FC Malamuk

Nuuk Stadium, Nuuk

Kugsak-45	0–4	B-67 Nuuk

Nuuk Stadium, Nuuk

=== Seventh-place match ===
Nagtoralik Paamiut	6–4	A.T.A.-60

Nuuk Stadium, Nuuk

=== Fifth-place match ===
Narsaq-85	1–0	Nuuk IL

Nuuk Stadium, Nuuk

=== Third-place match ===
Nagdlunguaq-48	4–3	Kugsak-45

Nuuk Stadium, Nuuk

=== Final ===
FC Malamuk	1–0	B-67 Nuuk
10' Jorsi Skade

Nuuk Stadium, Nuuk

== See also ==
- Football in Greenland
- Football Association of Greenland
- Greenland national football team
- Greenlandic Men's Football Championship
