= 1997 Greenlandic Men's Football Championship =

- Season: 1997
- Champions: Nuuk IL (6th title)

The 1997 Greenlandic Men's Football Championship was the 27th edition of the Greenlandic Men's Football Championship. The final round was held in Maniitsoq. It was won by Nuuk IL for the sixth time in its history.

== Final round ==
=== Pool 1 ===
Pos	Team	Pld	W	D	L	GF	GA	GD	Pts	Qualification or relegation
1	Nuuk IL	3	3	0	0	9	3	+6	9	1997 Greenlandic Men's Football Championship Semi-finals
2	Kagssagssuk Maniitsoq	3	1	1	1	8	8	0	4	1997 Greenlandic Men's Football Championship Semi-finals
3	Nagdlunguaq-48	3	1	0	2	6	9	−3	3	1997 Greenlandic Men's Football Championship Fifth Place Match
4	FC Malamuk	3	0	1	2	7	10	−3	1	1997 Greenlandic Men's Football Championship Seventh Place Match

24 August 1997

Nuuk IL	4–1	Nagdlunguaq-48

Maniitsoq Stadium, Maniitsoq
24 August 1997

Kagssagssuk Maniitsoq	4–4	FC Malamuk

Maniitsoq Stadium, Maniitsoq

25 August 1997

Nagdlunguaq-48	2–4	Kagssagssuk Maniitsoq

Maniitsoq Stadium, Maniitsoq
25 August 1997

Nuuk IL	3–2	FC Malamuk

Maniitsoq Stadium, Maniitsoq

26 August 1997

Nuuk IL	2–0	Kagssagssuk Maniitsoq

Maniitsoq Stadium, Maniitsoq
26 August 1997

Nagdlunguaq-48	3–1	FC Malamuk

Maniitsoq Stadium, Maniitsoq

=== Pool 2 ===
Pos	Team	Pld	W	D	L	GF	GA	GD	Pts	Qualification or relegation
1	Kissaviarsuk-33	3	2	1	0	19	6	+13	7	1997 Greenlandic Men's Football Championship Semi-finals
2	Kugsak-45	3	2	0	1	15	7	+8	6	1997 Greenlandic Men's Football Championship Semi-finals
3	A.T.A.-60	3	1	0	2	6	24	−18	3	1997 Greenlandic Men's Football Championship Fifth Place Match
4	B-67 Nuuk	3	0	1	2	6	9	−3	1	1997 Greenlandic Men's Football Championship Seventh Place Match

24 August 1997

Kissaviarsuk-33	12–1	A.T.A.-60

Maniitsoq Stadium, Maniitsoq
24 August 1997

B-67 Nuuk	1–3	Kugsak-45

Maniitsoq Stadium, Maniitsoq

25 August 1997

Kissaviarsuk-33	4–2	Kugsak-45

Maniitsoq Stadium, Maniitsoq
25 August 1997

A.T.A.-60	3–2	B-67 Nuuk

Maniitsoq Stadium, Maniitsoq

26 August 1997

Kugsak-45	10–2	A.T.A.-60

Maniitsoq Stadium, Maniitsoq
26 August 1997

Kissaviarsuk-33	3–3	B-67 Nuuk

Maniitsoq Stadium, Maniitsoq

== Playoffs ==
=== Semi-finals ===
Nuuk IL	2–0	Kugsak-45

Maniitsoq Stadium, Maniitsoq

Kissaviarsuk-33	3–2	Kagssagssuk Maniitsoq

Maniitsoq Stadium, Maniitsoq

=== Seventh-place match ===
B-67 Nuuk	5–2	FC Malamuk

Maniitsoq Stadium, Maniitsoq

=== Fifth-place match ===
Nagdlunguaq-48	2–5	A.T.A.-60

Maniitsoq Stadium, Maniitsoq

=== Third-place match ===
Kagssagssuk Maniitsoq	2–4	Kugsak-45

Maniitsoq Stadium, Maniitsoq

=== Final ===
Nuuk IL	4–0	Kissaviarsuk-33

Maniitsoq Stadium, Maniitsoq
Attendance: 500

== See also ==
- Football in Greenland
- Football Association of Greenland
- Greenland national football team
- Greenlandic Men's Football Championship
