= 2009 Greenlandic Men's Football Championship =

2009 Coca Cola GM
- Season: 2009
- Champions: G-44 Qeqertarsuaq (1st title)

The 2009 Coca-Cola GM was the 39th edition of the Greenlandic Men's Football Championship. The final round was held in Qeqertarsuaq from 10 to 15 August. It was won by G-44 Qeqertarsuaq for the first time in its history.

== Qualifying stage ==
=== North Greenland ===
Pos	Team	Pld	W	D	L	GF	GA	GD	Pts	Qualification or relegation
1	FC Malamuk	3	2	1	0	21	1	+20	7	2009 Coca Cola GM Final Round
2	Amaroq Saattut	3	1	2	0	7	6	+1	5	
3	Umanak BK 68	3	1	0	2	5	12	−7	3	
4	Kingmeq-45	3	0	1	2	3	17	−14	1	

=== Disko Bay ===
Nagdlunguaq-48 and Kangaatsiaq BK 84 qualified for the final Round.

^{NB} G-44 Qeqertarsuaq qualified for the final Round as hosts.

=== Central Greenland ===
Pos	Team	Pld	W	D	L	GF	GA	GD	Pts	Qualification or relegation
1	Siumut Amerdlok Kunuk	4	3	1	0	10	3	+7	10	2009 Coca Cola GM Final Round
2	Nuuk IL	4	3	0	1	-	-	—	9	2009 Coca Cola GM Final Round
3	B-67 Nuuk	4	2	1	1	-	-	—	7	
4	Kagssagssuk Maniitsoq	3	0	0	3	1	9	−8	0	
5	Kangaamiut-85	3	0	0	3	3	19	−16	0	

^{NB} Some match results are unavailable.

=== East Greenland ===
A.T.A.-60 qualified for the final Round.

=== South Greenland ===
Pos	Team	Pld	W	D	L	GF	GA	GD	Pts	Qualification or relegation
1	Eqaluk-54	5	5	0	0	34	5	+29	15	2009 Coca Cola GM Final Round
2	Kissaviarsuk-33	5	4	0	1	52	1	+51	12	
3	Narsaq-85	5	3	0	2	43	10	+33	9	
4	Pameq-45	5	2	0	3	14	27	−13	6	
5	K-1944 Narsarmiit	5	1	0	4	14	27	−13	3	
6	Siuteroq Nanortalik-43	5	0	0	5	3	80	−77	0	

== Final round ==
=== Pool 1 ===
Pos	Team	Pld	W	D	L	GF	GA	GD	Pts	Qualification or relegation
1	G-44 Qeqertarsuaq	3	2	1	0	9	1	+8	7	2009 Coca Cola GM Semi-finals
2	Eqaluk-54	3	1	1	1	4	6	−2	4	2009 Coca Cola GM Semi-finals
3	Nagdlunguaq-48	3	1	1	1	10	3	+7	4	2009 Coca Cola GM Fifth Place Match
4	A.T.A.-60	3	0	1	2	2	15	−13	1	2009 Coca Cola GM Seventh Place Match

^{NB} Teams tied on points were separated by head-to-head record.

10 August 2009

G-44 Qeqertarsuaq	1–1	Nagdlunguaq-48

Qeqertarsuaq Stadium, Qeqertarsuaq
10 August 2009

A.T.A.-60	2–2	Eqaluk-54

Qeqertarsuaq Stadium, Qeqertarsuaq

11 August 2009

A.T.A.-60	0–4	G-44 Qeqertarsuaq

Qeqertarsuaq Stadium, Qeqertarsuaq
11 August 2009

Eqaluk-54	2–0	Nagdlunguaq-48

Qeqertarsuaq Stadium, Qeqertarsuaq

12 August 2009

A.T.A.-60	0–9	Nagdlunguaq-48

Qeqertarsuaq Stadium, Qeqertarsuaq
12 August 2009

Eqaluk-54	0–4	G-44 Qeqertarsuaq

Qeqertarsuaq Stadium, Qeqertarsuaq

=== Pool 2 ===
Pos	Team	Pld	W	D	L	GF	GA	GD	Pts	Qualification or relegation
1	FC Malamuk	3	2	0	1	3	2	+1	6	2009 Coca Cola GM Semi-finals
2	Siumut Amerdlok Kunuk	3	1	1	1	5	4	+1	4	2009 Coca Cola GM Semi-finals
3	Nuuk IL	3	1	1	1	5	5	0	4	2009 Coca Cola GM Fifth Place Match
4	Kangaatsiaq BK 84	3	0	1	2	3	5	−2	1	2009 Coca Cola GM Seventh Place Match

^{NB} Teams tied on points were separated by head-to-head record.

10 August 2009

Nuuk IL	2–1	FC Malamuk

Qeqertarsuaq Stadium, Qeqertarsuaq
10 August 2009

Kangaatsiaq BK 84	1–3	Siumut Amerdlok Kunuk

Qeqertarsuaq Stadium, Qeqertarsuaq

11 August 2009

Nuuk IL	1–2	Kangaatsiaq BK 84

Qeqertarsuaq Stadium, Qeqertarsuaq
11 August 2009

FC Malamuk	1–0	Siumut Amerdlok Kunuk

Qeqertarsuaq Stadium, Qeqertarsuaq

12 August 2009

Nuuk IL	2–2	Siumut Amerdlok Kunuk

Qeqertarsuaq Stadium, Qeqertarsuaq
12 August 2009

FC Malamuk	1–0	Kangaatsiaq BK 84

Qeqertarsuaq Stadium, Qeqertarsuaq

== Playoffs ==
=== Semi-finals ===
14 August 2009

FC Malamuk	4–0	Eqaluk-54

Qeqertarsuaq Stadium, Qeqertarsuaq
14 August 2009

G-44 Qeqertarsuaq	3–2	Siumut Amerdlok Kunuk

Qeqertarsuaq Stadium, Qeqertarsuaq

=== Seventh-place match ===
14 August 2009

Kangaatsiaq BK 84	6–3	A.T.A.-60

Qeqertarsuaq Stadium, Qeqertarsuaq

=== Fifth-place match ===
14 August 2009

Nagdlunguaq-48	1–0	Nuuk IL

Qeqertarsuaq Stadium, Qeqertarsuaq

=== Third-place match ===
15 August 2009

Eqaluk-54	3–3 (a.e.t.)	Siumut Amerdlok Kunuk
Penalties
	2–1

Qeqertarsuaq Stadium, Qeqertarsuaq

=== Final ===
15 August 2009

G-44 Qeqertarsuaq	3–0	FC Malamuk

Qeqertarsuaq Stadium, Qeqertarsuaq

== See also ==
- Football in Greenland
- Football Association of Greenland
- Greenland national football team
- Greenlandic Men's Football Championship
