= 2007 Greenlandic Men's Football Championship =

2007 Coca Cola GM
- Season: 2007
- Champions: Nagdlunguaq-48 (10th title)

The 2007 Coca-Cola GM was the 37th edition of the Greenlandic Men's Football Championship. The final round was held in Nuuk from 6 to 11 August. It was won by Nagdlunguaq-48 for the tenth time in its history.

== Qualifying stage ==
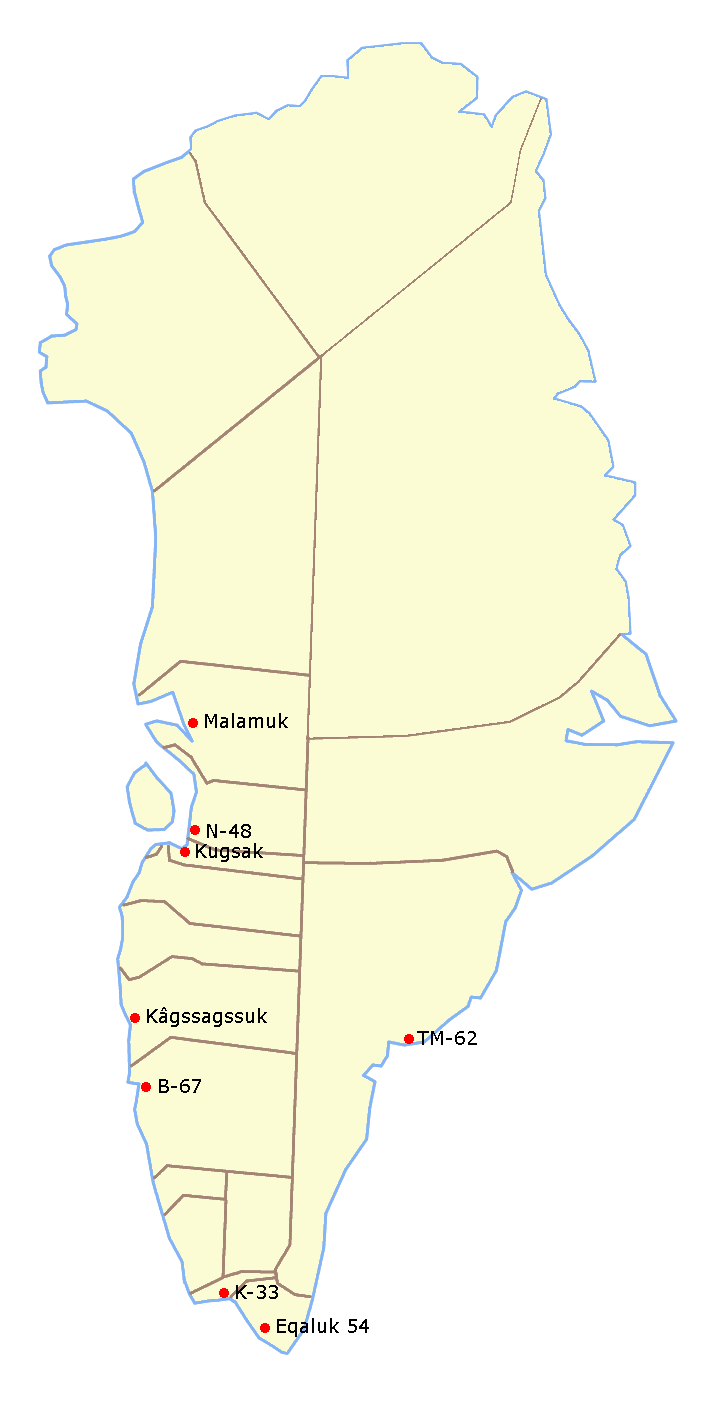
Location of teams participating in the 2007 Greenlandic Men's Football Championship.

=== North Greenland ===
FC Malamuk qualified for the final Round.

=== Disko Bay ===
Nagdlunguaq-48 and Kugsak-45 qualified for the final Round.

=== Central Greenland ===
Kagssagssuk Maniitsoq qualified for the final Round.

^{NB} B-67 Nuuk qualified for the final Round as hosts.

=== East Greenland ===
TM-62 qualified for the final Round.

=== South Greenland ===
Eqaluk-54 and Kissaviarsuk-33 qualified for the final Round.

== Final round ==
=== Pool 1 ===
Pos	Team	Pld	W	D	L	GF	GA	GD	Pts	Qualification or relegation
1	TM-62	3	2	1	0	5	2	+3	7	2007 Coca Cola GM Semi-finals
2	Nagdlunguaq-48	3	1	2	0	5	2	+3	5	2007 Coca Cola GM Semi-finals
3	Eqaluk-54	3	1	0	2	6	7	−1	3	2007 Coca Cola GM Fifth Place Match
4	Kagssagssuk Maniitsoq	3	0	1	2	4	9	−5	1	2007 Coca Cola GM Seventh Place Match

6 August 2007

TM-62	2–0	Eqaluk-54

Nuuk Stadium, Nuuk

7 August 2007

TM-62	2–1	Kagssagssuk Maniitsoq

Nuuk Stadium, Nuuk
7 August 2007

Eqaluk-54	0–3	Nagdlunguaq-48

Nuuk Stadium, Nuuk

8 August 2007

TM-62	1–1	Nagdlunguaq-48

Nuuk Stadium, Nuuk
8 August 2007

Eqaluk-54	6–2	Kagssagssuk Maniitsoq

Nuuk Stadium, Nuuk

9 August 2007

Kagssagssuk Maniitsoq	1–1	Nagdlunguaq-48

Nuuk Stadium, Nuuk

=== Pool 2 ===
Pos	Team	Pld	W	D	L	GF	GA	GD	Pts	Qualification or relegation
1	Kissaviarsuk-33	3	2	0	1	3	3	0	6	2007 Coca Cola GM Semi-finals
2	Kugsak-45	3	1	1	1	2	2	0	4	2007 Coca Cola GM Semi-finals
3	FC Malamuk	3	1	1	1	3	5	−2	4	2007 Coca Cola GM Fifth Place Match
4	B-67 Nuuk	3	1	0	2	5	3	+2	3	2007 Coca Cola GM Seventh Place Match

6 August 2007

FC Malamuk	0–4	B-67 Nuuk

Nuuk Stadium, Nuuk

7 August 2007

Kugsak-45	1–1	FC Malamuk

Nuuk Stadium, Nuuk
7 August 2007

Kissaviarsuk-33	2–1	B-67 Nuuk

Nuuk Stadium, Nuuk

8 August 2007

Kugsak-45	1–0	B-67 Nuuk

Nuuk Stadium, Nuuk
8 August 2007

Kissaviarsuk-33	0–2	FC Malamuk

Nuuk Stadium, Nuuk

9 August 2007

Kugsak-45	0–1	Kissaviarsuk-33

Nuuk Stadium, Nuuk

== Playoffs ==
=== Semi-finals ===
10 August 2007

TM-62	0–2	Kugsak-45

Nuuk Stadium, Nuuk
10 August 2007

Kissaviarsuk-33	0–1	Nagdlunguaq-48

Nuuk Stadium, Nuuk

=== Seventh-place match ===
10 August 2007

Kagssagssuk Maniitsoq	0–10	B-67 Nuuk

Nuuk Stadium, Nuuk

=== Fifth-place match ===
10 August 2007

Eqaluk-54	1–2	FC Malamuk

Nuuk Stadium, Nuuk

=== Third-place match ===
11 August 2007

Kissaviarsuk-33	1–0	TM-62

Nuuk Stadium, Nuuk

=== Final ===
11 August 2007

Nagdlunguaq-48	2–0	Kugsak-45

Nuuk Stadium, Nuuk

== See also ==
- Football in Greenland
- Football Association of Greenland
- Greenland national football team
- Greenlandic Men's Football Championship
