= 2012 Greenlandic Men's Football Championship =

2012 Coca Cola GM
- Season: 2012
- Champions: B-67 Nuuk (8th title)

The 2012 Coca-Cola GM was the 42nd edition of the Greenlandic Men's Football Championship. The final round was held in Ilulissat from 5 to 11 August. It was won by B-67 Nuuk for the eighth time in its history.

== Qualifying Stage ==
=== North Greenland ===
FC Malamuk and Upernavik BK 83 qualified for the Final Round.

=== Disko Bay ===
G-44 Qeqertarsuaq and Kugsak-45 qualified for the Final Round.

^{NB} Nagdlunguaq-48 qualified for the Final Round as hosts.

=== Central Greenland ===
B-67 Nuuk and Siumut Amerdlok Kunuk qualified for the Final Round.

=== East Greenland ===
A.T.A.-60 qualified for the Final Round.

=== South Greenland ===
Pos	Team	Pld	W	D	L	GF	GA	GD	Pts	Qualification or relegation
1	Eqaluk-54	4	3	1	0	18	5	+13	10	2012 Coca Cola GM Final Round
2	Nagtoralik Paamiut	4	3	0	1	11	9	+2	9	2012 Coca Cola GM Final Round
3	Kissaviarsuk-33	4	2	1	1	13	4	+9	7	
4	Siuteroq Nanortalik-43	4	1	0	3	9	20	−11	3	
5	Narsaq-85	4	0	0	4	4	17	−13	0	

== Final round ==
=== Pool 1 ===
Pos	Team	Pld	W	D	L	GF	GA	GD	Pts	Qualification or relegation
1	G-44 Qeqertarsuaq	4	4	0	0	17	1	+16	12	2012 Coca Cola GM Semi Finals
2	FC Malamuk	4	3	0	1	11	5	+6	9	2012 Coca Cola GM Semi Finals
3	Eqaluk-54	4	2	0	2	14	7	+7	6	
4	Siumut Amerdlok Kunuk	4	1	0	3	10	13	−3	3	
5	Upernavik BK 83	4	0	0	4	4	30	−26	0	

5 August 2012

Eqaluk-54	10–1	Upernavik BK 83

Ilulissat Stadium, Ilulissat
5 August 2012

G-44 Qeqertarsuaq	5–0	Siumut Amerdlok Kunuk

Ilulissat Stadium, Ilulissat

6 August 2012

G-44 Qeqertarsuaq	2–0	Eqaluk-54

Ilulissat Stadium, Ilulissat
6 August 2012

Upernavik BK 83	0–6	FC Malamuk

Ilulissat Stadium, Ilulissat

7 August 2012

Siumut Amerdlok Kunuk	2–3	FC Malamuk

Ilulissat Stadium, Ilulissat
7 August 2012

G-44 Qeqertarsuaq	8–1	Upernavik BK 83

Ilulissat Stadium, Ilulissat

8 August 2012

Siumut Amerdlok Kunuk	2–3	Eqaluk-54

Ilulissat Stadium, Ilulissat
8 August 2012

G-44 Qeqertarsuaq	2–0	FC Malamuk

Ilulissat Stadium, Ilulissat

9 August 2012

Upernavik BK 83	2–6	Siumut Amerdlok Kunuk

Ilulissat Stadium, Ilulissat
9 August 2012

Eqaluk-54	1–2	FC Malamuk

Ilulissat Stadium, Ilulissat

=== Pool 2 ===
Pos	Team	Pld	W	D	L	GF	GA	GD	Pts	Qualification or relegation
1	B-67 Nuuk	4	3	1	0	19	1	+18	10	2012 Coca Cola GM Semi Finals
2	Nagdlunguaq-48	4	3	1	0	15	3	+12	10	2012 Coca Cola GM Semi Finals
3	Kugsak-45	4	2	0	2	7	11	−4	6	
4	Nagtoralik Paamiut	4	1	0	3	9	17	−8	3	
5	A.T.A.-60	4	0	0	4	2	20	−18	0	

5 August 2012

B-67 Nuuk	4–0	Kugsak-45

Ilulissat Stadium, Ilulissat
5 August 2012

Nagdlunguaq-48	4–1	Nagtoralik Paamiut

Ilulissat Stadium, Ilulissat

6 August 2012

B-67 Nuuk	6–0	A.T.A.-60

Ilulissat Stadium, Ilulissat
6 August 2012

Nagdlunguaq-48	4–1	Kugsak-45

Ilulissat Stadium, Ilulissat

7 August 2012

A.T.A.-60	1–6	Nagtoralik Paamiut

Ilulissat Stadium, Ilulissat
7 August 2012

B-67 Nuuk	1–1	Nagdlunguaq-48

Ilulissat Stadium, Ilulissat

8 August 2012

Kugsak-45	4–2	Nagtoralik Paamiut

Ilulissat Stadium, Ilulissat
8 August 2012

Nagdlunguaq-48	6–0	A.T.A.-60

Ilulissat Stadium, Ilulissat

9 August 2012

B-67 Nuuk	8–0	Nagtoralik Paamiut

Ilulissat Stadium, Ilulissat
9 August 2012

Kugsak-45	2–1	A.T.A.-60

Ilulissat Stadium, Ilulissat

== Playoffs ==
=== Semi finals ===
10 August 2012

B-67 Nuuk	6–0	FC Malamuk

Ilulissat Stadium, Ilulissat
10 August 2012

G-44 Qeqertarsuaq	0–3	Nagdlunguaq-48

Ilulissat Stadium, Ilulissat

=== Third place match ===
11 August 2012

G-44 Qeqertarsuaq	6–0	FC Malamuk

Ilulissat Stadium, Ilulissat

=== Final ===
11 August 2012

B-67 Nuuk	3–2	Nagdlunguaq-48

Ilulissat Stadium, Ilulissat

== See also ==
- Football in Greenland
- Football Association of Greenland
- Greenland national football team
- Greenlandic Men's Football Championship
