= 1999 Greenlandic Men's Football Championship =

- Season: 1999
- Champions: B-67 Nuuk (4th title)

The 1999 Greenlandic Men's Football Championship was the 29th edition of the Greenlandic Men's Football Championship. The final round was held in Nuuk. It was won by B-67 Nuuk for the fourth time in its history.

== Qualifying stage ==
=== North Greenland ===
Pos	Team	Pld	W	D	L	GF	GA	GD	Pts	Qualification or relegation
1	Kugsak-45	5	5	0	0	29	4	+25	15	1999 Greenlandic Men's Football Championship Final Round
2	Nagdlunguaq-48	5	3	1	1	20	8	+12	10	1999 Greenlandic Men's Football Championship Final Round
3	Disko-76	5	2	2	1	20	12	+8	8	1999 Greenlandic Men's Football Championship Final Round
4	Ilulissat-69	5	2	1	2	16	7	+9	7	
5	FC Malamuk	5	1	0	4	10	20	−10	3	
6	Niaqornaarsuk-88	5	0	0	5	4	48	−44	0	

=== Central Greenland ===
Pos	Team	Pld	W	D	L	GF	GA	GD	Pts	Qualification or relegation
1	B-67 Nuuk	4	3	1	0	14	2	+12	10	1999 Greenlandic Men's Football Championship Final Round
2	Nuuk IL	4	3	0	1	12	3	+9	9	1999 Greenlandic Men's Football Championship Final Round
3	Siumut Amerdlok Kunuk	4	2	1	1	20	5	+15	7	1999 Greenlandic Men's Football Championship Final Round
4	Kagssagssuk Maniitsoq	4	1	0	3	4	12	−8	3	
5	B-67 Nuuk B	4	0	0	4	2	30	−28	0	

=== South Greenland ===
Pos	Team	Pld	W	D	L	GF	GA	GD	Pts	Qualification or relegation
1	Kissaviarsuk-33	6	4	1	1	39	9	+30	13	1999 Greenlandic Men's Football Championship Final Round
2	Narsaq-85	6	4	1	1	24	13	+11	13	1999 Greenlandic Men's Football Championship Final Round
3	Siuteroq Nanortalik-43	5	2	0	3	9	14	−5	6	
4	QAA-Qaqortoq	5	0	0	5	6	42	−36	0	

^{NB} The result of one match is unavailable.

== Final round ==
=== Pool 1 ===
Pos	Team	Pld	W	D	L	GF	GA	GD	Pts	Qualification or relegation
1	B-67 Nuuk	3	3	0	0	13	2	+11	9	1999 Greenlandic Men's Football Championship Semi-finals
2	Kugsak-45	3	2	0	1	9	4	+5	6	1999 Greenlandic Men's Football Championship Semi-finals
3	Narsaq-85	3	1	0	2	3	9	−6	3	1999 Greenlandic Men's Football Championship Fifth Place Match
4	Siumut Amerdlok Kunuk	3	0	0	3	3	13	−10	0	1999 Greenlandic Men's Football Championship Seventh Place Match

=== Pool 2 ===
Pos	Team	Pld	W	D	L	GF	GA	GD	Pts	Qualification or relegation
1	Kissaviarsuk-33	3	2	1	0	8	3	+5	7	1999 Greenlandic Men's Football Championship Semi-finals
2	Nuuk IL	3	2	0	1	3	1	+2	6	1999 Greenlandic Men's Football Championship Semi-finals
3	Disko-76	3	1	0	2	6	6	0	3	1999 Greenlandic Men's Football Championship Fifth Place Match
4	Nagdlunguaq-48	3	0	1	2	4	11	−7	1	1999 Greenlandic Men's Football Championship Seventh Place Match

== Playoffs ==
=== Semi-finals ===
28 August 1999

B-67 Nuuk	3–1	Nuuk IL

Nuuk Stadium, Nuuk
28 August 1999

Kugsak-45	2–2 (a.e.t.)	Kissaviarsuk-33
Penalties
	8–7

Nuuk Stadium, Nuuk

=== Seventh-place match ===
29 August 1999

Nagdlunguaq-48	3–0	Siumut Amerdlok Kunuk

Nuuk Stadium, Nuuk

=== Fifth-place match ===
29 August 1999

Disko-76	5–0	Narsaq-85

Nuuk Stadium, Nuuk

=== Third-place match ===
30 August 1999

Kissaviarsuk-33	3–1	Nuuk IL

Nuuk Stadium, Nuuk

=== Final ===
30 August 1999

B-67 Nuuk	3–1	Kugsak-45

Nuuk Stadium, Nuuk

== See also ==
- Football in Greenland
- Football Association of Greenland
- Greenland national football team
- Greenlandic Men's Football Championship
