= 2018 Greenlandic Football Championship =

2018 GrønlandsBANKEN GM
- Season: 2018
- Champions: B-67 Nuuk (13th title)

The 2018 GrønlandsBANKEN GM was the 48th edition of the Greenlandic Football Championship. The final round was held in Nuuk from 12 to 19 August. It was won by B-67 Nuuk for the thirteenth time in its history.

== Qualifying stage ==
=== North Greenland ===
G-44 Qeqertarsuaq and Upernavik BK 83 qualified for the final Round. Disko-76, Eqaluk-56 and Terianniaq-58 failed to qualify. FC Malamuk and Umanak BK 68 withdrew before the tournament.

=== Disko Bay ===
Kugsak-45 and Nagdlunguaq-48 qualified for the final Round. Aqisseq Kangaatsiaq and Tupilak-41 failed to qualify.

=== Central Greenland ===
Pos	Team	Pld	W	D	L	GF	GA	GD	Pts	Qualification or relegation
1	B-67 Nuuk	4	4	0	0	20	0	+20	12	2018 GrønlandsBANKEN GM Final Round
2	Inuit Timersoqatigiiffiat-79	4	3	0	1	13	10	+3	9	2018 GrønlandsBANKEN GM Final Round
3	Nuuk IL	4	1	1	2	8	13	−5	4	2018 GrønlandsBANKEN GM Final Round
4	Kagssagssuk Maniitsoq	4	1	1	2	10	19	−9	4	2018 GrønlandsBANKEN GM Final Round
5	Siumut Amerdlok Kunuk	4	0	0	4	9	18	−9	0	
6	Grønlands Seminarius Sportklub	0	0	0	0	0	0	0	0	Withdrew

=== South Greenland ===
Pos	Team	Pld	W	D	L	GF	GA	GD	Pts	Qualification or relegation
1	Kissaviarsuk-33	2	2	0	0	17	6	+11	6	2018 GrønlandsBANKEN GM Final Round
2	Eqaluk-54	2	1	0	1	8	7	+1	3	2018 GrønlandsBANKEN GM Final Round
3	Narsaq-85	2	0	0	2	5	17	−12	0	

== Final Round ==
=== Pool 1 ===
Pos	Team	Pld	W	D	L	GF	GA	GD	Pts	Qualification or relegation
1	Nagdlunguaq-48	4	4	0	0	26	1	+25	12	2018 GrønlandsBANKEN GM Semi-finals
2	Nuuk IL	4	3	0	1	14	9	+5	9	2018 GrønlandsBANKEN GM Semi-finals
3	Upernavik BK 83	4	2	0	2	8	8	0	6	
4	Kagssagssuk Maniitsoq	4	1	0	3	7	17	−10	3	
5	Kugsak-45	4	0	0	4	6	26	−20	0	

12 August 2018

Nuuk IL	3–2	Upernavik BK 83

Nuuk Stadium, Nuuk
12 August 2018

Kugsak-45	3–5	Kagssagssuk Maniitsoq

Nuuk Stadium, Nuuk

13 August 2018

Upernavik BK 83	3–1	Kugsak-45

Nuuk Stadium, Nuuk
13 August 2018

Nuuk IL	0–4	Nagdlunguaq-48

Nuuk Stadium, Nuuk

14 August 2018

Kagssagssuk Maniitsoq	0–5	Nagdlunguaq-48

Nuuk Stadium, Nuuk
14 August 2018

Nuuk IL	5–1	Kugsak-45

Nuuk Stadium, Nuuk

15 August 2018

Upernavik BK 83	3–0	Kagssagssuk Maniitsoq

Nuuk Stadium, Nuuk
15 August 2018

Kugsak-45	1–13	Nagdlunguaq-48

Nuuk Stadium, Nuuk

16 August 2018

Upernavik BK 83	0–4	Nagdlunguaq-48

Nuuk Stadium, Nuuk
16 August 2018

Nuuk IL	6–2	Kagssagssuk Maniitsoq

Nuuk Stadium, Nuuk

=== Pool 2 ===
Pos	Team	Pld	W	D	L	GF	GA	GD	Pts	Qualification or relegation
1	B-67 Nuuk	4	4	0	0	29	2	+27	12	2018 GrønlandsBANKEN GM Semi-finals
2	Inuit Timersoqatigiiffiat-79	4	3	0	1	20	8	+12	9	2018 GrønlandsBANKEN GM Semi-finals
3	Kissaviarsuk-33	4	2	0	2	16	21	−5	6	
4	G-44 Qeqertarsuaq	4	1	0	3	11	24	−13	3	
5	Eqaluk-54	4	0	0	4	3	24	−21	0	

12 August 2018

G-44 Qeqertarsuaq	1–10	B-67 Nuuk

Nuuk Stadium, Nuuk
12 August 2018

Inuit Timersoqatigiiffiat-79	7–0	Kissaviarsuk-33

Nuuk Stadium, Nuuk

13 August 2018

G-44 Qeqertarsuaq	2–0	Eqaluk-54

Nuuk Stadium, Nuuk
13 August 2018

B-67 Nuuk	5–1	Inuit Timersoqatigiiffiat-79

Nuuk Stadium, Nuuk

14 August 2018

Kissaviarsuk-33	6–2	Eqaluk-54

Nuuk Stadium, Nuuk
14 August 2018

G-44 Qeqertarsuaq	2–4	Inuit Timersoqatigiiffiat-79

Nuuk Stadium, Nuuk

15 August 2018

B-67 Nuuk	6–0	Kissaviarsuk-33

Nuuk Stadium, Nuuk
15 August 2018

Inuit Timersoqatigiiffiat-79	8–1	Eqaluk-54

Nuuk Stadium, Nuuk

16 August 2018

G-44 Qeqertarsuaq	6–10	Kissaviarsuk-33

Nuuk Stadium, Nuuk
16 August 2018

B-67 Nuuk	8–0	Eqaluk-54

Nuuk Stadium, Nuuk

== Playoffs ==
=== Ninth-place match ===
18 August 2018

Kugsak-45	1–9	Eqaluk-54

Nuuk Stadium, Nuuk

=== Seventh-place match ===
18 August 2018

Kagssagssuk Maniitsoq	1–4	G-44 Qeqertarsuaq

Nuuk Stadium, Nuuk

=== Fifth-place match ===
19 August 2018

Upernavik BK 83	0–6	Kissaviarsuk-33

Nuuk Stadium, Nuuk

=== Semi-finals ===
18 August 2018

Nagdlunguaq-48	3–0	Inuit Timersoqatigiiffiat-79

Nuuk Stadium, Nuuk
18 August 2018

Nuuk IL	1–4	B-67 Nuuk

Nuuk Stadium, Nuuk

=== Third-place match ===
19 August 2018

Nuuk IL	1–3	Inuit Timersoqatigiiffiat-79

Nuuk Stadium, Nuuk

=== Final ===
19 August 2018

B-67 Nuuk	2–0	Nagdlunguaq-48

Nuuk Stadium, Nuuk

== See also ==
- Football in Greenland
- Football Association of Greenland
- Greenland national football team
- Greenlandic Men's Football Championship
