= 2020 Greenlandic Football Championship =

2020 GrønlandsBANKEN GM
- Season: 2020

The 2020 GrønlandsBANKEN GM was set to be the 50th edition of the Greenlandic Football Championship. The final round was to be started in Ilulissat on 10 August, however the tournament was cancelled due to the COVID-19 pandemic in Greenland.

== Qualifying stage ==
=== Avannaata ===
Pos	Team	Pld	W	D	L	GF	GA	GD	Pts	Qualification or relegation
1	FC Malamuk	2	2	0	0	11	5	+6	6	2020 GrønlandsBANKEN GM Final Round
2	Eqaluk-56	2	1	0	1	11	6	+5	3	
3	Amaroq-53	2	0	0	2	3	14	−11	0	

^{NB} Nagdlunguaq-48 qualified for the Final Round as hosts.

=== Qeqertalik ===
Pos	Team	Pld	W	D	L	GF	GA	GD	Pts	Qualification or relegation
1	G-44 Qeqertarsuaq	3	3	0	0	24	3	+21	9	2020 GrønlandsBANKEN GM Final Round
2	Aqisseq Kangaatsiaq	3	2	0	1	10	11	−1	6	2020 GrønlandsBANKEN GM Final Round
3	Tupilak-41	3	1	0	2	4	8	−4	3	
4	Disko-76	3	0	0	3	2	18	−16	0	
5	Kugsak-45	0	0	0	0	0	0	0	0	

^{NB} Kugsak-45 withdrew before the tournament.

=== Qeqqata ===
Pos	Team	Pld	W	D	L	GF	GA	GD	Pts	Qualification or relegation
1	Aqigssiaq Maniitsoq	2	2	0	0	8	1	+7	6	2020 GrønlandsBANKEN GM Final Round
2	Siumut Amerdlok Kunuk	2	1	0	1	5	3	+2	3	
3	Sisimiut-68	2	0	0	2	2	11	−9	0	

=== Sermersooq ===
B-67 Nuuk and Inuit Timersoqatigiiffiat-79 qualified for the Final Round.

=== Kujalleq ===
Pos	Team	Pld	W	D	L	GF	GA	GD	Pts	Qualification or relegation
1	Eqaluk-54	2	2	0	0	9	2	+7	6	2020 GrønlandsBANKEN GM Final Round
2	Kissaviarsuk-33	2	0	0	2	2	9	−7	0	

== Final Round ==
The Final Round was cancelled due to the COVID-19 pandemic in Greenland.

== See also ==
- Football in Greenland
- Football Association of Greenland
- Greenland national football team
- Greenlandic Men's Football Championship
