= 2016 Greenlandic Football Championship =

2016 Coca Cola GM
- Season: 2016
- Champions: B-67 Nuuk (12th title)

The 2016 Coca-Cola GM was the 46th edition of the Greenlandic Men's Football Championship. The final round was held in Nuuk from 7 to 14 August. It was won by B-67 Nuuk for the fifth consecutive time and for the twelfth time in its history.

== Qualifying stage ==
=== North Greenland ===
Pos	Team	Pld	W	D	L	GF	GA	GD	Pts	Qualification or relegation
1	FC Malamuk	2	2	0	0	9	2	+7	6	2016 Coca Cola GM Final Round
2	Ukaleq-55	2	0	1	1	3	5	−2	1	
3	Eqaluk-56	2	0	1	1	5	10	−5	1	

=== Disko Bay ===
Pos	Team	Pld	W	D	L	GF	GA	GD	Pts	Qualification or relegation
1	G-44 Qeqertarsuaq	3	2	1	0	-	-	—	7	2016 Coca Cola GM Final Round
2	Nagdlunguaq-48	3	2	0	1	-	-	—	6	2016 Coca Cola GM Final Round
3	Kugsak-45	3	1	1	1	-	-	—	4	
4	Tupilak-41	3	0	0	3	-	-	—	0	

^{NB} Some match results are unavailable.

=== Central Greenland ===
Kagssagssuk Maniitsoq qualified for the final Round.

=== Capital Region ===
All matches were played in Nuuk.

Pos	Team	Pld	W	D	L	GF	GA	GD	Pts	Qualification or relegation
1	B-67 Nuuk	2	2	0	0	24	1	+23	6	2016 Coca Cola GM Final Round
2	Nuuk IL	2	1	0	1	15	5	+10	3	
3	Grønlands Seminarius Sportklub	2	0	0	2	0	33	−33	0	

^{NB} Inuit Timersoqatigiiffiat-79 qualified for the final Round as hosts.

=== East Greenland ===
TM-62 qualified for the final Round.

=== South Greenland ===
Siuteroq Nanortalik-43 qualified for the final Round.

== Final round ==
=== Pool 1 ===
Pos	Team	Pld	W	D	L	GF	GA	GD	Pts	Qualification or relegation
1	Nagdlunguaq-48	3	3	0	0	17	0	+17	9	2016 Coca Cola GM Semi-finals
2	Inuit Timersoqatigiiffiat-79	3	2	0	1	16	7	+9	6	2016 Coca Cola GM Semi-finals
3	FC Malamuk	3	1	0	2	5	8	−3	3	2016 Coca Cola GM Fifth Place Match
4	TM-62	3	0	0	3	1	24	−23	0	2016 Coca Cola GM Seventh Place Match

7 August 2016

Inuit Timersoqatigiiffiat-79	11–0	TM-62

Nuuk Stadium, Nuuk
7 August 2016

FC Malamuk	0–2	Nagdlunguaq-48

Nuuk Stadium, Nuuk

9 August 2016

TM-62	0–10	Nagdlunguaq-48

Nuuk Stadium, Nuuk
9 August 2016

Inuit Timersoqatigiiffiat-79	5–2	FC Malamuk

Nuuk Stadium, Nuuk

10 August 2016

TM-62	1–3	FC Malamuk

Nuuk Stadium, Nuuk
10 August 2016

Inuit Timersoqatigiiffiat-79	0–5	Nagdlunguaq-48

Nuuk Stadium, Nuuk

=== Pool 2 ===
Pos	Team	Pld	W	D	L	GF	GA	GD	Pts	Qualification or relegation
1	B-67 Nuuk	3	3	0	0	8	0	+8	9	2016 Coca Cola GM Semi-finals
2	G-44 Qeqertarsuaq	3	2	0	1	7	4	+3	6	2016 Coca Cola GM Semi-finals
3	Siuteroq Nanortalik-43	3	1	0	2	3	6	−3	3	2016 Coca Cola GM Fifth Place Match
4	Kagssagssuk Maniitsoq	3	0	0	3	3	11	−8	0	2016 Coca Cola GM Seventh Place Match

7 August 2016

G-44 Qeqertarsuaq	0–2	B-67 Nuuk

Nuuk Stadium, Nuuk
7 August 2016

Siuteroq Nanortalik-43	3–1	Kagssagssuk Maniitsoq

Nuuk Stadium, Nuuk

9 August 2016

G-44 Qeqertarsuaq	1–0	Siuteroq Nanortalik-43

Nuuk Stadium, Nuuk
9 August 2016

B-67 Nuuk	2–0	Kagssagssuk Maniitsoq

Nuuk Stadium, Nuuk

10 August 2016

B-67 Nuuk	4–0	Siuteroq Nanortalik-43

Nuuk Stadium, Nuuk
10 August 2016

G-44 Qeqertarsuaq	6–2	Kagssagssuk Maniitsoq

Nuuk Stadium, Nuuk

== Playoffs ==
=== Seventh-place match ===
13 August 2016

TM-62	0–10	Kagssagssuk Maniitsoq

Nuuk Stadium, Nuuk

=== Fifth-place match ===
13 August 2016

FC Malamuk	1–2	Siuteroq Nanortalik-43

Nuuk Stadium, Nuuk

=== Semi-finals ===
12 August 2016

Nagdlunguaq-48	2–0	G-44 Qeqertarsuaq

Nuuk Stadium, Nuuk
12 August 2016

B-67 Nuuk	4–0	Inuit Timersoqatigiiffiat-79

Nuuk Stadium, Nuuk

=== Third-place match ===
14 August 2016

G-44 Qeqertarsuaq	1–6	Inuit Timersoqatigiiffiat-79

Nuuk Stadium, Nuuk

=== Final ===
14 August 2016

Nagdlunguaq-48	1–3	B-67 Nuuk

Nuuk Stadium, Nuuk

== See also ==
- Football in Greenland
- Football Association of Greenland
- Greenland national football team
- Greenlandic Men's Football Championship
