= 2006 Greenlandic Men's Football Championship =

2006 Coca Cola GM
- Season: 2006
- Champions: Nagdlunguaq-48 (9th title)

The 2006 Coca-Cola GM was the 36th edition of the Greenlandic Men's Football Championship. The final round was held in Sisimiut from 7 to 12 August. It was won by Nagdlunguaq-48 for the ninth time in its history.

== Qualifying stage ==
=== North Greenland ===
Pos	Team	Pld	W	D	L	GF	GA	GD	Pts	Qualification or relegation
1	FC Malamuk	4	3	1	0	15	5	+10	10	2006 Coca Cola GM Final Round
2	Umanak BK 68	4	2	1	1	15	5	+10	7	
3	Eqaluk-56	4	2	1	1	14	8	+6	7	
4	Kingmeq-45	4	1	1	2	5	9	−4	4	
5	Ukaleq-55	4	0	0	4	3	25	−22	0	

=== Disko Bay ===
Nagdlunguaq-48 and G-44 Qeqertarsuaq qualified for the final Round.

=== Central Greenland ===
B-67 Nuuk qualified for the final Round.

^{NB} Siumut Amerdlok Kunuk qualified for the final Round as hosts.

=== East Greenland ===
A.T.A.-60 qualified for the final Round.

=== South Greenland ===
Narsaq-85 and Kissaviarsuk-33 qualified for the final Round.

== Final round ==
=== Pool 1 ===
Pos	Team	Pld	W	D	L	GF	GA	GD	Pts	Qualification or relegation
1	B-67 Nuuk	3	2	1	0	8	1	+7	7	2006 Coca Cola GM Semi-finals
2	Nagdlunguaq-48	3	1	1	1	3	7	−4	4	2006 Coca Cola GM Semi-finals
3	G-44 Qeqertarsuaq	3	0	2	1	2	3	−1	2	
4	Siumut Amerdlok Kunuk	3	0	2	1	3	5	−2	2	

7 August 2006

G-44 Qeqertarsuaq	1–1	Siumut Amerdlok Kunuk

Sisimiut Stadium, Sisimiut
7 August 2006

B-67 Nuuk	5–0	Nagdlunguaq-48

Sisimiut Stadium, Sisimiut

8 August 2006

B-67 Nuuk	0–0	G-44 Qeqertarsuaq

Sisimiut Stadium, Sisimiut
8 August 2006

Nagdlunguaq-48	1–1	Siumut Amerdlok Kunuk

Sisimiut Stadium, Sisimiut

9 August 2006

Nagdlunguaq-48	2–1	G-44 Qeqertarsuaq

Sisimiut Stadium, Sisimiut
9 August 2006

B-67 Nuuk	3–1	Siumut Amerdlok Kunuk

Sisimiut Stadium, Sisimiut

=== Pool 2 ===
Pos	Team	Pld	W	D	L	GF	GA	GD	Pts	Qualification or relegation
1	A.T.A.-60	3	3	0	0	14	6	+8	9	2006 Coca Cola GM Semi-finals
2	Narsaq-85	3	1	1	1	9	11	−2	4	2006 Coca Cola GM Semi-finals
3	Kissaviarsuk-33	3	1	0	2	6	8	−2	3	
4	FC Malamuk	3	0	1	2	3	7	−4	1	

7 August 2006

FC Malamuk	1–1	Narsaq-85

Sisimiut Stadium, Sisimiut
7 August 2006

A.T.A.-60	3–1	Kissaviarsuk-33

Sisimiut Stadium, Sisimiut

8 August 2006

Narsaq-85	4–2	Kissaviarsuk-33

Sisimiut Stadium, Sisimiut
8 August 2006

A.T.A.-60	3–1	FC Malamuk

Sisimiut Stadium, Sisimiut

9 August 2006

A.T.A.-60	8–4	Narsaq-85

Sisimiut Stadium, Sisimiut
9 August 2006

Kissaviarsuk-33	3–1	FC Malamuk

Sisimiut Stadium, Sisimiut

== Playoffs ==
=== Semi-finals ===
10 August 2006

G-44 Qeqertarsuaq	3–1	FC Malamuk

Sisimiut Stadium, Sisimiut
10 August 2006

Kissaviarsuk-33	3–1 (a.e.t.)	Siumut Amerdlok Kunuk

Sisimiut Stadium, Sisimiut

11 August 2006

Nagdlunguaq-48	2–1	A.T.A.-60

Sisimiut Stadium, Sisimiut
11 August 2006

Narsaq-85	5–4	B-67 Nuuk

Sisimiut Stadium, Sisimiut

=== Seventh-place match ===
11 August 2006

Siumut Amerdlok Kunuk	4–1	FC Malamuk

Sisimiut Stadium, Sisimiut

=== Fifth-place match ===
11 August 2006

G-44 Qeqertarsuaq	3–2	Kissaviarsuk-33

Sisimiut Stadium, Sisimiut

=== Third place match ===
12 August 2006

A.T.A.-60	2–3 (a.e.t.)	B-67 Nuuk

Sisimiut Stadium, Sisimiut

=== Final ===
12 August 2006

Nagdlunguaq-48	4–2	Narsaq-85

Sisimiut Stadium, Sisimiut

== See also ==
- Football in Greenland
- Football Association of Greenland
- Greenland national football team
- Greenlandic Men's Football Championship
