= 2005 Greenlandic Men's Football Championship =

2005 Coca Cola GM
- Season: 2005
- Champions: B-67 Nuuk (5th title)

The 2005 Coca-Cola GM was the 35th edition of the Greenlandic Men's Football Championship. The final round was held in Uummannaq from 25 to 30 August. It was won by B-67 Nuuk for the fifth time in its history.

== Qualifying stage ==
=== North Greenland ===
Umanak BK 68 and Eqaluk-56 qualified for the final Round.

^{NB} FC Malamuk qualified for the final Round as hosts.

=== Disko Bay ===
Nagdlunguaq-48, G-44 Qeqertarsuaq and Aasiak-97 qualified for the final Round.

=== Central Greenland ===
B-67 Nuuk and Kagssagssuk Maniitsoq qualified for the final Round.

== Final round ==
=== Pool 1 ===
Pos	Team	Pld	W	D	L	GF	GA	GD	Pts	Qualification or relegation
1	B-67 Nuuk	3	3	0	0	9	1	+8	9	2005 Coca Cola GM Semi-finals
2	FC Malamuk	3	2	0	1	4	4	0	6	2005 Coca Cola GM Semi-finals
3	Aasiak-97	3	1	0	2	6	6	0	3	2005 Coca Cola GM Fifth Place Match
4	Kagssagssuk Maniitsoq	3	0	0	3	1	9	−8	0	2005 Coca Cola GM Seventh Place Match

25 August 2005

Aasiak-97	1–3	FC Malamuk

Uummannaq Stadium, Uummannaq
25 August 2005

B-67 Nuuk	4–0	Kagssagssuk Maniitsoq

Uummannaq Stadium, Uummannaq

26 August 2005

FC Malamuk	1–0	Kagssagssuk Maniitsoq

Uummannaq Stadium, Uummannaq
26 August 2005

Aasiak-97	1–2	B-67 Nuuk

Uummannaq Stadium, Uummannaq

27 August 2005

FC Malamuk	0–3	B-67 Nuuk

Uummannaq Stadium, Uummannaq
27 August 2005

Aasiak-97	4–1	Kagssagssuk Maniitsoq

Uummannaq Stadium, Uummannaq

=== Pool 2 ===
Pos	Team	Pld	W	D	L	GF	GA	GD	Pts	Qualification or relegation
1	Nagdlunguaq-48	3	3	0	0	14	5	+9	9	2005 Coca Cola GM Semi-finals
2	G-44 Qeqertarsuaq	3	1	1	1	12	6	+6	4	2005 Coca Cola GM Semi-finals
3	Umanak BK 68	3	1	1	1	7	9	−2	4	2005 Coca Cola GM Fifth Place Match
4	Eqaluk-56	3	0	0	3	4	17	−13	0	2005 Coca Cola GM Seventh Place Match

25 August 2005

Nagdlunguaq-48	8–3	Umanak BK 68

Uummannaq Stadium, Uummannaq
25 August 2005

G-44 Qeqertarsuaq	10–3	Eqaluk-56

Uummannaq Stadium, Uummannaq

26 August 2005

Eqaluk-56	0–3	Umanak BK 68

Uummannaq Stadium, Uummannaq
26 August 2005

G-44 Qeqertarsuaq	1–2	Nagdlunguaq-48

Uummannaq Stadium, Uummannaq

27 August 2005

Eqaluk-56	1–4	Nagdlunguaq-48

Uummannaq Stadium, Uummannaq
27 August 2005

G-44 Qeqertarsuaq	1–1	Umanak BK 68

Uummannaq Stadium, Uummannaq

== Playoffs ==
=== Semi-finals ===
29 August 2005

B-67 Nuuk	2–1	G-44 Qeqertarsuaq

Uummannaq Stadium, Uummannaq
29 August 2005

FC Malamuk	1–3	Nagdlunguaq-48

Uummannaq Stadium, Uummannaq

=== Seventh-place match ===
29 August 2005

Kagssagssuk Maniitsoq	7–3	Eqaluk-56

Uummannaq Stadium, Uummannaq

=== Fifth-place match ===
29 August 2005

Aasiak-97	2–3	Umanak BK 68

Uummannaq Stadium, Uummannaq

=== Third-place match ===
30 August 2005

G-44 Qeqertarsuaq	2–4	FC Malamuk

Uummannaq Stadium, Uummannaq

=== Final ===
30 August 2005

B-67 Nuuk	3–1	Nagdlunguaq-48

Uummannaq Stadium, Uummannaq

== See also ==
- Football in Greenland
- Football Association of Greenland
- Greenland national football team
- Greenlandic Men's Football Championship
