= 2000 Greenlandic Men's Football Championship =

2000 Coca Cola GM
- Season: 2000
- Champions: Nagdlunguaq-48 (7th title)

The 2000 Coca-Cola GM was the 30th edition of the Greenlandic Men's Football Championship. The final round was held in Qasigiannguit. It was won by Nagdlunguaq-48 for the seventh time in its history.

== Qualifying stage ==
=== North Greenland ===
Pos	Team	Pld	W	D	L	GF	GA	GD	Pts	Qualification or relegation
1	FC Malamuk	2	2	0	0	7	2	+5	6	2000 Coca Cola GM Final Round
2	Upernavik BK 83	2	1	0	1	3	5	−2	3	
3	Umanak BK 68	2	0	0	2	2	5	−3	0	

=== Disko Bay ===
Pos	Team	Pld	W	D	L	GF	GA	GD	Pts	Qualification or relegation
1	Nagdlunguaq-48	3	3	0	0	9	2	+7	9	2000 Coca Cola GM Final Round
2	Kugsak-45	3	2	0	1	12	5	+7	6	2000 Coca Cola GM Final Round
3	Disko-76	3	1	0	2	3	10	−7	3	
4	Ilulissat-69	3	0	0	3	2	9	−7	0	

=== Central Greenland ===
Pos	Team	Pld	W	D	L	GF	GA	GD	Pts	Qualification or relegation
1	Nuuk IL	4	4	0	0	20	1	+19	12	2000 Coca Cola GM Final Round
2	Siumut Amerdlok Kunuk	4	3	0	1	16	6	+10	9	2000 Coca Cola GM Final Round
3	Kagssagssuk Maniitsoq	4	2	0	2	11	14	−3	6	2000 Coca Cola GM Final Round
4	Nuuk IL B	4	1	0	3	8	13	−5	3	
5	Nagtoralik Paamiut	4	0	0	4	4	25	−21	0	

=== South Greenland ===
Pos	Team	Pld	W	D	L	GF	GA	GD	Pts	Qualification or relegation
1	Kissaviarsuk-33	3	3	0	0	15	3	+12	9	2000 Coca Cola GM Final Round
2	Siuteroq Nanortalik-43	3	1	1	1	11	11	0	4	2000 South Greenland Playoff
3	Narsaq-85	3	1	1	1	10	10	0	4	2000 South Greenland Playoff
4	QAA-Qaqortoq	3	0	0	3	6	18	−12	0	

==== Playoff ====
Siuteroq Nanortalik-43	3–2	Narsaq-85

Narsaq-85	1–2	Siuteroq Nanortalik-43

Siuteroq Nanortalik-43 qualified for the final Round.

== Final round ==
=== Pool 1 ===
Pos	Team	Pld	W	D	L	GF	GA	GD	Pts	Qualification or relegation
1	Nagdlunguaq-48	3	3	0	0	18	1	+17	9	2000 Coca Cola GM Semi-finals
2	Kissaviarsuk-33	3	2	0	1	10	6	+4	6	2000 Coca Cola GM Semi-finals
3	Nuuk IL	3	1	0	2	10	7	+3	3	2000 Coca Cola GM Fifth Place Match
4	Siuteroq Nanortalik-43	3	0	0	3	2	26	−24	0	2000 Coca Cola GM Seventh Place Match

Nagdlunguaq-48	10–0	Siuteroq Nanortalik-43

Qasigiannguit Stadium, Qasigiannguit

Kissaviarsuk-33	2–1	Nuuk IL

Qasigiannguit Stadium, Qasigiannguit

Nagdlunguaq-48	4–0	Kissaviarsuk-33

Qasigiannguit Stadium, Qasigiannguit

Siuteroq Nanortalik-43	1–8	Nuuk IL

Qasigiannguit Stadium, Qasigiannguit

Nagdlunguaq-48	4–1	Nuuk IL

Qasigiannguit Stadium, Qasigiannguit

Siuteroq Nanortalik-43	1–8	Kissaviarsuk-33

Qasigiannguit Stadium, Qasigiannguit

=== Pool 2 ===
Pos	Team	Pld	W	D	L	GF	GA	GD	Pts	Qualification or relegation
1	Kugsak-45	3	2	0	1	11	5	+6	6	2000 Coca Cola GM Semi-finals
2	Siumut Amerdlok Kunuk	3	1	2	0	5	4	+1	5	2000 Coca Cola GM Semi-finals
3	FC Malamuk	3	1	1	1	7	7	0	4	2000 Coca Cola GM Fifth Place Match
4	Kagssagssuk Maniitsoq	3	0	1	2	4	11	−7	1	2000 Coca Cola GM Seventh Place Match

Kagssagssuk Maniitsoq	3–5	Kugsak-45

Qasigiannguit Stadium, Qasigiannguit

FC Malamuk	2–2	Siumut Amerdlok Kunuk

Qasigiannguit Stadium, Qasigiannguit

Kagssagssuk Maniitsoq	0–5	FC Malamuk

Qasigiannguit Stadium, Qasigiannguit

Kugsak-45	1–2	Siumut Amerdlok Kunuk

Qasigiannguit Stadium, Qasigiannguit

Kagssagssuk Maniitsoq	1–1	Siumut Amerdlok Kunuk

Qasigiannguit Stadium, Qasigiannguit

FC Malamuk	0–5	Kugsak-45

Qasigiannguit Stadium, Qasigiannguit

== Playoffs ==
=== Semi-finals ===
Nagdlunguaq-48	2–0	Siumut Amerdlok Kunuk

Qasigiannguit Stadium, Qasigiannguit

Kugsak-45	6–1	Kissaviarsuk-33

Qasigiannguit Stadium, Qasigiannguit

=== Seventh-place match ===
Siuteroq Nanortalik-43	4–5	Kagssagssuk Maniitsoq

Qasigiannguit Stadium, Qasigiannguit

=== Fifth-place match ===
FC Malamuk	w/o	Nuuk IL

Qasigiannguit Stadium, Qasigiannguit

=== Third-place match ===
Siumut Amerdlok Kunuk	2–1	Kissaviarsuk-33

Qasigiannguit Stadium, Qasigiannguit

=== Final ===
Nagdlunguaq-48	1–0	Kugsak-45

Qasigiannguit Stadium, Qasigiannguit

== See also ==
- Football in Greenland
- Football Association of Greenland
- Greenland national football team
- Greenlandic Men's Football Championship
