= 2017 Greenlandic Football Championship =

2017 Coca Cola GM
- Season: 2017
- Champions: Inuit Timersoqatigiiffiat-79 (1st title)

The 2017 Coca-Cola GM was the 47th edition of the Greenlandic Men's Football Championship. The final round was held in Qeqertarsuaq from 5 to 12 August. It was won by Inuit Timersoqatigiiffiat-79 for the first time.

== Qualifying stage ==
=== North Greenland ===
Terianniaq-58 qualified for the final Round.

=== Disko Bay ===
Pos	Team	Pld	W	D	L	GF	GA	GD	Pts	Qualification or relegation
1	Kugsak-45	3	2	0	1	10	5	+5	6	2017 Coca Cola GM Final Round
2	Nagdlunguaq-48	3	2	0	1	7	3	+4	6	2017 Coca Cola GM Final Round
3	Kangaatsiaq Ippernaq-53	3	1	0	2	4	7	−3	3	
4	Tupilak-41	3	1	0	2	4	10	−6	3	

^{NB} G-44 Qeqertarsuaq qualified for the final Round as hosts.

=== Central Greenland ===
Pos	Team	Pld	W	D	L	GF	GA	GD	Pts	Qualification or relegation
1	B-67 Nuuk	4	3	1	0	26	5	+21	10	2017 Coca Cola GM Final Round
2	Inuit Timersoqatigiiffiat-79	4	3	0	1	17	8	+9	9	2017 Coca Cola GM Final Round
3	Kagssagssuk Maniitsoq	4	2	0	2	20	13	+7	6	Selected to replace East Greenland's qualifier
4	Nuuk IL	4	1	1	2	13	6	+7	4	
5	Sisimiut-68	4	0	0	4	4	48	−44	0	

=== East Greenland ===
^{NB} East Greenland's winner withdrew and were replaced by Kagssagssuk Maniitsoq (Central Greenland third place).

=== South Greenland ===
Kissaviarsuk-33 qualified for the final Round, but were banned and replaced by runners-up Siuteroq Nanortalik-43.

== Final Round ==
=== Pool 1 ===
Pos	Team	Pld	W	D	L	GF	GA	GD	Pts	Qualification or relegation
1	B-67 Nuuk	3	3	0	0	9	1	+8	9	2017 Coca Cola GM Semi-finals
2	Inuit Timersoqatigiiffiat-79	3	1	1	1	11	5	+6	4	2017 Coca Cola GM Semi-finals
3	Kugsak-45	3	1	1	1	7	5	+2	4	
4	Siuteroq Nanortalik-43	3	0	0	3	1	17	−16	0	

6 August 2017

B-67 Nuuk	1–0	Inuit Timersoqatigiiffiat-79

Qeqertarsuaq Stadium, Qeqertarsuaq
6 August 2017

Kugsak-45	3–0	Siuteroq Nanortalik-43

Qeqertarsuaq Stadium, Qeqertarsuaq

7 August 2017

Kugsak-45	1–2	B-67 Nuuk

Qeqertarsuaq Stadium, Qeqertarsuaq
7 August 2017

Inuit Timersoqatigiiffiat-79	8–1	Siuteroq Nanortalik-43

Qeqertarsuaq Stadium, Qeqertarsuaq

8 August 2017

Kugsak-45	3–3	Inuit Timersoqatigiiffiat-79

Qeqertarsuaq Stadium, Qeqertarsuaq
8 August 2017

B-67 Nuuk	6–0	Siuteroq Nanortalik-43

Qeqertarsuaq Stadium, Qeqertarsuaq

=== Pool 2 ===
Pos	Team	Pld	W	D	L	GF	GA	GD	Pts	Qualification or relegation
1	Nagdlunguaq-48	3	2	1	0	25	7	+18	7	2017 Coca Cola GM Semi-finals
2	G-44 Qeqertarsuaq	3	2	1	0	12	4	+8	7	2017 Coca Cola GM Semi-finals
3	Kagssagssuk Maniitsoq	3	1	0	2	8	16	−8	3	
4	Terianniaq-58	3	0	0	3	4	22	−18	0	

5 August 2017

G-44 Qeqertarsuaq	5–0	Terianniaq-58

Qeqertarsuaq Stadium, Qeqertarsuaq
5 August 2017

Kagssagssuk Maniitsoq	3–9	Nagdlunguaq-48

Qeqertarsuaq Stadium, Qeqertarsuaq

6 August 2017

G-44 Qeqertarsuaq	3–0	Kagssagssuk Maniitsoq

Qeqertarsuaq Stadium, Qeqertarsuaq
6 August 2017

Terianniaq-58	0–12	Nagdlunguaq-48

Qeqertarsuaq Stadium, Qeqertarsuaq

8 August 2017

G-44 Qeqertarsuaq	4–4	Nagdlunguaq-48

Qeqertarsuaq Stadium, Qeqertarsuaq
8 August 2017

Terianniaq-58	4–5	Kagssagssuk Maniitsoq

Qeqertarsuaq Stadium, Qeqertarsuaq

== Playoffs ==
=== Seventh-place match ===
11 August 2017

Siuteroq Nanortalik-43	8–2	Terianniaq-58

Qeqertarsuaq Stadium, Qeqertarsuaq

=== Fifth-place match ===
11 August 2017

Kugsak-45	1–0	Kagssagssuk Maniitsoq

Qeqertarsuaq Stadium, Qeqertarsuaq

=== Semi-finals ===
10 August 2017

B-67 Nuuk	2–1	G-44 Qeqertarsuaq

Qeqertarsuaq Stadium, Qeqertarsuaq
10 August 2017

Nagdlunguaq-48	3–4 (a.e.t.)	Inuit Timersoqatigiiffiat-79

Qeqertarsuaq Stadium, Qeqertarsuaq

=== Third place Match ===
12 August 2017

Nagdlunguaq-48	1–2	G-44 Qeqertarsuaq

Qeqertarsuaq Stadium, Qeqertarsuaq

=== Final ===
12 August 2017

B-67 Nuuk	2–2 (a.e.t.)	Inuit Timersoqatigiiffiat-79
Penalties
	2–4

Qeqertarsuaq Stadium, Qeqertarsuaq

== See also ==
- Football in Greenland
- Football Association of Greenland
- Greenland national football team
- Greenlandic Men's Football Championship
