= 2008 Greenlandic Men's Football Championship =

2008 Coca Cola GM
- Season: 2008
- Champions: B-67 Nuuk (6th title)

The 2008 Coca-Cola GM was the 38th edition of the Greenlandic Men's Football Championship. The final round was held in Qaqortoq from 21 to 25 August. It was won by B-67 Nuuk for the sixth time in its history.

== Qualifying stage ==
=== North Greenland ===
FC Malamuk and Eqaluk-56 qualified for the final Round.

=== Disko Bay ===
Nagdlunguaq-48 and Kugsak-45 qualified for the final Round.

=== Central Greenland ===
Pos	Team	Pld	W	D	L	GF	GA	GD	Pts	Qualification or relegation
1	Siumut Amerdlok Kunuk	4	3	1	0	18	7	+11	10	2008 Coca Cola GM Final Round
2	B-67 Nuuk	4	2	1	1	11	5	+6	7	2008 Coca Cola GM Final Round
3	Kagssagssuk Maniitsoq	4	2	0	2	6	12	−6	6	
4	Nuuk IL	4	1	2	1	9	9	0	5	
5	Sisimiut-68	4	0	0	4	4	15	−11	0	

^{NB} Some match results are unavailable.

=== South Greenland ===
Eqaluk-54 qualified for the final Round.

^{NB} Kissaviarsuk-33 qualified for the final Round as hosts.

== Final round ==
=== Pool 1 ===
Pos	Team	Pld	W	D	L	GF	GA	GD	Pts	Qualification or relegation
1	Nagdlunguaq-48	3	3	0	0	10	5	+5	9	2008 Coca Cola GM Semi-finals
2	FC Malamuk	3	1	1	1	1	2	−1	4	2008 Coca Cola GM Semi-finals
3	Siumut Amerdlok Kunuk	3	1	0	2	5	7	−2	3	2008 Coca Cola GM Fifth Place Match
4	Kugsak-45	3	0	1	2	3	5	−2	1	2008 Coca Cola GM Seventh Place Match

10 August 2008

Siumut Amerdlok Kunuk	3–5	Nagdlunguaq-48

Qaqortoq Stadium, Qaqortoq
10 August 2008

Kugsak-45	0–0	FC Malamuk

Qaqortoq Stadium, Qaqortoq

11 August 2008

Siumut Amerdlok Kunuk	2–1	Kugsak-45

Qaqortoq Stadium, Qaqortoq
11 August 2008

Nagdlunguaq-48	2–0	FC Malamuk

Qaqortoq Stadium, Qaqortoq

12 August 2008

Siumut Amerdlok Kunuk	0–1	FC Malamuk

Qaqortoq Stadium, Qaqortoq
12 August 2008

Nagdlunguaq-48	3–2	Kugsak-45

Qaqortoq Stadium, Qaqortoq

=== Pool 2 ===
Pos	Team	Pld	W	D	L	GF	GA	GD	Pts	Qualification or relegation
1	B-67 Nuuk	3	2	1	0	5	3	+2	7	2008 Coca Cola GM Semi-finals
2	Kissaviarsuk-33	3	1	2	0	8	7	+1	5	2008 Coca Cola GM Semi-finals
3	Eqaluk-56	3	1	1	1	8	6	+2	4	2008 Coca Cola GM Fifth Place Match
4	Eqaluk-54	3	0	0	3	5	10	−5	0	2008 Coca Cola GM Seventh Place Match

10 August 2008

B-67 Nuuk	2–2	Kissaviarsuk-33

Qaqortoq Stadium, Qaqortoq
10 August 2008

Eqaluk-54	2–5	Eqaluk-56

Qaqortoq Stadium, Qaqortoq

11 August 2008

Kissaviarsuk-33	4–3	Eqaluk-54

Qaqortoq Stadium, Qaqortoq
11 August 2008

B-67 Nuuk	2–1	Eqaluk-56

Qaqortoq Stadium, Qaqortoq

12 August 2008

Kissaviarsuk-33	2–2	Eqaluk-56

Qaqortoq Stadium, Qaqortoq
12 August 2008

Eqaluk-54	0–1	B-67 Nuuk

Qaqortoq Stadium, Qaqortoq

== Playoffs ==
=== Semi-finals ===
14 August 2008

Nagdlunguaq-48	2–3	Kissaviarsuk-33

Qaqortoq Stadium, Qaqortoq
14 August 2008

B-67 Nuuk	2–0	FC Malamuk

Qaqortoq Stadium, Qaqortoq

=== Seventh-place match ===
14 August 2008

Kugsak-45	3–1	Eqaluk-54

Qaqortoq Stadium, Qaqortoq

=== Fifth-place match ===
14 August 2008

Siumut Amerdlok Kunuk	1–3	Eqaluk-56

Qaqortoq Stadium, Qaqortoq

=== Third-place match ===
15 August 2008

Nagdlunguaq-48	6–1	FC Malamuk

Qaqortoq Stadium, Qaqortoq

=== Final ===
15 August 2008

B-67 Nuuk	1–0	Kissaviarsuk-33

Qaqortoq Stadium, Qaqortoq

== See also ==
- Football in Greenland
- Football Association of Greenland
- Greenland national football team
- Greenlandic Men's Football Championship
