= 1994 Greenlandic Men's Football Championship =

- Season: 1994
- Champions: B-67 Nuuk (2nd title)

The 1994 Greenlandic Men's Football Championship was the 24th edition of the Greenlandic Men's Football Championship. The final round was held in Nuuk. It was won by B-67 Nuuk for the second time in its history.

== Final round ==
=== Pool 1 ===
Pos	Team	Pld	W	D	L	GF	GA	GD	Pts	Qualification or relegation
1	B-67 Nuuk	2	1	0	1	10	5	+5	3	1994 Greenlandic Men's Football Championship Semi-finals
2	Aqigssiaq Maniitsoq	2	1	0	1	5	4	+1	3	1994 Greenlandic Men's Football Championship Semi-finals
3	FC Malamuk	2	1	0	1	5	11	−6	3	1994 Greenlandic Men's Football Championship Fifth Place Match

FC Malamuk	3–2	Aqigssiaq Maniitsoq

Nuuk Stadium, Nuuk

B-67 Nuuk	9–2	FC Malamuk

Nuuk Stadium, Nuuk

Aqigssiaq Maniitsoq	3–1	B-67 Nuuk

Nuuk Stadium, Nuuk

=== Pool 2 ===
Pos	Team	Pld	W	D	L	GF	GA	GD	Pts	Qualification or relegation
1	Nuuk IL	2	1	1	0	7	6	+1	3	1994 Greenlandic Men's Football Championship Semi-finals
2	Kugsak-45	2	0	2	0	5	5	0	2	1994 Greenlandic Men's Football Championship Semi-finals
3	Kissaviarsuk-33	2	0	1	1	3	4	−1	1	1994 Greenlandic Men's Football Championship Fifth Place Match

Nuuk IL	3–2	Kissaviarsuk-33

Nuuk Stadium, Nuuk

Nuuk IL	4–4	Kugsak-45

Nuuk Stadium, Nuuk

Kissaviarsuk-33	1–1	Kugsak-45

Nuuk Stadium, Nuuk

== Playoffs ==
=== Semi-finals ===
B-67 Nuuk	1–0	Kugsak-45

Nuuk Stadium, Nuuk

Nuuk IL	1–2	Aqigssiaq Maniitsoq

Nuuk Stadium, Nuuk

=== Fifth-place match ===
FC Malamuk	3–8	Kissaviarsuk-33

Nuuk Stadium, Nuuk

=== Third-place match ===
Nuuk IL	4–1	Kugsak-45

Nuuk Stadium, Nuuk

=== Final ===
B-67 Nuuk	2–0	Aqigssiaq Maniitsoq

Nuuk Stadium, Nuuk

== See also ==
- Football in Greenland
- Football Association of Greenland
- Greenland national football team
- Greenlandic Men's Football Championship
