= 1982 Greenlandic Men's Football Championship =

- Season: 1982
- Champions: Nagdlunguaq-48 (4th title)

The 1982 Greenlandic Men's Football Championship was the 12th edition of the Greenlandic Men's Football Championship. The final round was held in Nuuk. It was won by Nagdlunguaq-48 for the fourth time in its history.

== Final round ==
=== Pool 1 ===
Pos	Team	Pld	W	D	L	GF	GA	GD	Pts	Qualification or relegation
1	B-67 Nuuk	2	1	1	0	5	4	+1	3	1982 Greenlandic Men's Football Championship Semi-finals
2	Siumut Amerdlok Kunuk	2	0	2	0	5	5	0	2	1982 Greenlandic Men's Football Championship Semi-finals
3	Kagssagssuk Maniitsoq	2	0	1	1	5	6	−1	1	

B-67 Nuuk	3–2	Kagssagssuk Maniitsoq

Nuuk Stadium, Nuuk

B-67 Nuuk	2–2	Siumut Amerdlok Kunuk

Nuuk Stadium, Nuuk

Kagssagssuk Maniitsoq	3–3	Siumut Amerdlok Kunuk

Nuuk Stadium, Nuuk

=== Pool 2 ===
Pos	Team	Pld	W	D	L	GF	GA	GD	Pts	Qualification or relegation
1	Nagdlunguaq-48	2	2	0	0	7	3	+4	4	1982 Greenlandic Men's Football Championship Semi-finals
2	Umanak BK 68	2	1	0	1	4	5	−1	2	1982 Greenlandic Men's Football Championship Semi-finals
3	Nuuk IL	2	0	0	2	4	7	−3	0	

Nagdlunguaq-48	4–2	Nuuk IL

Nuuk Stadium, Nuuk

Nagdlunguaq-48	3–1	Umanak BK 68

Nuuk Stadium, Nuuk

Nuuk IL	2–3	Umanak BK 68

Nuuk Stadium, Nuuk

== Playoffs ==
=== Semi-finals ===
B-67 Nuuk	2–4	Umanak BK 68

Nuuk Stadium, Nuuk

Nagdlunguaq-48	4–3	Siumut Amerdlok Kunuk

Nuuk Stadium, Nuuk

=== Third place match ===
B-67 Nuuk	6–1	Siumut Amerdlok Kunuk

Nuuk Stadium, Nuuk

=== Final ===
15 August 1982

Nagdlunguaq-48	5–0	Umanak BK 68

Nuuk Stadium, Nuuk

== See also ==
- Football in Greenland
- Football Association of Greenland
- Greenland national football team
- Greenlandic Men's Football Championship
