= 1996 Greenlandic Men's Football Championship =

- Season: 1996
- Champions: B-67 Nuuk (3rd title)

The 1996 Greenlandic Men's Football Championship was the 26th edition of the Greenlandic Men's Football Championship. The final round was held in Nuuk. It was won by B-67 Nuuk for the third time in its history.

== Final round ==
=== Pool 1 ===
Pos	Team	Pld	W	D	L	GF	GA	GD	Pts	Qualification or relegation
1	Nuuk IL	3	3	0	0	15	4	+11	9	1996 Greenlandic Men's Football Championship Semi-finals
2	Disko-76	3	2	0	1	9	5	+4	6	1996 Greenlandic Men's Football Championship Semi-finals
3	A.T.A.-60	3	1	0	2	8	11	−3	3	1996 Greenlandic Men's Football Championship Fifth Place Match
4	Nagtoralik Paamiut	3	0	0	3	4	16	−12	0	1996 Greenlandic Men's Football Championship Seventh Place Match

26 August 1996

A.T.A.-60	2–4	Disko-76

Nuuk Stadium, Nuuk
26 August 1996

Nagtoralik Paamiut	1–8	Nuuk IL

Nuuk Stadium, Nuuk

27 August 1996

A.T.A.-60	4–3	Nagtoralik Paamiut

Nuuk Stadium, Nuuk
27 August 1996

Disko-76	1–3	Nuuk IL

Nuuk Stadium, Nuuk

28 August 1996

A.T.A.-60	2–4	Nuuk IL

Nuuk Stadium, Nuuk
28 August 1996

Disko-76	4–0	Nagtoralik Paamiut

Nuuk Stadium, Nuuk

=== Pool 2 ===
Pos	Team	Pld	W	D	L	GF	GA	GD	Pts	Qualification or relegation
1	B-67 Nuuk	3	3	0	0	13	4	+9	9	1996 Greenlandic Men's Football Championship Semi-finals
2	Kugsak-45	3	2	0	1	8	6	+2	6	1996 Greenlandic Men's Football Championship Semi-finals
3	Kissaviarsuk-33	3	1	0	2	9	9	0	3	1996 Greenlandic Men's Football Championship Fifth Place Match
4	Nagdlunguaq-48	3	0	0	3	3	14	−11	0	1996 Greenlandic Men's Football Championship Seventh Place Match

26 August 1996

Nagdlunguaq-48	1–5	B-67 Nuuk

Nuuk Stadium, Nuuk
26 August 1996

Kissaviarsuk-33	2–3	Kugsak-45

Nuuk Stadium, Nuuk

27 August 1996

Nagdlunguaq-48	1–4	Kissaviarsuk-33

Nuuk Stadium, Nuuk
27 August 1996

B-67 Nuuk	3–0	Kugsak-45

Nuuk Stadium, Nuuk

28 August 1996

Nagdlunguaq-48	1–5	Kugsak-45

Nuuk Stadium, Nuuk
28 August 1996

B-67 Nuuk	5–3	Kissaviarsuk-33

Nuuk Stadium, Nuuk

== Playoffs ==
=== Semi-finals ===
30 August 1996

Nuuk IL	0–2	Kugsak-45

Nuuk Stadium, Nuuk
30 August 1996

B-67 Nuuk	7–0	Disko-76

Nuuk Stadium, Nuuk

=== Seventh-place match ===
31 August 1996

Nagtoralik Paamiut	1–5	Nagdlunguaq-48

Nuuk Stadium, Nuuk

=== Fifth-place match ===
31 August 1996

A.T.A.-60	4–6	Kissaviarsuk-33

Nuuk Stadium, Nuuk

=== Third-place match ===
1 September 1996

Nuuk IL	0–2	Disko-76

Nuuk Stadium, Nuuk

=== Final ===
1 September 1996

B-67 Nuuk	6–3	Kugsak-45

Nuuk Stadium, Nuuk
Attendance: 1000

== See also ==
- Football in Greenland
- Football Association of Greenland
- Greenland national football team
- Greenlandic Men's Football Championship
