= Ari Hermann =

Greenlandic footballer (born 1997)

Personal information
- Full name: Ari Claus Jean Lehnfelt Hermann
- Date of birth: 6 September 1997 (age 29)
- Place of birth: Nanortalik, Greenland
- Position: Midfielder

Team information
- Current team: B-67 Nuuk
- Number: 11

Youth career
- –2003: Siuteroq-43
- 2003–2005: South Burnaby Metro Club
- 2005–2010: GSS
- 2011–2013: B-67 Nuuk
- 2014: Silkeborg
- 2014–2016: Viborg

Senior career*
Years	Team	Apps	(Gls)
2016–	B-67 Nuuk		

International career^{‡}
2017–	Greenland	5	(0)
- * Club domestic league appearances and goals as of 19:36, 1 February 2023 (UTC) ‡ National team caps and goals as of 19:36, 1 February 2023 (UTC)

Ari Hermann (born 6 September 1997) is a Greenlandic footballer who currently plays for Greenlandic Football Championship club B-67 Nuuk and the Greenland national team. Former national team head coach Jens Tang Olesen has described Hermann as one of the most talented players in the country.

== Club career ==
Hermann began playing football as a youth with Siuteroq Nanortalik-43 in his hometown of Nanortalik. When he was six or seven years old he moved to Canada with his family as his father had a work assignment there. There he played football on a grass pitch for the first time and joined South Burnaby Metro Club, a club from outside of Vancouver.

He returned to Greenland at almost age nine and moved to Nuuk. He began playing for local club Grønlands Seminariums Sportklub before switching to B-67 Nuuk at age thirteen. He went on to lead the club to four Greenlandic U18 championships and was named the league's Player of the Season and a member of the Team of the Season in 2012. He competed in the senior Greenlandic Football Championship for the first time in 2011 at age fourteen.

During the summer of 2014 he moved to Denmark to attend a boarding school in Silkeborg. For one season he played in the academy of Silkeborg IF before switching to a school in Viborg and joining the academy of Viborg FF and FK Viborg. Hermann scored nine goals in twelve games during his first season, making him the club's top scorer and second-top scorer in the under-19 division. He made further appearances for the club in the reserve league. In the final match of the 2015 under-19 division season, Hermann played a vital role in the offense as the team secured a 2–1 victory over FC Vestsjælland and a third-place finish in the table.

By 2016 Hermann had returned to Greenland and rejoined B-67 Nuuk. The club advanced to the league final that season, defeating Nagdlunguaq-48 to win the title. He was named to the team of the season for his performances. He helped the club reach the league final again for the 2017 season before ultimately falling to IT-79. Hermann was again named one of the top two forwards in the league at the end-of-season awards. He was one of the squad's key members as the club won the league championship in again in 2018.

== International career ==
Hermann was selected for the national futsal team for the 2012 Arctic Winter Games in Whitehorse, Yukon. Greenland advanced to the final before being defeated by Russia's Yamalo-Nenets Autonomous Okrug. He was the tournament's top scorer that year. He competed again in the 2014 edition of the tournament. This time Greenland won the championship with Hermann being the top scorer again.

Hermann was called up to the senior national team for the first time in 2014 but did not see much playing time because of injury. He was later called up to the Greenland squad for the 2017 Island Games. He went on to make three appearances in the competition.

In August 2021, Greenland head coach Morten Rutkjær named Hermann to the 24-man squad that would train and compete against several Danish clubs in Denmark the following month. The camp was the first of its kind after the Greenland Football Association began the process of joining CONCACAF.

He was then part of the roster for Greenland's first match against an official national team after beginning the process of joining CONCACAF, a friendly match against Kosovo under-21 to be played in Turkey in September 2022. He was also in the starting line-up in a 6–1 defeat to Al-Kahrabaa SC of the Iraqi Premier League during the camp.
