= 1966–67 Greenlandic Football Championship =

5th edition of the Greenlandic Men's Football Championship

Greenlandic Football Championship
- Season: 1966–67
- Champions: Kissaviarsuk-33 (2nd title)

The 1966–67 Greenlandic Football Championship was the fifth edition of the Greenlandic Men's Football Championship. The final round was held in Nuuk. It was the second football championship won by Kissaviarsuk-33.

== Qualifying stage ==
=== Disko Bay ===
Pos	Team	Pld	W	D	L	GF	GA	GD	Pts	Qualification or relegation
1	Tupilak-41	2	2	0	0	6	3	+3	4	1967 Greenlandic Men's Football Championship Final Round
2	Nanok-50	2	0	0	2	3	6	−3	0	

=== Central Greenland ===
Central Greenland quarter-finals
Grønlands Seminarius Sportklub	W
Tusilartoq	L
Nuuk IL	W
Iliarssuq	L

Central Greenland semi-finals
Siumut Amerdlok Kunuk	3
Kagssagssuk Maniitsoq	2
Grønlands Seminarius Sportklub	6
Nuuk IL	1

Central Greenland final
Siumut Amerdlok Kunuk	3
Grønlands Seminarius Sportklub	2

Siumut Amerdlok Kunuk qualified for the final Round.

=== South Greenland ===
Pos	Team	Pld	W	D	L	GF	GA	GD	Pts	Qualification or relegation
1	Kissaviarsuk-33	2	2	0	0	10	3	+7	4	1967 Greenlandic Men's Football Championship Final Round
2	Nagtoralik Paamiut	1	0	0	1	-	-	—	0	
3	Aassik-43	1	0	0	1	-	-	—	0	

^{NB} Some match results are unavailable.

== Final round ==
Pos	Team	Pld	W	D	L	GF	GA	GD	Pts
1	Kissaviarsuk-33 (C)	2	2	0	0	4	2	+2	4
2	Tupilak-41	2	1	0	1	8	5	+3	2
3	Siumut Amerdlok Kunuk	2	0	0	2	2	7	−5	0

(C) Champions
17 September 1967

Tupilak-41	6–2	Siumut Amerdlok Kunuk

Nuuk Stadium, Nuuk

18 September 1967

Kissaviarsuk-33	1–0	Siumut Amerdlok Kunuk

Nuuk Stadium, Nuuk

19 September 1967

Kissaviarsuk-33	3–2	Tupilak-41

Nuuk Stadium, Nuuk

== See also ==
- Football in Greenland
- Football Association of Greenland
- Greenland national football team
- Greenlandic Football Championship
