= 2019 Greenlandic Football Championship =

2019 GrønlandsBANKEN GM
- Season: 2019
- Champions: Nagdlunguaq-48 (11th title)

The 2019 GrønlandsBANKEN GM was the 49th edition of the Greenlandic Football Championship. The final round was held in Sisimiut from 5 to 11 August. It was won by Nagdlunguaq-48 for the eleventh time in its history.

== Qualifying stage ==
=== North Greenland ===
G-44 Qeqertarsuaq qualified for the Final Round.

=== Disko Bay ===
Pos	Team	Pld	W	D	L	GF	GA	GD	Pts	Qualification or relegation
1	Nagdlunguaq-48	2	2	0	0	23	1	+22	6	2019 GrønlandsBANKEN GM Final Round
2	Kugsak-45	2	1	0	1	9	4	+5	3	
3	Tupilak-41	2	0	0	2	0	27	−27	0	

=== Central Greenland ===
Pos	Team	Pld	W	D	L	GF	GA	GD	Pts	Qualification or relegation
1	Inuit Timersoqatigiiffiat-79	4	3	0	1	18	3	+15	9	2019 GrønlandsBANKEN GM Final Round
2	B-67 Nuuk	4	2	0	2	16	8	+8	6 (Note: B-67 Nuuk finished ahead of GSS and Nuuk IL on head-to-head goal difference: B-67 Nuuk +2, GSS =0, Nuuk IL –2.)	2019 GrønlandsBANKEN GM Final Round
3	Grønlands Seminarius Sportklub	4	2	0	2	9	12	−3	6	2019 GrønlandsBANKEN GM Final Round
4	Nuuk IL	4	2	0	2	10	12	−2	6	
5	FC Asummiut	4	1	0	3	6	23	−17	3	

=== South Greenland ===
Eqaluk-54 qualified for the Final Round. Kissaviarsuk-33, Nagtoralik Paamiut and Narsaq-85 failed to qualify.

== Final Round ==
Pos	Team	Pld	W	D	L	GF	GA	GD	Pts	Qualification or relegation
1	G-44 Qeqertarsuaq	5	4	1	0	14	5	+9	13	2019 GrønlandsBANKEN GM Final
2	Nagdlunguaq-48	5	4	0	1	27	4	+23	12	2019 GrønlandsBANKEN GM Final
3	B-67 Nuuk	5	3	1	1	16	6	+10	10	2019 GrønlandsBANKEN GM Third Place Match
4	Inuit Timersoqatigiiffiat-79	5	2	0	3	7	15	−8	6	2019 GrønlandsBANKEN GM Third Place Match
5	Eqaluk-54	5	1	0	4	8	22	−14	3	2019 GrønlandsBANKEN GM Fifth Place Match
6	Grønlands Seminarius Sportklub	5	0	0	5	3	23	−20	0	2019 GrønlandsBANKEN GM Fifth Place Match

5 August 2019

Inuit Timersoqatigiiffiat-79	3–1	Eqaluk-54

Sisimiut Stadium, Sisimiut
5 August 2019

G-44 Qeqertarsuaq	6–2	Grønlands Seminarius Sportklub

Sisimiut Stadium, Sisimiut
10 August 2019

Nagdlunguaq-48	4–0	B-67 Nuuk

Sisimiut Stadium, Sisimiut

6 August 2019

Nagdlunguaq-48	3–1	Inuit Timersoqatigiiffiat-79

Sisimiut Stadium, Sisimiut
6 August 2019

B-67 Nuuk	1–1	G-44 Qeqertarsuaq

Sisimiut Stadium, Sisimiut
6 August 2019

Eqaluk-54	5–1	Grønlands Seminarius Sportklub

Sisimiut Stadium, Sisimiut

7 August 2019

Nagdlunguaq-48	1–2	G-44 Qeqertarsuaq

Sisimiut Stadium, Sisimiut
7 August 2019

B-67 Nuuk	3–1	Eqaluk-54

Sisimiut Stadium, Sisimiut
7 August 2019

Inuit Timersoqatigiiffiat-79	2–0	Grønlands Seminarius Sportklub

Sisimiut Stadium, Sisimiut

8 August 2019

Nagdlunguaq-48	14–1	Eqaluk-54

Sisimiut Stadium, Sisimiut
8 August 2019

B-67 Nuuk	5–0	Grønlands Seminarius Sportklub

Sisimiut Stadium, Sisimiut
8 August 2019

Inuit Timersoqatigiiffiat-79	1–4	G-44 Qeqertarsuaq

Sisimiut Stadium, Sisimiut

9 August 2019

Nagdlunguaq-48	5–0	Grønlands Seminarius Sportklub

Sisimiut Stadium, Sisimiut
9 August 2019

B-67 Nuuk	7–0	Inuit Timersoqatigiiffiat-79

Sisimiut Stadium, Sisimiut
9 August 2019

Eqaluk-54	0–1	G-44 Qeqertarsuaq

Sisimiut Stadium, Sisimiut

== Playoffs ==
=== Fifth-place match ===
11 August 2019

Eqaluk-54	6–0	Grønlands Seminarius Sportklub

Sisimiut Stadium, Sisimiut

=== Third-place match ===
11 August 2019

B-67 Nuuk	0–2	Inuit Timersoqatigiiffiat-79

Sisimiut Stadium, Sisimiut

=== Final ===
11 August 2019

G-44 Qeqertarsuaq	0–1	Nagdlunguaq-48

Sisimiut Stadium, Sisimiut

== See also ==
- Football in Greenland
- Football Association of Greenland
- Greenland national football team
- Greenlandic Men's Football Championship
