= 2013 Greenlandic Men's Football Championship =

2013 Coca Cola GM
- Season: 2013
- Champions: B-67 Nuuk (9th title)

The 2013 Coca-Cola GM was the 43rd edition of the Greenlandic Men's Football Championship. The final round was held in Qaqortoq from 15 to 21 August. It was won by B-67 Nuuk for the second consecutive time and for the ninth time in its history.

== Qualifying stage ==
=== North Greenland ===
Pos	Team	Pld	W	D	L	GF	GA	GD	Pts	Qualification or relegation
1	FC Malamuk	3	2	0	1	23	3	+20	6	2013 Coca Cola GM Final Round
2	Kingmeq-45	3	2	0	1	5	9	−4	6	
3	Eqaluk-56	3	1	1	1	3	4	−1	4	
4	Amaroq Saattut	3	0	1	2	6	21	−15	1	

=== Disko Bay ===
G-44 Qeqertarsuaq and Ilulissat-69 qualified for the Final Round.

=== Central Greenland ===
B-67 Nuuk and Nuuk IL qualified for the Final Round.

=== East Greenland ===
Kuummiut-64 qualified for the Final Round.

=== South Greenland ===
Eqaluk-54 qualified for the Final Round.

^{NB} Kissaviarsuk-33 qualified for the final Round as hosts.

== Final round ==
=== Pool 1 ===
Pos	Team	Pld	W	D	L	GF	GA	GD	Pts	Qualification or relegation
1	G-44 Qeqertarsuaq	3	2	1	0	13	2	+11	7	2013 Coca Cola GM Semi-finals
2	Nuuk IL	3	2	1	0	5	1	+4	7	2013 Coca Cola GM Semi-finals
3	Eqaluk-54	3	1	0	2	6	7	−1	3	
4	Kuummiut-64	3	0	0	3	2	16	−14	0	

15 August 2013

G-44 Qeqertarsuaq	1–1	Nuuk IL

Qaqortoq Stadium, Qaqortoq
15 August 2013

Kuummiut-64	2–5	Eqaluk-54

Qaqortoq Stadium, Qaqortoq

16 August 2013

G-44 Qeqertarsuaq	8–0	Kuummiut-64

Qaqortoq Stadium, Qaqortoq
16 August 2013

Nuuk IL	1–0	Eqaluk-54

Qaqortoq Stadium, Qaqortoq

17 August 2013

G-44 Qeqertarsuaq	4–1	Eqaluk-54

Qaqortoq Stadium, Qaqortoq
17 August 2013

Nuuk IL	3–0	Kuummiut-64

Qaqortoq Stadium, Qaqortoq

=== Pool 2 ===
Pos	Team	Pld	W	D	L	GF	GA	GD	Pts	Qualification or relegation
1	B-67 Nuuk	3	3	0	0	10	1	+9	9	2013 Coca Cola GM Semi-finals
2	FC Malamuk	3	1	1	1	3	3	0	4	2013 Coca Cola GM Semi-finals
3	Kissaviarsuk-33	3	1	1	1	2	4	−2	4	
4	Ilulissat-69	3	0	0	3	2	9	−7	0	

15 August 2013

Kissaviarsuk-33	1–0	Ilulissat-69

Qaqortoq Stadium, Qaqortoq
15 August 2013

B-67 Nuuk	1–0	FC Malamuk

Qaqortoq Stadium, Qaqortoq

16 August 2013

Ilulissat-69	1–6	B-67 Nuuk

Qaqortoq Stadium, Qaqortoq
16 August 2013

Kissaviarsuk-33	1–1	FC Malamuk

Qaqortoq Stadium, Qaqortoq

17 August 2013

Ilulissat-69	1–2	FC Malamuk

Qaqortoq Stadium, Qaqortoq
17 August 2013

Kissaviarsuk-33	0–3	B-67 Nuuk

Qaqortoq Stadium, Qaqortoq

== Playoffs ==
=== Semi-finals ===
19 August 2013

Eqaluk-54	1–2	Ilulissat-69

Qaqortoq Stadium, Qaqortoq
19 August 2013

Kissaviarsuk-33	4–0	Kuummiut-64

Qaqortoq Stadium, Qaqortoq

19 August 2013

G-44 Qeqertarsuaq	3–1	FC Malamuk

Qaqortoq Stadium, Qaqortoq
19 August 2013

B-67 Nuuk	4–0	Nuuk IL

Qaqortoq Stadium, Qaqortoq

=== Seventh-place match ===
20 August 2013

Eqaluk-54	6–1	Kuummiut-64

Qaqortoq Stadium, Qaqortoq

=== Fifth-place match ===
20 August 2013

Kissaviarsuk-33	3–0	Ilulissat-69

Qaqortoq Stadium, Qaqortoq

=== Third-place match ===
21 August 2013

FC Malamuk	1–2	Nuuk IL

Qaqortoq Stadium, Qaqortoq

=== Final ===
21 August 2013

B-67 Nuuk	3–2	G-44 Qeqertarsuaq

Qaqortoq Stadium, Qaqortoq

== See also ==
- Football in Greenland
- Football Association of Greenland
- Greenland national football team
- Greenlandic Men's Football Championship
