= Milo Biilmann =

Greenlandic footballer (born 2001)

Personal information
- Full name: Milo Lynge Biilmann
- Date of birth: 29 July 2007 (age 19)
- Place of birth: Greenland
- Position: Midfielder

Team information
- Current team: KÍ

Youth career
- –2022: Holbæk B&I
- 2022–2023: B67 Nuuk
- 2023–2024: KÍ

Senior career*
Years	Team	Apps	(Gls)
2023–	KÍ II	9	(1)
2024–	KÍ	0	(0)

International career^{‡}
2024–	Greenland	1	(0)
- * Club domestic league appearances and goals as of 18:00, 8 June 2023 (UTC) ‡ National team caps and goals as of 18:00, 8 June 2023 (UTC)

Milo Biilmann (born 29 July 2007) is a Greenlandic footballer who plays as a midfielder for Faroe Islands Premier League club Klaksvíkar Ítróttarfelag, and the Greenland national team. By joining KÍ, Biilmann became the first Greenlandic player of Inuk heritage to sign for a professional club.

== Club career ==
In 2021, Biilmann played for the under-15 team of Holbæk B&I in Denmark. In summer 2023, his parent club B67 Nuuk secured funding for him to attend school in the Faroe Islands and enter the academy of Klaksvíkar Ítróttarfelag. He arrived in the Faroe Islands in summer 2023 and began playing with the KÍ's under-17 side. Shortley thereafter, he began appearing for the club's reserve side in the 1. deild. On 8 July 2024, the club announced that it had signed Biilmann to a senior first-team contract.

== International career ==
Biilmann made his senior debut with the Greenland national team on 1 June 2024 in a friendly against Turkmenistan.
