= 1967–68 Greenlandic Football Championship =

Greenlandic Football Championship
- Season: 1967–68
- Champions: Tupilak-41 (1st title)

The 1967–68 Greenlandic Football Championship was the sixth edition of the Greenlandic Men's Football Championship. The final round was held in Nuuk. It was the first football championship won by Tupilak-41.

== Qualifying stage ==
=== North Greenland ===
Tupilak-41 qualified for the final Round.

=== Central Greenland ===
Central Greenland semi-finals
Sisimiut/Maniitsoq Final
Siumut Amerdlok Kunuk	W
Narssarmiutaq	L

Central Greenland final
Nuuk IL	L
Siumut Amerdlok Kunuk	W

Siumut Amerdlok Kunuk qualified for the final Round.

=== South Greenland ===
South Greenland quarter-finals
Aassik-43	7
Narssarmiutaq	1

South Greenland semi-finals
Kissaviarsuk-33	11
Aassik-43	1
Siuteroq	3
Nagtoralik Paamiut	9

South Greenland final
Kissaviarsuk-33	W
Nagtoralik Paamiut	L

Kissaviarsuk-33 qualified for the final Round.

== Final round ==
Pos	Team	Pld	W	D	L	GF	GA	GD	Pts
1	Tupilak-41 (C)	2	2	0	0	12	3	+9	4
2	Siumut Amerdlok Kunuk	2	1	0	1	5	7	−2	2
3	Kissaviarsuk-33	2	0	0	2	2	9	−7	0

(C) Champions
8 September 1968

Tupilak-41	6–1	Kissaviarsuk-33

Nuuk Stadium, Nuuk

10 September 1968

Siumut Amerdlok Kunuk	3–1	Kissaviarsuk-33

Nuuk Stadium, Nuuk

12 September 1968

Tupilak-41	6–2	Siumut Amerdlok Kunuk

Nuuk Stadium, Nuuk

== See also ==
- Football in Greenland
- Football Association of Greenland
- Greenland national football team
- Greenlandic Football Championship
