= Tekle Ghebrelul =

Eritrean football manager

Tekle Ghebrelul (born 2 January 1969) is an Eritrean football manager.

== Early life ==
Ghebrelul was born in 1969 in Asmara, Eritrea. He started playing football in his bare feet at a young age. He was a child soldier and immigrated to Denmark before immigrating to Greenland after seeing a newspaper article about the country.

== Managerial career ==
In 2009, Ghebrelul was appointed manager of Greenlandic side B-67, helping the club win eight league titles. He has been described as a Greenlandic football "legend" and is regarded to have helped create the foundations for football in the country and to have been the national football and futsal team's most successful football manager. After that, he worked as a football manager, teacher, and cleaner in Sweden.

== Political career ==
Ghebrelul ran for Greenlandic municipal elections for the Inuit Ataqatigiit party.

== Personal life ==
Ghebrelul has nine older siblings.
