= Inuit Timersoqatigiiffiat-79 =

Greenlandic football club

- Full name: Inuit Timersoqatigiiffiat-79
- Nickname: IT79
- Founded: 1979
- Ground: Nuuk Stadium; Nuuk, Greenland
- Capacity: 2,000
- Manager: Allan Geisler / Kaassannguaq Zeeb
- League: Greenlandic Football Championship
Home colours	Away colours

Inuit Timersoqatigiiffiat-79 is a football club based in Nuuk, Greenland. They play in the Greenlandic Football Championship. They won the 2016 Coca-Cola GM league and made history in hometown Nuuk in a controversial final on 8 May, beating Nagdlunguak-48 5–1

== Achievements ==
- Greenlandic Football Championship Outdoor
  - First place: 2017
  - Second place: 2015
  - Third place: 2014, 2016, 2018, 2019, 2022, 2024
- Greenlandic Football Championship Futsal
  - First place: 2016
  - Second place: 2015
  - Third place: 2014
