= Ammassalimmi Timersoqatigiiffik Ammassak =

Greenlandic football club

A.T.A.
- Full name: Ammassalimmi Timersoqatigiiffik Ammassak
- Founded: 1960
- Ground: Tasiilaq Stadium; Tasiilaq, Greenland
- Capacity: 2,000
- Chairman: Poul Sørensen
- League: Greenlandic Football Championship
Home colours	Away colours

Ammassalimmi Timersoqatigiiffik Ammassak (also known as A.T.A.) is a sports and football club from Greenland, based in Tasiilaq. Their association football team did not appear in the 2007 edition of the island's top league, the Greenlandic Men's Football Championship, despite finishing in 4th place in 2006. The club has not played any season since then.
