= Boldklubben af 1967 =

Association sport club in Nuuk, Greenland

B-67 Nuuk
- Full name: Boldklubben af 1967
- Nickname: B67
- Founded: 1967; 59 years ago
- Ground: Nuuk Stadium; Nuuk, Greenland
- Capacity: 2,000
- President: Christian Laursen
- Manager: Tekle Ghebrelul
- League: Greenlandic Football Championship
- 2025: Greenlandic Football Championship, 1st
- Website: https://b67.klub-modul.dk
Home colours	Away colours

Boldklubben af 1967 (also known as B-67 or B-67 Nuuk) is a sports club from Greenland based in Nuuk. They compete in football, badminton and handball. In 2016 they won the Coca Cola GM by defeating Nagdlunguaq-48 3–1. In the 1980s they were a small club in the heart of Nuuk. They mainly focused on youth development during the mid-1980s, significantly helping this side's rise to fame.

B-67 took part in many competitions but went without a trophy for 25 years. In 1993, the club began to grow with the signings of elite Nordic players and training facilities grew, massively impacting the squad. With better coaching, this B-67 side won 85% of their senior matches and played in 8 finals after 1988, yet winning none.

Many players from B-67 Nuuk have played for the Greenland national football team, with 8 in the 19 man squad that got seventh in the 2023 Island Games. B-67 played several matches against teams in Iceland and the Faroe Islands with an average win rate of 74%. They had success in Copenhagen, Reykjavík, and Tórshavn. The U-19 team had many successes in Malmö particularly, with a win rate of 84%.

Since then, B-67 have gone on to win many championships, a record 13 times, making history in the country's capital. They have proven successful against local rivals, with a current win rate of 82%, the highest being at 91% in 2008 and lowest in 2020, 78%. B-67 often play home games at the Nuuk Stadium in front of dozens of spectators. In other sports, they also play badminton and handball.

== Domestic history ==
Key

Champion Runners-up 3rd Place

Season	Qualifying									Finals								Overall
Season	Div.	Pos.	Pl.	W	D	L	GF	GA	Pts.	Pos.	Pl.	W	D	L	GF	GA	Pts.	Overall
1967–68	1st	—N/a	1	0	0	1	1	6	—N/a	Did not qualify								
1969	1st	—N/a	3	3	0	0	—N/a		—N/a	—N/a	1	0	0	1	1	2	—N/a	SF
1970	1st	Did not enter								—N/a								
2019	1st	2nd	4	2	0	2	16	8	6	3rd	6	3	1	2	16	8	10	4th
2020	1st	Qualified automatically								Abandoned because of COVID-19 pandemic								
2021	1st	1st	1	1	0	0	8	0	3	Abandoned because of COVID-19 pandemic								
2022	1st	1st	4	4	0	0	17	2	12	2nd	3	2	0	1	12	1	6	2nd

== Honours and achievements ==
- Greenlandic Football Championship:
  - Winners (17) 1993, 1994, 1996, 1999, 2005, 2008, 2010, 2012, 2013, 2014, 2015, 2016, 2018, 2023, 2024, 2025 , 2026
  - Runners-up (5): 2002, 2004, 2011, 2017, 2022

== Current squad ==
As of 9 April 2017

Note: Flags indicate national team as defined under FIFA eligibility rules; some limited exceptions apply. Players may hold more than one non-FIFA nationality.

No.	Pos.	Nation	Player
—	GK	GRL	Loke Svane
—		GRL	Ari Hermann
—		GRL	Poul Thomas Kuko
—		GRL	John Broberg
—		GRL	Niklas Thorleifsen
—		GRL	Johan Bidstrup
—		GRL	Malik Juhl
—		GRL	Frederik Seals
—		GRL	Anders Petersen

No.	Pos.	Nation	Player
—		GRL	Mika Davidsen
—		GRL	Adam Ghebrelul
—		GRL	Mikkel Hansen
—		GRL	Milo Petersen
—		GRL	Inuk Mathiassen
—		GRL	Maaseeraq Pedersen
—		GRL	Mads Christensen
—		GRL	Mikkel Lynge
—		GRL	Niklas Kleist

== Affiliated Clubs ==
- (Denmark) F.C. Copenhagen
