= Nuuk Stadium =

Sports venue in Nuuk, Greenland

Coordinates: 64°10′51″N 51°43′57″W

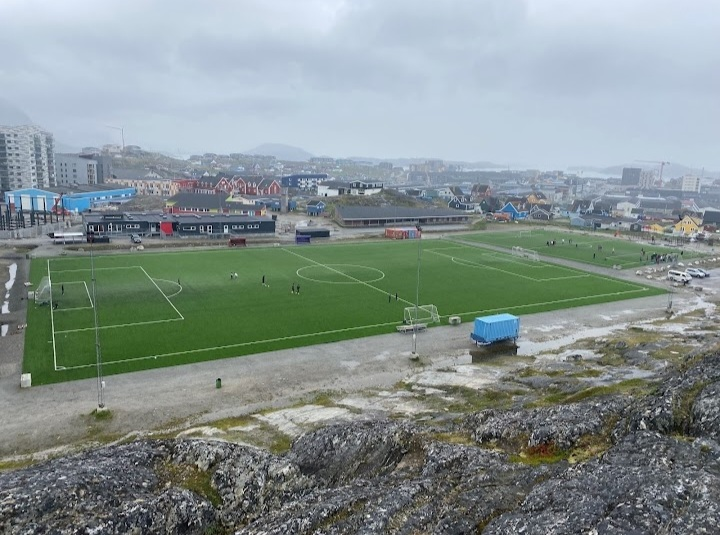
- Interactive map of Nuuk Stadium
- Location: Nuuk, Sermersooq, Greenland
- Owner: Government of Nuuk
- Operator: Football Association of Greenland
- Capacity: 2,000
- Surface: Artificial turf
- Field size: 101 x 70 meters

Tenants
- Greenland national football team Nuuk IL; B-67 Nuuk

Nuuk Stadium is a multi-purpose venue in Nuuk, Greenland. It is currently used mostly for football matches. It has a capacity for 2,000.

FIFA 2-star artificial turf was installed on the pitch in July 2016. The 2-star rating is the highest achievable rating for an artificial surface and is suitable for all UEFA competitions.

== Venue ==
It can also be used as an entertainment venue. On November 2, 2007, Scottish rock band Nazareth, of "Love Hurts" fame, performed at the venue, and on April 1, 2011, the venue was visited by Suzi Quatro.

== See also ==
- Arktisk Stadion
