= G-44 Qeqertarsuaq =

Greenlandic football club

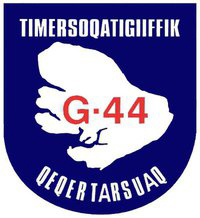
- Full name: Godhavn-44 Qeqertarsuarmi timersoqatigiiffik
- Founded: 17 September 1944; 82 years ago
- Ground: Qeqertarsuaq Stadium; Qeqertarsuaq, Greenland
- Capacity: 1,000
- League: Coca Cola GM
Home colours	Away colours

G-44 Qeqertarsuarmi timersoqatigiiffik is a football club based in Qeqertarsuaq, Greenland. They play in the Coca Cola GM.

== Achievements ==
- Coca Cola GM: 2
  - Champions : 2009, 2011
