= Kagssagssuk Maniitsoq =

Greenland football club

- Full name: Timersoqatigiiffik Kagssagssuk
- Founded: 1937
- Ground: Maniitsoq Stadium; Maniitsoq, Greenland
- League: Coca Cola GM
Home colours	Away colours

Kagssagssuk Maniitsoq is a sports club from Greenland based in Maniitsoq. They compete in the Coca Cola GM.

== Achievements ==
- Coca Cola GM: 1
  - Champion : 1989
