= Kugsak-45 =

Greenlandic sports club

- Full name: Timersoqatigiiffik Kugsak-45 Qasigiannguit
- Founded: 1945
- Ground: Qasigiannguit Stadium; Qasigiannguit, Greenland
- Capacity: Unknown
- Chairman: Kristian Rosing
- Manager: Unknown
- League: Coca Cola GM
- 2008: 7th
Home colours	Away colours

Kugsak-45 is a sports club from Greenland based in Qasigiannguit. They compete in the Coca Cola GM.

== Achievements ==
- Coca Cola GM: 2
  - Champion : 1995, 2002
