= FC Malamuk =

Greenlandic football club

- Full name: FC Malamuk
- Founded: 1979
- Ground: Uummannaq Stadium; Uummannaq, Greenland
- Capacity: 2,000
- Chairman: Sakio Fleischer
- Manager: Gert Fleischer
- League: Coca Cola GM
Home colours	Away colours

FC Malamuk is a football club from Greenland based in Uummannaq. All league games, however, are played in the national stadium in Nuuk.

Malamuk midfielder Kaassa Zeeb featured in the Greenland national football team at the 2006 ELF Cup.

== Achievements ==
- Coca Cola GM: 1
  - Champion : 2004
