= Football in Greenland =

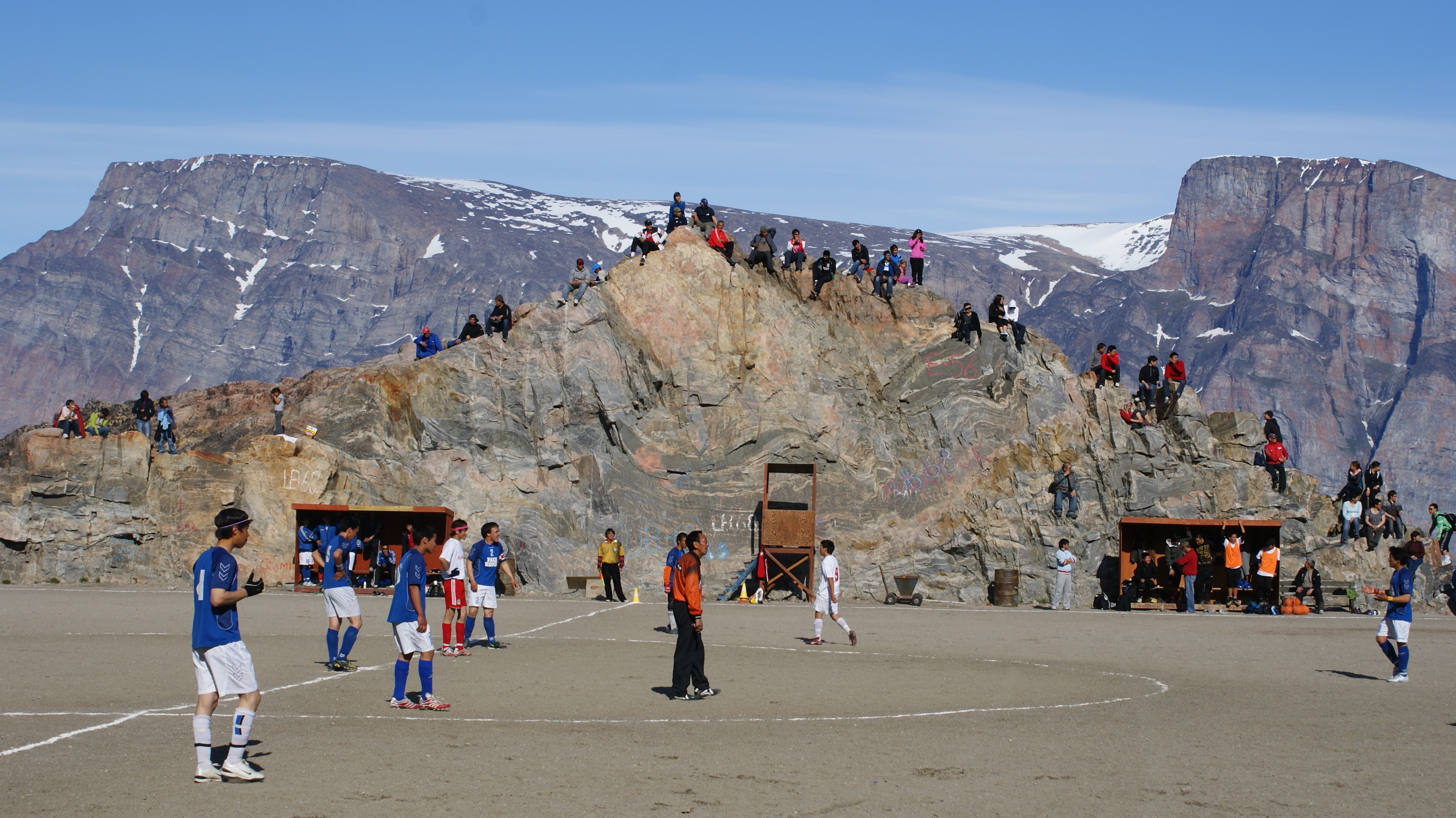
Football match in Uummannaq

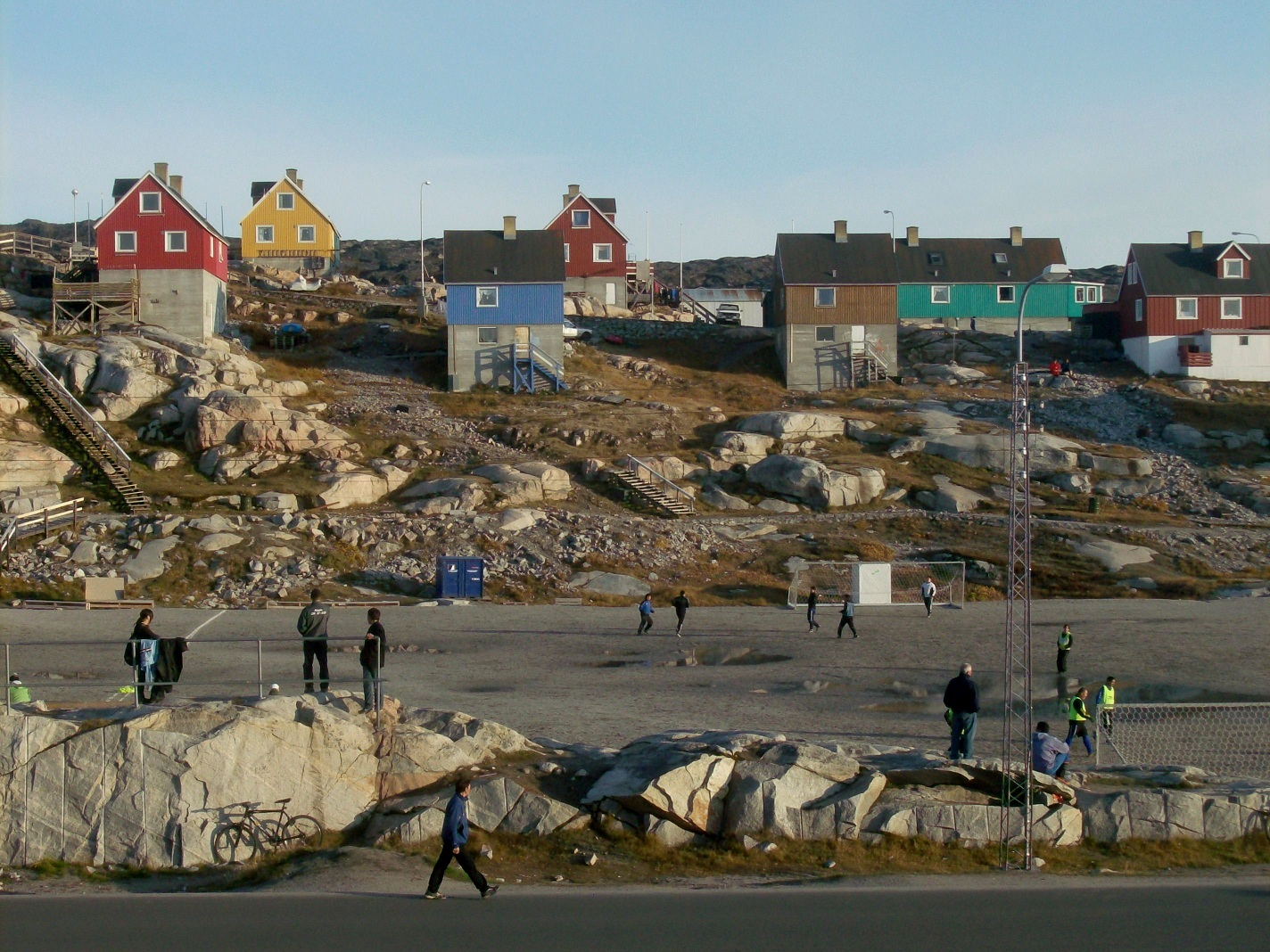
Football field in Ilulissat

Association football (Greenlandic: isikkamik-asarneq) is the most popular and the national sport of Greenland. It was brought to Greenland by Danish settlers. Because of the climatic conditions, Greenland is unable to support any grass pitches, so games are played on artificial turf. The national stadium is the Nuuk Stadium in the capital of Greenland, Nuuk. There is a proposal to replace Nuuk Stadium with a new stadium, named Arktisk Stadion.

The Football Association of Greenland, founded in 1971, is not a member of FIFA or any of its confederations, but was a member of the International Football Union and ConIFA, secondary governing bodies of association football for nations and sub-national countries that are not FIFA members. Although the Faroe Islands, another dependency of Denmark, is a member of FIFA and UEFA, Greenland is considered part of Denmark for the purposes of international football. However, Greenland have still been fighting to join UEFA and FIFA. The Greenland football association and the Danish DBU entered into an agreement in 2015 to grow the sport of football in Greenland and work towards FIFA and UEFA membership by 2022. With the update of UEFA's statutes to forbid the admission of football associations from non-independent regions, Greenland found their path to UEFA membership closed. They later applied to CONCACAF, but that application was unsuccessful.

== League history ==
While evidence of league football can be found as early as 1954, the men's league became a consistent presence from the mid to late 1960s, with an edition of the Greenlandic Football Championship annually since 1969. The difficulty and expense of travel on the island means that to this day it is formatted with local qualifying rounds, leading to a final tournament in a single host location. This has given risen to the popular statement that the season lasts only a week, something true only for that final round. While teams from the capital, Nuuk, have mainly been successful, winners have come from across the island. However, 9 of B-67 Nuuk's record 13 titles have come since 2005.

The women's league system follows the same pattern, though it took a lot longer to form, with a league being trialled by the association in 1986. Since then it has also run annually, with many familiar teams from the men's league also competing. Here the capital teams have not been as successful, with the record title holders being Ilulissat-69, 3 titles ahead of Nuuk Idraetslag and the two teams taking home over two thirds of the competitions to date.

Data on the futsal, youth and veterans leagues is much more sporadic but have been similar in years past. They are typically played earlier in the season than the main leagues to prevent overlap.

There has also been a campaign in recent years to enter a Greenland team into the Danish Superliga.

== The national football teams ==
Without CONCACAF or UEFA membership, opportunities are limited for any Greenlandic national sides. In the 1980s they organised 3 editions of the Greenland Cup with the tournaments being hosted by Iceland, Greenland and the Faroe Islands. Iceland missed the 1983 edition, but otherwise the three sides all competed. Further opportunity came with the introduction of football to the Island Games in 1989. Greenland would enter the inaugural tournament and finish 4th from 5 teams, with them appearing at every edition since, except for the 2007 Games. The men have twice come 2nd at the games, last in 2017, though once was in the small 4-team edition in Bermuda at the Football at the 2013 Island Games – Men's tournament. The team also occasionally travel to compete against more varied sides, with matches against Icelandic club and youth national sides having come in the past and Danish club sides more recently. One of the biggest moments in the island's footballing history came in 2001 when the national team played a landmark fixture against Tibet in Denmark, the game went ahead despite great pressure by the Chinese Government and FIFA to have it called off.

The Island Games would also eventually provide opportunities for the women's national team, with the inaugural tournament coming in 2001. However, Greenland would not compete until 2007, sending the women's team instead of the men to the tournament. While 2013 would prove similar to the men's tournament, with the team finishing 2nd in part due to the small scale of the edition, they have also managed a 3rd place finish at the 2011 Games. They are also regulars at the Island Games since their debut.

Youth international teams have also been set up, with men's U21 and U19 sides having trained previously, though there is not significant evidence beyond that.

Futsal, considering the usual weather, is a prominent sport, with the Greenland national futsal team competing where possible in Futsal Week tournaments and the Nordic Futsal Cup, though similarly to the football sides, their participation is limited by their lack of FIFA membership. They have even expanded into youth futsal, with the U19s taking part in the 2022 Futsal Week competition.

== Football stadiums in Greenland ==
Stadium	Capacity	City
Nuuk Stadium	2,000	Nuuk
