= List of football clubs in Greenland =

This is a list of football clubs located in Greenland, sorted alphabetically, and including geographical provenience, home stadium information and number of Greenlandic Men's Football Championship won.

Club	City	Stadium (capacity)	Greenlandic Men's Football Championships won
Aqigssiaq	Maniitsoq	Manittsoq Stadium (unknown)	1
A.T.A.	Tasiilaq	Nuuk Stadium (2,000)	0
B-67	Nuuk	Nuuk Stadium (2,000)	13
CIF-70 Qasigiannguit	Qasigiannguit	Qasigiannguit Stadium (unknown)	1
Eqaluk-54	Tasiusaq		0
Eqaluk-56	Ikerasak		0
Grønlands Seminarius Sportklub	Nuuk	Nuuk Stadium (2,000)	5
G-44 Qeqertarsuaq	Qeqertarsuaq	Qeqertarsuaq Stadium (unknown)	1
Inuit Timersoqatigiiffiat-79	Nuuk	Nuuk Stadium (2,000)	1
Kissaviarsuk-33	Qaqortoq	Qaqortoq Football Stadium (unknown)	8
Kugsak-45	Qasigiannguit	Qasigiannguit Stadium (unknown)	2
FC Malamuk	Uummannaq	Uummannaq Stadium (2,000)	1
Nagdlunguaq-48	Ilulissat	Nuuk Stadium (2,000)	12
Nuuk Idraetslag	Nuuk	Nuuk Stadium (2,000)	5
Siumut Amerdlok Kunuk	Sisimiut	Sisimiut Stadium (500)	1
Tupilak-41	Aasiaat	Aasiaat Stadium (unknown)	3

== See also ==
- Football in Greenland
- Football Association of Greenland
- Greenland national football team
- Greenlandic Men's Football Championship
