= 1993 Greenlandic Men's Football Championship =

- Season: 1993
- Champions: B-67 Nuuk (1st title)

The 1993 Greenlandic Men's Football Championship was the 23rd edition of the Greenlandic Men's Football Championship. The final round was held in Qaqortoq. It was won by B-67 Nuuk for the first time in its history.

== First round ==
=== Capital Region ===
Pos	Team	Pld	W	D	L	GF	GA	GD	Pts	Qualification or relegation
1	B-67 Nuuk	4	3	0	1	12	1	+11	6	1993 Central Greenland Second round
2	Nuuk IL	4	3	0	1	6	6	0	6	1993 Central Greenland Second round
3	B-67 Nuuk B	4	0	0	4	2	13	−11	0	

== Second round ==
=== North Greenland ===
Pos	Team	Pld	W	D	L	GF	GA	GD	Pts	Qualification or relegation
1	FC Malamuk	4	4	0	0	19	7	+12	8	1993 Greenlandic Men's Football Championship Final Round
2	Kingmeq-45	4	2	0	2	10	13	−3	4	
3	Ukaleq-55	4	0	0	4	7	16	−9	0	

=== Disko Bay ===
Pos	Team	Pld	W	D	L	GF	GA	GD	Pts	Qualification or relegation
1	Tupilak-41	8	5	2	1	20	16	+4	12	1993 Greenlandic Men's Football Championship Final Round
2	Nagdlunguaq-48	8	3	3	2	23	17	+6	9	1993 Greenlandic Men's Football Championship Final Round
3	Kugsak-45	8	4	1	3	16	12	+4	9	
4	Ilulissat-69	8	2	3	3	18	18	0	7	
5	Disko-76	8	1	1	6	11	25	−14	3	

=== Central Greenland ===
Pos	Team	Pld	W	D	L	GF	GA	GD	Pts	Qualification or relegation
1	B-67 Nuuk	4	2	2	0	8	4	+4	6	1993 Greenlandic Men's Football Championship Final Round
2	Siumut Amerdlok Kunuk	4	2	2	0	5	3	+2	6	1993 Greenlandic Men's Football Championship Final Round
3	Kagssagssuk Maniitsoq	4	2	1	1	11	5	+6	5	
4	Nuuk IL	5	1	1	3	6	14	−8	3	
5	Aqigssiaq Maniitsoq	4	0	1	3	6	10	−4	1	

=== South Greenland ===
Nagtoralik Paamiut and Siuteroq Nanortalik-43 qualified for the final Round.

^{NB} Kissaviarsuk-33 qualified for the final Round as hosts.

== Final round ==
=== Pool 1 ===
Pos	Team	Pld	W	D	L	GF	GA	GD	Pts	Qualification or relegation
1	Kissaviarsuk-33	3	2	1	0	10	5	+5	5	1993 Greenlandic Men's Football Championship Semi-finals
2	Tupilak-41	3	1	2	0	7	6	+1	4	1993 Greenlandic Men's Football Championship Semi-finals
3	Siumut Amerdlok Kunuk	3	1	0	2	7	6	+1	2	1993 Greenlandic Men's Football Championship Fifth Place Match
4	FC Malamuk	3	0	1	2	6	13	−7	1	1993 Greenlandic Men's Football Championship Seventh Place Match

25 August 1993

FC Malamuk	3–3	Tupilak-41

Qaqortoq Stadium, Qaqortoq
25 August 1993

Kissaviarsuk-33	3–1	Siumut Amerdlok Kunuk

Qaqortoq Stadium, Qaqortoq

26 August 1993

FC Malamuk	1–5	Siumut Amerdlok Kunuk

Qaqortoq Stadium, Qaqortoq
26 August 1993

Tupilak-41	2–2	Kissaviarsuk-33

Qaqortoq Stadium, Qaqortoq

27 August 1993

Siumut Amerdlok Kunuk	1–2	Tupilak-41

Qaqortoq Stadium, Qaqortoq
27 August 1993

FC Malamuk	2–5	Kissaviarsuk-33

Qaqortoq Stadium, Qaqortoq

=== Pool 2 ===
Pos	Team	Pld	W	D	L	GF	GA	GD	Pts	Qualification or relegation
1	B-67 Nuuk	3	2	0	1	11	4	+7	4	1993 Greenlandic Men's Football Championship Semi-finals
2	Nagdlunguaq-48	3	2	0	1	13	8	+5	4	1993 Greenlandic Men's Football Championship Semi-finals
3	Siuteroq Nanortalik-43	3	1	0	2	6	10	−4	2	1993 Greenlandic Men's Football Championship Fifth Place Match
4	Nagtoralik Paamiut	3	1	0	2	8	16	−8	2	1993 Greenlandic Men's Football Championship Seventh Place Match

25 August 1993

Nagtoralik Paamiut	6–2	Siuteroq Nanortalik-43

Qaqortoq Stadium, Qaqortoq
25 August 1993

B-67 Nuuk	4–2	Nagdlunguaq-48

Qaqortoq Stadium, Qaqortoq

26 August 1993

Nagtoralik Paamiut	0–6	B-67 Nuuk

Qaqortoq Stadium, Qaqortoq
26 August 1993

Nagdlunguaq-48	3–2	Siuteroq Nanortalik-43

Qaqortoq Stadium, Qaqortoq

27 August 1993

Nagdlunguaq-48	8–2	Nagtoralik Paamiut

Qaqortoq Stadium, Qaqortoq
27 August 1993

Siuteroq Nanortalik-43	2–1	B-67 Nuuk

Qaqortoq Stadium, Qaqortoq

== Playoffs ==
=== Semi-finals ===
29 August 1993

Kissaviarsuk-33	1–0	Nagdlunguaq-48

Qaqortoq Stadium, Qaqortoq
29 August 1993

B-67 Nuuk	2–1	Tupilak-41

Qaqortoq Stadium, Qaqortoq

=== Seventh-place match ===
28 August 1993

FC Malamuk	6–2	Nagtoralik Paamiut

Qaqortoq Stadium, Qaqortoq

=== Fifth-place match ===
28 August 1993

Siumut Amerdlok Kunuk	2–1	Siuteroq Nanortalik-43

Qaqortoq Stadium, Qaqortoq

=== Third-place match ===
30 August 1993

Nagdlunguaq-48	5–4 (a.e.t.)	Tupilak-41

Qaqortoq Stadium, Qaqortoq

=== Final ===
30 August 1993

B-67 Nuuk	1–0	Kissaviarsuk-33

Qaqortoq Stadium, Qaqortoq

== See also ==
- Football in Greenland
- Football Association of Greenland
- Greenland national football team
- Greenlandic Men's Football Championship
