= 1990 Greenlandic Men's Football Championship =

- Season: 1990
- Champions: Nuuk IL (5th title)

The 1990 Greenlandic Men's Football Championship was the 20th edition of the Greenlandic Men's Football Championship. The final round was held in Nuuk. It was won by Nuuk IL for the fifth time in its history.

== First round ==
=== Group A ===
Pos	Team	Pld	W	D	L	GF	GA	GD	Pts	Qualification or relegation
1	Narsaq-85	2	2	0	0	9	1	+8	4	1990 Greenlandic Men's Football Championship Second round
2	Arsaq-50	2	1	0	1	8	8	0	2	
3	Siuteroq Nanortalik-43	2	0	0	2	4	12	−8	0	

=== Group B ===
Pos	Team	Pld	W	D	L	GF	GA	GD	Pts	Qualification or relegation
1	Kissaviarsuk-33	4	3	1	0	9	2	+7	7	1990 Greenlandic Men's Football Championship Second round
2	Nagtoralik Paamiut	4	3	1	0	10	4	+6	7	1990 Greenlandic Men's Football Championship Second round
3	Iliarsuk Qeqertarsuatsiaat	4	1	1	2	14	8	+6	3	
4	Pameeq Arsuk	4	0	2	2	0	6	−6	2	
5	QAA-Qaqortoq	4	0	1	3	2	15	−13	1	

=== Group C ===
Pos	Team	Pld	W	D	L	GF	GA	GD	Pts	Qualification or relegation
1	Aqigssiaq Maniitsoq	2	1	1	0	4	3	+1	3	1990 Greenlandic Men's Football Championship Second round
2	Kagssagssuk Maniitsoq	2	0	1	1	3	4	−1	1	

=== Group D ===
Pos	Team	Pld	W	D	L	GF	GA	GD	Pts	Qualification or relegation
1	Nagdlunguaq-48	2	2	0	0	4	2	+2	4	1990 Greenlandic Men's Football Championship Second round
2	R-77 Oqaatsut	2	0	1	1	5	6	−1	1	
3	Ilulissat-69	2	0	1	1	3	4	−1	1	

=== Group E ===
Pos	Team	Pld	W	D	L	GF	GA	GD	Pts	Qualification or relegation
1	Siumut Amerdlok Kunuk	4	3	0	1	16	4	+12	6	1990 Greenlandic Men's Football Championship Second round
2	Sisimiut-68	4	2	1	1	12	7	+5	5	
3	Siumut Amerdlok Kunuk B	4	0	1	3	5	22	−17	1	

=== Group F ===
Pos	Team	Pld	W	D	L	GF	GA	GD	Pts	Qualification or relegation
1	Tupilak-41	3	3	0	0	9	3	+6	6	1990 Greenlandic Men's Football Championship Second round
2	Akunnaaq-51	3	2	0	1	5	2	+3	4	
3	Ippernaq-53	3	0	1	2	5	9	−4	1	
4	Kangaatsiaq BK 84	3	0	1	2	4	9	−5	1	

== Second round ==
=== Group A ===
Pos	Team	Pld	W	D	L	GF	GA	GD	Pts	Qualification or relegation
1	Nuuk IL	4	4	0	0	40	4	+36	8	1990 Greenlandic Men's Football Championship Final Round
2	B-67 Nuuk	3	2	0	1	21	5	+16	4	
3	A.T.A.-60	3	1	0	2	19	12	+7	2	
4	Nuuk IL B	3	1	0	2	6	9	−3	2	
5	SK-51	3	0	0	3	0	56	−56	0	

^{NB} Two match results are unavailable.

=== Group B ===
Pos	Team	Pld	W	D	L	GF	GA	GD	Pts	Qualification or relegation
1	Aqigssiaq Maniitsoq	2	2	0	0	7	2	+5	4	1990 Greenlandic Men's Football Championship Final Round
2	Siumut Amerdlok Kunuk	2	0	0	2	4	7	−3	0	

=== Group C ===
Pos	Team	Pld	W	D	L	GF	GA	GD	Pts	Qualification or relegation
1	Kissaviarsuk-33	2	1	1	0	4	3	+1	3	1990 Greenlandic Men's Football Championship Final Round
2	Nagtoralik Paamiut	2	0	2	0	5	5	0	2	
3	Narsaq-85	2	0	1	1	4	5	−1	1	

=== Group D ===
Pos	Team	Pld	W	D	L	GF	GA	GD	Pts	Qualification or relegation
1	Disko-76	3	1	2	0	7	4	+3	4	1990 Greenlandic Men's Football Championship Final Round
2	Tupilak-41	3	1	2	0	4	2	+2	4	1990 Greenlandic Men's Football Championship Final Round
3	Kugsak-45	3	1	1	1	6	4	+2	3	
4	Nagdlunguaq-48	3	0	1	2	2	9	−7	1	

=== Group E ===
Pos	Team	Pld	W	D	L	GF	GA	GD	Pts	Qualification or relegation
1	FC Malamuk	4	3	1	0	16	8	+8	7	1990 Greenlandic Men's Football Championship Final Round
2	Qimmeq-45	4	1	2	1	7	7	0	4	
3	Umanak BK 68	4	0	1	3	3	11	−8	1	

== Final round ==
=== Pool 1 ===
Pos	Team	Pld	W	D	L	GF	GA	GD	Pts	Qualification or relegation
1	Kissaviarsuk-33	2	2	0	0	7	1	+6	4	1990 Greenlandic Men's Football Championship Semi-finals
2	Disko-76	2	1	0	1	4	4	0	2	1990 Greenlandic Men's Football Championship Semi-finals
3	FC Malamuk	2	0	0	2	1	7	−6	0	1990 Greenlandic Men's Football Championship Fifth Place Match

19 August 1990

Kissaviarsuk-33	3–1	Disko-76

Nuuk Stadium, Nuuk

20 August 1990

Kissaviarsuk-33	4–0	FC Malamuk

Nuuk Stadium, Nuuk

21 August 1990

FC Malamuk	1–3	Disko-76

Nuuk Stadium, Nuuk

=== Pool 2 ===
Pos	Team	Pld	W	D	L	GF	GA	GD	Pts	Qualification or relegation
1	Nuuk IL	2	1	1	0	8	3	+5	3	1990 Greenlandic Men's Football Championship Semi-finals
2	Aqigssiaq Maniitsoq	2	1	1	0	6	3	+3	3	1990 Greenlandic Men's Football Championship Semi-finals
3	Tupilak-41	2	0	0	2	2	10	−8	0	1990 Greenlandic Men's Football Championship Fifth Place Match

19 August 1990

Nuuk IL	6–1	Tupilak-41

Nuuk Stadium, Nuuk

20 August 1990

Nuuk IL	2–2	Aqigssiaq Maniitsoq

Nuuk Stadium, Nuuk

21 August 1990

Aqigssiaq Maniitsoq	4–1	Tupilak-41

Nuuk Stadium, Nuuk

== Playoffs ==
=== Semi-finals ===
23 August 1990

Kissaviarsuk-33	1–2	Aqigssiaq Maniitsoq

Nuuk Stadium, Nuuk
23 August 1990

Nuuk IL	4–3	Disko-76

Nuuk Stadium, Nuuk

=== Fifth-place match ===
24 August 1990

Tupilak-41	2–1	FC Malamuk

Nuuk Stadium, Nuuk

=== Third place match ===
24 August 1990

Kissaviarsuk-33	4–2	Disko-76

Nuuk Stadium, Nuuk

=== Final ===
25 August 1990

Nuuk IL	6–0	Aqigssiaq Maniitsoq

Nuuk Stadium, Nuuk

== See also ==
- Football in Greenland
- Football Association of Greenland
- Greenland national football team
- Greenlandic Men's Football Championship
