= 2002 Greenlandic Men's Football Championship =

2002 Coca Cola GM
- Season: 2002
- Champions: Kugsak-45 (2nd title)

The 2002 Coca-Cola GM was the 32nd edition of the Greenlandic Men's Football Championship. The final round was held in Ilulissat, Greenland. It was won by Kugsak-45 for the second time in its history.

== Qualifying stage ==
=== North Greenland ===
Pos	Team	Pld	W	D	L	GF	GA	GD	Pts	Qualification or relegation
1	FC Malamuk	3	3	0	0	16	3	+13	9	2002 Coca Cola GM Final Round
2	Umanak BK 68	3	2	0	1	12	3	+9	6	
3	Ukaleq-55	3	1	0	2	4	12	−8	3	
4	Amaroq Saattut	3	0	0	3	3	17	−14	0	

=== Disko Bay ===
Pos	Team	Pld	W	D	L	GF	GA	GD	Pts	Qualification or relegation
1	Kugsak-45	3	3	0	0	14	1	+13	9	2002 Coca Cola GM Final Round
2	Disko-76	3	2	0	1	10	5	+5	6	
3	Ilulissat-69	3	1	0	2	7	6	+1	3	
4	Tupilak-41	3	0	0	3	2	21	−19	0	

=== Central Greenland ===
==== Pool A ====
Pos	Team	Pld	W	D	L	GF	GA	GD	Pts	Qualification or relegation
1	Siumut Amerdlok Kunuk	3	3	0	0	24	2	+22	9	2002 Coca Cola GM Final Round
2	Kangaatsiaq Ippernaq-53	3	2	0	1	12	15	−3	6	
3	Siumut Amerdlok Kunuk B	3	1	0	2	7	20	−13	3	
4	Arfeq-85	3	0	0	3	6	12	−6	0	

==== Pool B ====
Pos	Team	Pld	W	D	L	GF	GA	GD	Pts	Qualification or relegation
1	B-67 Nuuk	6	6	0	0	29	4	+25	18	2002 Coca Cola GM Final Round
2	Nuuk IL	6	3	1	2	30	6	+24	10	2002 Coca Cola GM Final Round
3	Nuuk IL B	6	3	1	2	23	16	+7	10	
4	Kagssagssuk Maniitsoq	6	3	1	2	14	14	0	10	
5	B-67 Nuuk B	6	3	0	3	29	17	+12	9	
6	Nuuk IL C	6	1	1	4	16	34	−18	4	
7	GSS Nuuk	6	0	0	6	6	56	−50	0	

=== East Greenland ===
Pos	Team	Pld	W	D	L	GF	GA	GD	Pts	Qualification or relegation
1	A.T.A.-60	4	4	0	0	43	2	+41	12	2002 Coca Cola GM Final Round
2	Kuummiut-64	4	2	0	2	14	19	−5	6	
3	A.T.A.-60 B	4	2	0	2	9	14	−5	6	
4	A.T.A.-60 C	4	2	0	2	10	23	−13	6	
5	Kuummiut-64 B	4	0	0	4	9	27	−18	0	

=== South Greenland ===
Pos	Team	Pld	W	D	L	GF	GA	GD	Pts	Qualification or relegation
1	Narsaq-85	2	2	0	0	11	3	+8	6	2002 South Greenland Playoff
2	Kissaviarsuk-33	2	1	0	1	7	4	+3	3	
3	Siuteroq Nanortalik-43	2	0	0	2	2	13	−11	0	

==== Playoff ====
Narsaq-85	w/o	Nagtoralik Paamiut

Narsaq-85 qualified for the final Round.
Nagtoralik Paamiut withdrew.

== Final round ==
=== Pool 1 ===
Pos	Team	Pld	W	D	L	GF	GA	GD	Pts	Qualification or relegation
1	Nagdlunguaq-48	3	3	0	0	11	1	+10	9	2002 Coca Cola GM Semi-finals
2	Narsaq-85	3	2	0	1	11	9	+2	6	2002 Coca Cola GM Semi-finals
3	Siumut Amerdlok Kunuk	3	1	0	2	7	10	−3	3	2002 Coca Cola GM Fifth Place Match
4	FC Malamuk	3	0	0	3	6	15	−9	0	2002 Coca Cola GM Seventh Place Match

FC Malamuk	0–5	Nagdlunguaq-48

Ilulissat Stadium, Ilulissat

Narsaq-85	5–2	Siumut Amerdlok Kunuk

Ilulissat Stadium, Ilulissat

FC Malamuk	2–4	Siumut Amerdlok Kunuk

Ilulissat Stadium, Ilulissat

Narsaq-85	0–3	Nagdlunguaq-48

Ilulissat Stadium, Ilulissat

FC Malamuk	4–6	Narsaq-85

Ilulissat Stadium, Ilulissat

Nagdlunguaq-48	3–1	Siumut Amerdlok Kunuk

Ilulissat Stadium, Ilulissat

=== Pool 2 ===
Pos	Team	Pld	W	D	L	GF	GA	GD	Pts	Qualification or relegation
1	Kugsak-45	3	3	0	0	7	3	+4	9	2002 Coca Cola GM Semi-finals
2	B-67 Nuuk	3	1	1	1	4	4	0	4	2002 Coca Cola GM Semi-finals
3	A.T.A.-60	3	0	2	1	6	7	−1	2	2002 Coca Cola GM Fifth Place Match
4	Nuuk IL	3	0	1	2	7	10	−3	1	2002 Coca Cola GM Seventh Place Match

Kugsak-45	3–1	B-67 Nuuk

Ilulissat Stadium, Ilulissat

Nuuk IL	5–5	A.T.A.-60

Ilulissat Stadium, Ilulissat

Kugsak-45	2–1	Nuuk IL

Ilulissat Stadium, Ilulissat

A.T.A.-60	0–0	B-67 Nuuk

Ilulissat Stadium, Ilulissat

Kugsak-45	2–1	A.T.A.-60

Ilulissat Stadium, Ilulissat

Nuuk IL	1–3	B-67 Nuuk

Ilulissat Stadium, Ilulissat

== Playoffs ==
=== Semi-finals ===
Nagdlunguaq-48	2–3	B-67 Nuuk

Ilulissat Stadium, Ilulissat

Kugsak-45	4–2	Narsaq-85

Ilulissat Stadium, Ilulissat

=== Seventh-place match ===
Nuuk IL	2–0	FC Malamuk

Ilulissat Stadium, Ilulissat

=== Fifth-place match ===
A.T.A.-60	2–1	Siumut Amerdlok Kunuk

Ilulissat Stadium, Ilulissat

=== Third-place match ===
Nagdlunguaq-48	4–1	Narsaq-85

Ilulissat Stadium, Ilulissat

=== Final ===
Kugsak-45	3–1	B-67 Nuuk

Ilulissat Stadium, Ilulissat

== See also ==
- Football in Greenland
- Football Association of Greenland
- Greenland national football team
- Greenlandic Men's Football Championship
