= 1991 Greenlandic Men's Football Championship =

- Season: 1991
- Champions: Kissaviarsuk-33 (6th title)

The 1991 Greenlandic Men's Football Championship was the 21st edition of the Greenlandic Men's Football Championship. The final round was held in Sisimiut. It was won by Kissaviarsuk-33 for the sixth time in its history.

== Qualifying stage ==
=== Disko Bay ===
All matches were played in Aasiaat.

Pos	Team	Pld	W	D	L	GF	GA	GD	Pts	Qualification or relegation
1	Ilulissat-69	6	5	0	1	20	9	+11	10	1991 Greenlandic Men's Football Championship Final Round
2	Tupilak-41	6	5	0	1	16	5	+11	10	1991 Greenlandic Men's Football Championship Final Round
3	Disko-76	6	4	0	2	16	5	+11	8	
4	Kugsak-45	6	3	0	3	13	8	+5	6	
5	Umanak BK 68	6	3	0	3	16	13	+3	6	
6	CIF-70 Qasigiannguit	6	1	0	5	3	24	−21	2	
7	Akunnaaq-51	6	0	0	6	7	27	−20	0	

=== Central Greenland ===
==== Group A ====
All matches were played in Nuuk.

Pos	Team	Pld	W	D	L	GF	GA	GD	Pts	Qualification or relegation
1	B-67 Nuuk	4	2	1	1	7	4	+3	5	1991 Greenlandic Men's Football Championship Final Round
2	Aqigssiaq Maniitsoq	4	1	3	0	9	8	+1	5	1991 Greenlandic Men's Football Championship Final Round
3	Nuuk IL B	4	1	2	1	8	8	0	4	
4	Nagtoralik Paamiut	4	0	3	1	6	7	−1	3	
5	Nuuk IL	4	0	3	1	6	9	−3	3	

==== Group B ====
All matches were played in Sisimiut.

Pos	Team	Pld	W	D	L	GF	GA	GD	Pts	Qualification or relegation
1	Siumut Amerdlok Kunuk	4	2	2	0	15	3	+12	7	1991 Greenlandic Men's Football Championship Final Round
2	Sisimiut-68	4	2	2	0	15	4	+11	6	
3	Siumut Amerdlok Kunuk B	4	0	0	4	3	26	−23	0	

=== South Greenland ===
All matches were played in Qaqortoq.

Pos	Team	Pld	W	D	L	GF	GA	GD	Pts	Qualification or relegation
1	Kissaviarsuk-33	3	3	0	0	21	1	+20	6	1991 Greenlandic Men's Football Championship Final Round
2	Siuteroq Nanortalik-43	3	1	1	1	8	15	−7	3	
3	Arsaq-50	3	1	1	1	3	11	−8	3	
4	Narsaq-85	3	0	0	3	7	12	−5	0	

== Final round ==
=== Pool 1 ===
Pos	Team	Pld	W	D	L	GF	GA	GD	Pts	Qualification or relegation
1	Kissaviarsuk-33	2	1	1	0	5	3	+2	3	1991 Greenlandic Men's Football Championship Semi-finals
2	Tupilak-41	2	1	1	0	3	2	+1	3	1991 Greenlandic Men's Football Championship Semi-finals
3	Ilulissat-69	2	0	0	2	5	8	−3	0	1991 Greenlandic Men's Football Championship Fifth Place Match

26 August 1991

Tupilak-41	3–2	Ilulissat-69

Nuuk Stadium, Nuuk

27 August 1991

Tupilak-41	0–0	Kissaviarsuk-33

Nuuk Stadium, Nuuk

28 August 1991

Ilulissat-69	3–5	Kissaviarsuk-33

Nuuk Stadium, Nuuk

=== Pool 2 ===
Pos	Team	Pld	W	D	L	GF	GA	GD	Pts	Qualification or relegation
1	Aqigssiaq Maniitsoq	2	1	1	0	4	2	+2	3	1991 Greenlandic Men's Football Championship Semi-finals
2	B-67 Nuuk	2	1	0	1	3	3	0	2	1991 Greenlandic Men's Football Championship Semi-finals
3	Siumut Amerdlok Kunuk	2	0	1	1	3	5	−2	1	1991 Greenlandic Men's Football Championship Fifth Place Match

26 August 1991

Siumut Amerdlok Kunuk	2–2	Aqigssiaq Maniitsoq

Nuuk Stadium, Nuuk

27 August 1991

Siumut Amerdlok Kunuk	1–3	B-67 Nuuk

Nuuk Stadium, Nuuk

28 August 1991

B-67 Nuuk	0–2	Aqigssiaq Maniitsoq

Nuuk Stadium, Nuuk

== Playoffs ==
=== Semi-finals ===
30 August 1991

Aqigssiaq Maniitsoq	4–1	Tupilak-41

Nuuk Stadium, Nuuk
30 August 1991

Kissaviarsuk-33	3–0	B-67 Nuuk

Nuuk Stadium, Nuuk

=== Fifth-place match ===
29 August 1991

Siumut Amerdlok Kunuk	2–1	Ilulissat-69

Nuuk Stadium, Nuuk

=== Third-place match ===
31 August 1991

Tupilak-41	3–0	B-67 Nuuk

Nuuk Stadium, Nuuk

=== Final ===
31 August 1991

Kissaviarsuk-33	2–1	Aqigssiaq Maniitsoq

Nuuk Stadium, Nuuk

== See also ==
- Football in Greenland
- Football Association of Greenland
- Greenland national football team
- Greenlandic Men's Football Championship
