= 1989 Greenlandic Men's Football Championship =

- Season: 1989
- Champions: Kagssagssuk Maniitsoq (1st title)

The 1989 Greenlandic Men's Football Championship was the 19th edition of the Greenlandic Men's Football Championship. The final round was held in Qaqortoq. It was won by Kagssagssuk Maniitsoq for the first time in its history.

== Qualifying stage ==
=== North Greenland ===
All matches were played in Uummannaq.

Pos	Team	Pld	W	D	L	GF	GA	GD	Pts	Qualification or relegation
1	FC Malamuk	2	2	0	0	18	1	+17	4	1989 Greenlandic Men's Football Championship Final Round
2	Umanak BK 68	2	1	0	1	6	12	−6	2	
3	Upernavik BK 83	2	0	0	2	5	16	−11	0	

=== Disko Bay ===
All matches were played in Qasigiannguit.

Pos	Team	Pld	W	D	L	GF	GA	GD	Pts	Qualification or relegation
1	Kugsak-45	5	4	1	0	16	7	+9	9	1989 Greenlandic Men's Football Championship Final Round
2	Nagdlunguaq-48	5	2	2	1	18	12	+6	6	1989 Greenlandic Men's Football Championship Final Round
3	Tupilak-41	5	3	0	2	14	17	−3	6	
4	Disko-76	5	1	2	2	7	9	−2	4	
5	G-44 Qeqertarsuaq	5	1	2	2	6	8	−2	4	
6	Ilulissat-69	5	0	1	4	7	15	−8	1	

=== Central Greenland ===
All matches were played in Sisimiut.

Pos	Team	Pld	W	D	L	GF	GA	GD	Pts	Qualification or relegation
1	Kagssagssuk Maniitsoq	5	3	2	0	20	6	+14	8	1989 Greenlandic Men's Football Championship Final Round
2	Nuuk IL	5	3	1	1	25	10	+15	7	1989 Greenlandic Men's Football Championship Final Round
3	Sisimiut-68	5	3	0	2	29	17	+12	6	1989 Greenlandic Men's Football Championship Final Round
4	Nuuk IL B	5	2	2	1	19	12	+7	6	
5	Siumut Amerdlok Kunuk	5	1	1	3	14	15	−1	3	
6	Qaasuk Kangaamiut	5	0	0	5	2	49	−47	0	

=== South Greenland ===
All matches were played in Narsaq.

Pos	Team	Pld	W	D	L	GF	GA	GD	Pts	Qualification or relegation
1	Narsaq-85	3	3	0	0	17	1	+16	6	1989 Greenlandic Men's Football Championship Final Round
2	Nagtoralik Paamiut	3	2	0	1	14	2	+12	4	
3	Arsaq-50	3	1	0	2	6	11	−5	2	
4	Nagtoralik Paamiut B	3	0	0	3	1	24	−23	0	

^{NB} Kissaviarsuk-33 qualified for the final Round as hosts.

== Final round ==
=== Pool 1 ===
Pos	Team	Pld	W	D	L	GF	GA	GD	Pts	Qualification or relegation
1	Nagdlunguaq-48	3	3	0	0	10	4	+6	6	1989 Greenlandic Men's Football Championship Semi-finals
2	Kissaviarsuk-33	3	2	0	1	10	4	+6	4	1989 Greenlandic Men's Football Championship Semi-finals
3	FC Malamuk	3	0	1	2	8	14	−6	1	1989 Greenlandic Men's Football Championship Fifth Place Match
4	Sisimiut-68	3	0	1	2	7	13	−6	1	1989 Greenlandic Men's Football Championship Seventh Place Match

3 September 1989

Kissaviarsuk-33	3–1	Sisimiut-68

Qaqortoq Stadium, Qaqortoq
3 September 1989

FC Malamuk	2–3	Nagdlunguaq-48

Qaqortoq Stadium, Qaqortoq

4 September 1989

Sisimiut-68	1–5	Nagdlunguaq-48

Qaqortoq Stadium, Qaqortoq

5 September 1989

Kissaviarsuk-33	6–1	FC Malamuk

Qaqortoq Stadium, Qaqortoq

6 September 1989

Sisimiut-68	5–5	FC Malamuk

Qaqortoq Stadium, Qaqortoq
6 September 1989

Kissaviarsuk-33	1–2	Nagdlunguaq-48

Qaqortoq Stadium, Qaqortoq

=== Pool 2 ===
Pos	Team	Pld	W	D	L	GF	GA	GD	Pts	Qualification or relegation
1	Nuuk IL	3	3	0	0	24	5	+19	6	1989 Greenlandic Men's Football Championship Semi-finals
2	Kagssagssuk Maniitsoq	3	1	1	1	5	5	0	3	1989 Greenlandic Men's Football Championship Semi-finals
3	Kugsak-45	3	1	0	2	3	9	−6	2	1989 Greenlandic Men's Football Championship Fifth Place Match
4	Narsaq-85	3	0	1	2	1	14	−13	1	1989 Greenlandic Men's Football Championship Seventh Place Match

3 September 1989

Narsaq-85	1–1	Kagssagssuk Maniitsoq

Qaqortoq Stadium, Qaqortoq

4 September 1989

Narsaq-85	0–1	Kugsak-45

Qaqortoq Stadium, Qaqortoq
4 September 1989

Nuuk IL	4–3	Kagssagssuk Maniitsoq

Qaqortoq Stadium, Qaqortoq

5 September 1989

Narsaq-85	0–12	Nuuk IL

Qaqortoq Stadium, Qaqortoq
5 September 1989

Kugsak-45	0–1	Kagssagssuk Maniitsoq

Qaqortoq Stadium, Qaqortoq

6 September 1989

Kugsak-45	2–8	Nuuk IL

Qaqortoq Stadium, Qaqortoq

== Playoffs ==
=== Semi-finals ===
8 September 1989

Nagdlunguaq-48	0–1	Kagssagssuk Maniitsoq

Qaqortoq Stadium, Qaqortoq
8 September 1989

Nuuk IL	1–3	Kissaviarsuk-33

Qaqortoq Stadium, Qaqortoq

=== Seventh-place match ===
9 September 1989

Narsaq-85	6–1	Sisimiut-68

Qaqortoq Stadium, Qaqortoq

=== Fifth-place match ===
9 September 1989

Kugsak-45	2–1	FC Malamuk

Qaqortoq Stadium, Qaqortoq

=== Third-place match ===
10 September 1989

Nuuk IL	10–2	Nagdlunguaq-48

Qaqortoq Stadium, Qaqortoq

=== Final ===
10 September 1989

Kagssagssuk Maniitsoq	3–0	Kissaviarsuk-33

Qaqortoq Stadium, Qaqortoq

== See also ==
- Football in Greenland
- Football Association of Greenland
- Greenland national football team
- Greenlandic Men's Football Championship
