= 2001 Greenlandic Men's Football Championship =

2001 Coca Cola GM
- Season: 2001
- Champions: Nagdlunguaq-48 (8th title)

The 2001 Coca-Cola GM was the 31st edition of the Greenlandic Men's Football Championship. The final round was held in Sisimiut. It was won by Nagdlunguaq-48 for the eighth time in its history.

== Qualifying stage ==
=== North Greenland ===
Pos	Team	Pld	W	D	L	GF	GA	GD	Pts	Qualification or relegation
1	FC Malamuk	3	3	0	0	16	5	+11	9	2001 Coca Cola GM Final Round
2	Upernavik BK 83	3	2	0	1	8	9	−1	6	
3	Umanak BK 68	3	0	1	2	5	8	−3	1	
4	Eqaluk-56	3	0	1	2	5	12	−7	1	

=== Disko Bay ===
Pos	Team	Pld	W	D	L	GF	GA	GD	Pts	Qualification or relegation
1	Kugsak-45	4	3	1	0	18	4	+14	10	2001 Coca Cola GM Final Round
2	Nagdlunguaq-48	4	3	1	0	16	6	+10	10	2001 Coca Cola GM Final Round
3	Tupilak-41	4	1	0	3	12	16	−4	3	
4	Kangaatsiaq Ippernaq-53	4	1	0	3	7	13	−6	3	
5	Disko-76	4	1	0	3	7	21	−14	3	

=== Central Greenland ===
Pos	Team	Pld	W	D	L	GF	GA	GD	Pts	Qualification or relegation
1	Nuuk IL	5	5	0	0	10	4	+6	15	2001 Coca Cola GM Final Round
2	Siumut Amerdlok Kunuk	5	3	1	1	6	1	+5	10	2001 Coca Cola GM Final Round
3	Kagssagssuk Maniitsoq	5	3	1	1	9	5	+4	10	2001 Coca Cola GM Final Round
4	B-67 Nuuk	5	2	0	3	7	5	+2	6	
5	Niaqornaarsuk-88	5	1	0	4	3	10	−7	3	
6	Sisimiut-68	5	0	0	5	6	16	−10	0	

=== East Greenland ===
A.T.A.-60 qualified for the South Greenland Round.

=== South Greenland ===
Pos	Team	Pld	W	D	L	GF	GA	GD	Pts	Qualification or relegation
1	Narsaq-85	4	3	0	1	14	6	+8	9	2001 Coca Cola GM Final Round
2	Kissaviarsuk-33	4	2	2	0	11	7	+4	8	2001 Coca Cola GM Final Round
3	A.T.A.-60	4	0	3	1	8	10	−2	3	
4	Nagtoralik Paamiut	4	0	3	1	7	12	−5	3	
5	Siuteroq Nanortalik-43	4	0	2	2	11	16	−5	2	

== Final round ==
=== Pool 1 ===
Pos	Team	Pld	W	D	L	GF	GA	GD	Pts	Qualification or relegation
1	Kugsak-45	3	2	1	0	9	4	+5	7	2001 Coca Cola GM Semi-finals
2	FC Malamuk	3	1	2	0	7	6	+1	5	2001 Coca Cola GM Semi-finals
3	Siumut Amerdlok Kunuk	3	1	0	2	4	6	−2	3	2001 Coca Cola GM Fifth Place Match
4	Kissaviarsuk-33	3	0	1	2	5	9	−4	1	2001 Coca Cola GM Seventh Place Match

FC Malamuk	2–2	Kugsak-45

Sisimiut Stadium, Sisimiut

Siumut Amerdlok Kunuk	2–1	Kissaviarsuk-33

Sisimiut Stadium, Sisimiut

FC Malamuk	2–1	Siumut Amerdlok Kunuk

Sisimiut Stadium, Sisimiut

Kugsak-45	4–1	Kissaviarsuk-33

Sisimiut Stadium, Sisimiut

Kugsak-45	3–1	Siumut Amerdlok Kunuk

Sisimiut Stadium, Sisimiut

FC Malamuk	3–3	Kissaviarsuk-33

Sisimiut Stadium, Sisimiut

=== Pool 2 ===
Pos	Team	Pld	W	D	L	GF	GA	GD	Pts	Qualification or relegation
1	Nagdlunguaq-48	3	3	0	0	10	1	+9	9	2001 Coca Cola GM Semi-finals
2	Nuuk IL	3	2	0	1	8	5	+3	6	2001 Coca Cola GM Semi-finals
3	Narsaq-85	3	1	0	2	5	4	+1	3	2001 Coca Cola GM Fifth Place Match
4	Kagssagssuk Maniitsoq	3	0	0	3	0	13	−13	0	2001 Coca Cola GM Seventh Place Match

Kagssagssuk Maniitsoq	0–3	Narsaq-85

Sisimiut Stadium, Sisimiut

Nagdlunguaq-48	3–1	Nuuk IL

Sisimiut Stadium, Sisimiut

Kagssagssuk Maniitsoq	0–4	Nuuk IL

Sisimiut Stadium, Sisimiut

Nagdlunguaq-48	1–0	Narsaq-85

Sisimiut Stadium, Sisimiut

Nuuk IL	3–2	Narsaq-85

Sisimiut Stadium, Sisimiut

Nagdlunguaq-48	6–0	Kagssagssuk Maniitsoq

Sisimiut Stadium, Sisimiut

== Playoffs ==
=== Semi-finals ===
24 August 2001

Kugsak-45	7–1	Nuuk IL

Sisimiut Stadium, Sisimiut
24 August 2001

Nagdlunguaq-48	8–0	FC Malamuk

Sisimiut Stadium, Sisimiut

=== Seventh-place match ===
24 August 2001

Kissaviarsuk-33	3–5	Kagssagssuk Maniitsoq

Sisimiut Stadium, Sisimiut

=== Fifth-place match ===
25 August 2001

Siumut Amerdlok Kunuk	3–0	Narsaq-85

Sisimiut Stadium, Sisimiut

=== Third place match ===
25 August 2001

FC Malamuk	2–1	Nuuk IL

Sisimiut Stadium, Sisimiut

=== Final ===
25 August 2001

Nagdlunguaq-48	2–1	Kugsak-45

Sisimiut Stadium, Sisimiut

== See also ==
- Football in Greenland
- Football Association of Greenland
- Greenland national football team
- Greenlandic Men's Football Championship
