= 1995 Greenlandic Men's Football Championship =

25th edition of the Greenlandic Men's Football Championship

- Season: 1995
- Champions: Kugsak-45 (1st title)

The 1995 Greenlandic Men's Football Championship was the 25th edition of the Greenlandic Men's Football Championship. The final round was held in Sisimiut. It was won by Kugsak-45 for the first time in its history.

== Qualifying stage ==
=== North Greenland ===
Pos	Team	Pld	W	D	L	GF	GA	GD	Pts	Qualification or relegation
1	FC Malamuk	3	3	0	0	9	4	+5	9	1995 Greenlandic Men's Football Championship Final Round
2	Umanak BK 68	3	2	0	1	9	8	+1	6	
3	Upernavik BK 83	3	0	1	2	5	8	−3	1	
4	Kingmeq-45	3	0	1	2	4	7	−3	1	

=== Disko Bay ===
Pos	Team	Pld	W	D	L	GF	GA	GD	Pts	Qualification or relegation
1	Kugsak-45	5	3	2	0	15	4	+11	11	1995 Greenlandic Men's Football Championship Final Round
2	Nagdlunguaq-48	5	3	2	0	13	6	+7	11	1995 Greenlandic Men's Football Championship Final Round
3	Disko-76	5	3	1	1	11	9	+2	10	
4	Ilulissat-69	5	2	1	2	7	13	−6	7	
5	Ilimanaq Ippernaq-53	5	1	0	4	5	12	−7	3	
6	Kangaatsiaq Ippernaq-53	4	0	1	3	3	10	−7	1	

=== Central Greenland ===
==== Group A ====
Pos	Team	Pld	W	D	L	GF	GA	GD	Pts	Qualification or relegation
1	B-67 Nuuk	4	2	1	1	10	4	+6	7	1995 Greenlandic Men's Football Championship Final Round
2	Kagssagssuk Maniitsoq	4	2	1	1	6	3	+3	7	1995 Greenlandic Men's Football Championship Final Round
3	Nuuk IL	4	2	0	2	6	9	−3	6	
4	Nagtoralik Paamiut	4	2	0	2	7	11	−4	6	
5	A.T.A.-60	4	1	0	3	6	8	−2	3	

==== Group B ====
Pos	Team	Pld	W	D	L	GF	GA	GD	Pts	Qualification or relegation
1	Siumut Amerdlok Kunuk	3	3	0	0	9	3	+6	9	1995 Greenlandic Men's Football Championship Final Round
2	Aqigssiaq Maniitsoq	3	2	0	1	5	2	+3	6	
3	B-67 Nuuk B	3	1	0	2	7	10	−3	3	
4	Nuuk IL B	3	0	0	3	1	7	−6	0	

=== South Greenland ===
Pos	Team	Pld	W	D	L	GF	GA	GD	Pts	Qualification or relegation
1	Kissaviarsuk-33	8	6	1	1	25	10	+15	19	1995 Greenlandic Men's Football Championship Final Round
2	FC Nanortalik	8	5	2	1	19	15	+4	17	
3	QAA-Qaqortoq	8	3	0	5	10	12	−2	9	
4	Narsaq-85	8	2	1	5	14	18	−4	7	
5	Kissaviarsuk-33 B	8	0	4	4	6	19	−13	4	

=== Last Chance Qualifier ===
Pos	Team	Pld	W	D	L	GF	GA	GD	Pts	Qualification or relegation
1	Akunnaaq-51	3	2	1	0	6	2	+4	7	1995 Greenlandic Men's Football Championship Final Round
2	Arsaq-50	3	2	0	1	6	4	+2	6	
3	Kamik-79	3	1	0	2	5	8	−3	3	
4	Kangaamiut-85	3	0	1	2	5	8	−3	1	

== Final round ==
=== Pool 1 ===
Pos	Team	Pld	W	D	L	GF	GA	GD	Pts	Qualification or relegation
1	Kugsak-45	3	3	0	0	14	5	+9	9	1995 Greenlandic Men's Football Championship Semi-finals
2	Kissaviarsuk-33	3	2	0	1	16	9	+7	6	1995 Greenlandic Men's Football Championship Semi-finals
3	Kagssagssuk Maniitsoq	3	1	0	2	7	10	−3	3	1995 Greenlandic Men's Football Championship Fifth Place Match
4	FC Malamuk	3	0	0	3	5	18	−13	0	1995 Greenlandic Men's Football Championship Seventh Place Match

27 August 1995

Kugsak-45	6–0	FC Malamuk

Sisimiut Stadium, Sisimiut
27 August 1995

Kissaviarsuk-33	5–1	Kagssagssuk Maniitsoq

Sisimiut Stadium, Sisimiut

28 August 1995

Kugsak-45	5–4	Kissaviarsuk-33

Sisimiut Stadium, Sisimiut
28 August 1995

FC Malamuk	2–5	Kagssagssuk Maniitsoq

Sisimiut Stadium, Sisimiut

29 August 1995

Kugsak-45	3–1	Kagssagssuk Maniitsoq

Sisimiut Stadium, Sisimiut
29 August 1995

FC Malamuk	3–7	Kissaviarsuk-33

Sisimiut Stadium, Sisimiut

=== Pool 2 ===
Pos	Team	Pld	W	D	L	GF	GA	GD	Pts	Qualification or relegation
1	B-67 Nuuk	3	2	1	0	9	4	+5	7	1995 Greenlandic Men's Football Championship Semi-finals
2	Siumut Amerdlok Kunuk	3	2	0	1	4	4	0	6	1995 Greenlandic Men's Football Championship Semi-finals
3	Nagdlunguaq-48	3	1	0	2	7	8	−1	3	1995 Greenlandic Men's Football Championship Fifth Place Match
4	Akunnaaq-51	3	0	1	2	6	10	−4	1	1995 Greenlandic Men's Football Championship Seventh Place Match

27 August 1995

Nagdlunguaq-48	1–2	Siumut Amerdlok Kunuk

Sisimiut Stadium, Sisimiut
27 August 1995

B-67 Nuuk	3–3	Akunnaaq-51

Sisimiut Stadium, Sisimiut

28 August 1995

Nagdlunguaq-48	1–4	B-67 Nuuk

Sisimiut Stadium, Sisimiut
28 August 1995

Siumut Amerdlok Kunuk	2–1	Akunnaaq-51

Sisimiut Stadium, Sisimiut

29 August 1995

Nagdlunguaq-48	5–2	Akunnaaq-51

Sisimiut Stadium, Sisimiut
29 August 1995

Siumut Amerdlok Kunuk	0–2	B-67 Nuuk

Sisimiut Stadium, Sisimiut

== Playoffs ==
=== Semi-finals ===
30 August 1995

Kugsak-45	4–0	Siumut Amerdlok Kunuk

Sisimiut Stadium, Sisimiut
30 August 1995

B-67 Nuuk	0–1	Kissaviarsuk-33

Sisimiut Stadium, Sisimiut

=== Seventh-place match ===
31 August 1995

FC Malamuk	6–2	Akunnaaq-51

Sisimiut Stadium, Sisimiut

=== Fifth-place match ===
31 August 1995

Nagdlunguaq-48	3–3 (a.e.t.)	Kagssagssuk Maniitsoq
Penalties
	4–1

Sisimiut Stadium, Sisimiut

=== Third-place match ===
1 September 1995

Siumut Amerdlok Kunuk	1–0	B-67 Nuuk

Sisimiut Stadium, Sisimiut

=== Final ===
1 September 1995

Kugsak-45	4–2	Kissaviarsuk-33

Sisimiut Stadium, Sisimiut
Attendance: 1500

== See also ==
- Football in Greenland
- Football Association of Greenland
- Greenland national football team
- Greenlandic Men's Football Championship
