= 2010 Greenlandic Men's Football Championship =

2010 Coca Cola GM
- Season: 2010
- Champions: B-67 Nuuk (7th title)

The 2010 Coca-Cola GM was the 40th edition of the Greenlandic Men's Football Championship. The final round was held in Nuuk from 16 to 21 August. It was won by B-67 Nuuk for the seventh time in its history.

== Qualifying stage ==
=== North Greenland ===
Pos	Team	Pld	W	D	L	GF	GA	GD	Pts	Qualification or relegation
1	FC Malamuk	4	4	0	0	20	4	+16	12	2010 Coca Cola GM Final Round
2	Kingmeq-45	4	2	1	1	9	8	+1	7	2010 Coca Cola GM Final Round
3	Eqaluk-56	4	2	0	2	9	8	+1	6	
4	Umanak BK 68	4	1	1	2	6	15	−9	4	
5	Amaroq Saattut	4	0	0	4	6	15	−9	0	

=== Disko Bay ===
Pos	Team	Pld	W	D	L	GF	GA	GD	Pts	Qualification or relegation
1	Nagdlunguaq-48	2	2	0	0	10	4	+6	6	2010 Coca Cola GM Final Round
2	G-44 Qeqertarsuaq	2	1	0	1	8	7	+1	3	2010 Coca Cola GM Final Round
3	Kugsak-45	2	1	0	1	4	4	0	3	
4	Akunnaaq-51	2	0	0	2	1	8	−7	0	

^{NB} Some match results are unavailable.

=== Central Greenland ===
Pos	Team	Pld	W	D	L	GF	GA	GD	Pts	Qualification or relegation
1	B-67 Nuuk	3	3	0	0	15	3	+12	9	2010 Coca Cola GM Final Round
2	Kagssagssuk Maniitsoq	3	2	0	1	5	10	−5	6	
3	Kangaamiut-85	3	1	0	2	7	7	0	3	
4	Siumut Amerdlok Kunuk	3	0	0	3	3	10	−7	0	

^{NB} Nuuk IL qualified for the final Round as hosts.

=== South Greenland ===
Pos	Team	Pld	W	D	L	GF	GA	GD	Pts	Qualification or relegation
1	Narsaq-85	3	3	0	0	16	0	+16	9	2010 Coca Cola GM Final Round
2	Kissaviarsuk-33	4	2	1	1	-	-	—	7	2010 Coca Cola GM Final Round
3	Eqaluk-54	4	2	1	1	13	3	+10	7	
4	Nagtoralik Paamiut	3	1	0	2	10	9	+1	3	
5	Siuteroq Nanortalik-43	3	0	0	3	1	33	−32	0	

^{NB} Some match results are unavailable.

== Final round ==
=== Pool 1 ===
Pos	Team	Pld	W	D	L	GF	GA	GD	Pts	Qualification or relegation
1	B-67 Nuuk	3	3	0	0	14	1	+13	9	2010 Coca Cola GM Semi-finals
2	G-44 Qeqertarsuaq	3	2	0	1	6	3	+3	6	2010 Coca Cola GM Semi-finals
3	Kissaviarsuk-33	3	1	0	2	3	15	−12	3	2010 Coca Cola GM Fifth Place Match
4	FC Malamuk	3	0	0	3	1	5	−4	0	2010 Coca Cola GM Seventh Place Match

16 August 2010

G-44 Qeqertarsuaq	2–0	FC Malamuk

Nuuk Stadium, Nuuk
16 August 2010

B-67 Nuuk	11–0	Kissaviarsuk-33

Nuuk Stadium, Nuuk

17 August 2010

FC Malamuk	1–2	Kissaviarsuk-33

Nuuk Stadium, Nuuk
17 August 2010

G-44 Qeqertarsuaq	1–2	B-67 Nuuk

Nuuk Stadium, Nuuk

18 August 2010

G-44 Qeqertarsuaq	3–1	Kissaviarsuk-33

Nuuk Stadium, Nuuk
18 August 2010

FC Malamuk	0–1	B-67 Nuuk

Nuuk Stadium, Nuuk

=== Pool 2 ===
Pos	Team	Pld	W	D	L	GF	GA	GD	Pts	Qualification or relegation
1	Nagdlunguaq-48	3	3	0	0	20	3	+17	9	2010 Coca Cola GM Semi-finals
2	Nuuk IL	3	2	0	1	9	5	+4	6	2010 Coca Cola GM Semi-finals
3	Narsaq-85	3	1	0	2	9	9	0	3	2010 Coca Cola GM Fifth Place Match
4	Kingmeq-45	3	0	0	3	1	22	−21	0	2010 Coca Cola GM Seventh Place Match

16 August 2010

Kingmeq-45	0–6	Nuuk IL

Nuuk Stadium, Nuuk
16 August 2010

Narsaq-85	2–6	Nagdlunguaq-48

Nuuk Stadium, Nuuk

17 August 2010

Narsaq-85	6–0	Kingmeq-45

Nuuk Stadium, Nuuk
17 August 2010

Nagdlunguaq-48	4–0	Nuuk IL

Nuuk Stadium, Nuuk

18 August 2010

Narsaq-85	1–3	Nuuk IL

Nuuk Stadium, Nuuk
18 August 2010

Nagdlunguaq-48	10–1	Kingmeq-45

Nuuk Stadium, Nuuk

== Playoffs ==
=== Semi-finals ===
20 August 2010

B-67 Nuuk	4–0	Nuuk IL

Nuuk Stadium, Nuuk
20 August 2010

Nagdlunguaq-48	0–2	G-44 Qeqertarsuaq

Nuuk Stadium, Nuuk

=== Seventh-place match ===
20 August 2010

FC Malamuk	9–1	Kingmeq-45

Nuuk Stadium, Nuuk

=== Fifth-place match ===
20 August 2010

Kissaviarsuk-33	3–1	Narsaq-85

Nuuk Stadium, Nuuk

=== Third-place match ===
21 August 2010

Nagdlunguaq-48	3–0	Nuuk IL

Nuuk Stadium, Nuuk

=== Final ===
21 August 2010

B-67 Nuuk	5–0	G-44 Qeqertarsuaq

Nuuk Stadium, Nuuk

== See also ==
- Football in Greenland
- Football Association of Greenland
- Greenland national football team
- Greenlandic Men's Football Championship
