= 1980 Greenlandic Men's Football Championship =

- Season: 1980
- Champions: Nagdlunguaq-48 (3rd title)

The 1980 Greenlandic Men's Football Championship was the tenth edition of the Greenlandic Men's Football Championship. The final round was held in Qaqortoq. It was won by Nagdlunguaq-48 for the third time in its history.

== Final round ==
=== Pool 1 ===
Pos	Team	Pld	W	D	L	GF	GA	GD	Pts	Qualification or relegation
1	Nagdlunguaq-48	2	1	1	0	5	2	+3	3	1980 Greenlandic Men's Football Championship Semi-finals
2	CIF-70 Qasigiannguit	2	1	0	1	2	3	−1	2	1980 Greenlandic Men's Football Championship Semi-finals
3	Nagtoralik Paamiut	2	0	1	1	2	4	−2	1	1980 Greenlandic Men's Football Championship Fifth Place Match

30 July 1980

CIF-70 Qasigiannguit	2–0	Nagdlunguaq-48

Qaqortoq Stadium, Qaqortoq

31 July 1980

CIF-70 Qasigiannguit	0–3	Nagtoralik Paamiut

Qaqortoq Stadium, Qaqortoq

1 August 1980

Nagdlunguaq-48	2–2	Nagtoralik Paamiut

Qaqortoq Stadium, Qaqortoq

=== Pool 2 ===
Pos	Team	Pld	W	D	L	GF	GA	GD	Pts	Qualification or relegation
1	Siumut Amerdlok Kunuk	2	1	1	0	3	2	+1	3	1980 Greenlandic Men's Football Championship Semi-finals
2	Nuuk IL	2	1	0	1	6	4	+2	2	1980 Greenlandic Men's Football Championship Semi-finals
3	Kissaviarsuk-33	2	0	1	1	3	6	−3	1	1980 Greenlandic Men's Football Championship Fifth Place Match

30 July 1980

Nuuk IL	5–2	Kissaviarsuk-33

Qaqortoq Stadium, Qaqortoq

31 July 1980

Nuuk IL	1–2	Siumut Amerdlok Kunuk

Qaqortoq Stadium, Qaqortoq

1 August 1980

Kissaviarsuk-33	1–1	Siumut Amerdlok Kunuk

Qaqortoq Stadium, Qaqortoq

== Playoffs ==
=== Semi-finals ===
3 August 1980

Nagdlunguaq-48	3–1	Nuuk IL

Qaqortoq Stadium, Qaqortoq
3 August 1980

Siumut Amerdlok Kunuk	3–0	CIF-70 Qasigiannguit

Qaqortoq Stadium, Qaqortoq

=== Fifth-place match ===
4 August 1980

Kissaviarsuk-33	2–2 (a.e.t.)	Nagtoralik Paamiut
Penalties
	5–4

Qaqortoq Stadium, Qaqortoq

=== Third place match ===
5 August 1980

CIF-70 Qasigiannguit	2–0	Nuuk IL

Qaqortoq Stadium, Qaqortoq

=== Final ===
5 August 1980

Siumut Amerdlok Kunuk	2–2 (a.e.t.)	Nagdlunguaq-48
Penalties
	4–5

Qaqortoq Stadium, Qaqortoq

== See also ==
- Football in Greenland
- Football Association of Greenland
- Greenland national football team
- Greenlandic Men's Football Championship
