= 2022 Greenlandic Football Championship =

2022 GrønlandsBANKEN GM
- Season: 2022
- Dates: 18 July 2022 – 13 August 2022
- Champions: Nagdlunguaq-48 (12th title)
- Matches: 38
- Goals: 190 (5 per match)
- Biggest home win: Nagdlunguaq-48 10–1 UB-83 Upernavik (8 August 2022)
- Biggest away win: N-71 Nuussuaq 1–8 UB-83 Upernavik (24 July 2022)

The 2022 GrønlandsBANKEN GM is the 52nd edition of the Greenlandic Football Championship. The final round was held in Ilulissat from 8 to 13 August. It was won by Nagdlunguaq-48 for the twelfth time in its history.

== Qualifying stage ==
Location of teams of the 2022 Greenlandic Football Championship.

=== Avannaata ===
All matches in Uummannaq.

Pos	Team	Pld	W	D	L	GF	GA	GD	Pts	Qualification	UB83	FCM	N71	E56	I69
1	UB-83 Upernavik	2	2	0	0	12	4	+8	6	Qualification for Final round					
2	FC Malamuk	2	0	1	1	5	6	−1	1		3–4		2–2		
3	N-71 Nuussuaq	2	0	1	1	3	10	−7	1		1–8				
4	Eqaluk-56	0	0	0	0	0	0	0	0	Withdrew					
5	Ilulissat-69	0	0	0	0	0	0	0	0	Withdrew					

Legend: Blue = home team win; Yellow = draw; Red = away team win.

=== Qeqertalik ===
All matches in Qeqertarsuaq

Pos	Team	Pld	W	D	L	GF	GA	GD	Pts	Qualification	G44	T41	FCA
1	G-44 Qeqertarsuaq	2	2	0	0	10	1	+9	6	Qualification for Final round		8–1	
2	Tupilak-41 (Note: Ammassalimmi Timersoqatigiiffik Ammassak (A.T.A.) (Tasiilaq) qualified without having entered qualifying, presumably as the only entrants from Østgrønland; however, they withdrew and were replaced by Tupilak-41, runners-up Qeqertalik)	2	0	0	2	1	10	−9	0	Qualification for Final round	0–2		
3	Aqisseq Kangaatsiaq	0	0	0	0	0	0	0	0	Withdrew			

Legend: Blue = home team win; Yellow = draw; Red = away team win.

=== Qeqqata ===
All matches in Maniitsoq

Pos	Team	Pld	W	D	L	GF	GA	GD	Pts	Qualification	SAK	AQM
1	Siumut Amerdlok Kunuk	2	1	0	1	7	5	+2	3	Qualification for Final round		5–1
2	Aqigssiaq Maniitsoq	2	1	0	1	5	7	−2	3		4–2	

Legend: Blue = home team win; Yellow = draw; Red = away team win.

=== Sermersooq ===
All matches in Nuuk

Pos	Team	Pld	W	D	L	GF	GA	GD	Pts	Qualification	B67	IT79	N45	FCN	NIL
1	B-67 Nuuk	4	4	0	0	17	2	+15	12	Qualification for Final round		4–1	6–1		3–0 (Note: Awarded 3–0)
2	Inuit Timersoqatigiiffiat-79	4	3	0	1	14	9	+5	9	Qualification for Final round					8–1
3	Nagtoralik-45	4	2	0	2	13	11	+2	6			3–2			5–3
4	FC Nuuk	4	1	0	3	6	13	−7	3		0–4	0–5	1–2		5–2
5	Nuuk IL	4	0	0	4	6	21	−15	0						

Legend: Blue = home team win; Yellow = draw; Red = away team win.

=== Kujalleq ===
Apparently, only Kissaviarsuk-33 registered, thus qualifying automatically.

== Final round ==
All matches in Ilulissat

=== Qualified teams ===
Region	Team
City host (Ilulissat)	Nagdlunguaq-48
Avannaata	UB-83 Upernavik
Qeqertalik	G-44 Qeqertarsuaq
Qeqertalik	Tupilak-41
Qeqqata	Siumut Amerdlok Kunuk
Sermersooq	B-67 Nuuk
Sermersooq	Inuit Timersoqatigiiffiat-79
Kujalleq	Kissaviarsuk-33

=== Group 1 ===
Pos	Team	Pld	W	D	L	GF	GA	GD	Pts	Qualification	G44	IT79	K33	SAK
1	G-44 Qeqertarsuaq	3	3	0	0	13	4	+9	9	Advanced to semi-finals				
2	Inuit Timersoqatigiiffiat-79	3	2	0	1	13	5	+8	6	Advanced to semi-finals				
3	Kissaviarsuk-33	3	0	1	2	3	11	−8	1	Advanced to placement play-offs				
4	Siumut Amerdlok Kunuk	3	0	1	2	4	13	−9	1	Advanced to placement play-offs				

Legend: Blue = home team win; Yellow = draw; Red = away team win.
8 August 2022

Inuit Timersoqatigiiffiat-79	2–4	G-44 Qeqertarsuaq

Ilulissat Stadium, Ilulissat
8 August 2022

Kissaviarsuk-33	1–1	Siumut Amerdlok Kunuk

Ilulissat Stadium, Ilulissat
9 August 2022

G-44 Qeqertarsuaq	4–1	Siumut Amerdlok Kunuk

Ilulissat Stadium, Ilulissat
9 August 2022

Inuit Timersoqatigiiffiat-79	4–0	Kissaviarsuk-33

Ilulissat Stadium, Ilulissat
10 August 2022

Inuit Timersoqatigiiffiat-79	7–1	Siumut Amerdlok Kunuk

Ilulissat Stadium, Ilulissat
10 August 2022

G-44 Qeqertarsuaq	5–1	Kissaviarsuk-33

Ilulissat Stadium, Ilulissat

=== Group 2 ===
Pos	Team	Pld	W	D	L	GF	GA	GD	Pts	Qualification	N48	B67	T41	UB83
1	Nagdlunguaq-48 (H)	3	3	0	0	14	1	+13	9	Advanced to semi-finals				
2	B-67 Nuuk	3	2	0	1	12	1	+11	6	Advanced to semi-finals				
3	Tupilak-41	3	1	0	2	6	11	−5	3	Advanced to placement play-offs				
4	UB-83 Upernavik	3	0	0	3	4	23	−19	0	Advanced to placement play-offs				

Legend: Blue = home team win; Yellow = draw; Red = away team win.
(H) Hosts
8 August 2022

Nagdlunguaq-48	10–1	UB-83 Upernavik

Ilulissat Stadium, Ilulissat
9 August 2022

B-67 Nuuk	7–0	UB-83 Upernavik

Ilulissat Stadium, Ilulissat
9 August 2022

Nagdlunguaq-48	3–0	Tupilak-41

Ilulissat Stadium, Ilulissat
10 August 2022

UB-83 Upernavik	3–6	Tupilak-41

Ilulissat Stadium, Ilulissat
10 August 2022

B-67 Nuuk	0–1	Nagdlunguaq-48

Ilulissat Stadium, Ilulissat
11 August 2022

B-67 Nuuk	5–0	Tupilak-41

Ilulissat Stadium, Ilulissat

== Playoffs ==
=== Semi-finals ===
Semi-finals
12 August — Ilulissat
G-44 Qeqertarsuaq	0
B-67 Nuuk	6
12 August — Ilulissat
Nagdlunguaq-48	2
Inuit Timersoqatigiiffiat-79	1

Final
13 August — Ilulissat
B-67 Nuuk	2 (5)
Nagdlunguaq-48 (p)	2 (6)
Third place
13 August — Ilulissat
G-44 Qeqertarsuaq	0
Inuit Timersoqatigiiffiat-79	5

==== Semi-finals ====
12 August 2022

G-44 Qeqertarsuaq	0–6	B-67 Nuuk
		Nikki Petersen 2', 58'; Søren Kreutzmann 23', 32', 40'; Ari Hermann 43'

Ilulissat Stadium, Ilulissat
12 August 2022

Nagdlunguaq-48	2–1 (a.e.t.)	Inuit Timersoqatigiiffiat-79
Kunuuteeraq Isaksen 90'; Rene Eriksen Petersen 111'		Jørgen Kreutzmann 86'

Ilulissat Stadium, Ilulissat

==== Third-place match ====
13 August 2022

G-44 Qeqertarsuaq	0–5	Inuit Timersoqatigiiffiat-79
		Hans-Karl Berthelsen 4', 23'; Mika Thyssen 12'; Marco Leibhardt 39'; Thomas Geisler 88'

Ilulissat Stadium, Ilulissat

==== Final ====
13 August 2022

Nagdlunguaq-48	2–2 (a.e.t.)	B-67 Nuuk
Kunuuteeraq Isaksen 90'; Rene Eriksen Petersen 120+2'		Søren Kreutzmann 18'; Niklas Thorleifsen 111'
Penalties
	6–5

Ilulissat Stadium, Ilulissat

=== Placement playoff matches ===
Semi-finals
Ilulissat
Kissaviarsuk-33	3
UB-83 Upernavik	4
Ilulissat
Tupilak-41	1 (0)
Siumut Amerdlok Kunuk (p)	1 (3)

Fifth place
Ilulissat
UB-83 Upernavik	3 (2)
Siumut Amerdlok Kunuk (p)	3 (4)
Seventh place
Ilulissat
Kissaviarsuk-33	2
Tupilak-41	0

==== Semi-finals ====
12 August 2022

Kissaviarsuk-33	3–4	UB-83 Upernavik

Ilulissat Stadium, Ilulissat
12 August 2022

Tupilak-41	1–1 (a.e.t.)	Siumut Amerdlok Kunuk
Penalties
	0–3

Ilulissat Stadium, Ilulissat

==== Seventh-place match ====
13 August 2022

Kissaviarsuk-33	2–0	Tupilak-41

Ilulissat Stadium, Ilulissat

==== Fifth-place match ====
13 August 2022

UB-83 Upernavik	3–3 (a.e.t.)	Siumut Amerdlok Kunuk
Penalties
	2–4

Ilulissat Stadium, Ilulissat

== Top goalscorers ==
As of 13 August 2022

Rank	Scorer	Club	Goals
1	(Greenland) Søren Kreutzmann	B-67 Nuuk	4
2	(Greenland) Nikki Petersen	B-67 Nuuk	2
2	(Greenland) Kunuuteeraq Isaksen	Nagdlunguaq-48	2
2	(Greenland) Rene Eriksen Petersen	Nagdlunguaq-48	2
2	(Greenland) Hans-Karl Berthelsen	Inuit Timersoqatigiiffiat-79	2

== Tournament ranking ==
Pos	Team	Pld	W	D	L	GF	GA	GD	Pts
1	Nagdlunguaq-48	5	4	1	0	18	4	+14	13
2	B-67 Nuuk	5	3	1	1	20	3	+17	10
3	Inuit Timersoqatigiiffiat-79	5	3	0	2	19	7	+12	9
4	G-44 Qeqertarsuaq	5	3	0	2	13	15	−2	9
5	Siumut Amerdlok Kunuk	5	0	3	2	8	17	−9	3
6	UB-83 Upernavik	5	1	1	3	11	29	−18	4
7	Kissaviarsuk-33	5	1	1	3	8	15	−7	4
8	Tupilak-41	5	1	1	3	7	14	−7	4

== See also ==
- Football in Greenland
- Football Association of Greenland
- Greenland national football team
- Greenlandic Men's Football Championship
