= 2003 Greenlandic Men's Football Championship =

2003 Coca Cola GM
- Season: 2003
- Champions: Kissaviarsuk-33 (8th title)

The 2003 Coca-Cola GM was the 33rd edition of the Greenlandic Men's Football Championship. The final round was held in Qaqortoq, Greenland. It was won by Kissaviarsuk-33 for the eighth time in its history.

== Qualifying stage ==
=== North Greenland ===
Pos	Team	Pld	W	D	L	GF	GA	GD	Pts	Qualification or relegation
1	FC Malamuk	4	2	2	0	30	5	+25	8	2003 North Greenland Playoff
2	Umanak BK 68	4	2	2	0	30	5	+25	8	2003 North Greenland Playoff
3	Kangersuatsiaq FC	4	0	0	4	4	54	−50	0	

==== Playoff ====
FC Malamuk	5–2	Umanak BK 68

FC Malamuk qualified for the final Round.

=== Disko Bay ===
Pos	Team	Pld	W	D	L	GF	GA	GD	Pts	Qualification or relegation
1	Disko-76	4	3	0	1	23	2	+21	9	2003 Coca Cola GM Final Round
2	Kugsak-45	4	3	0	1	23	3	+20	9	2003 Coca Cola GM Final Round
3	Nagdlunguaq-48	4	3	0	1	22	2	+20	9	
4	Ilulissat-69	4	1	0	3	6	10	−4	3	
5	Kangaatsiaq Ippernaq-53	4	0	0	4	1	58	−57	0	

=== Central Greenland ===
Pos	Team	Pld	W	D	L	GF	GA	GD	Pts	Qualification or relegation
1	B-67 Nuuk	3	3	0	0	15	2	+13	9	2003 Coca Cola GM Final Round
2	Kagssagssuk Maniitsoq	3	1	1	1	8	7	+1	4	2003 Coca Cola GM Final Round
3	Nuuk IL	3	1	1	1	7	6	+1	4	
4	Itelleq-87	3	0	0	3	5	20	−15	0	

=== East Greenland ===
Pos	Team	Pld	W	D	L	GF	GA	GD	Pts	Qualification or relegation
1	A.T.A.-60	4	4	0	0	43	0	+43	12	2003 Coca Cola GM Final Round
2	TM-62	4	3	0	1	39	7	+32	9	
3	A.T.A.-60 B	4	2	0	2	20	16	+4	6	
4	TM-62 B	4	1	0	3	20	18	+2	3	
5	A.T.A.-60 C	4	0	0	4	3	84	−81	0	

=== South Greenland ===
Pos	Team	Pld	W	D	L	GF	GA	GD	Pts	Qualification or relegation
1	Kissaviarsuk-33	5	4	1	0	24	3	+21	13	2003 Coca Cola GM Final Round
2	Narsaq-85	5	4	1	0	22	2	+20	13	2003 Coca Cola GM Final Round
3	Nagtoralik Paamiut	5	3	2	0	16	8	+8	11	
4	Siuteroq Nanortalik-43	5	2	0	3	9	16	−7	6	
5	Qavaq Aappilattoq	5	0	1	4	5	23	−18	1	
6	Eqaluk-54	5	0	1	4	4	28	−24	1	

== Final round ==
=== Pool 1 ===
Pos	Team	Pld	W	D	L	GF	GA	GD	Pts	Qualification or relegation
1	Narsaq-85	3	2	1	0	9	5	+4	7	2003 Coca Cola GM Semi-finals
2	Kugsak-45	3	2	0	1	12	5	+7	6	2003 Coca Cola GM Semi-finals
3	A.T.A.-60	3	1	1	1	6	10	−4	4	
4	Kagssagssuk Maniitsoq	3	0	0	3	4	11	−7	0	

Kagssagssuk Maniitsoq	2–3	A.T.A.-60

Qaqortoq Stadium, Qaqortoq

Kugsak-45	2–3	Narsaq-85

Qaqortoq Stadium, Qaqortoq

Kagssagssuk Maniitsoq	0–3	Narsaq-85

Qaqortoq Stadium, Qaqortoq

Kugsak-45	5–0	A.T.A.-60

Qaqortoq Stadium, Qaqortoq

Kagssagssuk Maniitsoq	2–5	Kugsak-45

Qaqortoq Stadium, Qaqortoq

Narsaq-85	3–3	A.T.A.-60

Qaqortoq Stadium, Qaqortoq

=== Pool 2 ===
Pos	Team	Pld	W	D	L	GF	GA	GD	Pts	Qualification or relegation
1	B-67 Nuuk	3	2	1	0	11	4	+7	7	2003 Coca Cola GM Semi-finals
2	Kissaviarsuk-33	3	2	1	0	9	4	+5	7	2003 Coca Cola GM Semi-finals
3	Disko-76	3	1	0	2	5	9	−4	3	
4	FC Malamuk	3	0	0	3	6	14	−8	0	

FC Malamuk	2–5	Kissaviarsuk-33

Qaqortoq Stadium, Qaqortoq

Disko-76	0–5	B-67 Nuuk

Qaqortoq Stadium, Qaqortoq

FC Malamuk	2–5	Disko-76

Qaqortoq Stadium, Qaqortoq

Kissaviarsuk-33	2–2	B-67 Nuuk

Qaqortoq Stadium, Qaqortoq

FC Malamuk	2–4	B-67 Nuuk

Qaqortoq Stadium, Qaqortoq

Kissaviarsuk-33	2–0	Disko-76

Qaqortoq Stadium, Qaqortoq

== Playoffs ==
=== Semi-finals ===
A.T.A.-60	1–2	FC Malamuk

Qaqortoq Stadium, Qaqortoq

Disko-76	3–4	Kagssagssuk Maniitsoq

Qaqortoq Stadium, Qaqortoq

Narsaq-85	2–3	Kissaviarsuk-33

Qaqortoq Stadium, Qaqortoq

B-67 Nuuk	2–3	Kugsak-45

Qaqortoq Stadium, Qaqortoq

=== Seventh-place match ===
A.T.A.-60	5–4	Disko-76

Qaqortoq Stadium, Qaqortoq

=== Fifth-place match ===
Kagssagssuk Maniitsoq	3–2	FC Malamuk

Qaqortoq Stadium, Qaqortoq

=== Third-place match ===
B-67 Nuuk	3–0	Narsaq-85

Qaqortoq Stadium, Qaqortoq

=== Final ===
Kissaviarsuk-33	5–2	Kugsak-45

Qaqortoq Stadium, Qaqortoq

== See also ==
- Football in Greenland
- Football Association of Greenland
- Greenland national football team
- Greenlandic Men's Football Championship
