= 1954–55 Greenlandic Football Championship =

Greenlandic Football Championship
- Season: 1954–55
- Champions: Nuuk Idraetslag (1st title)
- Biggest home win: Nuuk Idraetslag 15–4 Aassik-43
- Biggest away win: Nagdlunguaq-48 1–17 Nuuk Idraetslag
- Highest scoring: Nuuk Idraetslag 15–4 Aassik-43

The 1954–55 Greenlandic Football Championship (also known as the Danish: Fodboldturneringen Grønlandturneringen, Fodboldmesterskab i Grønland or Greenlandic: Angutit Inersimasut GM) was the first edition of the Greenlandic Men's Football Championship. The final round was held in Ilulissat. It was won by Nuuk Idraetslag who defeated Nagdlunguaq-48 in the final.

== Background ==
The first federation to organise a national football championship in Greenland was the GIF (Danish: Grønlands Idrætsforening), a general sports federation that organised more than just football tournaments, founded on 3 September 1953 at a meeting attended by eleven clubs from Upernavik, Uummannaq, Qeqertarsuatsiaat, Qasigiannguit, Aasiaat, Sisimiut, Maniitsoq, Nuuk, Paamiut and Qaqortoq. The 1954–55 tournament was the first national football tournament and GIF continued to organise the competition, usually announced as Fodboldturneringen, Grønlandturneringen or Fodboldmesterskab i Grønland, until 1970. For the first decade of its existence, the tournament was held sporadically, with iterations often taking more than a year to complete. In 1971 a football specific federation, the Football Association of Greenland (Greenlandic: Kalaallit Nunaanni Isikkamik Arsaattartut Kattuffiat; Danish: Grønlands Boldspil-Union), was founded, and took over the organisation of the tournament.

== Competing teams ==
Location of teams participating in the 1954–55 Greenlandic Men's Football Championship. Red dots indicate confirmed participating team, blue dots indicate possible participating teams.

In total, 22 clubs registered for the tournament who were usually denoted by their home towns in newspaper reports rather than their club name. However, the two finalists were definitely the club sides Nuuk Idraetslag and Nagdlunguaq-48. Known participants are listed below:

- Aassik-43, Narsaq
- Kissaviarsuk-33, Qaqortoq
- Nagdlunguaq-48, Ilulissat
- Nanok-50, Qullissat
- Nuuk Idraetslag, Nuuk
- Siumut Amerdlok Kunuk, Sisimiut
- Tupilak-41, Aasiaat

Possible participants:

- Akavsak, Aamaruutissat
- KSP, Qeqertarsuaq

N.B.: On 19 April 1954, Akavsak, from the town of Aamaruutissat, which was abandoned in 1965 played KSP from Qeqertarsuaq. It is not clear whether that match was part of the tournament. Additionally, on 8 April 1955 a team from Qullissat (presumably Nanok) won 4–1 against a team from Aamaruutissat (presumably Âkavsak). Again, it is not clear whether that match was part of the tournament.

== Format ==
The competitions was divided into two sections, a north section (Danish: Nordkredsen), known to have been played as a single group and a southern section (Danish: Sydkredsen), known to have been divided into two groups. The top two teams in each group in the southern section played each other with the winners qualifying for a regional final to determine the entrant to the grand final. The northern section also featured at least two knockout rounds to determine their entrant. The final was played as a one off match.

== Recorded results ==
Qualifying finals
Nanok-50	2
Nagdlunguaq-48	3
T-41	W
Unknown	L
SAK	2
Nuuk IL	3
Aassik-43	3
Kissaviarsuk-33	2

Semi finals
Nagdlunguaq-48	7
T-41	0
Nuuk IL	15
Aassik-43	4

Final
Nagdlunguaq-48	1
Nuuk IL	17

=== Pulje I/II (Sydkredsen) ===
Pulje I Final

Aassik-43	3–2	Kissaviarsuk-33
	Report

Pulje II Final

Nuuk Idraetslag	3–2	Siumut Amerdlok Kunuk
	Report

11 November 1954
Sydkredsen Final

Nuuk Idraetslag	15–4	Aassik-43
	Report

Nuuk

=== Pulje III (Nordkredsen) ===
Nordkredsen semi-final

Nanok-50	2–3	Nagdlunguaq-48
	Report

Nordkredsen final

Nagdlunguaq-48	7–0	Tupilak-41
	Report

N.B.: The Nanok / Nagdlunguaq-48 was a replay after the initial game was annulled following a 3–2 win for Nanok.

=== Final ===
8 November 1955

Nagdlunguaq-48	1–17	Nuuk Idraetslag
	Report

Ilulissat

1954–55 Greenlandic Football Championship

Nuuk Idraetslag
First Title
