= 1992 Greenlandic Men's Football Championship =

- Season: 1992
- Champions: Aqigssiaq Maniitsoq (1st title)

The 1992 Greenlandic Men's Football Championship was the 22nd edition of the Greenlandic Men's Football Championship. The final round was held in Ilulissat. It was won by Aqigssiaq Maniitsoq for the first time in its history.

== First round ==
=== Capital Region ===
Pos	Team	Pld	W	D	L	GF	GA	GD	Pts	Qualification or relegation
1	Nuuk IL	4	4	0	0	23	2	+21	8	1992 Greenlandic Men's Football Championship Second round
2	B-67 Nuuk	4	3	0	1	18	8	+10	6	1992 Greenlandic Men's Football Championship Second round
3	B-67 Nuuk B	4	2	0	2	11	8	+3	4	
4	Nuuk IL B	4	1	0	3	7	16	−9	2	
5	A.T.A.-60	4	0	0	4	7	32	−25	0	

== Second round ==
=== Group A ===
Disko-76 and FC Malamuk qualified for the final Round.

=== Group B ===
Nagdlunguaq-48 qualified for the final Round.

=== Group C ===
Aqigssiaq Maniitsoq qualified for the final Round.

=== Group D ===
Pos	Team	Pld	W	D	L	GF	GA	GD	Pts	Qualification or relegation
1	Nuuk IL	4	1	3	0	11	7	+4	5	1992 Greenlandic Men's Football Championship Final Round
2	B-67 Nuuk	4	1	3	0	10	7	+3	5	
3	Nagtoralik Paamiut	4	0	2	2	8	15	−7	2	

=== Group E ===
Pos	Team	Pld	W	D	L	GF	GA	GD	Pts	Qualification or relegation
1	Siuteroq Nanortalik-43	2	1	1	0	10	7	+3	3	1992 Greenlandic Men's Football Championship Final Round
2	Kissaviarsuk-33	2	0	2	0	5	5	0	2	
3	Narsaq-85	2	0	1	1	6	9	−3	1	

== Final round ==
=== Pool 1 ===
Pos	Team	Pld	W	D	L	GF	GA	GD	Pts	Qualification or relegation
1	Nuuk IL	2	1	1	0	5	3	+2	3	1992 Greenlandic Men's Football Championship Semi-finals
2	Nagdlunguaq-48	2	1	1	0	3	2	+1	3	1992 Greenlandic Men's Football Championship Semi-finals
3	Disko-76	2	0	0	2	5	8	−3	0	1992 Greenlandic Men's Football Championship Fifth Place Match

18 August 1992

Nuuk IL	3–2	Nagdlunguaq-48

Ilulissat Stadium, Ilulissat

19 August 1992

Nuuk IL	4–0	Disko-76

Ilulissat Stadium, Ilulissat

20 August 1992

Nagdlunguaq-48	3–1	Disko-76

Ilulissat Stadium, Ilulissat

=== Pool 2 ===
Pos	Team	Pld	W	D	L	GF	GA	GD	Pts	Qualification or relegation
1	Aqigssiaq Maniitsoq	2	1	1	0	4	2	+2	3	1992 Greenlandic Men's Football Championship Semi-finals
2	Siuteroq Nanortalik-43	2	1	0	1	3	3	0	2	1992 Greenlandic Men's Football Championship Semi-finals
3	FC Malamuk	2	0	1	1	3	5	−2	1	1992 Greenlandic Men's Football Championship Fifth Place Match

18 August 1992

Aqigssiaq Maniitsoq	4–0	FC Malamuk

Ilulissat Stadium, Ilulissat

19 August 1992

Aqigssiaq Maniitsoq	2–1	Siuteroq Nanortalik-43

Ilulissat Stadium, Ilulissat

20 August 1992

FC Malamuk	0–1	Siuteroq Nanortalik-43

Ilulissat Stadium, Ilulissat

== Playoffs ==
=== Semi-finals ===
22 August 1992

Nuuk IL	2–4	Siuteroq Nanortalik-43

Ilulissat Stadium, Ilulissat
22 August 1992

Aqigssiaq Maniitsoq	2–1	Nagdlunguaq-48

Ilulissat Stadium, Ilulissat

=== Fifth-place match ===
21 August 1992

Disko-76	4–1	FC Malamuk

Ilulissat Stadium, Ilulissat

=== Third place match ===
23 August 1992

Nuuk IL	1–3	Nagdlunguaq-48

Ilulissat Stadium, Ilulissat

=== Final ===
23 August 1992

Aqigssiaq Maniitsoq	12–0	Siuteroq Nanortalik-43

Ilulissat Stadium, Ilulissat

== See also ==
- Football in Greenland
- Football Association of Greenland
- Greenland national football team
- Greenlandic Men's Football Championship
