= 1959–60 Greenlandic Football Championship =

Greenlandic Football Championship
- Season: 1959–60
- Champions: Nanok-50 (1st title)
- Biggest home win: Siuteroq 20–5 Eqaluq (Tasiusaq)
- Biggest away win: Qalaq 0–21 Siuteroq
- Highest scoring: Siuteroq 20–5 Eqaluq (Tasiusaq)

The 1959–60 Greenlandic Football Championship (also known as the Danish: Fodboldturneringen Grønlandturneringen, Fodboldmesterskab i Grønland or Greenlandic: Angutit Inersimasut GM) was the third edition of the Greenlandic Men's Football Championship. Played on a knock-out basis, the final round was held at Gamle Sandbane in Nuuk. It was won by Nanok-50 who defeated Kissaviarsuk-33 in the final.

== Background ==
The first federation to organise a national football championship in Greenland was the GIF (Danish: Grønlands Idrætsforening), a general sports federation that organised more than just football tournaments, founded on 3 September 1953 at a meeting attended by eleven clubs from Upernavik, Uummannaq, Qeqertarsuatsiaat, Qasigiannguit, Aasiaat, Sisimiut, Maniitsoq, Nuuk, Paamiut and Qaqortoq. The 1954–55 tournament was the first national football tournament and GIF continued to organise the competition, usually announced as Fodboldturneringen, Grønlandturneringen or Fodboldmesterskab i Grønland, until 1970. For the first decade of its existence, the tournament was held sporadically, with iterations often taking more than a year to complete. In 1971 a football specific federation, the Football Association of Greenland (Greenlandic: Kalaallit Nunaanni Isikkamik Arsaattartut Kattuffiat; Danish: Grønlands Boldspil-Union), was founded, and took over the organisation of the tournament.

== Competing teams ==
Location of teams participating in the 1959–60 Greenlandic Men's Football Championship.
Disko Bay teams; Kujalleq teams; Nuuk area teams

A total of thirty four teams registered for the 1959–60 season of competition.

- Aassik-43, Narsaq
- Akunnaaq-51, Akunnaaq
- Arssak, Alluitsup Paa
- E-54, Tasiusaq
- E-56, Ikerasak
- GSS, Nuuk
- Iliarssuq, Qeqertarsuatsiaat
- Ipernaq, Ilimanaq
- Isungaq, Illorsuit
- K-33, Qaqortoq
- Kagssagssuk, Maniitsoq
- Kapisillit, Kapisillit
- Kigtorak, Narsaq
- KSP, Qeqertarsuaq
- Kugsak-45, Qasigiannguit
- Malamuk, Uummannaq
- Mingok, Kitsissuarsuit
- Nagdlunguaq-48, Ilulissat
- Nagtoraliq, Paamiut
- Nanok-50, Qullissat
- Narssarmiutaq, Ammassivik
- Nuuk IL, Nuuk
- Qalaleq, Niaqornat
- Qalaq, Narsarmijit
- Qasuq, Kangaamiut
- Qingmek, Upernavik
- Qingmiarak, Kullorsuaq
- Qoornoq, Qoornoq
- SAK, Sisimiut
- Sapitsoq, Napasoq
- Siuteroq, Nanortalik
- T-41, Aasiaat
- Tusilartoq, Kangeq
- Uiloq, Nivaaq

== Format ==
The tournament was played on a knock-out basis, with the teams divided into regional pools for the draw. As a result of this, the timing of matches was such that teams in certain areas were able to play their matches significantly more quickly than those in others. As a consequence of this, by the end of 1959, the various rounds of the competition do not tie to any overarching time frame and, by the end of 1959, Malamuk and K-33 had qualified for the semi-finals whilst the remaining quarter finals were still to be played.

== Recorded results ==
First preliminary round

Kagssagssuk	12–3	Qasuq
	Report

Second preliminary round

Kugsak-45	3–2	Ipernaq
	Report

Sapitsoq	3–12	Kagssagssuk
	Report

Qoornoq	def.	Kapisillit
	Report

Tusilartoq	18–0	Kigtorak
	Report

Competition proper

1/16 finals
Mingok
Akunnaaq-51	w/o
Uiloq	0
T-41	17
KSP	0
Nanok-50	4
Kugsak-45	1
Nagdlunguaq-48	4
Malamuk	5
E-56	0
Qalaleq	4
Isungaq	6
Qingmek	Bye
Qingmiarak	Bye
Kagssagssuk	1
SAK	5
Qoornoq	3
GSS	20
Nagtoraliq	1
Iliarssuq	7
Nuuk IL	11
Tusilartoq	0
Siuteroq	20
E-54	5
Qalaq	Bye
Narssarmiutaq	3
Arssak	1
K-33	17
Aassik-43	3

1/8 finals
Akunnaaq-51	1
T-41	2
Nanok-50	W
Nagdlunguaq-48	L
Malamuk	6
Isungaq	0
Qingmek	17
Qingmiarak	2
SAK	2
GSS	3
Iliarssuq	3
Nuuk IL	7
Siuteroq	21
Qalaq	0
Narssarmiutaq	0
K-33	3

Quarter finals
T-41	L
Nanok-50	W
Malamuk	W
Qingmek	L
GSS	Unk
Nuuk IL	Unk
Siuteroq	0
K-33	14

Semi finals
Nanok-50	W
Malamuk	L
Nuuk IL / GSS	L
K-33	W

Final
Nanok-50	W
K-33	L
