= 1958 Greenlandic Football Championship =

Greenlandic Football Championship
- Season: 1958
- Champions: Grønlands Seminarius Sportklub (1st title)

The 1958 Greenlandic Football Championship (also known as the Danish: Fodboldturneringen Grønlandturneringen, Fodboldmesterskab i Grønland or Greenlandic: Angutit Inersimasut GM) was the second edition of the Greenlandic Men's Football Championship. The final round was held in Qaqortoq. It was won by Grønlands Seminarius Sportklub who defeated Kissaviarsuk-33 in the final.

== Background ==
The first federation to organise a national football championship in Greenland was the GIF (Danish: Grønlands Idrætsforening), a general sports federation that organised more than just football tournaments, founded on 3 September 1953 at a meeting attended by eleven clubs from Upernavik, Uummannaq, Qeqertarsuatsiaat, Qasigiannguit, Aasiaat, Sisimiut, Maniitsoq, Nuuk, Paamiut and Qaqortoq. The 1954–55 tournament was the first national football tournament and GIF continued to organise the competition, usually announced as Fodboldturneringen, Grønlandturneringen or Fodboldmesterskab i Grønland, until 1970. For the first decade of its existence, the tournament was held sporadically, with iterations often taking more than a year to complete. In 1971 a football specific federation, the Football Association of Greenland (Greenlandic: Kalaallit Nunaanni Isikkamik Arsaattartut Kattuffiat; Danish: Grønlands Boldspil-Union), was founded, and took over the organisation of the tournament.

== Results ==
No results for the season are available, but it is known from reports on their 1972 and 1973 that Grønlands Seminarius Sportklub defeated Kissaviarsuk-33 in the final in Qaqortoq. There does appear to be a degree of confusion surrounding this season however; some reports into the 1966–67 season note that the final contested between Nanok and Kissaviarsuk-33 was the second meeting in the national final between these two clubs and that Nanok had been victorious in their first meeting in 1958. RSSSF suggest that this is an error and in fact refers to the following season which was indeed one by Nanok.

1958 Greenlandic Football Championship

Grønlands Seminarius Sportklub
First Title
