= 1981 Greenlandic Men's Football Championship =

- Season: 1981
- Champions: Nuuk IL (2nd title)

The 1981 Greenlandic Men's Football Championship was the 11th edition of the Greenlandic Men's Football Championship. The final round was held in Sisimiut. It was won by Nuuk IL for the second time in its history.

== Playoffs ==
=== Final ===
20 August 1981

Nuuk IL	4–1	Nagdlunguaq-48

Sisimiut Stadium, Sisimiut

== Final standings ==
Position	Team
1st	Nuuk IL
2nd	Nagdlunguaq-48
3rd	Siumut Amerdlok Kunuk
4th	B-67 Nuuk
5th	Umanak BK 68
6th	Kissaviarsuk-33

== See also ==
- Football in Greenland
- Football Association of Greenland
- Greenland national football team
- Greenlandic Men's Football Championship
