= 1998 Greenlandic Men's Football Championship =

- Season: 1998
- Champions: Kissaviarsuk-33 (7th title)

The 1998 Greenlandic Men's Football Championship was the 28th edition of the Greenlandic Men's Football Championship. The final round was held in Qaqortoq. It was won by Kissaviarsuk-33 for the seventh time in its history.

== Final round ==
=== Pool 1 ===
Pos	Team	Pld	W	D	L	GF	GA	GD	Pts	Qualification or relegation
1	Kissaviarsuk-33	3	3	0	0	11	5	+6	9	1998 Greenlandic Men's Football Championship Semi-finals
2	Nuuk IL	3	2	0	1	8	8	0	6	1998 Greenlandic Men's Football Championship Semi-finals
3	B-67 Nuuk	3	1	0	2	10	8	+2	3	1998 Greenlandic Men's Football Championship Fifth Place Match
4	A.T.A.-60	3	0	0	3	6	14	−8	0	1998 Greenlandic Men's Football Championship Seventh Place Match

20 August 1998

Kissaviarsuk-33	4–2	Nuuk IL

Qaqortoq Stadium, Qaqortoq
20 August 1998

B-67 Nuuk	7–2	A.T.A.-60

Qaqortoq Stadium, Qaqortoq

21 August 1998

Kissaviarsuk-33	4–2	A.T.A.-60

Qaqortoq Stadium, Qaqortoq
21 August 1998

Nuuk IL	3–2	B-67 Nuuk

Qaqortoq Stadium, Qaqortoq

22 August 1998

Nuuk IL	3–2	A.T.A.-60

Qaqortoq Stadium, Qaqortoq
22 August 1998

Kissaviarsuk-33	3–1	B-67 Nuuk

Qaqortoq Stadium, Qaqortoq

=== Pool 2 ===
Pos	Team	Pld	W	D	L	GF	GA	GD	Pts	Qualification or relegation
1	Narsaq-85	3	2	1	0	11	4	+7	7	1998 Greenlandic Men's Football Championship Semi-finals
2	Kugsak-45	3	2	0	1	9	3	+6	6	1998 Greenlandic Men's Football Championship Semi-finals
3	Nagdlunguaq-48	3	1	1	1	10	4	+6	4	1998 Greenlandic Men's Football Championship Fifth Place Match
4	Umanak BK 68	3	0	0	3	0	19	−19	0	1998 Greenlandic Men's Football Championship Seventh Place Match

20 August 1998

Narsaq-85	2–2	Nagdlunguaq-48

Qaqortoq Stadium, Qaqortoq
20 August 1998

Kugsak-45	5–0	Umanak BK 68

Qaqortoq Stadium, Qaqortoq

21 August 1998

Narsaq-85	6–0	Umanak BK 68

Qaqortoq Stadium, Qaqortoq
21 August 1998

Kugsak-45	2–0	Nagdlunguaq-48

Qaqortoq Stadium, Qaqortoq

22 August 1998

Narsaq-85	3–2	Kugsak-45

Qaqortoq Stadium, Qaqortoq
22 August 1998

Nagdlunguaq-48	8–0	Umanak BK 68

Qaqortoq Stadium, Qaqortoq

== Playoffs ==
=== Semi-finals ===
23 August 1998

Kissaviarsuk-33	4–3	Kugsak-45

Qaqortoq Stadium, Qaqortoq
23 August 1998

Narsaq-85	1–2	Nuuk IL

Qaqortoq Stadium, Qaqortoq

=== Seventh-place match ===
24 August 1998

A.T.A.-60	2–5	Umanak BK 68

Qaqortoq Stadium, Qaqortoq

=== Fifth-place match ===
24 August 1998

B-67 Nuuk	4–1	Nagdlunguaq-48

Qaqortoq Stadium, Qaqortoq

=== Third-place match ===
25 August 1998

Narsaq-85	5–3 (a.e.t.)	Kugsak-45

Qaqortoq Stadium, Qaqortoq

=== Final ===
25 August 1998

Kissaviarsuk-33	1–0	Nuuk IL

Qaqortoq Stadium, Qaqortoq

== See also ==
- Football in Greenland
- Football Association of Greenland
- Greenland national football team
- Greenlandic Men's Football Championship
