= 1985 Greenlandic Men's Football Championship =

- Season: 1985
- Champions: Nuuk IL (3rd title)

The 1985 Greenlandic Men's Football Championship was the 15th edition of the Greenlandic Men's Football Championship. The final round was held in Nuuk. It was won by Nuuk IL for the third time in its history.

== Playoffs ==
=== Seventh-place match ===
Umanak BK 68	2–1	Kugsak-45

Nuuk Stadium, Nuuk

=== Fifth-place match ===
Nagtoralik Paamiut	4–1	Aqigssiaq Maniitsoq

Nuuk Stadium, Nuuk

=== Third-place match ===
Kissaviarsuk-33	3–1	Nagdlunguaq-48

Nuuk Stadium, Nuuk

=== Final ===
Nuuk IL	4–2	Disko-76

Nuuk Stadium, Nuuk

== Final standings ==
Position	Team
1st	Nuuk IL
2nd	Disko-76
3rd	Kissaviarsuk-33
4th	Nagdlunguaq-48
5th	Nagtoralik Paamiut
6th	Aqigssiaq Maniitsoq
7th	Umanak BK 68
8th	Kugsak-45

== See also ==
- Football in Greenland
- Football Association of Greenland
- Greenland national football team
- Greenlandic Men's Football Championship
