= 1978 Greenlandic Men's Football Championship =

- Season: 1978
- Champions: Nagdlunguaq-48 (2nd title)

The 1978 Greenlandic Men's Football Championship was the eighth edition of the Greenlandic Men's Football Championship. The final round was held in Nuuk. It was won by Nagdlunguaq-48 for the second time in its history.

== Final round ==
Pos	Team	Pld	W	D	L	GF	GA	GD	Pts
1	Nagdlunguaq-48 (C)	3	2	1	0	8	3	+5	5
2	Nuuk IL	3	1	1	1	5	5	0	3
3	Kissaviarsuk-33	3	0	2	1	3	5	−2	2
4	CIF-70 Qasigiannguit	3	1	0	2	4	7	−3	2

(C) Champions

Nuuk IL	1–1	Kissaviarsuk-33

Nuuk Stadium, Nuuk

CIF-70 Qasigiannguit	1–3	Nagdlunguaq-48

Nuuk Stadium, Nuuk

Nuuk IL	1–4	Nagdlunguaq-48

Nuuk Stadium, Nuuk

Kissaviarsuk-33	1–3	CIF-70 Qasigiannguit

Nuuk Stadium, Nuuk

Kissaviarsuk-33	1–1	Nagdlunguaq-48

Nuuk Stadium, Nuuk

Nuuk IL	3–0	CIF-70 Qasigiannguit

Nuuk Stadium, Nuuk

== See also ==
- Football in Greenland
- Football Association of Greenland
- Greenland national football team
- Greenlandic Men's Football Championship
