= 1987 Greenlandic Men's Football Championship =

- Season: 1987
- Champions: Kissaviarsuk-33 (4th title)

The 1987 Greenlandic Men's Football Championship was the 17th edition of the Greenlandic Men's Football Championship. The final round was held in Maniitsoq between August 22 and 28. It was won by Kissaviarsuk-33 for the fourth time in its history.

== Final stage ==
=== Group A ===
Position	Team
1st	Nagdlunguaq-48
2nd	Kissaviarsuk-33
3rd	Nuuk IL
4th	Sisimiut-68

=== Group B ===
Position	Team
1st	Disko-76
2nd	Nagtoralik Paamiut
3rd	Aqigssiaq Maniitsoq
4th	FC Malamuk

== Playoffs ==
=== Semi-finals ===
Nagdlunguaq-48	def.	Nagtoralik Paamiut

Maniitsoq Stadium, Maniitsoq

Disko-76	def. by	Kissaviarsuk-33

Maniitsoq Stadium, Maniitsoq

=== Third-place match ===
28 August 1987

Nagtoralik Paamiut	8–2	Disko-76

Maniitsoq Stadium, Maniitsoq

=== Final ===
28 August 1987

Kissaviarsuk-33	2–2 (a.e.t.)	Nagdlunguaq-48
Penalties
	4–2

Maniitsoq Stadium, Maniitsoq

== See also ==
- Football in Greenland
- Football Association of Greenland
- Greenland national football team
- Greenlandic Men's Football Championship
