= 1976 Greenlandic Men's Football Championship =

- Season: 1976
- Champions: Grønlands Seminarius Sportklub (5th title)

The 1976 Greenlandic Men's Football Championship was the sixth edition of the Greenlandic Men's Football Championship. The final round was held in Nuuk. It was won by Grønlands Seminarius Sportklub for the fifth title in its history.

== Final round ==
Pos	Team	Pld	W	D	L	GF	GA	GD	Pts
1	Grønlands Seminarius Sportklub (C)	3	2	1	0	8	2	+6	5
2	Nagtoralik Paamiut	3	2	0	1	9	8	+1	4
3	Ilulissat-69	3	0	2	1	6	8	−2	2
4	Nuuk IL	3	0	1	2	5	10	−5	1

(C) Champions

Nagtoralik Paamiut	5–3	Ilulissat-69

Nuuk Stadium, Nuuk

Grønlands Seminarius Sportklub	4–1	Nuuk IL

Nuuk Stadium, Nuuk

Nuuk IL	3–3	Ilulissat-69

Nuuk Stadium, Nuuk

Nagtoralik Paamiut	1–4	Grønlands Seminarius Sportklub

Nuuk Stadium, Nuuk

Grønlands Seminarius Sportklub	0–0	Ilulissat-69

Nuuk Stadium, Nuuk

Nagtoralik Paamiut	3–1	Nuuk IL

Nuuk Stadium, Nuuk

== See also ==
- Football in Greenland
- Football Association of Greenland
- Greenland national football team
- Greenlandic Men's Football Championship
