= 1973 Greenlandic Football Championship =

Greenlandic Football Championship
- Season: 1973
- Champions: Grønlands Seminarius Sportklub (3rd title)

The 1973 Greenlandic Football Championship was the third edition of the Greenlandic Football Championship. With the final round being held in Nuuk. Which was won by Grønlands Seminarius Sportklub, the third national title in its history.

== Final round ==
Pos	Team	Pld	W	D	L	GF	GA	GD	Pts
1	Grønlands Seminarius Sportklub (C)	3	3	0	0	19	2	+17	6
2	Siumut Amerdlok Kunuk	0	0	0	0	0	0	0	0
3	Ilulissat-69	0	0	0	0	0	0	0	0
4	Nuuk IL	0	0	0	0	0	0	0	0

(C) Champions

== See also ==
- Football in Greenland
- Football Association of Greenland
- Greenland national football team
- Greenlandic Football Championship
