= 2026 Greenlandic Football Championship =

2026 Angutit Inersimasut Isikkamik arsarluni NP
- Season: 2026
- Dates: 3 August – 8 August 2026
- Champions: B-67 Nuuk (17th title)

The 2026 Angutit Inersimasut Isikkamik arsarluni NP is the 56th edition of the Greenlandic Football Championship. The final round was held in Maniitsoq from 3 to 8 August. It was won by B-67 Nuuk for the seventeenth time in its history.

== Qualifying stage ==
Not held because of financial reasons no qualifying stage was held, so only registered teams that have renewed their annual GM license with KAK can participate in the final phase of the championship.

== Qualified teams ==
Location of teams of the 2026 Greenlandic Football Championship.

Team	City
Aqigssiaq Maniitsoq	Maniitsoq
B-67 Nuuk	Nuuk
~~FC Nuuk~~ (Note: FC Nuuk, FC Tugto, Kissaviarsuk-33 and Siuteroq Nanortalik-43 withdrew due to a lack of players.)	Nuuk
~~FC Tugto~~	Nuuk
G-44 Qeqertarsuaq	Qeqertarsuaq
Inuit Timersoqatigiiffiat-79	Nuuk
~~Kissaviarsuk-33~~	Qaqortoq
~~Siuteroq Nanortalik-43~~	Nanortalik

== Final round ==
=== Group stage ===
Pos	Team	Pld	W	D	L	GF	GA	GD	Pts	Qualification	G44	B67	AQM	IT79
1	G-44 Qeqertarsuaq	3	2	1	0	7	3	+4	7	Advanced to semi-finals		1–1	3–1	3–1
2	B-67 Nuuk	3	2	1	0	6	3	+3	7	Advanced to semi-finals			3–2	2–0
3	Aqigssiaq Maniitsoq (H)	3	1	0	2	5	7	−2	3	Advanced to semi-finals		2–3		
4	Inuit Timersoqatigiiffiat-79	3	0	0	3	2	7	−5	0	Advanced to semi-finals			1–2	

(H) Hosts

== Playoffs ==
=== Semi-finals ===
Semi-finals
7 August — Maniitsoq
G-44 Qeqertarsuaq (p)	2 (4)
Inuit Timersoqatigiiffiat-79	2 (1)
7 August — Maniitsoq
Aqigssiaq Maniitsoq	1
B-67 Nuuk (a.e.t.)	3

Final
8 August — Maniitsoq
G-44 Qeqertarsuaq	0
B-67 Nuuk	4
Third place play-off
8 August — Maniitsoq
Inuit Timersoqatigiiffiat-79	0
Aqigssiaq Maniitsoq	5

==== Semi-finals ====
7 August 2026

G-44 Qeqertarsuaq	2–2 (a.e.t.)	Inuit Timersoqatigiiffiat-79
Krogh 44'; Lund 90+1'		Tittussen 68'; Thomsen 90+5'
Penalties
	4–1

Maniitsoq Stadium, Maniitsoq
7 August 2026

Aqigssiaq Maniitsoq	1–3 (a.e.t.)	B-67 Nuuk
Wind 49'		Eriksen Petersen 38', 110', 120+2'

Maniitsoq Stadium, Maniitsoq

==== Third-place match ====
8 August 2026

Inuit Timersoqatigiiffiat-79	0–5	Aqigssiaq Maniitsoq
		Petersen 45'; Kreutzmann 48'; Ole Kleist 60'; Dahl 85', 90+2'

Maniitsoq Stadium, Maniitsoq

==== Final ====
8 August 2026

G-44 Qeqertarsuaq	0–4	B-67 Nuuk
		Hermann 46', 59'; Eriksen Petersen 68'; Rosing 73'

Maniitsoq Stadium, Maniitsoq

== Announcement of changes to the competition ==
Since, over the years, there have been more and more cancellations of teams registered just a few days before the start of the tournaments, KAK announced in a statement that this will be the last time the championship uses this format and that, starting next year, the tournament structure will change in an effort to give also more teams from villages the chance to participate in the final stage.

== See also ==
- Football in Greenland
- Football Association of Greenland
- Greenland national football team
- Greenlandic Football Championship
