= 1979 Greenlandic Men's Football Championship =

9th edition of the Greenlandic Men's Football Championship

- Season: 1979
- Champions: CIF-70 Qasigiannguit (1st title)

The 1979 Greenlandic Men's Football Championship was the ninth edition of the Greenlandic Men's Football Championship. The final round was held in Aasiaat. It was won after extra time by CIF-70 Qasigiannguit who defeated Siumut Amerdlok Kunuk 2–1 in the final.

== See also ==
- Football in Greenland
- Football Association of Greenland
- Greenland national football team
- Greenlandic Men's Football Championship
