= 1971 Greenlandic Football Championship =

Greenlandic Football Championship
- Season: 1971
- Champions: Tupilak-41 (3rd title)

The 1971 Greenlandic Football Championship was the inaugural edition of the Greenlandic Football Championship. The final round was held in Nuuk. It was won by Tupilak-41 who defeated Grønlands Seminarius Sportklub 1–0 in the final.

== Final standings ==
Position	Team
1st	Tupilak-41
2nd	Grønlands Seminarius Sportklub
3rd	Umanak BK 68

== See also ==
- Football in Greenland
- Football Association of Greenland
- Greenland national football team
- Greenlandic Football Championship
