= 1975 Greenlandic Men's Football Championship =

- Season: 1975
- Champions: Grønlands Seminarius Sportklub (4th title)

The 1975 Greenlandic Men's Football Championship was the fifth edition of the Greenlandic Men's Football Championship. The final round was held in Aasiaat. It was won by Grønlands Seminarius Sportklub who defeated G-44 Qeqertarsuaq 2–0 in the final.

== Final standings ==
Position	Team
1st	Grønlands Seminarius Sportklub
2nd	G-44 Qeqertarsuaq
3rd	Ilulissat-69

== See also ==
- Football in Greenland
- Football Association of Greenland
- Greenland national football team
- Greenlandic Men's Football Championship
