= 1986 Greenlandic Men's Football Championship =

- Season: 1986
- Champions: Nuuk IL (4th title)

The 1986 Greenlandic Men's Football Championship was the 16th edition of the Greenlandic Men's Football Championship. The final round was held in Nuuk. It was won by Nuuk IL for the fourth time in its history.

== Playoffs ==
=== Third-place match ===
Kagssagssuk Maniitsoq	def.	Umanak BK 68

Nuuk Stadium, Nuuk

=== Final ===
Nuuk IL	def.	Kissaviarsuk-33 B

Nuuk Stadium, Nuuk

== Final standings ==
Position	Team
1st	Nuuk IL
2nd	Kissaviarsuk-33 B
3rd	Kagssagssuk Maniitsoq
4th	Umanak BK 68
5th	Kissaviarsuk-33
6th	Disko-76

== See also ==
- Football in Greenland
- Football Association of Greenland
- Greenland national football team
- Greenlandic Men's Football Championship
