= 1970 Greenlandic Football Championship =

Greenlandic Football Championship
- Season: 1970
- Champions: Tupilak-41 (2nd title)

The 1970 Greenlandic Football Championship (also known as the Danish: Fodboldturneringen Grønlandturneringen, Fodboldmesterskab i Grønland or Greenlandic: Angutit Inersimasut GM) was the eighth edition of the Greenlandic Men's Football Championship and the final edition organised by Grønlands Idrætsforening before a dedicated Football Association of Greenland was established the following year. The final round was held in Sisimiut. It was won by Tupilak-41 who defeated Kissaviarsuk-33 5–3 in the final.

== Background ==
The first federation to organise a national football championship in Greenland was the GIF (Danish: Grønlands Idrætsforening), a general sports federation that organised more than just football tournaments, founded on 3 September 1953 at a meeting attended by eleven clubs from Upernavik, Uummannaq, Qeqertarsuatsiaat, Qasigiannguit, Aasiaat, Sisimiut, Maniitsoq, Nuuk, Paamiut and Qaqortoq. The 1954–55 tournament was the first national football tournament and GIF continued to organise the competition, usually announced as Fodboldturneringen, Grønlandturneringen or Fodboldmesterskab i Grønland, until 1970. For the first decade of its existence, the tournament was held sporadically, with iterations often taking more than a year to complete. In 1971 a football specific federation, the Football Association of Greenland (Greenlandic: Kalaallit Nunaanni Isikkamik Arsaattartut Kattuffiat; Danish: Grønlands Boldspil-Union), was founded, and took over the organisation of the tournament.

== Results ==
No results are available for the season, although it is known that the championship was won by Tupilak-41 who defeated Kissaviarsuk-33 5–3 in the final held in Sisimiut, their second title and the fourth time in a row that the team had finished either first or second.

1970 Greenlandic Football Championship

Tupilak-41
Second Title
