= 1972 Greenlandic Football Championship =

Greenlandic Football Championship
- Season: 1972
- Champions: Grønlands Seminarius Sportklub (2nd title)

The 1972 Greenlandic Football Championship was the second edition of the Greenlandic Football Championship. The final round was held in Nuuk. It was the first football championship won by Grønlands Seminarius Sportklub and the second national title in its history.

== Final round ==
Pos	Team	Pld	W	D	L	GF	GA	GD	Pts
1	Grønlands Seminarius Sportklub (C)	3	3	0	0	19	2	+17	6
2	G-44 Qeqertarsuaq	3	1	1	1	7	13	−6	3
3	Tupilak-41	3	1	0	2	7	8	−1	2
4	Kissaviarsuk-33	3	0	1	2	7	17	−10	1

(C) Champions

== See also ==
- Football in Greenland
- Football Association of Greenland
- Greenland national football team
- Greenlandic Football Championship
