= 1984 Greenlandic Men's Football Championship =

- Season: 1984
- Champions: Nagdlunguaq-48 (6th title)

The 1984 Greenlandic Men's Football Championship was the 14th edition of the Greenlandic Men's Football Championship. The final round was held in Ilulissat. It was won by Nagdlunguaq-48 for the sixth time in its history.

== Final round ==
=== Pool 1 ===
Pos	Team	Pld	W	D	L	GF	GA	GD	Pts	Qualification or relegation
1	Nuuk IL	2	2	0	0	11	1	+10	4	1984 Greenlandic Men's Football Championship Semi-finals
2	Nagtoralik Paamiut	2	1	0	1	3	6	−3	2	1984 Greenlandic Men's Football Championship Semi-finals
3	Umanak BK 68	2	0	0	2	1	8	−7	0	

6 September 1984

Nuuk IL	6–0	Umanak BK 68

Ilulissat Stadium, Ilulissat

7 September 1984

Umanak BK 68	1–2	Nagtoralik Paamiut

Ilulissat Stadium, Ilulissat

8 September 1984

Nuuk IL	5–1	Nagtoralik Paamiut

Ilulissat Stadium, Ilulissat

=== Pool 2 ===
Pos	Team	Pld	W	D	L	GF	GA	GD	Pts	Qualification or relegation
1	Nagdlunguaq-48	2	2	0	0	4	1	+3	4	1984 Greenlandic Men's Football Championship Semi-finals
2	Disko-76	2	1	0	1	2	3	−1	2	1984 Greenlandic Men's Football Championship Semi-finals
3	Kagssagssuk Maniitsoq	2	0	0	2	2	4	−2	0	

6 September 1984

Nagdlunguaq-48	2–1	Kagssagssuk Maniitsoq

Ilulissat Stadium, Ilulissat

7 September 1984

Disko-76	2–1	Kagssagssuk Maniitsoq

Ilulissat Stadium, Ilulissat

8 September 1984

Disko-76	0–2	Nagdlunguaq-48

Ilulissat Stadium, Ilulissat

== Playoffs ==
=== Semi-finals ===
10 September 1984

Nuuk IL	2–2 (a.e.t.)	Disko-76
Penalties
	3–5

Ilulissat Stadium, Ilulissat
10 September 1984

Nagdlunguaq-48	8–1	Nagtoralik Paamiut

Ilulissat Stadium, Ilulissat

=== Third place match ===
12 September 1984

Nuuk IL	3–1	Nagtoralik Paamiut

Ilulissat Stadium, Ilulissat

=== Final ===
13 September 1984

Nagdlunguaq-48	3–0	Disko-76

Ilulissat Stadium, Ilulissat

== See also ==
- Football in Greenland
- Football Association of Greenland
- Greenland national football team
- Greenlandic Men's Football Championship
