= 2023 Greenlandic Football Championship =

2023 Angutit inersimasut GM
- Season: 2023
- Dates: 10 August 2023 – 15 August 2023
- Champions: B-67 Nuuk (14th title)
- Matches played: 18
- Goals scored: 123 (6.83 per match)
- Top goalscorer: Nicolai Nielsen (9 goals)

The 2023 GrønlandsBANKEN GM was the 53rd edition of the Greenlandic Football Championship. The final round was held in Qaqortoq from 10 to 15 August. It was won by Boldklubben af 1967 for the fourteenth time in its history.

== Teams ==
Location of teams of the 2023 Greenlandic Football Championship.

For the season, there was no qualifying tournament for the final tournament, with all teams being selected for this season's participation. The tournament was hosted in the city of Qaqortoq, home of Kissaviarsuk-33 which was celebrating the 90th anniversary of its founding, this being the oldest club in Greenland.

Team	City
B-67 Nuuk	Nuuk
Eqaluk-54	Qasigiannguit
G-44 Qeqertarsuaq	Qeqertarsuaq
Inuit Timersoqatigiiffiat-79	Nuuk
Kissaviarsuk-33	Qaqortoq
Nagtoralik-45	Paamiut

== Final Round ==
Pos	Team	Pld	W	D	L	GF	GA	GD	Pts	
1	G-44 Qeqertarsuaq	5	4	1	0	18	7	+11	13	Advanced to final
2	B-67 Nuuk (C)	5	4	0	1	35	4	+31	12	Advanced to final
3	Inuit Timersoqatigiiffiat-79	5	3	0	2	30	17	+13	9	Advanced to third place match
4	Kissaviarsuk-33 (H)	5	2	1	2	15	19	−4	7	Advanced to third place match
5	Nagtoralik-45	5	1	0	4	8	16	−8	3	Advanced to fifth place match
6	Eqaluk-54	5	0	0	5	4	47	−43	0	Advanced to fifth place match

(C) Champions; (H) Hosts

=== Results table ===
Home \ Away	B67	E54	G44	IT79	K33	N45
B-67 Nuuk		15–0	2–3		7–0	
Eqaluk-54						
G-44 Qeqertarsuaq		6–0			1–1	
Inuit Timersoqatigiiffiat-79	1–6	14–1	4–5		8–4	3–1
Kissaviarsuk-33		7–1				
Nagtoralik-45	0–5	5–2	0–3		2–3	

Updated to match(es) played on unknown. Source:
Legend: Blue = home team win; Yellow = draw; Red = away team win.

== Results ==
10 August 2023

Inuit Timersoqatigiiffiat-79	3–1	Nagtoralik-45

Qaqortoq Stadium, Qaqortoq
10 August 2023

B-67 Nuuk	2–3	G-44 Qeqertarsuaq

Qaqortoq Stadium, Qaqortoq
10 August 2023

Kissaviarsuk-33	7–1	Eqaluk-54

Qaqortoq Stadium, Qaqortoq

11 August 2023

Inuit Timersoqatigiiffiat-79	1–6	B-67 Nuuk

Qaqortoq Stadium, Qaqortoq
11 August 2023

Nagtoralik-45	2–3	Kissaviarsuk-33

Qaqortoq Stadium, Qaqortoq
11 August 2023

G-44 Qeqertarsuaq	6–0	Eqaluk-54

Qaqortoq Stadium, Qaqortoq

12 August 2023

Inuit Timersoqatigiiffiat-79	4–5	G-44 Qeqertarsuaq

Qaqortoq Stadium, Qaqortoq
12 August 2023

Nagtoralik-45	5–2	Eqaluk-54

Qaqortoq Stadium, Qaqortoq
12 August 2023

B-67 Nuuk	7–0	Kissaviarsuk-33

Qaqortoq Stadium, Qaqortoq

13 August 2023

Inuit Timersoqatigiiffiat-79	8–4	Kissaviarsuk-33

Qaqortoq Stadium, Qaqortoq
13 August 2023

Nagtoralik-45	0–3	G-44 Qeqertarsuaq

Qaqortoq Stadium, Qaqortoq
13 August 2023

B-67 Nuuk	15–0	Eqaluk-54

Qaqortoq Stadium, Qaqortoq

14 August 2023

Inuit Timersoqatigiiffiat-79	14–1	Eqaluk-54

Qaqortoq Stadium, Qaqortoq
14 August 2023

Nagtoralik-45	0–5	B-67 Nuuk

Qaqortoq Stadium, Qaqortoq
14 August 2023

G-44 Qeqertarsuaq	1–1	Kissaviarsuk-33

Qaqortoq Stadium, Qaqortoq

== Playoffs ==
Fifth place
14 July – Qaqortoq
Nagtoralik-45	3
Eqaluk-54	2

Third place
15 August – Qaqortoq
Inuit Timersoqatigiiffiat-79	1
Kissaviarsuk-33	2

Final
15 August – Qaqortoq
G-44 Qeqertarsuaq	0
B-67 Nuuk	5

=== Fifth place match ===
15 August 2023

Nagtoralik-45	3–2	Eqaluk-54

Qaqortoq Stadium, Qaqortoq

=== Third place match ===
15 August 2023

Inuit Timersoqatigiiffiat-79	1–2	Kissaviarsuk-33

Qaqortoq Stadium, Qaqortoq

=== Final ===
15 August 2023

G-44 Qeqertarsuaq	0–5	B-67 Nuuk

Qaqortoq Stadium, Qaqortoq

== See also ==
- Football in Greenland
- Football Association of Greenland
- Greenland national football team
- Greenlandic Men's Football Championship
