= 1983 Greenlandic Men's Football Championship =

- Season: 1983
- Champions: Nagdlunguaq-48 (5th title)

The 1983 Greenlandic Men's Football Championship was the 13th edition of the Greenlandic Men's Football Championship. The final round was held in Paamiut. It was won by Nagdlunguaq-48 who defeated CIF-70 Qasigiannguit in the final.

== See also ==
- Football in Greenland
- Football Association of Greenland
- Greenland national football team
- Greenlandic Men's Football Championship
