= 1974 Greenlandic Men's Football Championship =

- Season: 1974
- Champions: Siumut Amerdlok Kunuk (1st title)

The 1974 Greenlandic Men's Football Championship was the fourth edition of the Greenlandic Men's Football Championship. The final round was held in Sisimiut. It was won by Siumut Amerdlok Kunuk.

== See also ==
- Football in Greenland
- Football Association of Greenland
- Greenland national football team
- Greenlandic Men's Football Championship
