= FC Nuuk =

Greenlandic football club

- Full name: Football Club Nuuk
- Founded: 2021
- Ground: Nuuk Stadium
- Capacity: 2,000
- League: Greenlandic Football Championship
- 2025: Greenlandic Football Championship, 8th of 8
- Website: https://www.facebook.com/FC-Nuuk-103579655775135

FC Nuuk is a Greenlandic football club based in the capital of Nuuk. Founded in 2021, the team plays in the Greenlandic Football Championship.

== History ==
FC Nuuk entered the Greenlandic Football Championship for the first time in 2021, but the season was eventually abandoned because of the COVID-19 pandemic after FC Nuuk played only a single match. The following season the full schedule was played, but the club did not make it out of the qualifying group stage against the other clubs from Nuuk.

== Domestic history ==
Key

Champion Runners-up 3rd Place

Season	Qualifying									Finals							Notes
Season	Div.	Pos.	Pl.	W	D	L	GF	GA	Pts.	Pos.	Pl.	W	D	L	GF	GA	Notes
2021	1st	5th	1	0	0	1	2	5	0	Abandoned because of COVID-19 pandemic							
2022	1st	4th	4	1	0	3	6	13	3	Did not qualify							
2023	1st	Did not enter															
2024	1st	Did not enter															
2025	1st	4th	4	0	1	3	4	16	1	8th	5	1	0	4	6	20	
2026	1st	Withdrew															
