= 1977 Greenlandic Men's Football Championship =

- Season: 1977
- Champions: Nagdlunguaq-48 (1st title)

The 1977 Greenlandic Men's Football Championship was the seventh edition of the Greenlandic Men's Football Championship. The final round was held in Sisimiut. It was won by Nagdlunguaq-48.

== See also ==
- Football in Greenland
- Football Association of Greenland
- Greenland national football team
- Greenlandic Men's Football Championship
