= Greenland Women's Volleyball League =

- Current season, competition or edition: 2022–23
- Sport: Volleyball
- Founded: 1984
- First season: 1984
- No. of teams: 5 Teams
- Country: Greenland
- Continent: Europe
- Domestic cups: Greenland Cup; Greenland Super Cup
- International cups: CEV Champions League; CEV Cup; CEV Challenge Cup

The Greenland Women's Volleyball Championship is an annual competition for Greenlandic women's volleyball teams. It has been held since the year of 1984 Under the rule and management of the Greenland Volleyball Federation (Kalaallit Nunaanni Volleyballertartut Kattuffiat, KVK or Grønlands Volleyball Forbund, GVF in Danish ).

== Competition formula ==
The championship is held in one city over several days. The tournament consists of two stages - preliminary and final. In 2021 in the preliminary stage the teams played in one round. According to results, the two best teams advanced to the finals and played for the championship. Bronze medals were contested by teams that took 3-4 places in the preliminary stage. The championship of 2021 went to 5 teams: AVI (Manitsok), I-69 (Ilulissat), KT-VI (Kangaamyut), PVN (Nuuk), KIF-70 (Kasigiannguit). I-69 won the championship title by defeating AVI 3–1 in the final. Third place went to KT-VI.

== List of winners ==
| Years | Champions | Runners-up | Third place |
|---|---|---|---|
| 1984 | AVI Maniitsoq | Grønlands Seminarius Sportklub (GSS) | |
| 1985 | Grønlands Seminarius Sportklub 1 (GSS 1) | Grønlands Seminarius Sportklub 2 (GSS 2) | |
| 1986 | Grønlands Seminarius Sportklub (GSS) | AVI Maniitsoq | Christianshåb Idrætsforening 70 (CIF-70) |
| 1987 | AVI Maniitsoq | Grønlands Seminarius Sportklub (GSS) | Christianshåb Idrætsforening 70 (CIF-70) |
| 1988 | Grønlands Seminarius Sportklub (GSS) | AVI Maniitsoq | Christianshåb Idrætsforening 70 (CIF-70) |
| 1989 | Grønlands Seminarius Sportklub (GSS) | AVI Maniitsoq | Christianshåb Idrætsforening 70 (CIF-70) |
| 1990 | AVI Maniitsoq | Grønlands Seminarius Sportklub (GSS) | Christianshåb Idrætsforening 70 (CIF-70) |
| 1991 | AVI Maniitsoq | Grønlands Seminarius Sportklub (GSS) | Christianshåb Idrætsforening 70 (CIF-70) |
| 1992 | AVI Maniitsoq | Grønlands Seminarius Sportklub (GSS) | Christianshåb Idrætsforening 70 (CIF-70) |
| 1993 | Grønlands Seminarius Sportklub (GSS) | Christianshåb Idrætsforening 70 (CIF-70) | AVI Maniitsoq |
| 1994 | AVI Maniitsoq | Grønlands Seminarius Sportklub (GSS) | Christianshåb Idrætsforening 70 (CIF-70) |
| 1995 | AVI Maniitsoq | Grønlands Seminarius Sportklub (GSS) | Christianshåb Idrætsforening 70 (CIF-70) |
| 1996 | Grønlands Seminarius Sportklub (GSS) | AVI Maniitsoq | Qaqortoq VP (QVP) |
| 1997 | Grønlands Seminarius Sportklub (GSS) | Christianshåb Idrætsforening 70 (CIF-70) | AVI Maniitsoq |
| 1998 | Grønlands Seminarius Sportklub (GSS) | AVI Maniitsoq | IP-85 |
| 1999 | AVI Maniitsoq | Grønlands Seminarius Sportklub (GSS) | Qaqortoq VP (QVP) |
| 2000 | Grønlands Seminarius Sportklub (GSS) | AVI Maniitsoq | IP-85 |
| 2001 | AVI Maniitsoq | Grønlands Seminarius Sportklub (GSS) | IP-85 |
| 2002 | AVI Maniitsoq | Grønlands Seminarius Sportklub (GSS) | IP-85 |
| 2003 | Grønlands Seminarius Sportklub (GSS) | AVI Maniitsoq | Ilulissat VK (IVK) |
| 2004 | AVI Maniitsoq | Grønlands Seminarius Sportklub (GSS) | Ilulissat VK (IVK) |
| 2005 | Grønlands Seminarius Sportklub (GSS) | AVI Maniitsoq | Qaqortoq VP (QVP) |
| 2006 | AVI Maniitsoq | Grønlands Seminarius Sportklub (GSS) | Ilulissat VK (IVK) |
| 2007 | Grønlands Seminarius Sportklub (GSS) | Qaqortoq VP (QVP) | AVI Maniitsoq |
| 2008 | Grønlands Seminarius Sportklub (GSS) | AVI Maniitsoq | KT-VI Kangaamiut |
| 2009 | Grønlands Seminarius Sportklub 1 (GSS 1) | Grønlands Seminarius Sportklub 2 (GSS 2) | AVI Maniitsoq |
| 2010 | Grønlands Seminarius Sportklub (GSS) | AVI Maniitsoq | Polar volley Nuuk (PVN) |
| 2011 | Polar volley Nuuk (PVN) | Grønlands Seminarius Sportklub (GSS) | KT-VI Kangaamiut |
| 2012 | AVI Maniitsoq | Polar volley Nuuk (PVN) | Grønlands Seminarius Sportklub (GSS) |
| 2013 | AVI Maniitsoq | Polar volley Nuuk (PVN) | Grønlands Seminarius Sportklub (GSS) |
| 2014 | Polar volley Nuuk (PVN) | Grønlands Seminarius Sportklub (GSS) | AVS Sisimiut |
| 2015 | Grønlands Seminarius Sportklub (GSS) | Polar volley Nuuk (PVN) | AVS Sisimiut |
| 2016 | Grønlands Seminarius Sportklub (GSS) | AVS Sisimiut | Ilulissat VK (IVK) |
| 2017 | Grønlands Seminarius Sportklub (GSS) | Polar volley Nuuk (PVN) | AVI Maniitsoq |
| 2018 | AVI Maniitsoq | KT-VI Kangaamiut | Polar volley Nuuk (PVN) |
| 2019 | KT-VI Kangaamiut | AVI Maniitsoq | |
| 2020 | Cancelled Due COVID-19 Pandemic | | |
| 2021 | Ilulissat VK (IVK) | AVI Maniitsoq | KT-VI Kangaamiut |

== Titles by club ==
| Rk | Club | Titles | City | Years won |
|---|---|---|---|---|
| 1 | GSS Nuuk | 18 | Nuuk | (1985–1986), (1988–1989), 1993, (1996–1998), 2000, 2003, 2005, (2007–2010), (2015–2017) |
| 2 | AVI Maniitsoq | 15 | Maniitsoq | 1984, 1987, (1990–1992), (1994,–1995), 1999, (2001–2002), 2004, 2006, (2012–2013), 2018 |
| 3 | Polar volley Nuuk | 2 | Nuuk | 2011, 2014 |
