= UB-83 Upernavik =

Greenlandic football club

- Full name: Upernavik Boldklub-83
- Founded: 1983
- Ground: Upernavik Field
- League: Greenlandic Football Championship
- 2022: 6th
- Website: https://www.facebook.com/groups/451623911664121/about/

UB-83 Upernavik is a Greenlandic football club based in Upernavik, Founded in 1983, the team plays in the Greenlandic Football Championship.

== Stadium ==
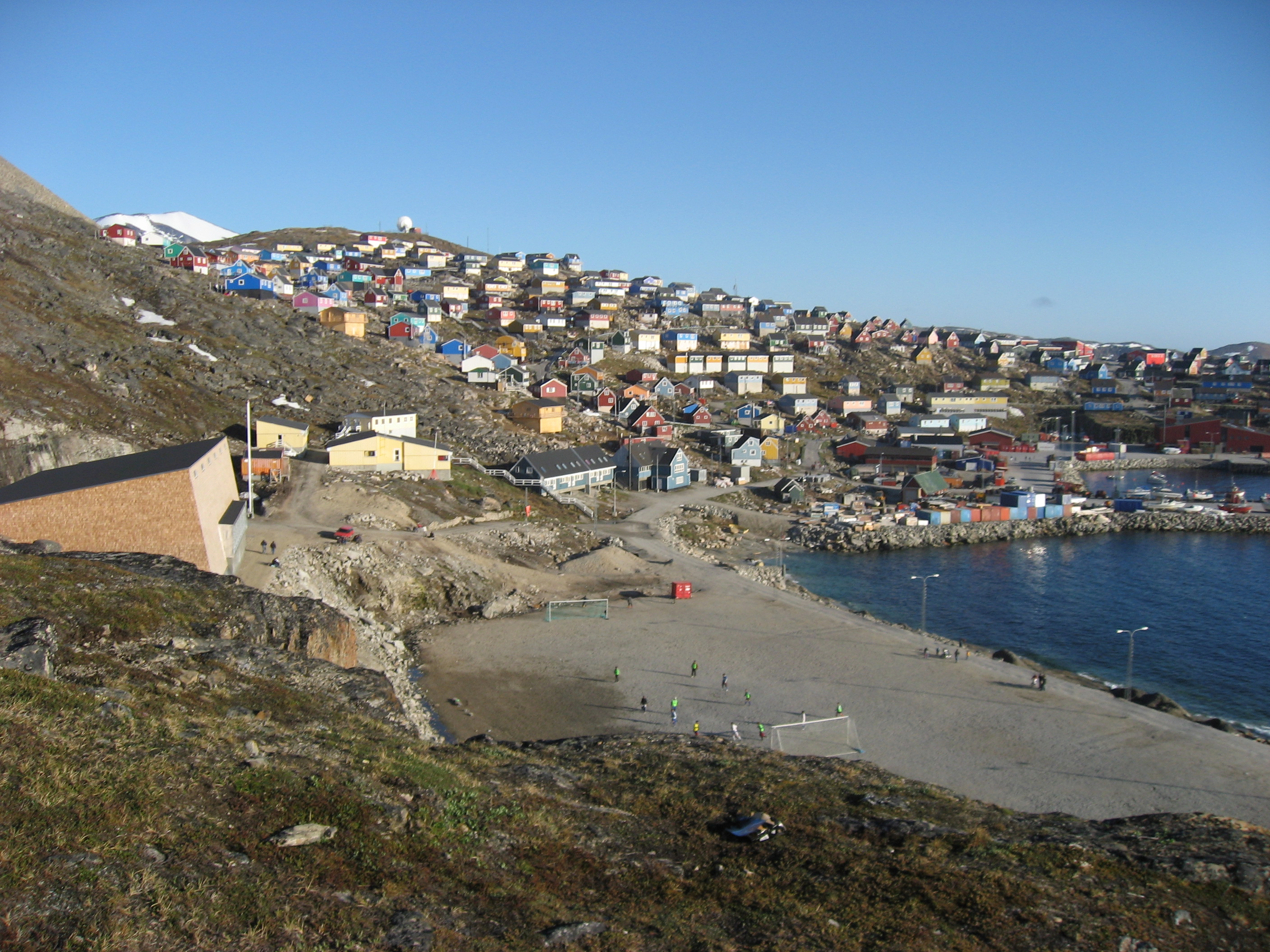
Upernavik Field in 2007 before the installation of artificial turf

The club plays at the Upernavik Field. The stadium's modernization was financed by the Football Association of Greenland.
