= Nagtoralik-45 =

Sports club in Paamiut, Greenland

- Full name: Timersoqatigiiffik Nagtoralik 1945
- Founded: 1945
- Ground: Paamiutbane
- Capacity: 450
- League: Coca-Cola GM

Nagtoralik-45 (also known as N-45) is a Greenlandic sports club based in Paamiut, Sermersooq, Greenland. The club was founded in 1945 and competes in sports such as football, futsal, handball, and badminton. Their football team competes annually in qualifying for the Coca-Cola GM, Greenland's men's football championship.
