= CIF-70 Qasigiannguit =

Greenlandic sports club

- Full name: CIF-70 Qasigiannguit
- Founded: 1970
- Ground: Qasigiannguit Stadium; Qasigiannguit, Greenland
- League: Coca Cola GM
Home colours	Away colours

Christianshåb-70 is a sports club from Greenland based in Qasigiannguit. They compete in the Coca Cola GM.

== Achievements ==
- Coca Cola GM: 1
  - Champion : 1979
