= Greenlandic Football Championship =

Top football division in Greenland

- Founded: 1954; 72 years ago
- Country: Greenland
- Number of clubs: 8 (final round)
- Level on pyramid: 1
- Current champions: Boldklubben af 1967 (17th title) (2026)
- Most championships: Boldklubben af 1967 (17 titles)
- Broadcaster(s): KNR TV
- Website: https://www.kak.gl/
- Current: 2026 Greenlandic Football Championship

The Greenlandic Football Championship (Greenlandic: Isikkamik Arsaalluni Pissartanngorniunneq, GM, Danish: Grønlandsmesterskab i fodbold) is the premier men's football competition in Greenland. It was established in 1954, and since 1971 it has been organised by the Football Association of Greenland. This association is not affiliated to FIFA or to any continental confederation.

B-67 is the most successful football team to have won the championship.

== Format ==
The championship is often called an unusual and unique tournament as the finals last only one week. This is because football clubs in the large country are so far apart. Greenland has no roads between cities, so expensive air or lengthy sea travel is needed. Therefore the competition has several regional qualifiers, hosted at a single location, before the finals of 8 teams (as of 2022) are hosted at a single location, which changes year-on-year. These locations have included Ammassalik, Nanortalik and Kangaatsiaq.

== Previous winners ==
List of Greenlandic Champions

Season	Champions (number of titles)	Host City
GIF Championships
1954–55	Nuuk IL (1)	Ilulissat
1958	Grønlands Seminarius Sportklub (1)	Qaqortoq
1959–60	Nanok-50 (1)	Nuuk
1963–64	Kissaviarsuk-33 (1)	Nuuk
1966–67	Kissaviarsuk-33 (2)	Nuuk
1967–68	Tupilak-41 (1)	Nuuk
1969	Kissaviarsuk-33 (3)	Nuuk
1970	Tupilak-41 (2)	Sisimiut
GBU Championships
1971	Tupilak-41 (3)	Nuuk
1972	Grønlands Seminarius Sportklub (2)	Nuuk
1973	Grønlands Seminarius Sportklub (3)	Nuuk
1974	Siumut Amerdlok Kunuk (1)	Sisimiut
1975	Grønlands Seminarius Sportklub (4)	Aasiaat
1976	Grønlands Seminarius Sportklub (5)	Nuuk
1977	Nagdlunguaq-48 (1)	Sisimiut
1978	Nagdlunguaq-48 (2)	Nuuk
1979	CIF-70 Qasigiannguit (1)	Aasiaat
1980	Nagdlunguaq-48 (3)	Qaqortoq
1981	Nuuk IL (2)	Sisimiut
1982	Nagdlunguaq-48 (4)	Nuuk

Season	Champions (number of titles)	Host City
1983	Nagdlunguaq-48 (5)	Paamiut
1984	Nagdlunguaq-48 (6)	Ilulissat
1985	Nuuk IL (3)	Nuuk
1986	Nuuk IL (4)	Nuuk
1987	Kissaviarsuk-33 (4)	Maniitsoq
1988	Kissaviarsuk-33 (5)	Aasiaat
1989	Kagssagssuk Maniitsoq (1)	Qaqortoq
1990	Nuuk IL (5)	Nuuk
1991	Kissaviarsuk-33 (6)	Sisimiut
1992	Aqigssiaq Maniitsoq (1)	Ilulissat
1993	B-67 Nuuk (1)	Qaqortoq
1994	B-67 Nuuk (2)	Nuuk
1995	Kugsak-45 (1)	Sisimiut
1996	B-67 Nuuk (3)	Nuuk
1997	Nuuk IL (6)	Maniitsoq
1998	Kissaviarsuk-33 (7)	Qaqortoq
1999	B-67 Nuuk (4)	Nuuk
2000	Nagdlunguaq-48 (7)	Qasigiannguit
2001	Nagdlunguaq-48 (8)	Sisimiut
2002	Kugsak-45 (2)	Ilulissat
2003	Kissaviarsuk-33 (8)	Qaqortoq
2004	FC Malamuk (1)	Nuuk

Season	Champions (number of titles)	Host City
2005	B-67 Nuuk (5)	Uummannaq
2006	Nagdlunguaq-48 (9)	Sisimiut
2007	Nagdlunguaq-48 (10)	Nuuk
2008	B-67 Nuuk (6)	Qaqortoq
2009	Godhavn-44 (1)	Qeqertarsuaq
2010	B-67 Nuuk (7)	Nuuk
2011	Godhavn-44 (2)	Sisimiut
2012	B-67 Nuuk (8)	Ilulissat
2013	B-67 Nuuk (9)	Qaqortoq
2014	B-67 Nuuk (10)	Nuuk
2015	B-67 Nuuk (11)	Qasigiannguit
2016	B-67 Nuuk (12)	Nuuk
2017	Inuit Timersoqatigiiffiat-79 (1)	Qeqertarsuaq
2018	B-67 Nuuk (13)	Nuuk
2019	Nagdlunguaq-48 (11)	Sisimiut
2020	Canceled due to the COVID-19 pandemic	
2021	Canceled due to the COVID-19 pandemic	
2022	Nagdlunguaq-48 (12)	Ilulissat
2023	B-67 Nuuk (14)	Qaqortoq
2024	B-67 Nuuk (15)	Qeqertarsuaq
2025	B-67 Nuuk (16)	Nuuk
2026	B-67 Nuuk (17)	Maniitsoq

== Champions ==
Club	Wins	Winning years
Boldklubben af 1967	17	1993, 1994, 1996, 1999, 2005, 2008, 2010, 2012, 2013, 2014, 2015, 2016, 2018, 2023, 2024, 2025, 2026
Nagdlunguaq-48	12	1977, 1978, 1980, 1982, 1983, 1984, 2000, 2001, 2006, 2007, 2019, 2022
Kissaviarsuk-33	8	1964, 1967, 1969, 1987, 1988, 1991, 1998, 2003
Nuuk IL	6	1955, 1981, 1985, 1986, 1990, 1997
Grønlands Seminarius Sportklub	5	1958, 1972, 1973, 1975, 1976
Tupilak-41	3	1968, 1970, 1971
Kugsak-45	2	1995, 2002
G-44 Qeqertarsuaq	2	2009, 2011
Nanok-50 (Note: Disbanded club.)	1	1960
Siumut Amerdlok Kunuk	1	1974
CIF-70 Qasigiannguit	1	1979
Kagssagssuk Maniitsoq	1	1989
Aqigssiaq Maniitsoq	1	1992
FC Malamuk	1	2004
Inuit Timersoqatigiiffiat-79	1	2017

== See also ==
- Association football in Greenland
- ConIFA
- Greenland Cup
