= Qaqortoq Stadium =

Stadium in Qaqortoq, Greenland for football matches

- Interactive map of Qaqortoq Stadium
- Location: Qaqortoq, Greenland
- Coordinates: 60°43′32″N 46°2′36″W

Construction
- Groundbreaking: September 2009
- Opened: 13 September 2010
- Cost: $ 500,000

Tenant
- Kissaviarsuk-33

The Qaqortoq Stadium is a stadium in Qaqortoq, Greenland. It was completed in September 2010, and it hosts football matches.

== History ==
The conditions in Greenland meant that matches could only be played between May and September, and on sand and ash pitches as grass cannot be easily grown in the harsh environment. However the Danish Football Association, with financing by the FIFA Goal Programme began laying an artificial grass pitch in the Southern town of Qaqortoq in September 2009. The pitch cost $500,000, of which $400,000 was provided by the FIFA Goal Programme.

The venue was handed over to Greenland Football Association president Lars Lundblad by FIFA president Joseph Blatter and DBU president Allan Hansen on 13 September 2010. Qaqortoq mayor Kristine Raahauge said that "Local residents can play sport at any time now, and this has already helped us to reduce the crime rate."
