= Siuteroq Nanortalik-43 =

Greenlandic football club

- Founded: 1943
- League: Greenlandic Football Championship
- 2022: DNQ
- Website: https://www.facebook.com/people/siuteroq-43/100041232345783/

Siuteroq Nanortalik-43 is a Greenlandic football club based in Nanortalik. Founded 2 November 1943, the team plays in the Greenlandic Football Championship. The club has won its regional Nann-Cup four times but has never won the national championship.
