= Aqigssiaq Maniitsoq =

Greenlandic sports club

- Full name: Aqigssiaq Maniitsoq
- Founded: 25 May 1971
- Ground: Maniitsoq Stadium; Maniitsoq, Greenland
- League: Coca Cola GM
| Home colours | Away colours |

Aqigssiaq Maniitsoq is a sports club from Greenland based in Maniitsoq. They compete in the Coca Cola GM.

== Achievements ==
- Coca Cola GM: 1
  - Champion : 1992
