= Narsaq-85 =

Football club based in Narsaq, Greenland

- Full name: Timersoqatigiiffik Narsaq 1985
- Founded: 1985
- Ground: Narsaq Stadium; Narsaq, Greenland
- League: Coca Cola GM
| Home colours | Away colours |

Narsaq-85 is a football club based in Narsaq, Greenland. They play in the Coca Cola GM.
