= Grønlands Seminariums Sportklub =

Greenlandic sports club

GSS Nuuk
- Full name: Timersoqatigiiffiat Sportsforeningen Grønlands Seminariums Sportklub Nuuk
- Founded: 1944
- Ground: Nuuk Stadium; Nuuk, Greenland
- Capacity: 2,000
- Chairman: Martin Dansby
- Manager: Olhest Gadtav
- League: Coca Cola GM
Home colours	Away colours

Timersoqatigiiffiat Sportsforeningen Grønlands Seminariums Sportklub (also known as GSS Nuuk) is a sports club from Greenland based in Nuuk. They compete in football, handball and volleyball.

== Achievements ==
- Greenlandic Football Championship: 4
  - Champion : 1972, 1973, 1975, 1976
- Women's Greenlandic Football Championship: 2
  - Champion : 2018, 2019

== Notable Former Players ==
- (Greenland) Asii Berthelsen (2018-2019)
