= Ilulissat-69 =

Sports Club from Ilulissat

I-69
- Full name: Ilulissat-69
- Nickname: I-69
- Founded: 1969

I-69 is a sports club from Greenland based in Ilulissat. They compete in football, futsal, handball, and volleyball.

== Achievements ==
- Greenlandic Women's Football Championship: 7
  - Champion: 1995, 1996, 1997, 1998, 1999, 2000, 2003
  - Second: 2002
  - Third: 1988
- Greenlandic Men's Handball Championship: 5
  - Champion: 1985, 1987, 1988, 1989, 1990
- Greenlandic Women's Handball Championship: 2
  - Champion: 1982, 1989
