= Tupilak-41 =

Greenlandic sports club

- Full name: Timersoqatigiiffik Tupilak
- Founded: 1941
- Ground: Aasiaat Stadium; Aasiaat, Greenland
- League: Coca Cola GM
- 2015: 5th
Home colours	Away colours

Tupilak-41 is a sports club from Greenland based in Aasiaat, after having relocated from Qaanaaq. They compete in the Coca Cola GM.

== Achievements ==
- Coca Cola GM: 1
  - Champion : 1971
  - Youth Champion : 1997
