= Siumut Amerdlok Kunuk =

Greenlandic football club

- Full name: Timersoqatigiiffik Siumut Amerdlok Kunuk
- Founded: 1951
- Ground: Sisimiut Stadium; Sisimiut, Greenland
- Capacity: 500
- League: Coca Cola GM
Home colours	Away colours

Timersoqatigiiffik Siumut Amerdlok Kunuk is an association football club based in Sisimiut, Greenland. They play in the Coca Cola GM.

== Achievements ==
- Coca Cola GM: 1
  - Champion: 1974
