= Nagdlunguaq-48 =

Greenlandic sports club

- Full name: Timersoqatigiiffik Sportsclub Nagdlunguak 1948
- Nickname: N-48
- Founded: 8 February 1948
- Ground: Arsaattarfik; Ilulissat, Greenland
- Capacity: 2,000
- Manager: Niels Thomsen, Lars Erik Gabrielsen
- League: Greenlandic Football Championship
- 2022: Greenlandic Football Championship, 1st
Home colours	Away colours

Nagdlunguak 1948 is a sports club from Greenland based in Ilulissat. However, all league games are played in the national stadium in Nuuk.

N-48 have been national football champions twelve times. They beat B-67 Nuuk 2-2, 6–5 on penalties in the 2022 final.

== Achievements ==
- Greenlandic Football Championship: 12
  - Champion : 1977, 1978, 1980, 1982, 1983, 1984, 2000, 2001, 2006, 2007, 2019, 2022

== Squad ==
As of December 5, 2021

Note: Flags indicate national team as defined under FIFA eligibility rules; some limited exceptions apply. Players may hold more than one non-FIFA nationality.

No.	Pos.	Nation	Player
1	GK	GRL	Gabriel Petersen
2	DF	GRL	Karl-Peter Street
3	MF	GRL	Niklas Thustrup Johansen
4	DF	GRL	Minik Olsvig Svendsen
5	MF	GRL	Lars-Erik Reimer
6	MF	GRL	Søren Kreutzmann
7	FW	GRL	Nick Reimer
8	FW	GRL	Markus Jensen
9	MF	GRL	Aputsiaq Gabrielsen
10	DF	GRL	Bruno Sandgreen
11	DF	GRL	Peter Leibhardt
13	FW	GRL	Nukannguaq Petersen
14	DF	GRL	Kaali Lund Mathaeussen
15	DF	GRL	Peter Rosbach
17	FW	GRL	Hans Kristiansen
18	MF	GRL	Karl Louis Sandgreen
19	DF	GRL	Patrick Brummerstedt Larsen
20	MF	GRL	Isak Høy
21	MF	GRL	Hans Peter Pars
