= Kissaviarsuk-33 =

- Full name: Timerssoĸatigîgfik K'aĸortoĸ Kissaviarsuk 1933
- Founded: 17 June 1933; 93 years ago, as Kigssaviarssuk-33
- Ground: Qaqortoq Stadium, Qaqortoq, Greenland
- President: Kent Kielsen
- Manager: Angutitsiaq Høy Poulsen
- League: Greenlandic Football Championship
- 2022: Greenlandic Football Championship, 7th
Home colours	Away colours

Kissaviarsuk-33 is a sports club from Greenland based in Qaqortoq. They compete in football, badminton and handball. Formed in 1933, they are the oldest sports club still playing football in Greenland.

== Achievements ==
- Greenlandic Football Championship: 8
  - Champion : 1964, 1967, 1969, 1987, 1988, 1991, 1998, 2003
