= Nuuk Idraetslag =

Greenlandic sports club

- Full name: Timerssokatigigfik Nuuk Il
- Nickname: NÛK
- Founded: 1934
- Ground: Nuuk Stadium; Nuuk, Greenland
- Capacity: 2,000
- Chairman: Minik "Master" Kleemann #6
- Manager: Sofus "Aka-D" E. Olsen
- League: Coca Cola GM
Home colours	Away colours

Timerssokatigigfik Nuuk Il (also known as Nuuk Idraetslag, NÛK or Nuuk IL) is a sports club from Greenland based in Nuuk. They compete in men's and women's association football and handball.

== Honours ==
=== Football ===
- Coca Cola GM: 5
  - Champion : 1981, 1985, 1986, 1988, 1990
- Coca Cola GM Women's: 4
  - Champion : 2001, 2002, 2004, 2005
  - second : 1997, 1998, 1999, 2003

=== Handball ===
- Greenlandic Men's Handball Championship: 11
  - Champion : 1978, 1991, 1994, 1995, 1996, 1997, 1998, 1999, 2001, 2002, 2004
