= Football Association of Greenland =

- Founded: 4 July 1971; 55 years ago
- Headquarters: Nuuk
- President: Kenneth Kleist
- Website: https://kak.gl

The Football Association of Greenland (Greenlandic: Kalaallit Arsaattartuta Kattuffiat; Danish: Grønlands Boldspil-Union) (KAK) is the governing body of association football in the island country of Greenland. The KAK was founded on 4 July 1971. It runs the men's national team, women's national team, men's futsal team, women's futsal team, and multiple national championships, from the men's and women's national championships through youth, veterans and futsal variations. Greenland also held three editions of a men's national football friendly tournament, known as the Greenland Cup, from 1980 to 1984. The Greenland Football Association applied to join CONCACAF, a continental body of FIFA, on 13 May 2024.

In June 2025, during its 28th Extraordinary Congress CONCACAF president Victor Montagliani announced that Greenland's membership was unanimously rejected.

== Overview ==
Greenland is not a member of FIFA and therefore cannot qualify for the FIFA World Cup. In addition, Greenland is neither a member of CONCACAF or UEFA – the regional governing bodies of North American and Europe, respectively. An artificial grass pitch was laid at Nuuk Stadium in 2016, which FIFA now allows, but the stadium still lacks other required features. Following the entry of Gibraltar into UEFA and later FIFA, Greenland may be the next to try to enter. However, the organization did join the Confederation of Independent Football Associations (ConIFA) in May 2016. With the update of UEFA's statutes to forbid the admission of football associations from non-independent regions, Greenland found their path to UEFA membership closed. As of 2022, they have decided to apply to the other confederation which they would be eligible to do so, CONCACAF, in the hopes that this would prove more successful. On 28 May 2024, Greenland officially applied for full CONCACAF membership. In June 2025, during its 28th Extraordinary Congress Concacaf President and FIFA Vice President Victor Montagliani announced that Greenland's membership was unanimously rejected.

Football is the most popular sport in Greenland with about 5,500 players, out of a population of ~55,000. The Greenland Football Federation was started in 1971 and they have their office in Nuuk. In Greenland, football can usually be played outside from the end of May until the middle of September, with the south of Greenland able to play for longer than in the north. Initially, all the football grounds were sand pitches or gravel pitches, with this limiting the quality of the football that could be played. However, many pitches were upgraded as part of FIFA's Goal Program, which allowed for several artificial pitches to be constructed. Today there are such pitches in Nuuk, Qeqertarsuaq, Sisimiut, Uummannaq, Nanortalik and more. Many towns also have indoor halls and the football players play indoor football from October to about April, with futsal being a popular sport. Greenland is building more indoor stadiums so the game can be played all year round and under FIFA requirements, this is similar to what Iceland have accomplished in recent history.

== KAK Presidency ==
- ??? (1971-2011)
- Lars Lundblad (2011-2014)
- John Thorsen (2014-2017 and 2017-2019)
- Gert Fleischer (interim July-October 2017)
- Finn Meinel (2019-2021)
- Benjamin Kielsen (2021-2023)
- Kenneth Kleist (2023-)

== See also ==
- Greenland national football team
- Greenlandic Football Championship
- Sport in Greenland
