= 1976 Greenlandic Men's Handball Championship =

Greenlandic Men's Handball Championship
- Season: 1976
- Dates: May 1976
- Champion: GSS; 2nd title
- Matches played: 9
- Goals scored: 414 (46 per match)
- All statistics correct as of 11 June 2020.

The 1976 Greenlandic Men's Handball Championship (also known as the Danish: GM i håndbold or Greenlandic: håndboldimik píssartángomiúneri) was the third edition of the Greenlandic Men's Handball Championship. It was held in Nuuk. It was won by GSS who defeated B-67 in the final.

== Venues ==
The championship was played at the Godthåbhallen in Nuuk.

Nuuk	1976 Greenlandic Men's Handball Championship is located in Greenland
Godthåbhallen	1976 Greenlandic Men's Handball Championship is located in Greenland
Capacity: 1.000	1976 Greenlandic Men's Handball Championship is located in Greenland

== Modus ==
Location of teams

The six teams were split into two groups. And they played a round robin.

The third placed teams played a fifth place game, the second best the small final and the group winners the final.

== Results ==
=== Group stage ===
==== Group I ====
Pos	Team	Pld	W	D	L	GF	GA	GD	Pts	Qualification or relegation
1	GSS	2	2	0	0	53	37	+16	4	Qualification to Final
2	S-68	2	1	0	1	46	40	+6	2	Qualification to Small Final
3	NÛK	2	0	0	2	33	55	−22	0	Qualification to 5th Place Game

Updated to match(es) played on unknown. Source:

GSS	29-17	NÛK	Godthåbhallen, Nuuk

GSS	24-20	S-68	Godthåbhallen, Nuuk

S-68	26-16	NÛK	Godthåbhallen, Nuuk

==== Group II ====
Pos	Team	Pld	W	D	L	GF	GA	GD	Pts	Qualification or relegation
1	B-67	2	2	0	0	58	48	+10	4	Qualification to Final
2	K-33	2	1	0	1	60	48	+12	2	Qualification to Small Final
3	SAK	2	0	0	2	40	62	−22	0	Qualification to 5th Place Game

Updated to match(es) played on unknown. Source:

K-33	25-31	B-67	Godthåbhallen, Nuuk

SAK	23-27	B-67	Godthåbhallen, Nuuk

K-33	35-17	SAK	Godthåbhallen, Nuuk

=== Championship ===
==== 5th Place Game ====
NÛK	28-20	SAK	Godthåbhallen, Nuuk

==== Small Final ====
K-33	14-24	S-68	Godthåbhallen, Nuuk

==== Final ====
B-67	15-23	GSS	Godthåbhallen, Nuuk

== Final ranking ==
Rank	Team
1st place, gold medalist(s)	GSS
2nd place, silver medalist(s)	B-67
3rd place, bronze medalist(s)	S-68
4	K-33
5	NÛK
6	SAK
