= 1975 Greenlandic Women's Handball Championship =

First edition of the Greenlandic Women's Handball Championship

Greenlandic Women's Handball Championship
- Season: 1975
- Dates: 24 - 17 April 1975
- Champion: NÛK
- Matches played: 10
- Goals scored: 184 (18.4 per match)
- All statistics correct as of 11 June 2020.

The 1975 Greenlandic Women's Handball Championship (also known as the Danish: GM i håndbold or Greenlandic: håndboldimik píssartángomiúneri) was the first edition of the Greenlandic Women's Handball Championship. It was held in Nuuk. It was won by NÛK.

== Venues ==
The championship was played at the Godthåbhallen in Nuuk.

Nuuk	1975 Greenlandic Women's Handball Championship is located in Greenland
Godthåbhallen	1975 Greenlandic Women's Handball Championship is located in Greenland
Capacity: 1.000	1975 Greenlandic Women's Handball Championship is located in Greenland

== Table ==
Location of teams

Pos	Team	Pld	W	D	L	GF	GA	GD	Pts
1	NÛK	4	4	0	0	69	22	+47	8
2	S-68	4	3	0	1	36	23	+13	6
3	B-67	4	2	0	2	40	27	+13	4
4	K-33	4	1	0	3	27	36	−9	2
5	Kagssagssuk Maniitsoq	4	0	0	4	12	76	−64	0

Updated to match(es) played on unknown. Source:
Rules for classification: 1) points; 2) points against team involved.

== Results ==
S-68	10-9	B-67	Godthåbhallen, Nuuk

NÛK	34-2	Kagssagssuk Maniitsoq	Godthåbhallen, Nuuk

B-67	19-3	Kagssagssuk Maniitsoq	Godthåbhallen, Nuuk

S-68	7-9	NÛK	Godthåbhallen, Nuuk

K-33	6-8	B-67	Godthåbhallen, Nuuk

Kagssagssuk Maniitsoq	4-12	S-68	Godthåbhallen, Nuuk

K-33	9-18	NÛK	Godthåbhallen, Nuuk

Kagssagssuk Maniitsoq	3-11	K-33	Godthåbhallen, Nuuk

K-33	1-7	S-68	Godthåbhallen, Nuuk

NÛK	8-4	B-67	Godthåbhallen, Nuuk
