= Peter Buehning =

Peter Buehning may refer to:

- Peter Buehning Sr. (1930–2003), American handball player
- Peter Buehning Jr. (born 1954), American handball player
