= Pan-American Team Handball Federation =

Former governing body of handball in Pan-America

Pan-American Team Handball Federation (PATHF)
- Logo of Pan-American Team Handball Federation
- Successor: North America and the Caribbean Handball Confederation, South and Central America Handball Confederation
- Formation: 23 May 1977; 48 years ago
- Dissolved: 3 July 2019; 6 years ago
- Type: Sports Federation
- Headquarters: Buenos Aires, Argentina
- Region served: Americas
- Members: 26 Member Federations
- Official language: Spanish and English
- President: First — Dr. Peter Buehning Sr. (United States); Last — Mario Moccia (Argentina)
- Secretary General: First — Walter Schwedhelm (Mexico); Last — Héctor Fernández Bogdanic (Chile)
- Website: www.PanAmHandball.org

The Pan-American Team Handball Federation (PATHF) has been the continental governing body for handball, beach handball, wheelchair handball and snow handball in Americas since 23 May 1977. PATHF includes North America, Central America, South America and the Caribbean. PATHF's primary functions is to organize competitions for national teams and clubs, and to conduct Men's World Handball Championship and Women's World Handball Championship qualifying tournaments.

On 14 January 2018, during the IHF Council meeting, PATHF was suspended by International Handball Federation and was divided into two continental confederations namely the North America and the Caribbean Handball Confederation and the South and Central America Handball Confederation. The IHF Council decision was taken on the facts that there are no signs of development in the level of handball and beach handball in the North American, Central American and the Caribbean countries. There was some development in South American level but that was also not comparable to the other continents like Europe, Asia and Africa. No team from Americas had ever reached to the semifinal stage of the IHF World Men's Handball Championship and the IHF Men's Junior World Championship till date. The PATHF appealed to the Court of Arbitration for Sport, and it annulled IHF's decision. At the Extraordinary IHF Congress 2019 the IHF statues were revised to add the new federations.

== History ==
PATHF was founded on 23 May 1977, which made it one of the five continental confederations affiliated with International Handball Federation. Argentina, Chile, Canada, Mexico and the United States of America were founding members. The first executive committee was composed of President Dr. Peter Buehning Sr. (USA), Vice-President Mr. Juan Mainzhausen (Argentina), Secretary General Mr. Walter Schwedhelm (Mexico), and Treasurer Mr. Francis Geulen (Canada). Current PATHF President is Mr. Mario Moccia from Argentina.

== PATHF Presidents ==
No.	Name	Country	Tenure
1	Peter Buehning Sr.	United States	1977–1980
2	Walter Schwedhelm	Mexico	1980–1984
3	Andy Meszey	Canada	1984–1987
4	Peter Buehning Sr.	United States	1987–1996
5	Rubén Gómez	Uruguay	1996 (interim)
6	Manoel Luiz Oliveira	Brazil	1996–2012
7	Mario Moccia	Argentina	2012 – 11 June 2019
	Júlio Noveri (Interim President)	Uruguay	11 June 2019 – 3 July 2019

^1 Mario Moccia resigned on 11 June 2019, Júlio Noveri took over as Interim President.
^2 PATHF was succeeded by NACHC and SCAHC as per the decision of Extraordinary IHF Congress held at Gothenburg (Sweden) on 3 July 2019.

== PATHF Council ==
The PATHF Council was an institution of the Pan-American Team Handball Federation. It was the main decision-making body of the organization in the intervals of PATHF Congress. It also had a subsidiary i.e. PATHF Executive Committee, which takes decisions during the intervals of Council Meetings. PATHF Executive Committee was formed of the President, 1st Vice-President, 2nd Vice-President, Secretary General and Treasurer. Following was the last PATHF Council elected for the years 2016 – 2020 before PATHF's dissolution on 14 January 2018 by the International Handball Federation.

Designation	Name	Country
President	Mario Moccia	Argentina
1st Vice-President	Júlio Noveri	Uruguay
2nd Vice-President	Rafael Sepúlveda Montalvo	Puerto Rico
Secretary General	Héctor Fernández Bogdanic	Chile
Treasurer	Carlos Ferrea	Argentina
IHF Continental Representative	Mario García de la Torre	Mexico
South America Vice-President	Gerardo Paniagua	Paraguay
Central America Vice-President	Dr. Carlos Morales Sosa	Guatemala
Caribbean Vice-President	Néstor Milete Echevarría	Puerto Rico
North America Vice-President	Bryan Hayes	Canada
Chairman of the Competition Commission	Carlos González Aldea	Cuba
Chairman of the Referees Commission	Sálvio Sedrez	Brazil

== PATHF Commissions ==
Commission	Chairman	Country
PATHF Commission of Organizing and Competitions	Carlos González Aldea	Cuba
PATHF Playing Rules and Referee Commission	Sálvio Sedrez	Brazil
PATHF Commission for Development	Rafael Sepúlveda Montalvo	Puerto Rico
PATHF Commission of Coaching and Methods	Mike Cavanaugh	United States
PATHF Medical Commission	Llew Harper	Barbados
PATHF Marketing Commission	Gabriel Klein	Argentina
PATHF Discipline Tribunal	Daniel Cánepa	Argentina
PATHF Appeals Tribunal	Héctor Alvarado Véliz	El Salvador
PATHF Juridical Commission	Rafael Sepúlveda Montalvo	Puerto Rico
PATHF Beach Handball Commission	Luiz Filipe Galvão	Brazil
PATHF Wheelchair Handball Commission	Germán Bonnemezón	Argentina

== Affiliated members ==
=== North America and the Caribbean ===
- Barbados
- Canada
- Cuba
- Dominican Republic
- Greenland
- Haiti
- Mexico
- Puerto Rico
- Trinidad and Tobago
- United States of America

=== Central America ===
- Costa Rica
- El Salvador
- Guatemala
- Honduras
- Nicaragua
- Panama

=== South America ===
- Argentina
- Bolivia
- Brazil
- Chile
- Colombia
- Ecuador
- Paraguay
- Peru
- Uruguay
- Venezuela

=== Non-Members ===
Following is the list of national handball federations who are affiliated to the International Handball Federation but are not granted affiliation by the PATHF.

- Antigua and Barbuda
- (The Bahamas) Bahamas
- British Virgin Islands
- Cayman Islands
- Dominica
- Grenada
- Saint Kitts and Nevis
- Saint Lucia
- Belize
- Guyana

Regional Member

- French Guiana (France)
- Guadeloupe (France)
- Martinique (France)

== Tournaments ==
=== PATHF ===
- Pan American Men's Handball Championship
- Pan American Women's Handball Championship
- Pan American Men's Junior Handball Championship
- Pan American Women's Junior Handball Championship
- Pan American Men's Youth Handball Championship
- Pan American Women's Youth Handball Championship
- Pan American Men's Cadet Handball Championship
- Pan American Women's Cadet Handball Championship
- Pan American Games

=== Club ===
- Pan American Men's Club Handball Championship
- Pan American Women's Club Handball Championship
- South American Men's Club Handball Championship (defunct)
- South American Women's Club Handball Championship (defunct)

=== Beach ===
- Pan American Beach Handball Championship
- Pan American Youth Beach Handball Championship
- Bolivarian Beach Games
- South American Beach Games

=== South America ===
- South American Handball Championship
- South American Junior Handball Championship
- South American Youth Handball Championship
- South American Cadet Handball Championship
- South American U14 Handball Championship
- South American Games
- Bolivarian Games

=== Central America ===
- Central American Handball Championship
- Central American Games
- Central American and Caribbean Games

=== North America and Caribbean ===
- Caribbean Handball Championship
- Nor.Ca. Handball Championship

== Current champions ==
	Men's	Women's
Senior Handball	Brazil (2016) (3)	Brazil (2017) (10*)
Pan American Games	Brazil (2015) (3)	Brazil (2015) (5*)
Junior Handball	Brazil (2017) (6)	Brazil (2016) (8*)
Youth Handball	Argentina (2017) (8*)	Brazil (2016) (11*)
IHF Trophy (Continental Phase)	United States (2017)	Martinique (2017)
Beach Handball	United States (2016) (1)	Uruguay (2016) (2)
Youth Beach Handball	Brazil (2017) (1*)	Argentina (2017) (1*)
Club Handball	(Brazil) EC Pinheiros (2017) (2)	(Brazil) EC Pinheiros (2017) (1)

(Titles) (*) Record titles
