= Pan American Wheelchair Handball Championship =

National wheelchair handball competition

- Current season, competition or edition: 2019 Pan American Wheelchair Handball Championship
- Sport: Wheelchair handball
- First season: 2014
- No. of teams: 2–9
- Continent: Pan America
- Most titles: Brazil (6 titles)

The Pan American Wheelchair Handball Championship is the official competition for senior national Wheelchair handball teams of Pan America. It has two categories 7 versus 7 and 4 versus 4 players.

== Tournaments ==
Year	Host	Location	Genders
2014	Argentina	Buenos Aires	Men's and Women's
2019	Brazil	São Paulo	Women's

== Results ==
=== Men's ===
==== Men's 7x7 ==== : Year / Champions / Runners-up / 3rd place / Teams; 2014 / Brazil / Argentina / Panama / 6	==== Men's 4x4 ==== Cat A: Year / Champions / Runners-up / 3rd place / Teams; 2014 / Argentina / Brazil / Panama / 7; Cat B: Year / Champions / Runners-up / 3rd place / Teams; 2014 / Brazil / Argentina / Chile / 9

=== Women's ===
==== Women's 7x7 ====
Year	Champions	Runners-up	3rd place	Teams
2014	Brazil	Chile	Argentina	3
2019	Brazil	Bolivia	–	2

==== Women's 4x4 ====
Year	Champions	Runners-up	3rd place	Teams
2014	Brazil	Argentina	Bolivia	4
2019	Brazil A	Bolivia	Brazil B	3

== Medal count ==
=== Men's ===
Rank	Nation	7x7				4x4				Total			
Rank	Nation	G	S	B	Total	G	S	B	Total	G	S	B	Total
1	Brazil	1	0	0	1	1	1	0	2	2	1	0	3
2	Argentina	0	1	0	1	1	1	0	2	1	2	0	3
3	Chile	0	0	0	0	0	0	1	1	0	0	1	1
4	Panama	0	0	1	1	0	0	1	1	0	0	2	2
Totals (4 nations)		1	1	1	3	2	2	2	6	3	3	3	9

=== Women's ===
Rank	Nation	7x7				4x4				Total			
Rank	Nation	G	S	B	Total	G	S	B	Total	G	S	B	Total
1	Brazil	2	0	0	2	2	0	1	3	4	0	1	5
2	Argentina	0	0	1	1	0	1	0	1	0	1	1	2
3	Bolivia	0	1	0	1	0	1	1	2	0	2	1	3
4	Chile	0	1	0	1	0	0	0	0	0	1	0	1
Totals (4 nations)		2	2	1	5	2	2	2	6	4	4	3	11

=== Total ===
Rank	Nation	7x7				4x4				Total			
Rank	Nation	G	S	B	Total	G	S	B	Total	G	S	B	Total
1	Brazil	3	0	0	3	3	1	1	5	6	1	1	8
2	Argentina	0	1	1	2	1	2	0	3	1	3	1	5
3	Bolivia	0	1	0	1	0	1	1	2	0	2	1	3
4	Chile	0	1	0	1	0	0	1	1	0	1	1	2
5	Panama	0	0	1	1	0	0	1	1	0	0	2	2
Totals (5 nations)		3	3	2	8	4	4	4	12	7	7	6	20
