= Greenland Handball Federation =

Governing body of handball in Greenland

Greenland Handball Federation Greenlandic: Kalaalit Nunaanni Assammik Arsartartut Kattuffiat Danish: Grønlands Handbold Forbund GHF
- IOC nation: Greenland (GRL)
- Sport: Handball
- Other sports: Beach Handball; Wheelchair Handball
- Official website: www.ghf.gl

HISTORY
- Year of formation: 11 May 1974; 50 years ago

AFFILIATIONS
- International federation: International Handball Federation (IHF)
- IHF member since: 1998; 27 years ago
- Continental association: Pan-American Team Handball Federation
- Other affiliation(s): Sports Confederation of Greenland

GOVERNING BODY
- President: Mr. Boas Møller (Greenland)

HEADQUARTERS
- Address: Godthåbhallen, Nuuk
- Country: Greenland (Denmark)
- Secretary General: Mr. Kurt Lauritsen (Greenland)

FINANCE
- Sponsors: Hummel International

The Greenland Handball Federation (GHF) (Danish: Grønlands Handbold Forbund) is the governing body of handball and beach handball in Greenland. GHF was founded on 11 May 1974, joined International Handball Federation in 1998 and Pan-American Team Handball Federation. GHF is also affiliated with the Sports Confederation of Greenland. It is based in Nuuk.

== Competitions ==
- Greenlandic Men's Handball Championship
- Greenlandic Women's Handball Championship

== National teams ==
- Greenland men's national handball team
- Greenland women's national handball team
