= Pan American Women's 4x4 Wheelchair Handball Championship =

International wheelchair handball competition

- Current season, competition or edition: 2019 Pan American Women's 4x4 Wheelchair Handball Championship
- Sport: Wheelchair handball
- First season: 2014
- No. of teams: 3–4
- Continent: Pan America
- Most recent champion: Brazil (2nd title)
- Most titles: Brazil (2 titles)

The Pan American Women's 4x4 Wheelchair Handball Championship is the official competition for senior national Wheelchair handball teams of Pan America.

== Tournaments ==
Year	Host	Final			3rd place match			Teams
Year	Host	Champions	Points	Runners-up	3rd place	Points	4th place	Teams
2014; Details	Argentina	Brazil	6–4	Argentina	Bolivia	2–0	Chile	4
2019; Details	Brazil	Brazil A	4–2	Brazil B	Bolivia	0	–	3

== Medal count ==
Rank	Nation	Gold	Silver	Bronze	Total
1	Brazil	2	1	0	3
2	Argentina	0	1	0	1
3	Bolivia	0	0	2	2
Totals (3 entries)		2	2	2	6
