= 1975 Greenlandic Men's Handball Championship =

Greenlandic Men's Handball Championship
- Season: 1975
- Dates: 24 - 17 April 1975
- Champion: S-68
- Matches played: 10
- Goals scored: 362 (36.2 per match)
- All statistics correct as of 11 June 2020.

The 1975 Greenlandic Men's Handball Championship (also known as the Danish: GM i håndbold or Greenlandic: håndboldimik píssartángomiúneri) was the 2nd edition of the Greenlandic Men's Handball Championship. It was held in Nuuk. It was won by S-68.

== Venues ==
The championship was played at the Godthåbhallen in Nuuk.

Nuuk	1975 Greenlandic Men's Handball Championship is located in Greenland
Godthåbhallen	1975 Greenlandic Men's Handball Championship is located in Greenland
Capacity: 1.000	1975 Greenlandic Men's Handball Championship is located in Greenland

== Table ==
Location of teams

Pos	Team	Pld	W	D	L	GF	GA	GD	Pts
1	S-68	4	3	0	1	69	73	−4	6
2	K-33	4	3	0	1	57	47	+10	6
3	GSS	4	2	0	2	92	83	+9	4
4	B-67	4	1	0	3	73	77	−4	2
5	NÛK	4	1	0	3	71	82	−11	2

Updated to match(es) played on unknown. Source:
Rules for classification: 1) points; 2) points against team involved.

== Results ==
S-68	18-16	B-67	Godthåbhallen, Nuuk

GSS	24-26	NÛK	Godthåbhallen, Nuuk

K-33	16-14	GSS	Godthåbhallen, Nuuk

NÛK	20-22	S-68	Godthåbhallen, Nuuk

K-33	8-11	S-68	Godthåbhallen, Nuuk

NÛK	18-19	B-67	Godthåbhallen, Nuuk

GSS	29-18	S-68	Godthåbhallen, Nuuk

K-33	16-15	B-67	Godthåbhallen, Nuuk

B-67	23-25	GSS	Godthåbhallen, Nuuk

K-33	17-7	NÛK	Godthåbhallen, Nuuk
