= Handball Club Toronto =

HC Toronto
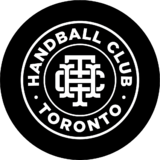
- Full name: Handball Club Toronto
- Short name: HCT, HC Toronto, Toronto HC
- Founded: 2018
- President: Alex Fragotsis
- League: North East Handball League
- Club colours
| Home | Away |

Handball Club Toronto (Ontario, Canada)

Handball Club Toronto is a handball club from Toronto, Ontario, Canada. At the time of their creation, they were the only active handball organization in the Greater Toronto Area. There are senior teams for all genders and every skill level. HC Toronto is listed under the Top 25 USA Team Handball Clubs in the 2018–19 USA Team Handball rankings. As a member of Canadian Team Handball Federation and International Handball Federation. Handball Club Toronto is competing in the Canadian and American Team Handball Nationals.

== Accomplishments ==
Senior Male Team
| Year | Ranking | Competition |
|---|---|---|
| 2018 | 5th | Michael Lipov Memorial Cup (Chicago, IL, USA) |
| 2019 | Gold | Arnold Sports Festival Handball Showcase (Columbus, OH, USA) |
| 2019 | 5th | Captain Scoot Pace Memorial Tournament (West Point, NY, USA) |
| 2019 | 4th | CTHF Senior National Men Championships (Granby, QC, Canada) |
| 2019 | 4th | Tournoi de l'action de Grâce (Montreal, QC, Canada) |
| 2019 | Silver | Toronto Cup (Barrie, ON, Canada) |
| 2022 | Gold | US Nationals Open Division 2 (Adrian, Michigan, US) |

Senior Female Team
| Year | Ranking | Competition |
|---|---|---|
| 2019 | 5th | CTHF Senior National Men Championships (Granby, QC, Canada) |
| 2019 | Silver | Toronto Cup (Barrie, ON, Canada) |
| 2022 | 6th | US Nationals (Adrian, Michigan, US) |

== Staff and Management ==
Presidents
| Season | President |
|---|---|
| 2018-2020 | Barbara Mair |
| 2020-2022 | Alexis Renaud |
| 2022-Today | Alex Fragotsis |

Senior Male Head Coaches
| Season | Head Coach |
|---|---|
| 2018-2019 | Benjamin Scheiner |
| 2019-2020 | Mihai Pantilimon |
| 2020-2022 | Alexis Renaud |
| 2022-Today | Pamela De Oliveira Souza |

Senior Female Head Coaches
| Season | Head Coach |
|---|---|
| 2018-2019 | Fab Barrillot |
| 2019-2019 | Fab Camaño |
| 2020-2020 | Lêndel Rampinelli |
| 2020-Today | Alexis Renaud |
