= Greenlandic Women's Handball Championship =

- Founded: 1975
- No. of teams: 2-9
- Country: Greenland
- Confederation: NACHC
- Most recent champion: GSS
- Most titles: NÛK (min. 9 titles)
- Level on pyramid: 1

The Greenlandic Women's Handball Championship is a handball tournament to determine the National Champion from Greenland.

== Results ==
Year	Final			3rd place match			Teams
Year	Champions	Score	Runners-up	3rd place	Score	4th place	Teams
1975; Nuuk	NÛK -1-	Round-robin	S-68	B-67	Round-robin	K-33	5
1976; Nuuk	NÛK -2-	10-5	S-68	K-33	8-7	B-67	7
1977; Nuuk	K-33 -1-		NÛK	B-67		GSS	6
1978; Qaqortoq	K-33 -2-		NÛK	I-69		S-68	6
1979; Nuuk	NÛK -3-		K-33	Kagssagssuk Maniitsoq	–	–	3
1980; Ilulissat	Kagssagssuk Maniitsoq -1-		NÛK	–	–	–	2
1981; Nuuk	B-67 -1-		K-33	Kagssagssuk Maniitsoq		SAK	7
1982; Maniitsoq	I-69 -1-		Kagssagssuk Maniitsoq	K-33	–	–	3
1983; Qaqortoq	GSS -1-		Kagssagssuk Maniitsoq	B-67		K-33	8
1984; Nuuk	Kagssagssuk Maniitsoq -2-		GSS	B-67		N-48	8
1985; Ilulissat	B-67 -2-		Kagssagssuk Maniitsoq	–	–	–	2
1986; Paamiut	Kagssagssuk Maniitsoq -3-		NÛK	I-69		B-67	8
1987; Nuuk	NÛK -4-		K-33	Kagssagssuk Maniitsoq		GSS	8
1988; Sisimiut	Kagssagssuk Maniitsoq -4-		NÛK	SAK		N-48	6
1989; Maniitsoq	I-69 -2-		Kagssagssuk Maniitsoq	B-67		NS-68	4
1990; Ilulissat	Kagssagssuk Maniitsoq -5-		K-33	I-69		SAK	6
1991; Nuuk	Kagssagssuk Maniitsoq -6-		GSS	N-48		K-33	6
1992; Qaqortoq	K-33 -1-		Kagssagssuk Maniitsoq	I-69		QAA	5
1993; Sisimiut	GSS -2-		SAK	K-33		N-48	6
1994; Nuuk	NÛK -5-		K-33	GSS		I-69	6
1995; Maniitsoq	Kagssagssuk Maniitsoq -7-		GSS	NÛK		SAK	6
1996; Nuuk	K-33 -3-		GSS	SAK		Kagssagssuk Maniitsoq	6
1997; Nuuk	NÛK -6-		GSS	Kagssagssuk Maniitsoq		Nagtoralik	7
1998; Ilulissat	NÛK -7-		SAK	GSS		I-69	9
1999; Nuuk	NÛK -8-		GSS	Kagssagssuk Maniitsoq		SAK	5
2000; Sisimiut	GSS -3-		NÛK	SAK		K-33	6
2001; Nuuk	GSS -4-		Kagssagssuk Maniitsoq	NÛK		SAK	9
2002; Sisimiut	SAK -1-		GSS	NÛK		Aqigssiaq Maniitsoq	5
2003; Qaqortoq	NÛK -9-		GSS	Kagssagssuk Maniitsoq		SAK	7
2004; Nuuk	GSS -5-		SAK	NÛK		Kagssagssuk Maniitsoq	6
2005							
2006							
2007							
2008							
2009							
2010							
2011							
2012							
2013							
2014							
2015							
2016							
2017							
2018							
2019	GSS -?-	32-16	NÛK	Nagdlunguaq	38-16	Aqigssiaq Maniitsoq	5
2020		Postponed to the fall					

Places from 1975 until 2004:
