= United States Team Handball Federation =

Governing body for handball in the United States

United States Team Handball Federation USTHF
- IOC nation: United States of America (USA)
- Sport: Handball
- Other sports: Field handball
- Official website: www.usateamhandball.org

HISTORY
- Year of formation: 1959; 67 years ago
- Year of disbandment: 2006; 20 years ago (merged into USA Team Handball)
- Superseded by: USA Team Handball

AFFILIATIONS
- International federation: International Handball Federation (IHF)
- IHF member since: 1962; 64 years ago
- Continental association: Pan-American Team Handball Federation
- National Olympic Committee: United States Olympic & Paralympic Committee
- Address: 10 Nottingham Road, Short Hills, New Jersey
- Country: United States of America

United States Team Handball Federation was the governing body for handball in the United States from 1959 until 2006. The successor USA Team Handball is funded in part by the U.S. Olympic & Paralympic Committee in 2008.

United States Team Handball Federation organized the participation of U.S. national teams in international competitions, such as the Summer Olympics and the Pan American Games.

== List of presidents ==
The first president was elected in 1959.

| Nr. | Name | From | To |
|---|---|---|---|
| 1 | Walter Schuette | 1959 | |
| 2 | Eric Ross | | 1972 |
| 3 | Peter Buehning Sr. | 1973 | 1994 |
| 4 | Thomas Rosandich | 1995 | 1995 |
| 5 | Dennis Berkholtz | 1996 | 2000 |
| 6 | Bob Djokovich | 2001 | 2004 |
| 7 | Mike Hurdle | | |

== See also ==
- USA Team Handball
- Handball in the United States
