= Pan American Women's 7x7 Wheelchair Handball Championship =

International wheelchair handball competition

- Sport: Wheelchair handball
- First season: 2014
- No. of teams: 2–3
- Continent: Pan America
- Most recent champion: Brazil (2nd title)
- Most titles: Brazil (2 titles)

The Pan American Women's 7x7 Wheelchair Handball Championship was the official competition for senior national Wheelchair handball teams of Pan America.

== Tournaments ==
Year	Host	Final			3rd place	Teams
Year	Host	Champions	Score	Runners-up	3rd place	Teams
2014; Details	Argentina	Brazil	15–7	Chile	Argentina	3
2019; Details	Brazil	Brazil	17–3	Bolivia	–	2

== Medal count ==
Rank	Nation	Gold	Silver	Bronze	Total
1	Brazil	2	0	0	2
2	Bolivia	0	1	0	1
2	Chile	0	1	0	1
4	Argentina	0	0	1	1
Totals (4 entries)		2	2	1	5
