= Handball in the United States =

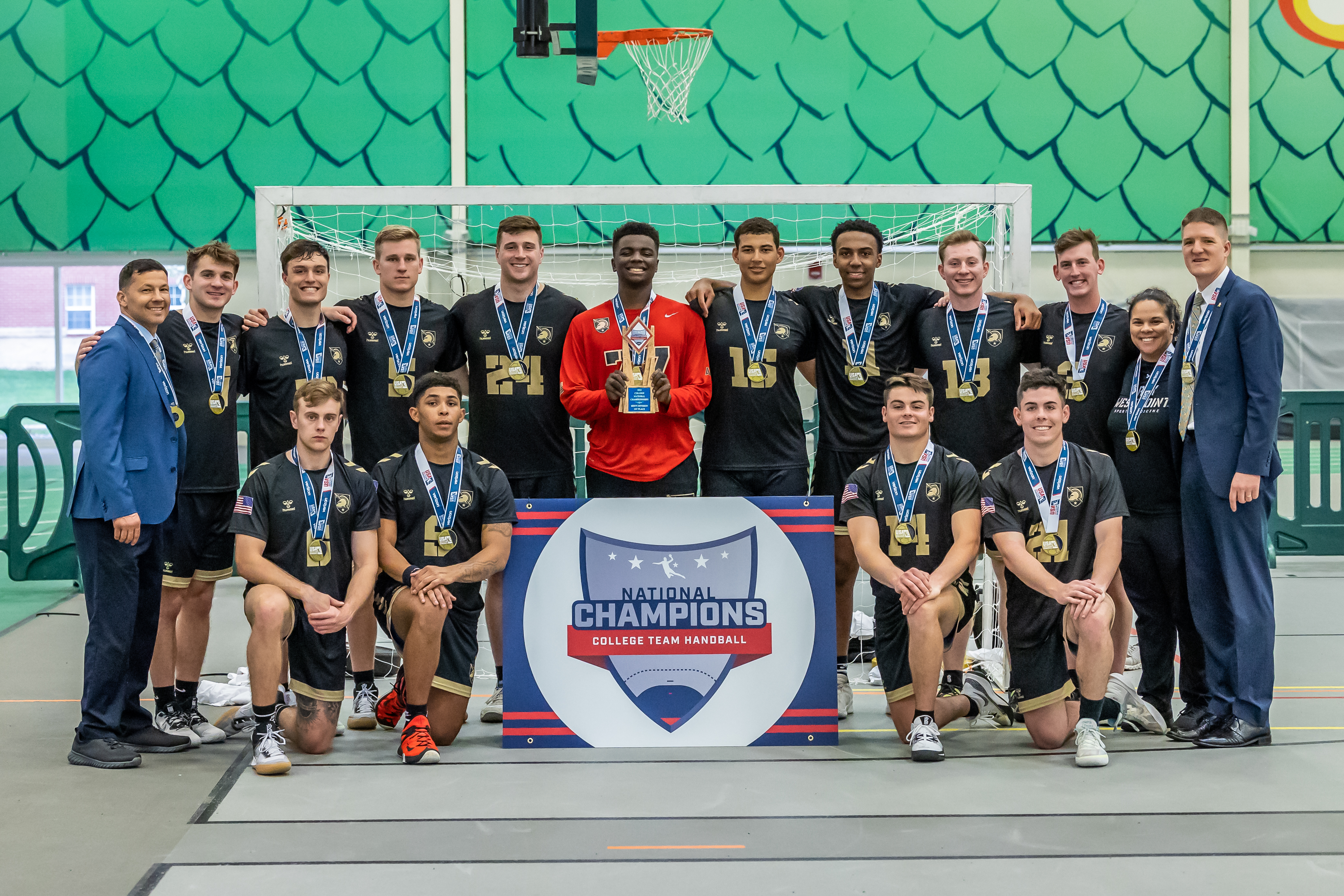
2023 College National Championship Photo at Tiffin University

Handball in the United States is a minor sport. The U.S. is represented in international competitions, such as the Summer Olympics and the Pan American Games, by the United States men's national handball team and the United States women's national handball team. The U.S. men's and women's teams have struggled in international competitions against nations where handball is more popular.

A common popular sport in European countries, handball is a minor sport in the United States with a low profile. All competitions in the U.S. are amateur. The sport is not sanctioned by the NCAA, but is played at a club level at several colleges and universities.

In 2020, a former USA Team Handball CEO Barry Siff announced the creation an American professional team handball league sponsored by Verizon, whose CEO at the time, Hans Vestberg, was a former professional handball player. The project led by a former Major Indoor Soccer League executive who planned to launch the league in 2023 with 10 teams with each team initially worth $3 million to $5 million and to have the league cooperate with NBA or NHL owners in one-tenant arena situations.

The sport is governed by USA Team Handball, which is funded in part by the U.S. Olympic Committee. Previously, the governing body was the United States Team Handball Federation (USTHF), but its status was revoked by the United States Olympic Committee in 2005.

Amateur clubs are located in most major U.S. cities and due to the great distances between clubs they mostly compete in weekend tournaments. There is one established club league, the Northeast Team Handball League in the northeastern region of the U.S. A national championship tournament is held annually with matches being played over a three-day weekend at one hosted location.

Handball is a club sport at a few notable universities, such as West Point, Ohio State University, University of North Carolina (UNC), Air Force, University of Virginia and others. Those schools play other amateur clubs and participate annually in the Collegiate National Championships, one for men and the other for women, with matches taking place over a 3-day period.

== History ==
Locations of the seven clubs in NY and NJ
Location of Union City and New York are not clear

John Jakobs was the founder of the first handball section (First German Sport Club of Brooklyn) in the USA. On 26 May 1926 he made a call in the New Yorker Herold to promote handball.

On 28 October 1926 the first field handball game was played between the Turnverein Union City and the First German Sport Club of Brooklyn. The game ended in a 9 to 9 draw. Newark TV joined the other two and they played some friendly games.

In 1927 the German American Athletic Union (GAAU) started to sponsor field handball. The first handball chairman was Gustav Ricke from First German Sport Club of Brooklyn. In the season 1927-28 only friendly games were played.

== Professional leagues ==
In 1978, the National Teamball League was formed with six clubs: the Detroit Hawks, Chicago Chiefs, Boston Comets, New York Stags, Philadelphia Warriors and Pittsburgh Points. The NTL (described as an "Americanized" version of team handball, with faster play and higher scores) was bankrolled by Aben Johnson Jr., owner of WXON-TV in Detroit, and WXON aired the league's first game, a 48–26 victory by Detroit over Chicago. The match, played in front of about 800 people at Macomb County Community College in Warren, Michigan, was taped in early December and aired on WXON on Friday, December 8, 1978, and again the next day.

The Hawks-Chiefs matchup was the only NTL match known to have been televised; in fact, it was one of the few known to have been played, as press coverage of the loop was almost nonexistent. A local Boston-area newspaper, the Charlestown Patriot and Somerville Chronicle, covered at least one of their matches, as the Comets played at Medford Street Gym in Charlestown, Massachusetts with several local players. After a win over Detroit (the Hawks' first loss of the season) on February 3, 1979, the Comets record was reported as 4–0, including two victories over Philadelphia in December. Whether the league's first season (scheduled to run through April 1979) was completed is unknown; most likely, the NTL died quickly and disappeared. ("National Teamball League, Inc." was incorporated by Johnson in August 1978 and dissolved in March 1980.)

In 2020, former USA Team Handball CEO Barry Siff stated that plans were in development to create an American professional team handball league. The new, unnamed league's launch is scheduled for 2023, with 10 teams initially worth three to five million dollars apiece. There are also plans to cooperate with NBA or NHL owners in one-tenant arena situations, and perhaps create multisports clubs like FC Barcelona or Paris Saint-Germain.

Season	League	Cup	Teams
1929	Not held	German Sport Club of Elizabeth	7 teams: First German Sport Club of Brooklyn (2 teams); Turnverein Hoboken; Newark TV; Kolping; German Sport Club of Elizabeth; First German Sport Club of New York
1929-30	First German Sport Club of Brooklyn	First German Sport Club of Brooklyn	?
1930-31	Newark TV	?	13 teams: New York (7 teams); Philadelphia (6 teams)
1931-32	Newark TV	?	?
1932-33	Not held	?	?
1933-34	First German Sport Club of Brooklyn	?	?
1934-35	Newark TV	?	?
1935-36	Cake Baker's Sport Club	?	?
1936-37	?	?	?
1937-38	Cake Baker's Sport Club	?	?

Because handball was part of the 1936 Summer Olympics the Amateur Athletic Union (AAU) started to sponsor field handball in 1934. Many of the handball leaders of the DAAV were chosen to lead the handball committee of the AAU.

In 1942 the Office of Alien Property Custodian seized all records of the German American Athletic Union.

After World War II, handball had no national body until 1959 as the United States Team Handball Federation was founded. In the same year, the United States Handball Federation League was founded. The Elizabeth S.C. won at least all season until 1967. In 1962, nine teams from New York and New Jersey played in the league as a winter conditioner for soccer. In 1963, 20 teams with 200 players competed in handball.

== Middle school ==
=== San Francisco Bay Area ===
The Youth Team Handball Middle School League and Youth California Cup organized by San Francisco CalHeat THC are the only competitions accommodating middle school in the USA.

Year	Boys		Girls	
Year	League	Cup	League	Cup
2017	Stanbridge	Lycée Français	No league or Cup for the Girls	
2018	Bret Harte	Bret Harte	No league or Cup for the Girls	
2019	Bret Harte	Castillero	No league or Cup for the Girls	
2020	No championship due to the COVID-19 pandemic			
2021	Bret Harte	Bret Harte	–	Bret Harte
2022	Bret Harte		Bret Harte	Bret Harte

Current members of the Youth Team Handball Middle School League:

- Bret Harte Middle School (Boys & Girls)
- Castillero Middle School (Boys & Girls)
- Stanbridge Academy
- Sterne School
- John Muir Middle School

Past members of the Youth Team Handball Middle School League:

- Lycée Français de San Francisco
- San Francisco CalHeat THC

== High school ==
=== San Francisco Bay Area ===
The Youth Team Handball High School League and Youth California Cup organized by San Francisco CalHeat THC are the high school competitions in the SF Bay Area.

Year	League	Cup
2016	Sterne	Sterne
2017	Sterne	Sterne
2018	Lycée Français	Lycée Français ^{1}
2019	Leland	Leland
2020	No championship due to the COVID-19 pandemic	
2021	Cali Kings Handball	Cali Kings Handball
2022	Pioneer	

^{1} Youth Cup was cancelled due to bad air quality because of the 2018 Camp Fire. Lycée Français got the title because of their regular season record.

Current members of the Youth Team Handball High School League:

- Cali Kings Handball
- Pioneer High School
- SF CalHeat
- Sterne School

Past members of the Youth Team Handball High School League:

- Bayhill High School
- Leland High School
- Compass High School
- Lycée Français de San Francisco

=== Montgomery County, Maryland ===
The MCPS Athletics offers team handball as corollary sports.

Season	County	Division
2012-13	none	Clarksburg (West); Blair (East)
2013-14	Margruder	Magrunder (West); Blair (South)
2014-15	Blair	Wootton (South); Sherwood (East)
2015-16	Wootton	Sherwood (D-1); Wootton (D-2)
2016-17	Blair	Sherwood (D-1); Blair (D-2)
2017-18	Wootton	Sherwood (D-1); Wootton (D-2)
2018-19	Walt Whitman	Sherwood (D-1); Blair (D-2)
2019-20	Blair	Clarksburg (D-1); Sherwood (D-2)
2020–21	No championship due to Covid	
2021-22	Walt Whitman	Walt Whitman (D-1)
2022–23	Wootton	Single Division

Current members of the MCPS handball:

- Clarksburg High School
- Sherwood High School
- Thomas Sprigg Wootton High School
- Montgomery Blair High School
- Walt Whitman High School

Former members of the MCPS handball:

- Watkins Mill High School
- Colonel Zadok A. Magruder High School
- Northwest High School
- Seneca Valley High School
- Bethesda-Chevy Chase High School
- Walter Johnson High School

== See also ==
- United States men's national handball team
- United States women's national handball team
