= North American and Caribbean Senior Club Championship =

- Founded: 2019
- No. of teams: 7
- Country: North American and Caribbean
- Confederation: North America and Caribbean; Handball Confederation (NACHC)
- Most recent champion: (United States) Los Angeles THC (2026)
- Most titles: (United States) San Francisco CalHeat & (United States) California Eagles (2 titles)
- Feeder to: IHF Men's Super Globe
- 2026

The North American and Caribbean Senior Club Championship, organized by the North America and Caribbean Handball Confederation, is the official competition for men's handball clubs of North America and Caribbean, and takes place every year. In addition to crowning the NorCa champions, the tournament also serves as a qualifying tournament for the IHF Men's Super Globe.

== History ==
With the split of the Pan-American Team Handball Federation (PATHF) in 2019 into the North America and Caribbean Handball Confederation (NACHC) and South and Central America Handball Confederation(SCAHC) the Pan American Men's Club Handball Championship was folded. As result the North American and Caribbean Senior Club Championship and the South and Central American Men's Club Handball Championship were created for the qualification for the IHF Men's Super Globe. The first edition was held in Lake Placid, New York, in 2019 with 3 teams. The first edition was won by New York City THC.

The third edition was won by San Francisco CalHeat.

== Summary ==
Year	Host	Final			Third place match			Teams
Year	Host	Champion	Score	Runner-up	Third place	Score	Fourth place	Teams
2019; Details	(United States); Lake Placid	(United States); New York City THC	No playoffs	(Canada); Handball Québec	(United States); Los Angeles THC	–	–	3
2020; Details	(United States); Lake Placid	Cancelled due to the COVID-19 pandemic						
2021; Details	(United States); Fremont	(United States); San Francisco CalHeat	No playoffs	(Mexico); Club Ministros	(United States); New York City THC	–	–	3
2022; Details	(Mexico); Monterrey	(Mexico); Club Ministros	23 – 22	(Mexico); Vikingos de Sonora	(United States); San Francisco CalHeat	32 – 27	(Puerto Rico); Los Guerrilleros	6
2023; Details	(Puerto Rico); San Juan	(United States); San Francisco CalHeat	33–27	(Puerto Rico); Caciques de Palmer	(Puerto Rico); Los Guerrilleros	42–31	(Mexico); Krakens Handball Club	4
2024; Details	(United States); Newark, New Jersey	(United States); California Eagles	24 – 21	(United States); New York City THC	(United States); Los Angeles THC	50 – 49 (PS)	(Mexico); Krakens Handball Club	4
2025; Details	(United States); Las Vegas, Nevada	(United States); California Eagles	37 – 31	(Greenland); GSS Nuuk	(United States); Los Angeles THC	36 – 27	(Canada); Club de Handball de Lévis	7
2026; Details	Queretaro, Mexico	(United States); Los Angeles THC	34 – 29	(United States); New York Athletic Club	(Mexico); Juventus	30 – 27	(Mexico); Espartano	4

== Medal table ==
=== Per Club ===
Rank	Club	Gold	Silver	Bronze	Total
1	(United States) San Francisco CalHeat	2	0	1	3
2	(United States) California Eagles	2	0	0	2
3	(United States) New York City THC	1	1	1	3
4	(Mexico) Club Ministros	1	1	0	2
5	(United States) Los Angeles THC	1	0	3	4
6	(Puerto Rico) Caciques de Palmer	0	1	0	1
6	(Greenland) GSS Nuuk	0	1	0	1
6	(Canada) Handball Québec	0	1	0	1
6	(United States) New York Athletic Club	0	1	0	1
6	(Mexico) Vikingos de Sonora	0	1	0	1
11	(Mexico) Juventus	0	0	1	1
11	(Puerto Rico) Los Guerrilleros	0	0	1	1
Totals (12 entries)		7	7	7	21

=== Per Nation ===
Rank	Nation	Gold	Silver	Bronze	Total
1	United States (USA)	6	2	5	13
2	Mexico (MEX)	1	2	1	4
3	Puerto Rico (PUR)	0	1	1	2
4	Canada (CAN)	0	1	0	1
4	Greenland (GRL)	0	1	0	1
Totals (5 entries)		7	7	7	21
