= Moccia =

Moccia (pronounced [ˈmɔttʃa]) is a southern Italian surname. Notable people with the surname include:

- Moccia clan, a Camorra clan from Naples, Italy
- Carola Moccia (born 1991), known as La Niña, Italian singer-songwriter and actress
- Federico Moccia (born 1963), Italian writer, screenwriter and film director, son of Giuseppe
- Giuseppe Moccia (1933–2006), Italian screenwriter and film director
- Mario Moccia (born 1967), American athletic director
- Richard A. Moccia (born 1943), mayor of Norwalk, Connecticut (2005–2013)
- Rocío Sánchez Moccia (born 1988), Argentine field hockey player
- Salvatore Moccia (born 2005), known as Petit, Italian singer-songwriter

== See also ==
- Mocci
- Moccio
