= 2021 North American and Caribbean Senior Club Championship =

Tournament details
- Host country: United States
- Venue: 1 (in 1 host city)
- Dates: 2021
- Teams: 3 (from 1 confederation)

Final positions
- Champions: (United States) San Francisco CalHeat
- Runners-up: (Mexico) Club Ministros
- Third place: (United States) New York City THC

Tournament statistics
- Matches played: 3
- Goals scored: 169 (56.33 per match)
- Attendance: 0 (0 per match)
- Top scorers: (Spain) Eloy Rubio (18 goals) (United States) San Francisco CalHeat

The 2021 North American and Caribbean Senior Club Championship was the second edition of the North American and Caribbean Senior Club Championship which is a qualifying tournament for the 2021 IHF Men's Super Globe. It was held in Fremont, United States at the Centerville Junior High School from 25 to 27 August 2021.

== Venue ==
The championship was played in Fremont, at the Ray Gehrke Court.

| Fremont | 2021 North American and Caribbean Senior Club Championship is located in the United States |
|---|---|
| Ray Gehrke Court; Capacity: 1,000 | 2021 North American and Caribbean Senior Club Championship is located in the United States |

== Teams ==
Locations of the 2020 North American and the Caribbean Senior Club Championship teams

Following teams were already qualified for the tournament. The invitation letter was written only a month before the competition.

| Team | Qualified as |
|---|---|
| (United States) San Francisco CalHeat | Winner of USA Team Handball Nationals 2019 |
| (United States) New York City THC | Runner up of USA Team Handball Nationals 2019 |
| (Mexico) Club Ministros de Monterrey | Winner of Mexican Senior Men's Champion 2021 |

== Referees ==
Referees
| Mexico | Brian Belmonte Enei; Erick Belmonte Enei |

== Results ==
| Pos | Team | Pld | W | D | L | GF | GA | GD | Pts | Qualification |
|---|---|---|---|---|---|---|---|---|---|---|
| 1 | (United States) San Francisco CalHeat (H) | 2 | 2 | 0 | 0 | 60 | 48 | +12 | 4 | 2021 IHF Men's Super Globe |
| 2 | (Mexico) Club Ministros | 2 | 1 | 0 | 1 | 58 | 61 | −3 | 2 | |
| 3 | (United States) New York City THC | 2 | 0 | 0 | 2 | 51 | 60 | −9 | 0 | |

Source: Super Globe 2021
Rules for classification: 1) points; 2) points in the games between teams in question; 3) goal difference in the games between teams in question; 4) number of goals scored in the games between teams in question; 5) goal difference; 6) number of goals scored.
(H) Hosts

All times are local (UTC-7).

| 25 August 2021; 19:30 | Club Ministros (Mexico) | 27-31 | (United States) San Francisco CalHeat | Ray Gehrke Court, Fremont; Attendance: 0 Referees: Belmonte, Belmonte (MEX) |
| 25 August 2021; 19:30 | Muñiz 11 | (13-15) | Rubio 10 | Ray Gehrke Court, Fremont; Attendance: 0 Referees: Belmonte, Belmonte (MEX) |
| 25 August 2021; 19:30 | 1× (yellow card) 4× (suspension) | Report | 1× (yellow card) 9× (suspension) 1× (red card) | Ray Gehrke Court, Fremont; Attendance: 0 Referees: Belmonte, Belmonte (MEX) |

| 26 August 2021; 19:30 | San Francisco CalHeat (United States) | 29-21 | (United States) New York City THC | Ray Gehrke Court, Fremont; Attendance: 0 Referees: Belmonte, Belmonte (MEX) |
| 26 August 2021; 19:30 | Rubio, Skogsholm 8 | (13-10) | Nothias 5 | Ray Gehrke Court, Fremont; Attendance: 0 Referees: Belmonte, Belmonte (MEX) |
| 26 August 2021; 19:30 | 1× (yellow card) 6× (suspension) 1× (red card) | Report | 6× (suspension) | Ray Gehrke Court, Fremont; Attendance: 0 Referees: Belmonte, Belmonte (MEX) |

| 27 August 2021; 19:30 | New York City THC (United States) | 30-31 | (Mexico) Club Ministros | Ray Gehrke Court, Fremont; Attendance: 0 Referees: Belmonte, Belmonte (MEX) |
| 27 August 2021; 19:30 | De Lima 6 | (14-17) | Muñiz Gonzalez 6 | Ray Gehrke Court, Fremont; Attendance: 0 Referees: Belmonte, Belmonte (MEX) |
| 27 August 2021; 19:30 | 1× (yellow card) 7× (suspension) 1× (red card) | Report | 1× (yellow card) 4× (suspension) | Ray Gehrke Court, Fremont; Attendance: 0 Referees: Belmonte, Belmonte (MEX) |

== Statistics ==
=== Team ===
| # | Team | Penalty card | | Handball | | Penalty card | | Penalty card | |
| # | Team | Σ | ⌀ | Σ | ⌀ | Σ | ⌀ | Σ | ⌀ |
|---|---|---|---|---|---|---|---|---|---|
| 1. | San Francisco CalHeat | 1 | 0.5 | 15 | 7.5 | 1 | 0.5 | 0 | 0.0 |
| 2. | New York City THC | 1 | 0.5 | 13 | 6.5 | 1 | 0.5 | 0 | 0.0 |
| 3. | Club Ministros | 2 | 1.0 | 8 | 4.0 | 0 | 0.0 | 0 | 0.0 |
| Total: | | 4 | 1.3 | 36 | 12 | 2 | 0.7 | 0 | 0.0 |

=== Top Scorers ===
| # | Player | Team | G | ⌀ |
|---|---|---|---|---|
| 1. | (Spain) Eloy Rubio | San Francisco CalHeat | 18 | 9.0 |
| 2. | (Mexico) Francisco Muñiz Gomez | Club Ministros | 17 | 8.5 |
| 3. | (Norway) Theodor Skogsholm | San Francisco CalHeat | 13 | 6.5 |
| 4. | (Mexico) Luis Antonio Avalos Tamez | Club Ministros | 12 | 6.0 |
| 5. | (Switzerland) Luca Engler | San Francisco CalHeat | 11 | 5.5 |
| 6. | (Poland) Paweł Świeca | New York City THC | 9 | 4.5 |
| 7. | (Mexico) Leonardo Daniel Ayala González | Club Ministros | 8 | 4.0 |
| 7. | (Cameroon) Zuwed Akuro | San Francisco CalHeat | 8 | 4.0 |
| 9. | (United States) Togba Aboubacar | New York City THC | 7 | 3.5 |
| 9. | (Brazil) Lucas De Lima | New York City THC | 7 | 3.5 |
