= Peter Buehning Jr. =

American handball player

Personal information
- Full name: Peter Paul Buehning Jr.
- Born: April 29, 1954 (age 72) United States

Sport
- Sport: Handball

Peter Paul Buehning Jr. (born April 29, 1954) is an American former handball player who competed in the 1976 Summer Olympics.

He was born in Boston and is the older brother of James Buehning, as well as the son of Peter Buehning Sr.

In 1976 he was part of the American team which finished tenth in the Olympic tournament. He played three matches and scored one goal.
