= 2018–19 USA Team Handball rankings =

- Season: 2018–19

Preseason #1
- Men's: New York Athletic Club
- Women's: Rogue
- College: West Point Black

End of season champions

Leagues with most teams in final poll

This is the second season a team handball ranking for the women's clubs and the men's college exist and the third for men's clubs.

== Legend ==
	Increase in ranking
	Decrease in ranking
	New to rankings from previous week
Italics	Number of first place votes
(#–#-#)	Win-tie-loss record
т	Tied with team above or below also with this symbol
(V)	Varsity teams
NR	Not ranked but receiving votes

== Men's Top 25 ==
	Month 1 Nov 18	Month 2 Jan 1	Month 3 Feb 4	Month 4 Mar	Month 5 Apr	Month 6 May	
1.	San Francisco CalHeat (5-0-0) (2)	San Francisco CalHeat (9-0-1) (4)	San Francisco CalHeat (14-0-1) (5)				1.
2.	New York Athletic Club (8-0-1) (1)	New York City (2-0-0) (4)	New York City (4-0-2) (1)				2.
3.	Chicago Inter (9-0-3)	New York Athletic Club (8-0-1)	New York Athletic Club (8-0-1) (1)				3.
4.	Team Handball Academy (8-0-4)	Chicago Inter (12-0-4)	Chicago Inter (15-0-5)				4.
5.	New York City (0-0-0) (4)	Boston (7-1-2)	Los Angeles (3-0-1)				5.
6.	West Point Black (V) (7–1-5)	West Point Black (V) (7–1-7)	Boston (8-1-2)				6.
7.	Boston (4-1-2)	Carolina Blue (4-0-1)	West Point Black (V) (9–1-9)				7.
8.	Carolina Blue (4-0-1)	Team Handball Academy (8-0-4)	Houston Firehawks (6-0-8)				8.
9.	Houston Firehawks (2-0-3)	Houston Firehawks (5-0-5)	Carolina Blue (4-0-1)				9.
10.	UVA Alumni (4-0-1)	Georgia (5-0-1)	Georgia (5-0-1)				10.
11.	DC Diplomats (1-0-2)	UVA Alumni (4-0-1)	DC Diplomats (3-0-3)				11.
12.	Georgia (5-0-1)	Air Force (V) (2-0-3)	UVA Alumni (4-0-1)				12.
13.	Handball Club Toronto (CAN) (2-0-3)	DC Diplomats (3-0-3)	Uni. of North Carolina (V) (8-0-6)				13.
14.	Uni. of North Carolina (V) (8-0-6)	Los Angeles (0-0-0)	Long Island Tigers (7-0-8)				14.
15.	Long Island Tigers (5-0-6)	Columbus Armada-Nina (4-0-1)	Handball Club Toronto (CAN) (2-0-3)				15.
16.	James Madison (V) (2-0-1)	Handball Club Toronto (CAN) (2-0-3)	Team Handball Academy (8-0-4)				16.
17.	West Point Gold (V) (0–0-6)	West Virginia (V) (2-0-0)	Columbus Armada-Nina (4-0-1) т				17.
18.	Dallas (0-0-0)	Ohio State Scarlet (V) (5-0-2) т	New York City 2 (0-0-2) т				18.
19.	Boston 2 (2-0-0)	Long Island Tigers (7-0-6) т	San Francisco CalHeat II (1-0-3)				19.
20.	Columbus Armada-Pinta (5-0-3)	New York City 2 (0-0-2)	Ohio State Scarlet (V) (5-0-2)				20.
21.	Ohio State Scarlet (V) (5-0-2)	Texas A&M University (V) (2-0-2) т	West Virginia (V) (3-1-0)				21.
22.	Los Angeles (0-0-0)	West Point Gold (V) (0-0-8) т	Air Force (V) (2-0-7)				22.
23.	Alberta Jrs (CAN) (3-0-3)	San Francisco CalHeat II (0-0-0)	Columbus Armada-Pinta (6-0-3)				23.
24.	Minnesota (3-0-5)	Minnesota (3-0-5) т	Minnesota (3-0-5) т				24.
25.	Knight Air (0-0-0)	Dallas (1-0-4) т	Boston 2 (4-0-1) т				25.
	Month 1 Nov 18	Month 2 Jan 1	Month 3 Feb 4	Month 4 Mar	Month 5 Apr	Month 6 May	
NR	Air Force (V) (0-0-1)	Uni. of North Carolina (V) (8-0-6)	Dallas (1-0-4)				NR
NR	West Virginia (V) (2-0-0)	Boston 2 (3-0-1)	West Point Gold (V) (0-0-8)				NR
NR	New York City 2 (0-0-0)	Milwaukee United (0-0-0)					NR
NR	Blue Heat (1-0-4)	Columbus Armada-Pinta (5-0-3)					NR
NR	San Francisco CalHeat II (0-0-0)	James Madison (V) (2-0-1)	James Madison (V) (3-0-2)				NR
NR	Ohio State Gray (V) (1-1-7)	Alberta Jrs (CAN) (3-0-3)	Alberta Jrs (CAN) (3-0-3)				NR
NR	Columbus Armada-Nina (4-0-1)						NR
NR	University of Virginia (V) (2-0-3)	University of Virginia (2-0-3)	University of Virginia (4-0-3)				NR
NR	Penn State (V) (1-0-1)	Penn State (V) (1-0-1)	Penn State (V) (1-0-1)				NR
NR	University of Cincinnati (V) (1-0-3)						NR
NR	Concordia College (V) (0-0-3)						NR
NR	Seattle (0-0-0)						NR
NR	Texas A&M University (V) (0-0-0)		Texas A&M University (V) (2-0-2)				NR
NR	New York City 3 (0-0-2)	New York City 3 (0-0-4)	New York City 3 (0-0-4)				NR
NR	UNC Tar Heels (V) (0-1-4)						NR
NR	DC Ambassadors (0-0-0)						NR
NR	Vancouver (0-0-0)						NR
	Month 1 Nov 18	Month 2 Jan 1	Month 3 Feb 4	Month 4 Mar	Month 5 Apr	Month 6 May	
		Dropped: Knight Air (0-0-0); Blue Heat (1-0-4); Ohio State Gray (V) (1-1-7); University of Cincinnati (V) (1-0-3); Concordia College (V) (0-0-3); Seattle (0-0-0); UNC Tar Heels (V) (0-1-4); DC Ambassadors (0-0-0); Vancouver (0-0-0)	Dropped: Milwaukee United (0-0-0)	Dropped:	Dropped:	Dropped:	

Source for missing records:

== Women's Top 5 ==
	Month 1 Nov 18	Month 2 Jan 1	Month 3 Feb 4	Month 4 Mar 4	Month 5 Apr 13	
1.	Rogue (5–0-0) (6)	Rogue (5–0-0) (6)	Rogue (5–0-0) (7)	Rogue (5–0-0) (7)	Rogue (5–0-0) (7)	1.
2.	New York City (0-0-0)	Boston (8–0-0)	New York City (5-0-0)	New York City (6-1-0)	New York City (14-1-0)	2.
3.	Boston (6–0-0)	New York City (1-0-0)	Boston (8–0-0)	Boston (12–0-2)	Boston (12–0-2)	3.
4.	DC Diplomats (2-0–0)	Chicago Inter (3-0-2)	Chicago Inter (3-0-2)	DC Diplomats (3-0–4)	Chicago Inter (3-0-2)	4.
5.	Chicago Inter (3-0-2)	DC Diplomats (2-0–2)	DC Diplomats (2-0–2)	Chicago Inter (3-0-2)	DC Diplomats (5-0–5) т	5.
5.	Chicago Inter (3-0-2)	DC Diplomats (2-0–2)	DC Diplomats (2-0–2)	Chicago Inter (3-0-2)	West Point Black (V) (12-1-5) т	5.
	Month 1 Nov 18	Month 2 Jan 1	Month 3 Feb 4	Month 4 Mar 4	Month 5 Apr 13	
NR	Uni. of North Carolina (V) (6-0-6)	West Point Black (V) (10-0-4)	West Point Black (V) (10-0-4)	West Point Black (V) (10-1-5)		NR
NR	Uni. of North Carolina (V) (6-0-6)	Houston Firehawks (3-1-8)	San Francisco CalHeat (6-1-7)	San Francisco CalHeat (6-1-7)	San Francisco CalHeat (6-1-7)	NR
	Month 1 Nov 18	Month 2 Jan 1	Month 3 Feb 4	Month 4 Mar 4	Month 5 Apr 13	
		Dropped: Uni. of North Carolina (V) (6-0-6)	Dropped: Houston Firehawks (3-1-12)	None	None	

== Collegiate Top 5 ==
The record at the college ranking is only against other college teams.

	Month 1 Nov 18	Month 2 Jan 1	Month 3 Feb 13	Month 4 Mar 20	Month 5 Apr 19	
1.	West Point Black (3–0-0) (7)	West Point Black (3-0-0) (7)	West Point Black (3-0-0) (6)	West Point Black (6-0-0) (7)	West Point Black (6-0-0) (7)	1.
2.	North Carolina (5-0-1)	North Carolina (5-0-1)	North Carolina (5-0-1) (1)	North Carolina (7-0-1)	West Virginia (6-1-0)	2.
3.	Air Force (0–0-1)	West Virginia (2-0-0)	Ohio State Scarlet (4-0-2)	Ohio State Scarlet (5-0-3)	North Carolina (12-0-2)	3.
4.	West Virginia (2-0–0)	Air Force (1-0-1)	West Virginia (3-0-0)	West Virginia (3-0-0)	Virginia (5-1–0)	4.
5.	Ohio State Scarlet (4-0-2)	Ohio State Scarlet (4-0-2)	Virginia (3-1–0)	Air Force (2-0-1)	Ohio State Scarlet 5-0-3)	5.
	Month 1 Nov 18	Month 2 Jan 1	Month 3 Feb 13	Month 4 Mar 20	Month 5 Apr 19	
NR	Penn State (0-0-1)	Texas A&M (0-0-1)	Air Force (1-0-1)	West Point Gold (2-0-3)	Penn State (2-0-1)	NR
NR	Virginia (2-0–0)	Virginia (2-0–0)		Virginia (3-1–0)	Air Force (2-0-1)	NR
NR	James Madison (1-0-1)	Aubrun (0-2-0)	James Madison (2-0-1)	James Madison (3-0-2)		NR
NR				Illinois (2-1–1)		NR
	Month 1 Nov 18	Month 2 Jan 1	Month 3 Feb 13	Month 4 Mar 20	Month 5 Apr 19	
		Dropped: Penn State (0-0-1); James Madison (1-0-1)	Dropped: Texas A&M (0-0-1); Aubrun (0-2-0)	None	Dropped: West Point Gold (2-0-3); James Madison (4-0-5); Illinois (2-1–1)	
