= South American Women's Club Handball Championship =

- Founded: 1984
- No. of teams: 4 - 7
- Country: PATHF South American members
- Confederation: PATHF (America)
- Most recent champions: (Brazil) Universidade Luterana do Brasil (2nd title)
- Most titles: (Brazil) Incolustre Cambé, (Brazil) Clube Esportivo Mauá & (Brazil) Universidade Luterana do Brasil (2 titles)
- Level on pyramid: 1

The South American Women's Club Handball Championship, organized by the Pan-American Team Handball Federation, was the official competition for men's handball clubs of South Americas, and takes place every year. In 2003 or 2004 it was folded because of the dominance of the Brazilian teams. In 2016 the Pan American Women's Club Handball Championship was created.

== Summary ==
Year	Host	Final			Third place match			Teams
Year	Host	Champion	Score	Runner-up	Third place	Score	Fourth place	Teams
I (1984); Details	(Argentina); Buenos Aires	(Paraguay); Talleres		(Argentina); Club Atlético River Plate	(Argentina); Instituto Nacional de Educación Física		(Uruguay); Scuola Italiana di Montevideo	4
II (1985); Details	(Brazil); Cambé	(Brazil); Incolustre Cambé		(Brazil); Iate Clube de Aracajú	(Paraguay); Talleres		(Paraguay); Club Cerro Porteño	6
III (1986); Details	(Paraguay); Asunción	(Brazil); Incolustre Cambé						4
IV (1987); Details	(Brazil); Campo Mourão	(Brazil); ASM Campo Mourão		(Brazil); AFM Cambé	(Argentina); Club Atlético River Plate		(Uruguay); Scuola Italiana di Montevideo	5
1988-92	There is no information to confirm that these tournaments took place.							
V (1993); Details	(Brazil); São Gonçalo dos Campos	(Brazil); Clube Esportivo Mauá		(Brazil); Associação Atlética Guarú	(Paraguay); La Emiliana		(Argentina); Club Ferro Carril Oeste	6
VI (1994); Details	(Brazil); São Gonçalo dos Campos	(Brazil); Clube Esportivo Mauá		(Brazil); Associação Esportiva Giorama	(Argentina); Club Ferro Carril Oeste		(Paraguay); Club Fomento Barrio Obrero	6
1995	There is no information to confirm that this tournament took place.							
1996	Suspended due to lack of confirmation of the teams. In the suspension announcement, Brazil mention it should be the VIII competition. According to that, between 1988 and 1995 three tournaments were played, but there are only confirmations for the 1993 and 1994 editions.							
1997	Suspended.							
? (1998); Details	(Paraguay); Asunción	(Brazil) Universidade Luterana do Brasil		(Brazil); Clube Esportivo Mauá	(Argentina); Instituto Nuestra Señora de Luján			5
? (1999); Details	(Brazil); São Gonçalo, Rio de Janeiro	(Brazil) Universidade Luterana do Brasil		(Brazil); Associacao Atlética Guarú / Super Agua	(Brazil); Clube Esportivo Mauá		(Brazil); Movimiento Expansión Social Católica	7
2000	Suspended due to the lack of host.							
2001	Suspended.							
2002	Suspended because of an overloaded calendar.							

== Medal table ==
Locations of the South American Men's Club Handball Championship winners

=== Per Club ===
Rank	Club	Gold	Silver	Bronze	Total
1	(Brazil) Clube Esportivo Mauá	2	1	1	4
2	(Brazil) Incolustre Cambé	2	0	0	2
2	(Brazil) Universidade Luterana do Brasil	2	0	0	2
4	(Paraguay) Talleres	1	0	1	2
5	(Brazil) ASM Campo Mourão	1	0	0	1
6	(Brazil) Associacao Atlética Guarú	0	2	0	2
7	(Argentina) Club Atlético River Plate	0	1	1	2
8	(Brazil) AFM Cambé	0	1	0	1
8	(Brazil) Associação Esportiva Giorama	0	1	0	1
8	(Brazil) Iate Clube de Aracajú	0	1	0	1
11	(Argentina) Club Ferro Carril Oeste	0	0	1	1
11	(Argentina) Instituto Nacional de Educación Física	0	0	1	1
11	(Argentina) Instituto Nuestra Señora de Luján	0	0	1	1
11	(Paraguay) La Emiliana	0	0	1	1
Totals (14 entries)		8	7	7	22

=== Per Nation ===
Rank	Nation	Gold	Silver	Bronze	Total
1	Brazil	7	6	1	14
2	Paraguay	1	0	2	3
3	Argentina	0	1	4	5
Totals (3 entries)		8	7	7	22
