= 2020 North American and Caribbean Senior Club Championship =

Tournament details
- Host country: United States
- Venue(s): 1 (in 1 host city)
- Dates: 16–20 June

The 2020 North American and Caribbean Senior Club Championship were planned as the second edition of the North American and Caribbean Senior Club Championship which is a qualifying tournament for the 2020 IHF Super Globe. It was supposed to be held in Lake Placid, United States at the United States Olympic Training Center from 16 to 20 June 2020.

Due to COVID-19 the tournament was cancelled.

== Venue ==
The championship would have been played in Lake Placid, at the United States Olympic Training Center (LPOTC).

| Lake Placid | 2020 North American and Caribbean Senior Club Championship is located in the United States |
|---|---|
| United States Olympic Training Center; Capacity: 1,000 | 2020 North American and Caribbean Senior Club Championship is located in the United States |

== Teams ==
Locations of the 2020 North American and Caribbean Senior Club Championship teams

Following teams were already qualified for the tournament.

| Team | Qualified as |
|---|---|
| (United States) San Francisco CalHeat | Winner of USA Team Handball Nationals 2019 |
| (United States) New York City THC | Runner up of USA Team Handball Nationals 2019 |
| (Canada) Club de Handball Celtique de Montréal | Winner of Canadian Senior Men's Champion |
| (Canada) Club de Handball de Lévis | Runner up of Canadian Senior Men's Champion |
