= Club Ministros =

Mexican handball team

- Founded: 1998
- Arena: Monterrey
Home	Away

The Club Ministros is a handball team from Monterrey, Mexico. They participated as first Mexican team at the IHF Men's Super Globe in 2022.

== Records ==
=== Men ===
- IHF Super Globe (World Club Championship)

Qualified - 2022
Best Finish - 12th 2022

- North American and Caribbean Senior Club Championship - 1 title

Winners - 2022
Runner-up- 2021

- Mexican Men's Handball Champion - 1 title

Winners - 2020
Runner-up- 2022
