= Martin Branick =

Danish sports executive

- Born: Martin Branick; 1993 (age 32–33); Denmark
- Education: Kennesaw State University (B.B.A Management 2016), Georgia State University (M.S. Sport Administration 2022)
- Occupation: sports executive
- Years active: 2016–present
- Employer: USA Team Handball
- Title: Chief Executive Officer
- Term: 2023–present

Martin Branick (born in 1993) is a Danish sport executive and the chief executive officer of the USA Team Handball. Branick was appointed as USATH event and membership development coordinator in 2021, having previously served as digital development and partnership services manager for Danish football club Vejle Boldklub from 2017 to 2021. Branick was named the permanent CEO of USA Team Handball in July 2023 at the age of 29 as one of the youngest ever to be named the CEO of a United States sports governing body.

A native of Denmark, Branick grew up playing handball and started a collegiate handball club at Kennesaw State University in 2012 while competing at the senior level with Georgia Handball Club. He is a certified Indoor and beach handball referee.

In January 2025, Branick was named to Kennesaw State University’s inaugural 40 Owls under 40 class.
