= 2014 Pan American Women's 7x7 Wheelchair Handball Championship =

2014 Pan American Women's 7x7 Wheelchair HandballChampionship
Tournament details
- Host country: Argentina
- City: Buenos Aires
- Venue(s): 1 (in 1 host city)
- Dates: 12–13 December
- Teams: 3 (from PTHF confederations)

Final positions
- Champions: Brazil (1st title)
- Runners-up: Chile
- Third place: Argentina

Tournament statistics
- Matches played: 4
- Goals scored: 85 (21.25 per match)

The 2014 Pan American Women's 7x7 Wheelchair Handball Championship was the first edition and was hosted for the first time in Argentina from 17 to 20 September 2014.

== Preliminary round ==
All times are local (UTC-3)

Pos	Team	Pld	W	D	L	GF	GA	GD	Pts	Qualification
1	Brazil	2	2	0	0	35	9	+26	4	Final
2	Chile	2	1	0	1	17	21	−4	2	Final
3	Argentina	2	0	0	2	11	33	−22	0	Bronze medal

Source: EHF

17 September 2014; 14:00	Brazil	13–6	Chile	Sociedad Alemana De Gimnasia de Almirante Brown, Buenos Aires

18 September 2014; 15:40	Brazil	22–3	Argentina	Sociedad Alemana De Gimnasia de Almirante Brown, Buenos Aires

19 September 2014; 14:00	Chile	11–8	Argentina	Sociedad Alemana De Gimnasia de Almirante Brown, Buenos Aires

== Final ==
20 September 2014; 9:04	Chile	7–15	Brazil	Polideportivo Municipal Almirante Brown, Buenos Aires

== Ranking and statistics ==
=== Final ranking ===
Rank	Team
1st place, gold medalist(s)	Brazil
2nd place, silver medalist(s)	Chile
3rd place, bronze medalist(s)	Argentina
