= South American Men's Club Handball Championship =

- Founded: 1983
- No. of teams: 4 - 8
- Country: PATHF South American members
- Confederation: PATHF (America)
- Most recent champions: (Brazil) Methodist University of São Paulo (5th title)
- Most titles: (Brazil) Methodist University of São Paulo (5 titles)
- Level on pyramid: 1

The South American Men's Club Handball Championship, organized by the Pan-American Team Handball Federation, was the official competition for men's handball clubs of South Americas, and takes place every year. In addition to crowning the Pan American champions, the tournament also served as a qualifying tournament for the IHF Super Globe. In 2003 or 2004 it was folded because of the dominance of the Brazilian teams. In 2007 the Pan American Men's Club Handball Championship was created.

== Summary ==
Year	Host	Final			Third place match			Teams
Year	Host	Champion	Score	Runner-up	Third place	Score	Fourth place	Teams
I (1983); Details	(Argentina); El Palomar	(Argentina); SAG Villa Ballester		(Brazil); Federal University of Santa Maria	(Argentina); Asociación de Fomento Amigos Lomas del Palomar - AFALP		(Paraguay); Club Don Bosco Handball	5
II (1984); Details	(Argentina); Buenos Aires	(Argentina); Club Atlético River Plate		(Brazil); Federal University of Santa Maria	(Argentina); SAG Villa Ballester		(Paraguay); Club Don Bosco Handball	6
III (1985); Details	(Brazil); Santa María	(Brazil); Federal University of Santa Maria		(Brazil); Clube Olímpico de Maringá	(Argentina); Club Atlético River Plate		(Argentina); Club Mendoza de Regatas	6
IV (1986); Details	(Argentina); Córdoba	(Brazil); Federal University of Santa Maria		(Brazil); Esporte Clube Sírio	(Argentina); Club Ferro Carril Oeste		(Argentina); Asociación Rieles Argentinos	6
V (1987); Details	(Argentina); Chapecó	(Brazil); Gremio Esport. e Recreat. SADIA- G.E.R.Sadia		(Argentina); Club Ferro Carril Oeste	(Brazil); Federal University of Santa Maria		(Uruguay); German School of Montevideo	5
VI (1988); Details	(Brazil); São Paulo	(Brazil); Gremio Esport. e Recreat. SADIA- G.E.R.Sadia		(Brazil); Esporte Clube Sírio	(Argentina); Instituto Nuestra Señora de Luján		(Paraguay); Club Libertad	5
1989	Cancelled							
VII (1990); Details	(Brazil); São Paulo	(Brazil); Universidad do Contestado-UnC/Concordia		(Brazil); Esporte Clube Banespa	(Argentina); SAG Villa Ballester		(Paraguay) ?	4
1991	Cancelled							
1992	Cancelled due to the lack of hosts.							
1993	Cancelled due to the lack of hosts.							
VIII (1994); Details	(Brazil); São Paulo	(Brazil); Esporte Clube Pinheiros		(Argentina); Instituto Nuestra Señora de Luján	(Brazil); Methodist University of São Paulo		(Argentina); Instituto Nac. de Ed. Física	4
1995	Cancelled							
IX (1996); Details	(Brazil); São Paulo	(Brazil); Methodist University of São Paulo		(Brazil); Esporte Clube Pinheiros	(Argentina); Ferro Carril Oeste de Merlo		(Uruguay); Colegio La Mennais	5
X (1997); Details	(Brazil); São Bernardo do Campo	(Argentina); Instituto Nuestra Señora de Luján		(Brazil); Esporte Clube Pinheiros	(Brazil); Methodist University of São Paulo		(Argentina); Club Atlético River Plate	6
XI (1998); Details	(Brazil); Recife	(Brazil); Methodist University of São Paulo		(Argentina); Instituto Nuestra Señora de Luján	(Brazil); Esporte Clube Pinheiros		(Argentina); Club Atlético River Plate	4
XII (1999); Details	(Brazil); São Bernardo do Campo	(Brazil); Methodist University of São Paulo		(Argentina); Instituto Nuestra Señora de Luján-Sinteplast	(Brazil); Instituto Municipal de Ensino Superior-IMES Sao Caetano		(Argentina); Sociedad Alemana de Gimnasia - SAG Lomas de Zamora	6
XIII (2000); Details	(Argentina); Buenos Aires	(Brazil); Methodist University of São Paulo		(Brazil); Esporte Clube Pinheiros	(Argentina); Club Atlético River Plate		(Argentina); Instituto Nuestra Señora de Luján	8
XIV (2001); Details	(Brazil); São Paulo	(Brazil); Methodist University of São Paulo		(Brazil); Esporte Clube Pinheiros	(Brazil); Instituto Municipal de Ensino Superior-IMES Sao Caetano		(Argentina); Instituto Nuestra Señora de Luján	8
2002	Cancelled due to overloaded calendar.							
2003	Cancelled							

== Medal table ==
Locations of the South American Men's Club Handball Championship winners

=== Per Club ===
Rank	Club	Gold	Silver	Bronze	Total
1	(Brazil) Methodist University of São Paulo	5	0	2	7
2	(Brazil) Federal University of Santa Maria	2	2	1	5
3	(Brazil) Gremio Esport. e Recreat. SADIA- G.E.R.Sadia	2	0	0	2
4	(Brazil) EC Pinheiros	1	4	1	6
5	(Argentina) Instituto Nuestra Señora de Luján	1	3	1	5
6	(Argentina) River Plate	1	0	2	3
6	(Argentina) SAG Villa Ballester	1	0	2	3
8	(Brazil) Universidad do Contestado-UnC/Concordia	1	0	0	1
9	(Brazil) Esporte Clube Sírio	0	2	0	2
10	(Argentina) Club Ferro Carril Oeste	0	1	1	2
11	(Brazil) Esporte Clube Banespa	0	1	0	1
11	(Brazil) Clube Olímpico de Maringá	0	1	0	1
13	(Brazil) Instituto Municipal de Ensino Superior-IMES Sao Caetano	0	0	2	2
14	(Argentina) Asociación de Fomento Amigos Lomas del Palomar - AFALP	0	0	1	1
14	(Argentina) Ferro Carril Oeste de Merlo	0	0	1	1
Totals (15 entries)		14	14	14	42

=== Per Nation ===
Rank	Nation	Gold	Silver	Bronze	Total
1	Brazil (BRA)	11	10	6	27
2	Argentina (ARG)	3	4	8	15
Totals (2 entries)		14	14	14	42
