= Nor.Ca. Handball Championship =

Nor.Ca Handball Championship may refer to either the men's or women's continental championship of the North America and Caribbean Handball Confederation.

See:

- Nor.Ca. Men's Handball Championship
- Nor.Ca. Women's Handball Championship
