= Chile national wheelchair handball team =

Chile

Information
- Nickname: La Roja
- Association: Chilean Handball Federation
- Coach: William Andrade

Colours
1st	2nd
- Last updated on 2024-06-09.

The Chile national wheelchair handball team is the national wheelchair handball team of Chile and is overseen by the Handball Federation of Chile.

== History ==
At unofficial world championship in Brazil in 2013 Chile won 4 silver and two bronze medals. Chile participated at the first Pan American Wheelchair Handball Championship in 2014 in all 5 categories. The men's won the bronze medal in the 4x4 cat B and the women's the silver medal in 7x7. At the first official world championship in Egypt in 2022 they finished at the fourth place.

== Competitive record ==
=== Wheelchair Handball World Championship ===
IHF Wheelchair Handball World Championship record (Four a Side)
Year	Position	GP	W	L	SW	SL	GF	GA
2022 Egypt	4th	6	2	4	8	10	49	77
2024 Egypt	6th							
Total	2/2	6	2	4	8	10	49	77

IHF Wheelchair Handball World Championship record (Six a Side)
Year	Position	GP	W	D	L	GF	GA
2022 Portugal	Did not participated						
Total	0/1	0	0	0	0	0	0

=== 2013 Inofficial wheelchair Handball World Championship ===
- Silver: 4×4 women, 4×4 mixed, 4×4 men cat A, 7×7 mixed
- Bronze: 7×7 men, 4×4 men cat B

=== Pan American Wheelchair Handball Championship ===
==== Men's ====
Pan American Men's 7x7 Wheelchair Handball Championship record
Year	Position	GP	W	D	L	GF	GA
2014 Argentina	5th	3	1	0	2	39	30
Total	1/1	3	1	0	2	39	30

Pan American Men's 4x4 Wheelchair Handball Championship record (Cat A)
Year	Position	GP	W	L	SW	SL	GF	GA
2014 Argentina	4th	3	1	2	4	2	25	21
Total	1/1	3	1	2	4	2	25	21

Pan American Men's 4x4 Wheelchair Handball Championship record (Cat B)
Year	Position	GP	W	L	SW	SL	GF	GA
2014 Argentina	3th	5	3	2	6	5	33	44
Total	1/1	5	3	2	6	5	33	44

==== Women's ====
Pan American Women's 7x7 Wheelchair Handball Championship record
Year	Position	GP	W	D	L	GF	GA
2014 Argentina	2nd	3	1	0	2	24	36
2019 Brazil	Did not participated						
Total	1/2	3	1	0	2	39	30

Pan American Women's 4x4 Wheelchair Handball Championship record
Year	Position	GP	W	L	SW	SL	GF	GA
2014 Argentina	4th	3	0	3	2	6	?	?
2019 Brazil	Did not participated							
Total	1/2	3	0	3	2	6	?	?

== Players ==
=== Current squad ===
These players were called up for the 2024 Wheelchair Handball World Championship.

==== Designed goalkeepers and field players ====
- 18 - Ricardo Martínez ( (Chile) Handball Adaptado Concepción)
- 12 - Juan Carlos Peña ( (Chile) Vikingos Adaptado)
- 7 - Jonathan Veas ( (Chile) Vikingos Adaptado)
- 66 - Ángel Hernández ( (Chile) Cruz del Sur)

==== Full-field players ====
- 2 - Luz María Carrasco ( (Chile) DACh)
- 5 - Jeisy Vilches ( (Chile) DACh)
- 16 - Noemí Álvarez ( (Chile) Cruz del Sur)
- 10 - Cristian Espinoza ( (Chile) Lobos de El Bosque)
- 26 - Jorge Carrasco ( (Chile) Lobos de El Bosque)
- 6 - Luis Orellana ( (Chile) Handball Adaptado Concepción)

== Staff ==
- Head Coach: William Andrade
- Assistant Coach: Catalina Jimeno
- Doctor: Magdalena Torres
- Physio: Amaya Iribarren
