= 2022 North American and Caribbean Senior Club Championship =

Tournament details
- Host country: Mexico
- Venue(s): 1 (in 1 host city)
- Dates: 25–30 July
- Teams: 6 (from 1 confederation)

Final positions
- Champions: (Mexico) Club Ministros (1st title)
- Runner-up: (Mexico) Vikingos de Sonora
- Third place: (United States) San Francisco CalHeat

Tournament statistics
- Matches played: 11
- Goals scored: 665 (60.45 per match)
- Top scorer(s): (Puerto Rico) Jorge Nazario (35 goals)

The 2022 North American and Caribbean Senior Club Championship was the third edition of the North American and Caribbean Senior Club Championship which is a qualifying tournament for the 2022 IHF Men's Super Globe. It was held in Monterrey, Mexico from 25 to 30 July 2022.

== Venue ==
The championship was played in Monterrey.

Fremont	2022 North American and Caribbean Senior Club Championship is located in Mexico
Gimnasio Nuevo León Unido; Capacity: 5 000	2022 North American and Caribbean Senior Club Championship is located in Mexico

== Teams ==
Locations of the 2022 North American and the Caribbean Senior Club Championship teams

Following teams were already qualified for the tournament.

Team	Qualified as
(United States) San Francisco CalHeat	Winner of USA Team Handball Nationals 2022
(United States) New York Athletic Club	Runner up of USA Team Handball Nationals 2022
(Mexico) Vikingos de Sonora	Winner of Mexican Senior Men's Champion 2022
(Mexico) Club Ministros de Monterrey	Runner up of Mexican Senior Men's Champion 2022
(Puerto Rico) Academia de Balonmano de Río Grande Guerrilleros	Winner of Puerto rican Senior Men's Champion 2022
(Canada) Club de Handball de Lévis	Winner of Canadian Senior Men's Champion 2022

== Results ==
All times are local (UTC–5).

=== Group A ===
Pos	Team	Pld	W	D	L	GF	GA	GD	Pts	Qualification
1	(United States) San Francisco CalHeat	2	2	0	0	51	44	+7	4	Semifinals
2	(Mexico) Club Ministros (H)	2	1	0	1	56	53	+3	2	Semifinals
3	(Canada) Club de Handball de Lévis	2	0	0	2	47	57	−10	0	Fifth place game

Source: NACHC
Rules for classification: 1) points; 2) points in the games between teams in question; 3) goal difference in the games between teams in question; 4) number of goals scored in the games between teams in question; 5) goal difference; 6) number of goals scored.
(H) Hosts

26 July 2022; 20:00	San Francisco CalHeat (United States)	27–23	(Mexico) Club Ministros	Gimnasio Nuevo León Unido, Monterrey; Referees: Johansen, Petersen (GRL)
26 July 2022; 20:00	Rubio 10	(14–13)	three players 3	Gimnasio Nuevo León Unido, Monterrey; Referees: Johansen, Petersen (GRL)
26 July 2022; 20:00	3× (yellow card) 5× (suspension)	Report	1× (yellow card) 5× (suspension) 1× (red card)	Gimnasio Nuevo León Unido, Monterrey; Referees: Johansen, Petersen (GRL)

27 July 2022; 20:00	Club Ministros (Mexico)	33–26	(Canada) Club de Handball de Lévis	Gimnasio Nuevo León Unido, Monterrey; Referees: Agramonte, de Jesús (DOM)
27 July 2022; 20:00	Muñiz, Urbina 5	(12–15)	Linze 9	Gimnasio Nuevo León Unido, Monterrey; Referees: Agramonte, de Jesús (DOM)
27 July 2022; 20:00	6× (suspension)	Report	2× (yellow card) 8× (suspension) 1× (red card)	Gimnasio Nuevo León Unido, Monterrey; Referees: Agramonte, de Jesús (DOM)

28 July 2022; 17:00	San Francisco CalHeat (United States)	24–21	(Canada) Club de Handball de Lévis	Gimnasio Nuevo León Unido, Monterrey; Referees: Belmonte, Coba
28 July 2022; 17:00	Donlin 5	(11–14)	Mercier 8	Gimnasio Nuevo León Unido, Monterrey; Referees: Belmonte, Coba
28 July 2022; 17:00	1× (yellow card) 6× (suspension) 1× (red card)	Report		Gimnasio Nuevo León Unido, Monterrey; Referees: Belmonte, Coba

=== Group B ===
Pos	Team	Pld	W	D	L	GF	GA	GD	Pts	Qualification
1	(Puerto Rico) Los Guerrilleros	2	2	0	0	76	68	+8	4	Semifinals
2	(Mexico) Vikingos de Sonora	2	1	0	1	80	69	+11	2	Semifinals
3	(United States) New York Athletic Club	2	0	0	2	64	83	−19	0	Fifth place game

Source: NACHC
Rules for classification: 1) points; 2) points in the games between teams in question; 3) goal difference in the games between teams in question; 4) number of goals scored in the games between teams in question; 5) goal difference; 6) number of goals scored.

26 July 2022; 16:30	Vikingos de Sonora (Mexico)	44–32	(United States) New York Athletic Club	Gimnasio Nuevo León Unido, Monterrey; Referees: Agramonte, de Jesús (DOM)
26 July 2022; 16:30	Contreras 8	(29–13)	Bayardo 11	Gimnasio Nuevo León Unido, Monterrey; Referees: Agramonte, de Jesús (DOM)
26 July 2022; 16:30	4× (suspension)	Report	5× (suspension)	Gimnasio Nuevo León Unido, Monterrey; Referees: Agramonte, de Jesús (DOM)

27 July 2022; 17:00	New York Athletic Club (United States)	32–39	(Puerto Rico) Los Guerrilleros	Gimnasio Nuevo León Unido, Monterrey; Referees: Belmonte, Coba
27 July 2022; 17:00	Bayardo 9	(16–16)	Nazario 8	Gimnasio Nuevo León Unido, Monterrey; Referees: Belmonte, Coba
27 July 2022; 17:00	4× (suspension)	Report	6× (suspension) 1× (red card)	Gimnasio Nuevo León Unido, Monterrey; Referees: Belmonte, Coba

28 July 2022; 20:00	Los Guerrilleros (Puerto Rico)	37–36	(Mexico) Vikingos de Sonora	Gimnasio Nuevo León Unido, Monterrey; Referees: Johansen, Petersen (GRL)
28 July 2022; 20:00	Mercado 12	(20–19)	Valenzuela 11	Gimnasio Nuevo León Unido, Monterrey; Referees: Johansen, Petersen (GRL)
28 July 2022; 20:00	2× (yellow card) 2× (suspension)	Report	1× (red card)	Gimnasio Nuevo León Unido, Monterrey; Referees: Johansen, Petersen (GRL)

== Knockout stage ==
=== Bracket ===
Semi-finals
29 July
(United States) San Francisco CalHeat	25
(Mexico) Vikingos de Sonora	27
29 July
(Puerto Rico) Los Guerrilleros	29
(Mexico) Club Ministros	31

Final
30 July
(Mexico) Vikingos de Sonora	22
(Mexico) Club Ministros	23
Third place
30 July
(United States) San Francisco CalHeat	32
(Puerto Rico) Los Guerrilleros	27

=== Fifth place game ===
29 July 2022
14:00
Club de Handball de Lévis (Canada)
38–37 (ET)
(United States) New York Athletic Club
Gimnasio Nuevo León Unido, Monterrey
Referees: Belmonte, Coba
Mercier 11
(13–13)
Bayardo 13
5× (suspension)
Report
7× (suspension)

FT: 31–31 ET: 7–6

=== Semifinals ===
29 July 2022; 17:00	San Francisco CalHeat (United States)	25–27	(Mexico) Vikingos de Sonora	Gimnasio Nuevo León Unido, Monterrey; Referees: Agramonte, de Jesús (DOM)
29 July 2022; 17:00	Donlin, Skogsholm 6	(9–12)	Contreras 9	Gimnasio Nuevo León Unido, Monterrey; Referees: Agramonte, de Jesús (DOM)
29 July 2022; 17:00	2× (yellow card) 15× (suspension)	Report	3× (suspension)	Gimnasio Nuevo León Unido, Monterrey; Referees: Agramonte, de Jesús (DOM)

29 July 2022; 20:00	Los Guerrilleros (Puerto Rico)	29–31	(Mexico) Club Ministros	Gimnasio Nuevo León Unido, Monterrey; Referees: Johansen, Petersen (GRL)
29 July 2022; 20:00	Nazario 13	(14–17)	Ávalos 6	Gimnasio Nuevo León Unido, Monterrey; Referees: Johansen, Petersen (GRL)
29 July 2022; 20:00	1× (yellow card) 4× (suspension)	Report	1× (yellow card) 6× (suspension)	Gimnasio Nuevo León Unido, Monterrey; Referees: Johansen, Petersen (GRL)

=== Third place game ===
30 July 2022; 14:00	San Francisco CalHeat (United States)	32–27	(Puerto Rico) Los Guerrilleros	Gimnasio Nuevo León Unido, Monterrey; Referees: Johansen, Petersen (GRL)
30 July 2022; 14:00	Rubio 10	(17–14)	Nazario 8	Gimnasio Nuevo León Unido, Monterrey; Referees: Johansen, Petersen (GRL)
30 July 2022; 14:00	3× (suspension)	Report	2× (yellow card) 5× (suspension) 2× (red card)	Gimnasio Nuevo León Unido, Monterrey; Referees: Johansen, Petersen (GRL)

=== Final ===
30 July 2022; 17:00	Vikingos de Sonora (Mexico)	22–23	(Mexico) Club Ministros	Gimnasio Nuevo León Unido, Monterrey; Referees: Agramonte, de Jesús (DOM)
30 July 2022; 17:00	Contreras 6	(14–8)	Ávalos 7	Gimnasio Nuevo León Unido, Monterrey; Referees: Agramonte, de Jesús (DOM)
30 July 2022; 17:00	1× (yellow card) 2× (suspension)	Report	4× (suspension)	Gimnasio Nuevo León Unido, Monterrey; Referees: Agramonte, de Jesús (DOM)

== Final standing ==
Rank	Team
1st place, gold medalist(s)	(Mexico) Club Ministros
2nd place, silver medalist(s)	(Mexico) Vikingos de Sonora
3rd place, bronze medalist(s)	(United States) San Francisco CalHeat
4	(Puerto Rico) Los Guerrilleros
5	(Canada) Club de Handball de Lévis
6	(United States) New York Athletic Club

Team qualified to the 2022 IHF Men's Super Globe
