= Peter Buehning Sr. =

Personal information
- Full name: Peter Gerhard Buehning
- Nationality: German & American
- Born: 3 February 1930 Hohenbudberg, Krefeld, Weimar Republic
- Died: 30 October 2003 (aged 73) Short Hills, United States

Sport
- Sport: Handball

Senior clubs
- Years: Team
- 1950s - 1960s: SSC Newark
National team
- Years: Team
- 1963: United States (Field)
- 1960s: United States (Indoor)

Teams managed
- –: United States (2nd Indoor)
- –: United States (Indoor)
- –: United States (Women)

Dr. Peter Gerhard Buehning Bühning (German) (3 February 1930 – 30 October 2003) was an American handball player, coach, referee and official.

== Early life ==
He was born in 1930 in Hohenbudberg a part of the city of Krefeld, in the Weimar Republic. Between 1944 and 1950 he was an apprentice as tinsmith and plumber. He studied at the Technische Hochschule Aachen in the winter semester 1950–51 and between 1951 and 1953 he studied at the Stevens Institute of Technology where he got the title mechanical engineer with high honor. He received the master from the Massachusetts Institute of Technology which he visited from 1953 until 1954. Between 1954 and 1957 he was a PhD student at the Institute for Fluid Mechanics and Fluid Machines at the University of Karlsruhe under H.E. Dickmann. His dissertation had the title Über das Verhalten von Extrem Schnelläufigen Axialmaschinen (German) (On the behavior of extremely high-speed axial machines). His oral exam was on 6 February 1957. In 2005 he was introduced in the Stevens Athletic Hall of Fame.

== Family ==
He married his wife Renate Buehning née Boumans on 11 July 1953. She was the team leader for the United States women's national handball team which participated at the Handball at the 1988 Summer Olympics – Women's tournament they reached the 7 place out of 8.

Two of his sons Peter Buehning Jr. ('76) and James Buehning ('84 & '88) competed both at the Olympics in Handball. A third son called Fritz Buehning was a professional tennis player. Additionally he had a daughter.

== Playing career ==
He played for the Swim and Sport Club of Flanders.

In 1963 he played at the IHF World Men's Outdoor Handball Championship they placed 8th out of 8. He was additionally the head of delegation. He scored the first goal of the tournament.

He played at the 1964 World Men's Handball Championship.

=== Field handball games ===
Nr.	Date	Result	Opponent	Place	Round	Goals of Buehning
1	May 1963	9:10	Canada		Test game	?
2	3 Jun 1963	6:23 (6:12)	West Germany	Switzerland, Schaffhausen	Preliminary	1
3	5 Jun 1963	4:17 (2:11)	Switzerland	Switzerland, Basel, St. Jakob Stadium	Preliminary	2
4	6 Jun 1963	5:11 (3:6)	Netherlands	Switzerland, Biel	Preliminary	1
5	9 Jun 1963	5:16 (3:4)	Israel	Switzerland, Basel	7th place game	1

== Coaching career ==
He was coach for the 2nd team of the United States in 1969.

At the 1972 Olympic he coached the men's team of the United States they placed 14th out of 16.

In 1975 he was coach of the United States women's team for the 1975 World Women's Handball Championship they won one game against Tunisia and finished at the 11th place.

== Referee ==
At the 1984 Olympic his son Peter was with his partner Bernie Iwasczyszyn referee of four games.

== Official career ==
He was president of the United States Team Handball Federation from 1961 until 1995. He was the first president of the Pan-American Team Handball Federation from 1977 until 1980 and again from 1987 until 1996.

He was part of the IHF Council and vice president of the IHF from 1972 through 1998.

In 2000 he became an IHF Honorary Member.

He was member of the United States Olympic Committee Board of Directors from 1967 until 1995.

== Publications ==
=== Engineering ===
- A study of the transition of a laminar water boundary layer in a tube. Massachusetts Institute of Technology. 1954. OCLC 31057080. (Thesis)
- Über das Verhalten von extrem schnelläufigen Axialmaschinen (in German). Karlsruhe: University of Karlsruhe. 1957. OCLC 52664623. (Dissertation)
- On the Selection of Propeller Diameter and RPM for Optimum Performance of Nozzle Propellers. Hillside, New Jersey: Accurate Products Co. 1960.
- Design of Nozzle Propellers. Defense Technical Information Center. 1967. OCLC 227635256.

=== Handball ===
- Team handball; rules of the game. Short Hills, New Jersey: United States Team Handball Federation. 1970. OCLC 1386682.
- Team handball training. Hillside, New Jersey: United States Team Handball Federation. 1971. OCLC 1414825.
