= Greenlandic Men's Handball Championship =

- Founded: 1974
- No. of teams: ~4-6
- Country: Greenland
- Confederation: NACHC
- Most recent champion: GSS
- Most titles: NÛK (min. 11 titles)
- Level on pyramid: 1
- 2020 Greenlandic Men's Handball Championship

The Greenlandic Men's Handball Championship is a handball tournament to determine the National Champion from Greenland.

== Results ==
Year	Final			3rd place match			Teams
Year	Champions	Score	Runners-up	3rd place	Score	4th place	Teams
1974; Nuuk	GSS -1-		B-67	K-33		S-68	5
1975; Nuuk	S-68 -1-	Round-robin	K-33	GSS	Round-robin	B-67	5
1976; Nuuk	GSS -2-	23-15	B-67	S-68	24-14	K-33	6
1977; Nuuk	GSS -3-		B-67	S-68		NÛK	6
1978; Qaqortoq	NÛK -1-		SAK	K-33		S-68	6
1979; Nuuk	B-67 -1-		S-68	NÛK	–	–	3
1980; Ilulissat	S-68 -2-		N-48	NÛK	–	–	3
1981; Nuuk	S-68 -3-		B-67	N-48		Aqigssiaq Maniitsoq	7
1982; Maniitsoq	S-68 -4-		Aqigssiaq Maniitsoq	B-67		N-48	6
1983; Qaqortoq	S-68 -5-		B-67	NÛK		Aqigssiaq Maniitsoq	8
1984; Nuuk	B-67 -2-		S-68	NÛK		N-48	8
1985; Ilulissat	I-69 -1-		K-33	B-67		N-48	4
1986; Paamiut	Aqigssiaq Maniitsoq -1-		K-33	I-69		NÛK	8
1987; Nuuk	I-69 -2-		NÛK	K-33		Aqigssiaq Maniitsoq	8
1988; Sisimiut	I-69 -3-		Aqigssiaq Maniitsoq	SAK		K-33	6
1989; Maniitsoq	I-69 -4-		Aqigssiaq Maniitsoq	K-33		NÛK	4
1990; Ilulissat	I-69 -5-		NÛK	K-33		SAK	6
1991; Nuuk	NÛK -2-		K-33	I-69	–	–	3
1992; Qaqortoq	SAK -1-		NÛK	I-69		K-33	5
1993; Sisimiut	SAK I -2-		NÛK	I-69		SAK II	6
1994; Nuuk	NÛK -3-		SAK	K-33		I-69	6
1995; Maniitsoq	NÛK -4-		K-33	SAK		Kagssagssuk Maniitsoq	6
1996; Nuuk	NÛK -5-		SAK	K-33		I-69	6
1997; Nuuk	NÛK -6-		K-33	N-48		SAK	7
1998; Ilulissat	NÛK -7-		K-33	N-48		SAK	7
1999; Nuuk	NÛK -8-		K-33	SAK		N-48	4
2000; Sisimiut	K-33 -1-		N-48	SAK		NÛK	6
2001; Nuuk	NÛK I -9-		K-33	N-48		N-85	9
2002; Sisimiut	NÛK -10-		N-48	SAK		Kagssagssuk Maniitsoq	
2003; Qaqortoq	K-33 -2-		Kagssagssuk Maniitsoq	SAK		NÛK	8
2004; Nuuk	NÛK -11-		N-48	K-33		SAK	6
2005	N-48 -1-						
2006							
2007							
2008							
2009							
2010							
2011							
2012							
2013							
2014							
2015							
2016							
2017							
2018; Nuuk	GSS -?-	28-14	N-48	NÛK	27-17	Norsaq HC	6
2019	GSS -?-	32-26	NÛK	N-48	41-24	Norsaq HC	4
2020		Postponed to the fall					
2021; Nuuk	GSS -?-	32-24	NÛK	Aqigssiaq Maniitsoq	30-29	N-48	6

Places from 1974 until 2004:
