= South American Junior Handball Championship =

The South American Junior Handball Championship is the official competition for Junior Men's and Women's national handball teams of South America, and takes place every two years. In addition to crowning the South American champions, the tournament also serves as a qualifying tournament for the Pan American Junior Handball Championship.

== Men ==
=== Summary ===
| Year | Host | Final | | | Third place match | | |
| Year | Host | Champion | Score | Runner-up | Third place | Score | Fourth place |
|---|---|---|---|---|---|---|---|
| 2000; Details | (Brazil); Cascavel | Brazil | No playoffs | Argentina | Chile | No playoffs | Paraguay |
| 2002; Details | (Brazil); São Miguel do Iguaçu | Brazil | No playoffs | Argentina | Chile | No playoffs | Uruguay |
| 2004; Details | (Brazil); Cascavel | Brazil | No playoffs | Argentina | Chile | No playoffs | Uruguay |
| 2006; Details | (Argentina); Buenos Aires | Argentina | No playoffs | Brazil | Uruguay | No playoffs | Chile |

=== Medal table ===
| Rank | Nation | Gold | Silver | Bronze | Total |
|---|---|---|---|---|---|
| 1 | Brazil | 3 | 1 | 0 | 4 |
| 2 | Argentina | 1 | 3 | 0 | 4 |
| 3 | Chile | 0 | 0 | 3 | 3 |
| 4 | Uruguay | 0 | 0 | 1 | 1 |
| Totals (4 entries) | | 4 | 4 | 4 | 12 |

=== Participating nations ===
| Nation | (Brazil) 2000 | (Brazil) 2002 | (Brazil) 2004 | (Argentina) 2006 | Years |
|---|---|---|---|---|---|
| Argentina | 2nd | 2nd | 2nd | 1st | 4 |
| Brazil | 1st | 1st | 1st | 2nd | 4 |
| Chile | 3rd | 3rd | 3rd | 4th | 4 |
| Paraguay | 4th | 5th | 5th | 5th | 4 |
| Uruguay | 5th | 4th | 4th | 3rd | 4 |
| Total | 5 | 5 | 5 | 5 | |

== Women ==
=== Summary ===
| Year | Host | Final | | | Third place match | | |
| Year | Host | Champion | Score | Runner-up | Third place | Score | Fourth place |
|---|---|---|---|---|---|---|---|
| 2000; Details | (Brazil); Cascavel | Brazil | No playoffs | Uruguay | Argentina | No playoffs | Paraguay |
| 2002; Details | (Brazil); Cascavel | Brazil | No playoffs | Uruguay | Argentina | No playoffs | Paraguay |
| 2004; Details | (Brazil); Cascavel | Brazil | No playoffs | Argentina | Uruguay | No playoffs | Paraguay |
| 2006; Details | (Argentina); Buenos Aires | Argentina | 23–20 | Brazil | Uruguay | 28–27 | Chile |
| 2013; Details | (Paraguay); Asunción | Argentina | No playoffs | Brazil | Uruguay | No playoffs | Paraguay |

=== Medal table ===
| Rank | Nation | Gold | Silver | Bronze | Total |
|---|---|---|---|---|---|
| 1 | Brazil | 3 | 2 | 0 | 5 |
| 2 | Argentina | 2 | 1 | 2 | 5 |
| 3 | Uruguay | 0 | 2 | 3 | 5 |
| Totals (3 entries) | | 5 | 5 | 5 | 15 |

=== Participating nations ===
| Nation | (Brazil) 2000 | (Brazil) 2002 | (Brazil) 2004 | (Argentina) 2006 | (Paraguay) 2013 | Years |
|---|---|---|---|---|---|---|
| Argentina | 3rd | 3rd | 2nd | 1st | 1st | 5 |
| Brazil | 1st | 1st | 1st | 2nd | 2nd | 5 |
| Chile | 5th | 5th | 5th | 4th | 5th | 5 |
| Paraguay | 4th | 4th | 4th | - | 4th | 4 |
| Uruguay | 2nd | 2nd | 3rd | 3rd | 3rd | 5 |
| Total | 5 | 5 | 5 | 4 | 5 | |
