= Pan American Women's Cadet Handball Championship =

Competition for Cadet women's national handball teams of Americas

The Pan American Women's Cadet Handball Championship is the official competition for Cadet women's national handball teams of Americas.

== Summary ==
Year	Host	Final			Third place match		
Year	Host	Champion	Score	Runner-up	Third place	Score	Fourth place
2005; Details	(Brazil); Brusque	Argentina	No playoffs	Brazil	Paraguay	No playoffs	Uruguay
2006; Details	(Brazil); Blumenau	Argentina	23–18	Brazil	Uruguay	23–19	Paraguay
2007; Details	(Brazil); Cascavel	Brazil	No playoffs	Argentina	Uruguay	No playoffs	Mexico
2008; Details	(Brazil); Blumenau	Brazil	30–14	Uruguay	Argentina	17–12	Paraguay

== Medal table ==
Rank	Nation	Gold	Silver	Bronze	Total
1	Brazil	2	2	0	4
2	Argentina	2	1	1	4
3	Uruguay	0	1	2	3
4	Paraguay	0	0	1	1
Totals (4 entries)		4	4	4	12

== Participating nations ==
Nation	(Brazil) 2005	(Brazil) 2006	(Brazil) 2007	(Brazil) 2008	Years
Argentina	1st	1st	2nd	3rd	4
Brazil	2nd	2nd	1st	1st	4
Canada	-	7th	-	-	1
Chile	5th	5th	6th	6th	4
Mexico	-	6th	4th	7th	3
Paraguay	3rd	4th	5th	4th	4
Puerto Rico	-	-	-	5th	1
Uruguay	4th	3rd	3rd	2nd	4
Venezuela	-	-	-	8th	1
Total	5	7	6	8	
