= Stanbridge Academy =

School in California, United States

Location
- 515 E. Poplar Ave; San Mateo, CA 94401; United States
- Coordinates: 37.575323°N 122.330459°W

Information
- Type: private
- Religious affiliation(s): nonsectarian
- Established: 1982; 43 years ago
- Grades: K–12
- Gender: coeducational
- Campus size: 50,149 sq ft (4,659.0 m^{2})
- Accreditation: CAIS, WASC
- Website: stanbridgeacademy.org

Stanbridge Academy is a K–12 school for students with mild to moderate learning differences and social communication challenges. Stanbridge Academy was founded in 1982, and its campus is located in San Mateo, California, United States.

== Description and history ==
The school's mission statement is: "Stanbridge Academy is a caring, inclusive K–12 school for students with mild to moderate learning differences and social communication disorders. We use an individualized, whole student approach so that students thrive and develop their academic, social, and emotional capabilities to their fullest potential."

Stanbridge was founded in 1982 by Andi Jobe to support students with mild to moderate learning disabilities, after she found her own children's needs had not been met by other schools. The school first was accredited by the Western Association of Schools and Colleges (WASC) in 1998 and moved to its current campus on East Poplar Avenue the next year. Jobe served as head of school until 2000.

In May 2018, Stanbridge Academy was accepted as a member of the California Association of Independent Schools (CAIS) for a seven-year maximum accreditation term. In November 2017, Stanbridge Academy's accreditation with WASC was also renewed for the maximum seven years.

Stanbridge is a partner in the NASA Neurodiversity Network (N3) alongside other high schools in the Bay Area, including the Anova Center for Education (Santa Rosa), Oak Hill School (San Anselmo) and Orion Academy (Moraga). N3 provides learning modules developed under the direction of Professor Lynn Cominsky at Sonoma State University; the curriculum is designed to engage students in informal NASA activities and inspire them to pursue careers in STEM.
