= USA Team Handball =

Governing body for handball in the United States

USA Team Handball USATH
- IOC nation: United States of America (USA)
- Sport: Handball
- Other sports: Beach handball Wheelchair handball
- Official website: www.usateamhandball.org

History
- Preceding organizations: United States Team Handball Federation (1959–2006)
- Year of formation: April 30, 2008; 17 years ago

Affiliations
- International federation: International Handball Federation (IHF)
- IHF member since: 1962; 63 years ago
- Continental association: North America and Caribbean Handball Confederation
- National Olympic Committee: United States Olympic & Paralympic Committee

Governing body
- President: Patrick Jalabert (Interim)

Headquarters
- Address: 1 Olympic Plaza, Colorado Springs, Colorado
- Country: United States of America
- Chief Executive: Martin Branick

Finance
- Sponsors: Verizon Communications, Molten Corporation, Hummel

USA Team Handball is the governing body for handball in the United States. USA Team Handball is funded in part by the U.S. Olympic & Paralympic Committee. Previously, the governing body was the United States Team Handball Federation.

USA Team Handball is led by an 9-person Board of Directors. The interim president is Patrick Jalabert.

USA Team Handball organizes the participation of U.S. national teams in international competitions, such as the Summer Olympics and the Pan American Games. The United States men's national handball team and the United States women's national handball team have struggled in international competitions against nations where handball is more popular.

USA Team Handball organizes and sanctions the USA Team Handball Nationals and USA Team Handball College Nationals.

On February 3, 2023, CEO Ryan Johnson announced he was stepping down on February 28. President Michael Wall announced Martin Branick was elevated to interim CEO starting March 1.

== List of presidents ==
The first president was elected in 1959.

Nr.	Name	From	To
1	Dieter Esch	2008	2012
2	Jeff Utz	2012	2013
3	Harvey Schiller	2014	February 5, 2018
	Bob Djokovich (Interim President)	February 5, 2018	2018
4	Bob Djokovich	2018	August 13, 2019
5	Michael J. Wall	August 13, 2019	June 19, 2024
	Patrick Jalabert (Interim President)	June 19, 2024	Present

== List of CEOs ==
Name	From	To
Matt Van Houten	October 19, 2012	2014
Michael Cavanaugh	2014	April 17th, 2019
Barry Siff	April 17th, 2019	July 18th, 2020
Ryan Johnson	December 9th, 2020	February 28th, 2023
Martin Branick	March 1st, 2023	Present

== See also ==
- Handball in the United States
