= South American Youth Handball Championship =

Handball Tournament

The South American Youth Handball Championship is the official competition for Youth Men's and Women's national handball teams of South America. In addition to crowning the South American champions, the tournament also serves as a qualifying tournament for the Pan American Youth Handball Championship.

== Men ==
=== Summary ===
Year	Host	Final			Third place match		
Year	Host	Champion	Score	Runner-up	Third place	Score	Fourth place
2002; Details	(Brazil); Foz do Iguaçu	Argentina	No playoffs	Brazil	Chile	No playoffs	Uruguay

=== Medal table ===
Rank	Nation	Gold	Silver	Bronze	Total
1	Argentina	1	0	0	1
2	Brazil	0	1	0	1
3	Chile	0	0	1	1
Totals (3 entries)		1	1	1	3

=== Participating nations ===
Nation	(Brazil) 2002	Years
Argentina	1st	1
Brazil	2nd	1
Chile	3rd	1
Paraguay	5th	1
Uruguay	4th	1
Total	5	

== Women ==
=== Summary ===
Year	Host	Final			Third place match		
Year	Host	Champion	Score	Runner-up	Third place	Score	Fourth place
2002; Details	(Brazil); Foz do Iguaçu	Brazil	No playoffs	Argentina	Paraguay	No playoffs	Uruguay

=== Medal table ===
Rank	Nation	Gold	Silver	Bronze	Total
1	Brazil	1	0	0	1
2	Argentina	0	1	0	1
3	Paraguay	0	0	1	1
Totals (3 entries)		1	1	1	3

=== Participating nations ===
Nation	(Brazil) 2002	Years
Argentina	2nd	1
Brazil	1st	1
Chile	5th	1
Paraguay	3rd	1
Uruguay	4th	1
Total	5	
