= Dominican Republic Handball Federation =

Governing body for handball in the Dominican Republic

Dominican Republic Handball Federation Spanish: Federación Dominicana de Balonmano DRHF
- IOC nation: Dominican Republic (DOM)
- Sport: Handball
- Other sports: Beach handball
- Official website: www.fedobalon.com

HISTORY
- Year of formation: 1982; 43 years ago

AFFILIATIONS
- International federation: International Handball Federation (IHF)
- IHF member since: 1982
- Continental association: North America and the Caribbean Handball Confederation
- National Olympic Committee: Dominican Republic Olympic Committee

GOVERNING BODY
- President: Miguel Antonio Rivera

HEADQUARTERS
- Address: Boulevard del Faro, Parque del Este, Complejo Deportivo, Pabellon de Balonmano Domingo
- Country: Dominican Republic
- Secretary General: Miguel Angel Tapia Bido

The Dominican Republic Handball Federation (Spanish: Federación Dominicana de Balonmano) (DRHF) is the administrative and controlling body for handball and beach handball in Dominican Republic. Founded in 1982, DRHF is a member of North America and the Caribbean Handball Confederation (NACHC) and the International Handball Federation (IHF).

== National teams ==
- Dominican Republic men's national handball team
- Dominican Republic men's national junior handball team
- Dominican Republic women's national handball team
