= Mario Moccia =

Current position
- Title: Athletic director

Biographical details
- Born: September 3, 1967 (age 59)

Playing career
- 1986–1989: New Mexico State

Administrative career (AD unless noted)
- 1993–1997: New Mexico (Assistant AD)
- 1997–1998: Southwest Texas State (Associate AD)
- 1998–2006: Missouri (Associate AD)
- 2006–2014: Southern Illinois
- 2015–2025: New Mexico State

Mario Moccia (born September 3, 1967) is the former director of athletics for New Mexico State University. He previously served as athletic director for Southern Illinois University Carbondale from 2006 to 2014, as an associate athletic director at the University of Missouri from 1998 to 2006, as an associate athletic director at Southwest Texas State University from 1997 to 1998, and as an assistant athletic director at the University of New Mexico from 1993 to 1997. Moccia attended college at New Mexico State University, where he played on the New Mexico State Aggies baseball team.

== New Mexico State ==
Moccia was named athletic director at New Mexico State University on November 24, 2014.

He signed a new five-year contract in July 2019 which runs through the 2023–24 academic year and pays him $280,000 annually.

He was fired from NMSU on January 2, 2025, following an investigation by the New Mexico Department of Justice in the culture within the 2022-23 NMSU basketball team, namely a lack of discipline and a failure to protect student workers and players from sexual hazing and sexual assault committed by student athletes.
