= Canadian Team Handball Federation =

Governing body of team handball in Canada

Canadian Team Handball Federation French: Fédération Canadienne de handball par équipe CTHF
- IOC nation: Canada (CAN)
- Sport: Handball
- Other sports: Beach Handball; Wheelchair handball
- Official website: www.handballcanada.ca

HISTORY
- Year of formation: 1962; 63 years ago

DEMOGRAPHICS
- Membership size: 7 Members

AFFILIATIONS
- International federation: International Handball Federation (IHF)
- IHF member since: 1962
- Continental association: North America and the Caribbean Handball Confederation
- National Olympic Committee: Canadian Olympic Committee
- Other affiliation(s): Commonwealth Handball Association

GOVERNING BODY
- President: Carrie Kuypers
- Address: Quebec
- Country: Canada

The Canadian Team Handball Federation, CTHF, is the governing body of team handball in Canada. It was founded in 1962 and joined the International Handball Federation the same year.

The CTHF is a member of the North America and the Caribbean Handball Confederation and the Commonwealth Handball Association. The CTHF is made up of the following voting member provinces: British Columbia, Alberta, Saskatchewan, Manitoba, Ontario, Quebec, and New Brunswick.

The CTHF sanctions three national tournaments each year for three categories, senior (22 and over), junior (21 and under), and juvenile (19 and under) both men and women subcategories exist within each age category. The tournaments are hosted and organized by one of the member provinces. The winner of the tournament is awarded the title of National Champions for the year until the tournament is held again.

== National Teams ==
The Canada men's and women's senior national handball team competes under North American and the Caribbean Handball confederation (NACHC). The senior men's team, is currently led by Head Coach, Christian Tulippe. The men have competed in the Pan American games a total of six times and the senior women, currently led by Nathalie Brochu, winner of the 2023 Canadian Coach of the Year Award from the Coaching Association of Canada, have competed five times since Handball was introduced at the 1987 Pan Am games in Indianapolis. The men's team best finish is fourth in 1987 and 1991. The women's team best finish has resulted in winning silver three times in 1987, 1995 and 1999. There was no competition held for women in the 1991 edition of the tournament. Both teams are trying to qualify for the 2027 edition in Lima, Peru. Canada's men's team has won one silver and two bronze at the Pan American Men's Handball Championship.

== Tournaments Hosted ==
Canada has hosted the 1999 Pan Am Games handball tournament in Winnipeg, Manitoba and the 2015 Pan Am Games handball tournament in Toronto, Ontario. These events were hosted by the Canadian Olympic Committee not by the Canadian Team Handball Federation. However Canada Handball did get to attend because of automatic qualification.

== See also ==
- Canada men's national handball team
- Canada women's national handball team
