= North America and Caribbean Handball Confederation =

Handball federation

North America and the Caribbean Handball Confederation NACHC
- Sport: Handball
- Other sports: Beach handball
- Official website: norcahandball.com

History
- Preceding organisations: Pan-American Team Handball Federation (1977 – 2019)
- Year of formation: 13 April 2019; 7 years ago Santo Domingo, Dominican Republic

Demographics
- Membership size: 21 members

Affiliations
- International federation: International Handball Federation (IHF)
- IHF member since: 2019

Governance
- President: Mario García de la Torre

Secretariat
- Address: 1 Olympic Plaza, Colorado Springs, CO 80909
- Country: United States of America
- Secretary General: Miguel Rivera

Regions
- North America; Caribbean

The North America and the Caribbean Handball Confederation (NACHC) is the governing body of the Olympic sport of handball and beach handball in North America and the Caribbean. It is affiliated to the International Handball Federation (IHF).

The NACHC has 21 member countries located within North America and the Caribbean. One of the IHF's six continental confederations, the NACHC was formed officially on 13 April 2019 in Santo Domingo (Dominican Republic). The NACHC headquarters is located in Colorado Springs (United States).

== History ==
On 14 January 2018, during the IHF Council meeting, Pan-American Team Handball Federation was suspended by International Handball Federation and was divided into two continental confederations, namely the North America and the Caribbean Handball Confederation and the South and Central America Handball Confederation. The IHF Council decision was taken on the fact that there were no signs of development at the level of handball and beach handball in the North American, Central American and the Caribbean countries. There was some development at the South American countries, but that was also not comparable to the other continents like Europe and Asia. No team from the Americas had ever reached to the semifinal stage of the IHF World Men's Handball Championship and the IHF Men's Junior World Championship. The PATHF appealed to the Court of Arbitration for Sport, and it annulled the IHF's decision.

At the Extraordinary IHF Congress 2019 the IHF statues were revised to add the new federations.

On 29 October 2019 the new headquarters was opened at the bureaus of USA Team Handball.

== NACHC presidents ==
No.	Name	Country	Tenure
1	Mario García de la Torre	Mexico	1 June 2019 – present

== NACHC secretaries general ==
No.	Name	Country	Tenure
1	Miguel Rivera	Dominican Republic	1 June 2019 – 2025
2	Fitzroy Clarke	Saint Kitts and Nevis	2025 – present

== NACHC Council ==
The following are the members serving in the 2019–2023 term.

Designation	Name	Country
President	Mario García de la Torre	Mexico
Vice-President	Néstor Milete Echevarria	Puerto Rico
Secretary General	Miguel Rivera	Dominican Republic
Treasurer	Felix Wilson	Dominica
Chairperson of Competitions Commission	Kurt Lauritsen	Greenland
Chairperson of Playing Rules and Referees Commission	François Lebeau	Canada
Chairperson of Methods Commission	Franklyn S. Guevara Balcazar	Cuba
Chairperson of Beach Handball Commission	Cliff Williams	Antigua and Barbuda
Chairperson of Women's Commission	Mrs. Carline Choute	Haiti
Chairperson of Medical Commission	Dr. Armand Llewellyn Harper	Barbados

== Affiliated members ==
North America

- Canada
- Greenland
- Mexico
- United States of America

Caribbean

- Antigua and Barbuda
- (The Bahamas) Bahamas
- Barbados
- British Virgin Islands ✝
- Cayman Islands ✝
- Cuba
- Dominica
- Dominican Republic
- Grenada ✝
- Haiti
- Jamaica
- Guadeloupe
- Martinique
- Puerto Rico
- Saint Kitts and Nevis
- Saint Lucia
- Trinidad and Tobago
- ✝ means non-active member

== Tournaments ==
=== National ===
- Nor.Ca. Men's Handball Championship
- Nor.Ca. Women's Handball Championship

=== Club ===
- North American and Caribbean Senior Club Championship

=== Beach ===
- Nor.Ca. Beach Handball Championship

== Current champions ==
	Men's	Women's
Senior Handball	United States (2026) (2*)	Cuba (2025) (3*)
Beach Handball	United States (2026) (4*)	United States (2026) (3*)
Club Handball	(United States) Los Angeles THC (2026) (1)	

(Titles) (*) Record titles
