= James Buehning =

American handball player (born 1957)

Personal information
- Full name: James Johann Buehning
- Born: June 3, 1957 (age 69); Summit, New Jersey, US

James Johann Buehning (born June 3, 1957 in Summit, New Jersey) is an American former handball player who competed in the 1984 Summer Olympics and in the 1988 Summer Olympics.
