= Sisimiut-68 =

Greenlandic sports club

S-68
- Founded: 1968

S-68 was a sports club from Greenland based in Sisimiut. They competed in football and handball.

== Achievements ==
- Greenlandic Women's Football Championship: 1
  - Champion : 1992
  - Third: 1991, 1996, 2000
- Greenlandic Men's Handball Championship: 5
  - Champion: 1975, 1980, 1981, 1982, 1983
