= Godthåbhallen =

Sports venue in Nuuk, Greenland

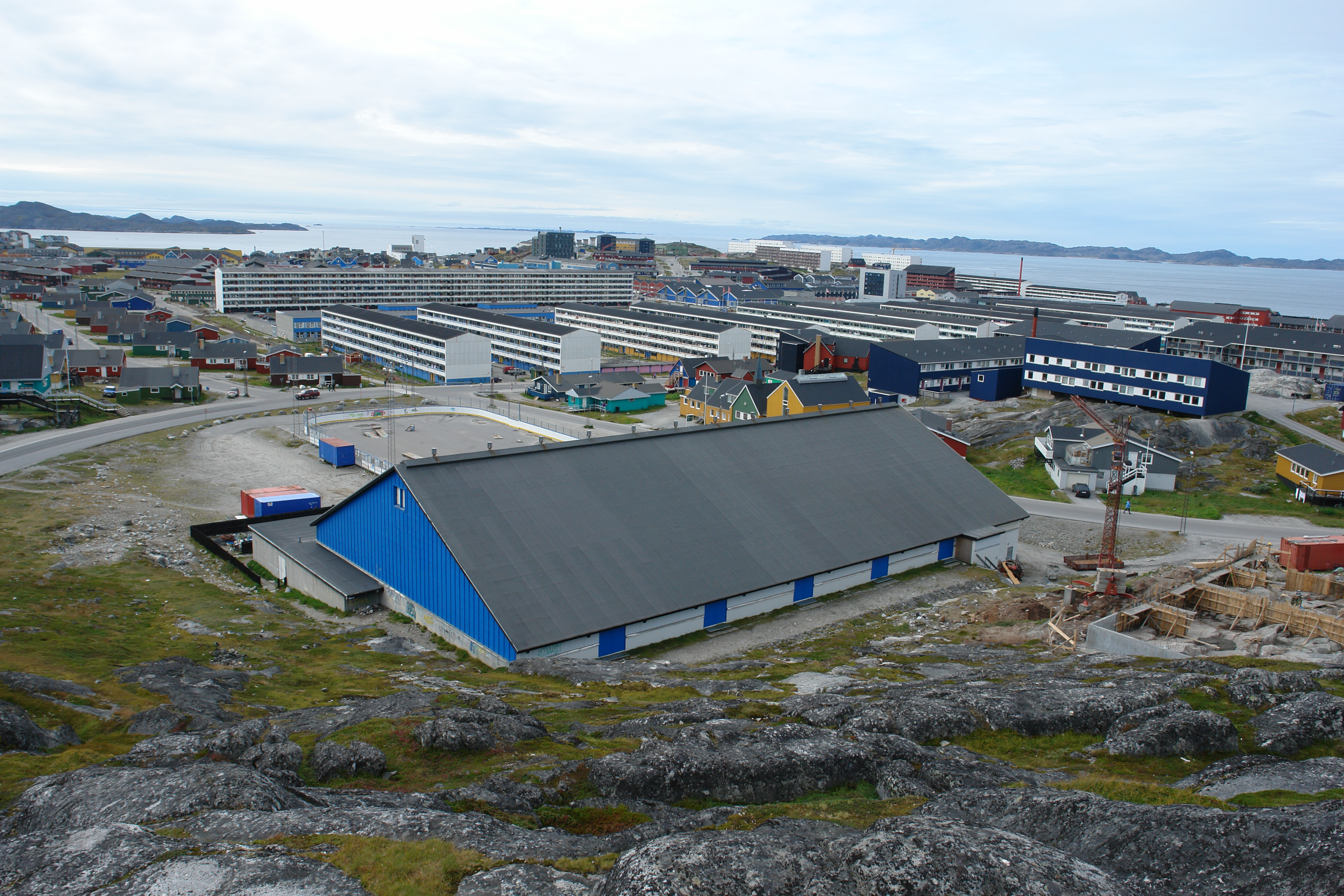
- Godthåbhallen exterior
- Interactive map of Godthåbhallen
- Location: Nuuk (Godthåb), Sermersooq, Greenland
- Coordinates: 64.1781°N 51.7277°W
- Owner: Municipality of Sermersooq
- Operator: Greenland Handball Federation
- Capacity: 1,000
- Surface: Indoor

Construction
- Groundbreaking: 1960
- Built: 1961
- Opened: 1961

Tenant
- Team Grønland

Website
- www.ghb-hallen.gl

Godthåbhallen is a handball stadium in Nuuk, Greenland. It is the home of the Greenland men's national handball team. The stadium has a capacity of 1,000 people.

The stadium was built in 1961, and is a multi-purpose venue, housing events ranging from concerts to bingo to zumba and bodytoning. The stadium used to be the venue of choice for bigger artists, but since the 2002 completion of the indoor Inussivik sports centre, near Nuuk Stadium, all major artists use this newer, spacier venue. Godthåbhallen is located 400 meters from Nuuk Stadium. An ice skating arena which is open to the public is right outside the hall.

Godthåbhallen hosted the futsal tournament at the 2016 Arctic Winter Games.
