= Zuloaga =

Zuloaga is a Basque surname. Notable people with the surname include:

- Antonio de Zuloaga (died 1722), a Roman Catholic prelate who served as Archbishop of Lima
- Daniel Zuloaga Boneta (1852–1921), a Spanish painter and ceramist, uncle of Ignacio
- Elisa Elvira Zuloaga (1900–1980), Venezuelan painter and engraver
- Eusebio Zuloaga González (1808–1898), a Spanish gunsmith and promoter of the art of damascening, father of Daniel and Plácido
- Félix María Zuloaga Trillo (1803–1898), Conservative president of Mexico during the Reform War
- Ignacio Zuloaga y Zabaleta (1870–1945), a Spanish painter
- Jorge Zuloaga (1922–2022), known artistically as El Topolino, a Colombian comedian, actor, journalist and screenwriter
- Luis Zuloaga (1922–2013), Venezuelan baseball pitcher
- Matías Zuloaga (born 1997), Argentine cross-country skier
- Pablo Zuloaga (born 1981), Spanish politician
- Plácido Zuloaga (1834–1910), Spanish sculptor and metalworker, father of Ignacio
- Ricardo Zuloaga (1867–1932), Venezuelan businessman
- Victoria Zuloaga (born 1988), Argentine field hockey player

== See also ==
- Óscar Machado Zuloaga International Airport
