= Khalili Collection of Spanish Metalwork =

Collection of Spanish damascened metalwork

Nasser D. Khalili Collection of Spanish Metalwork
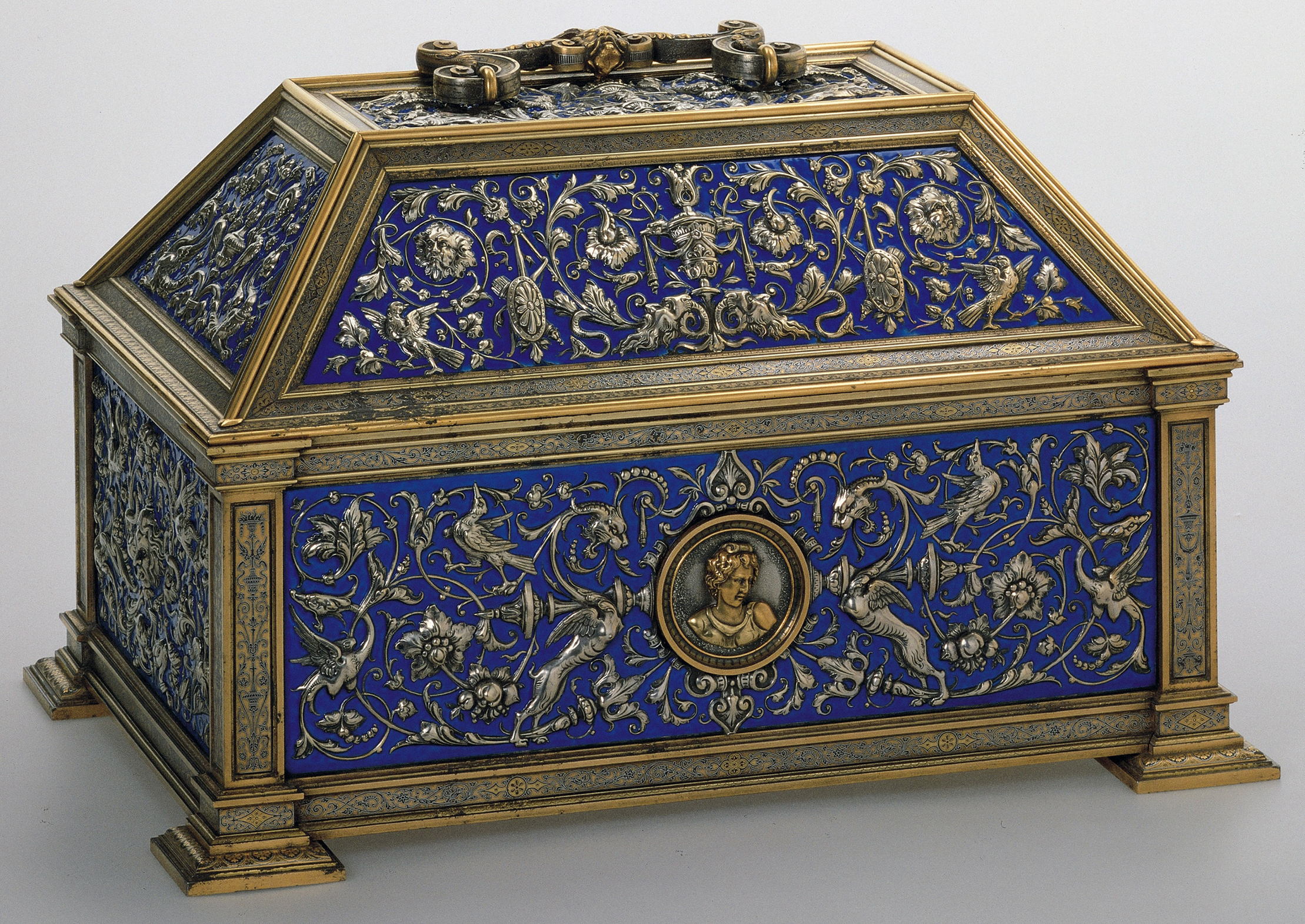
- Bronze gilt and enamelled casket by Plácido Zuloaga, 1891–1892
- Curators: Nasser D. Khalili (founder); Dror Elkvity (Curator and Chief Co-ordinator); James D. Lavin (Special Advisor)
- Size (no. of items): 150
- Website: https://khalilicollections.org/all-collections/spanish-damascene-metalwork/

The Khalili Collection of Spanish Damascene Metalwork is a private collection assembled by the British scholar, collector and philanthropist Nasser D. Khalili. It includes more than 150 examples of damascened metalwork, in which gold or silver is pressed into an iron surface to create fine decoration. It is one of eight collections assembled, conserved, published and exhibited by Khalili, each of which is considered among the most important in its field. The collection includes art works from 1850 to the early twentieth century, including many from the workshop of Plácido Zuloaga and other works from artists trained or influenced by Zuloaga. Almost all the works are from Eibar or Toledo.

Khalili, who also owns the world's largest private collection of Islamic art, first encountered damascening in that context, and regards Spain as having "raised the art to the pinnacle of perfection" so began to collect Spanish damascene as well. The collection has been the basis for international exhibitions including at the Victoria and Albert Museum in London, the Bilbao Fine Arts Museum and the Alhambra Palace in Granada. Alan Borg, when Director of the Victoria and Albert Museum, described the collection's catalogue as "a landmark in the study of nineteenth-century Spanish decorative art".

== Works ==
=== Works from Eibar ===
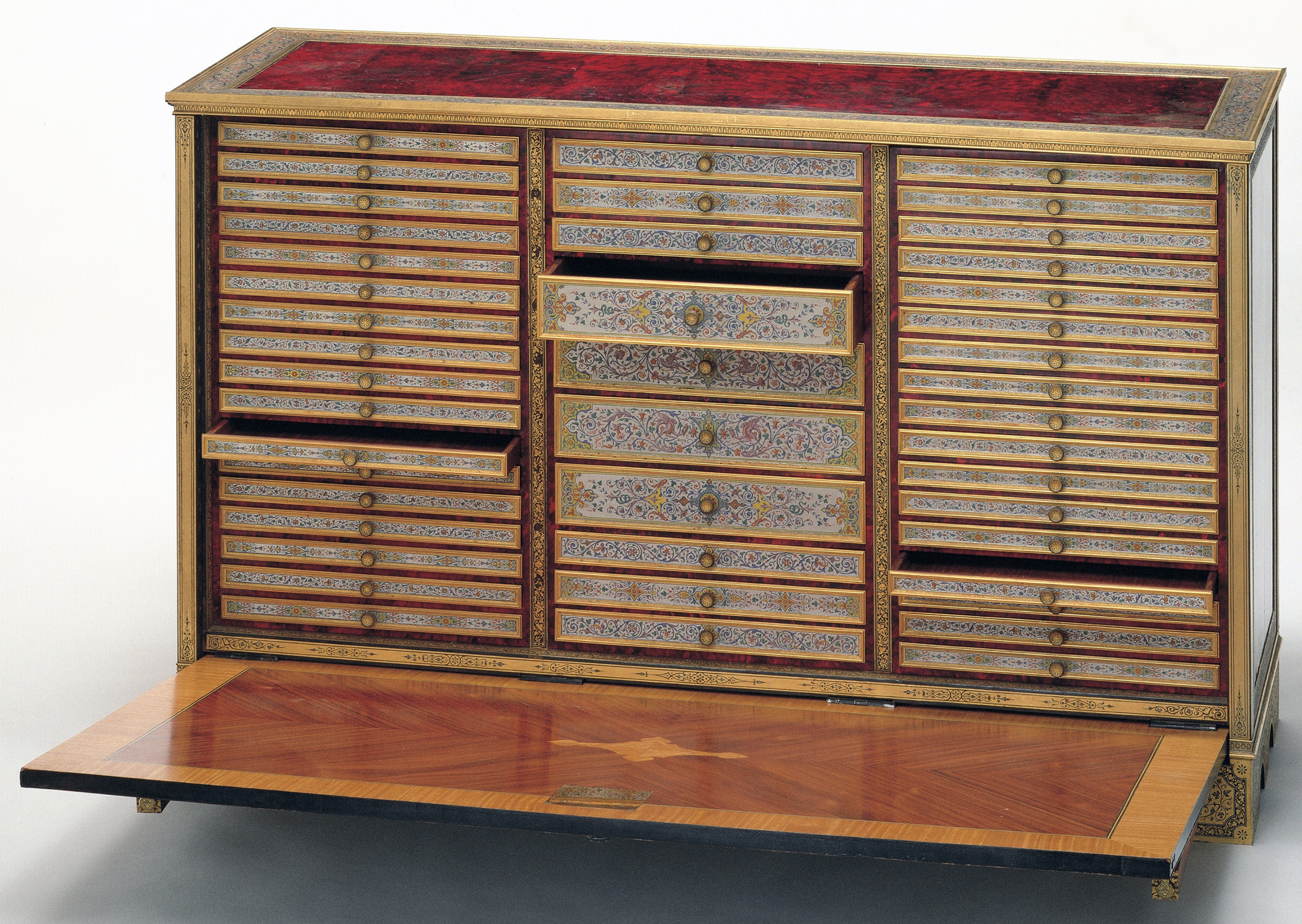
Writing or document desk by Plácido Zuloaga, 1884–1885

Many works in the collection are from the workshop of Plácido Zuloaga, one of a family of artists based in Eibar, Spain. Zuloaga's art won many awards in national and international expositions. He was known for elaborate damascened artworks, each requiring the skills of eight to twelve specialist artisans over a period of years. Many of these pieces were commissioned by the English collector Alfred Morrison. Twenty-two works in the collection are signed by Zuloaga. These include an intricately decorated forged iron cassone, 201 centimetres (79 in) wide, that has become known as the Fonthill Casket after Morrison's residence, Fonthill Manor in Wiltshire. Also commissioned by Morrison are a pair of amphora-shaped urns, 108 centimetres (43 in) high, from 1878 whose style imitated the medieval Alhambra vases. Covered in intricate Hispano-Arabic decoration, possibly drawn from contemporary engravings of a specific Alhambra vase, these were exhibited in Paris before delivery to Morrison.

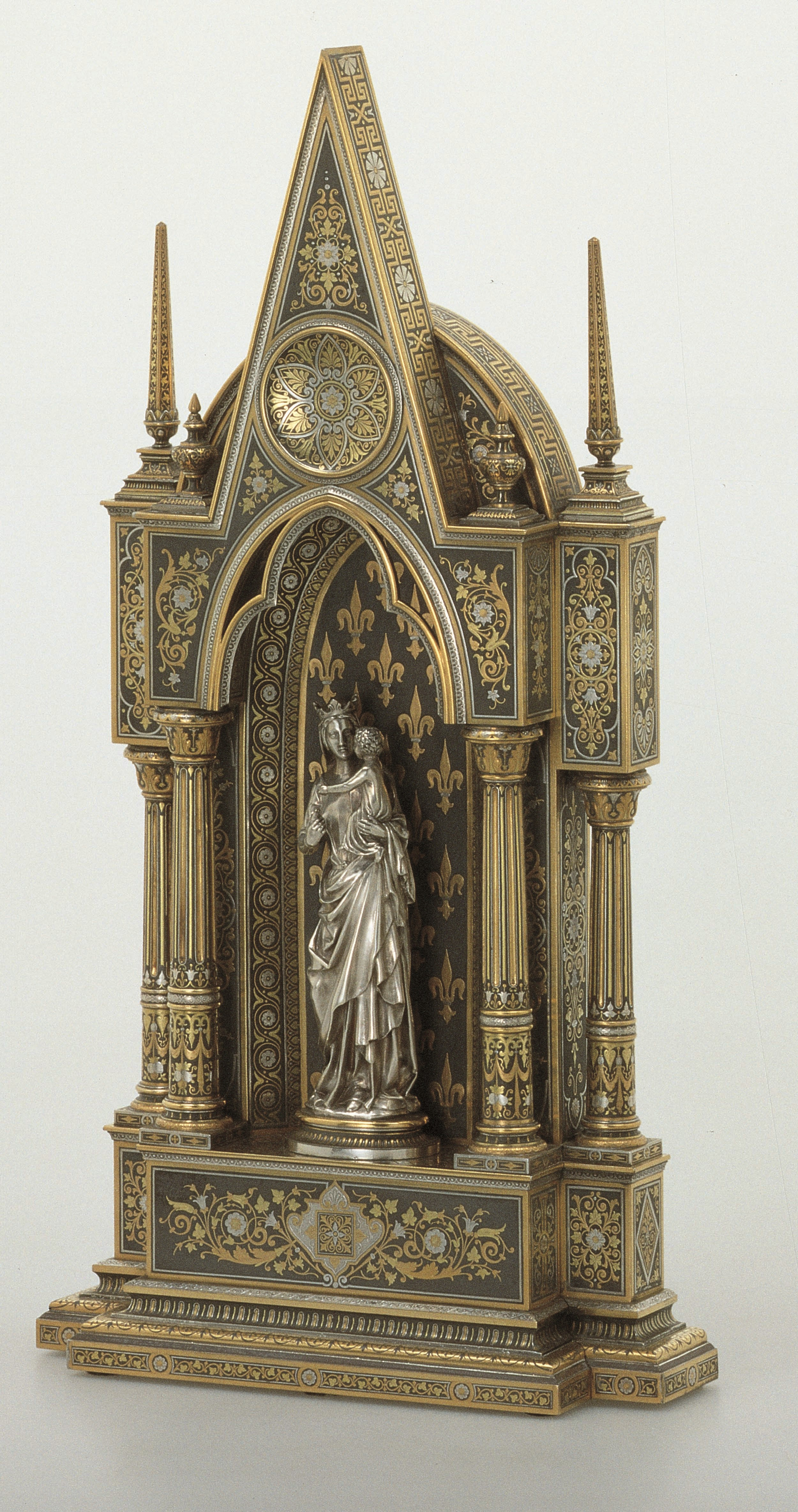
Iron shrine with virgin and child, 1880

A writing desk dated 1884–1885 has 44 drawers in a wooden case, each with enamelled floral patterns and a damascened metal button-pull. Not a woodworker himself, Zuloaga would have subcontracted out the preparation of the wood and veneer. A 47.3-centimetre-high (18.6 in) iron shrine dated 1880 recalls Gothic architecture in its overall shape, but the intricate damascened decoration is more suggestive of Art Nouveau. It contains a cast silver figure of the Virgin and Child in a Gothic style. Other items bearing the signature of Plácido Zuloaga include vases, urns, snuff boxes and caskets, all combining gold and silver damascening on forged iron. Unlike his father, Plácido did not manufacture arms. However, he occasionally applied damascening to guns produced elsewhere. One such revolver, of a design pioneered by the French gunsmith Casimir Lefaucheux, is in the collection. Brooches also with Zuloaga's signature depict the Arms of Mexico and a farmyard scene. An ivory snuff box combines the monogram of Carlos, Duke of Madrid with the symbol of the House of Bourbon. It was likely produced when the Basque country was occupied by Carlos' army during the Third Carlist War.

The collection includes other objects from Eibar, from artists who likely trained with Zuloaga and then established their own workshops. Alongside urns, vases, cigarette boxes, and other containers, these include mirror frames, bracelets, and handles for parasols, a cane, and umbrellas. A cased rifle and bayonet was presented by the Basque government to Prince of Asturias Jaime de Borbón y de Borbón-Parma, then six years old, who was a pretender to the thrones of Spain and of France.

=== Works from Toledo ===
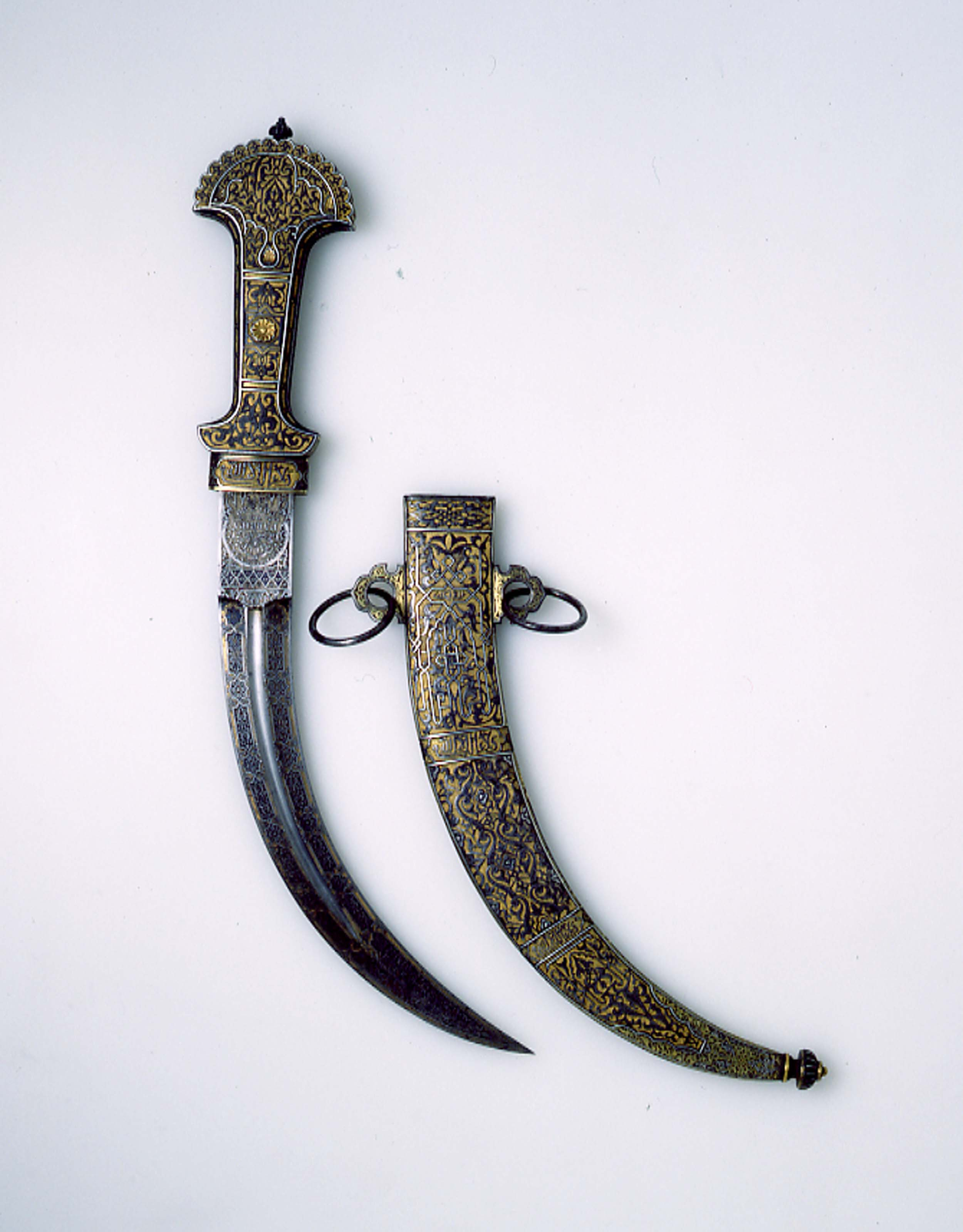
Cased jambiya dagger with sheath from Toledo, 1877

Nineteen works in the collection are from Toledo, which has its own tradition of damascening, having been the location of an Artillery Factory (formerly the Royal Sword Factory). These include a janbiya dagger with sheath in a Moroccan style, dated 1877, which was presented to King Alfonso XII by the Artillery Factory. Some of the works from Toledo are domed caskets which show an influence of Zuloaga's Fonthill Casket. One of these contains the visiting card of Victoria Eugenie of Battenberg, Queen consort of Spain. Another casket illustrates scenes from the story of Don Quixote and a bust of its author, Miguel de Cervantes. An artist represented in the collection is Linares of Toledo, who exhibited at a world's fair in New York in the 1930s. His cigarette case uses two colours of gold to depict mythical creatures. A 28-centimetre (11 in) high commemorative plaque from around 1883 combines mythic symbolism with illustrations of the telegraph and other uses of electricity, and was likely an award given to a member of the Telegraph Corps.

=== Other works ===
Two works in the collection come from outside Spain, including a hunting sword with scabbard from mid-nineteenth century France signed by a Henry Dufresne. A casket from Vicenza, Italy, is signed by Antonio Cortelazzo (1819–1903), an artist who was influenced by Plácido Zuloaga, having seen Morrison's collection in the 1870s.

== Exhibitions ==
Although the collection is not on permanent public display, the following exhibitions have featured works from the collection:

Plácido Zuloaga: Spanish Treasures from The Khalili Collection

- May 1997 – January 1998 Victoria and Albert Museum, London, UK

El Arte y Tradición de los Zuloaga: Damasquinado Español de la Colección Khalili

- May – August 2000 Museo de Bellas Artes, Bilbao, Spain
- February – April 2001 Alhambra Palace, Granada, Spain
- May – September 2001 Real Fundacion de Toledo, Toledo, Spain

Plácido Zuloaga: Meisterwerke in gold, silber und eisen damaszener–schmiedekunst aus der Khalili-Sammlung

- April – August 2003 Roemer und Pelizaeus Museum, Hildesheim, Germany

Metal Magic: Spanish Treasures from the Khalili Collection

- November 2011 – April 2012 Auberge de Provence, Valletta, Malta

Alan Borg, when Director of the Victoria and Albert Museum, described the collection's catalogue as "a landmark in the study of nineteenth-century Spanish decorative art".

== Gallery ==
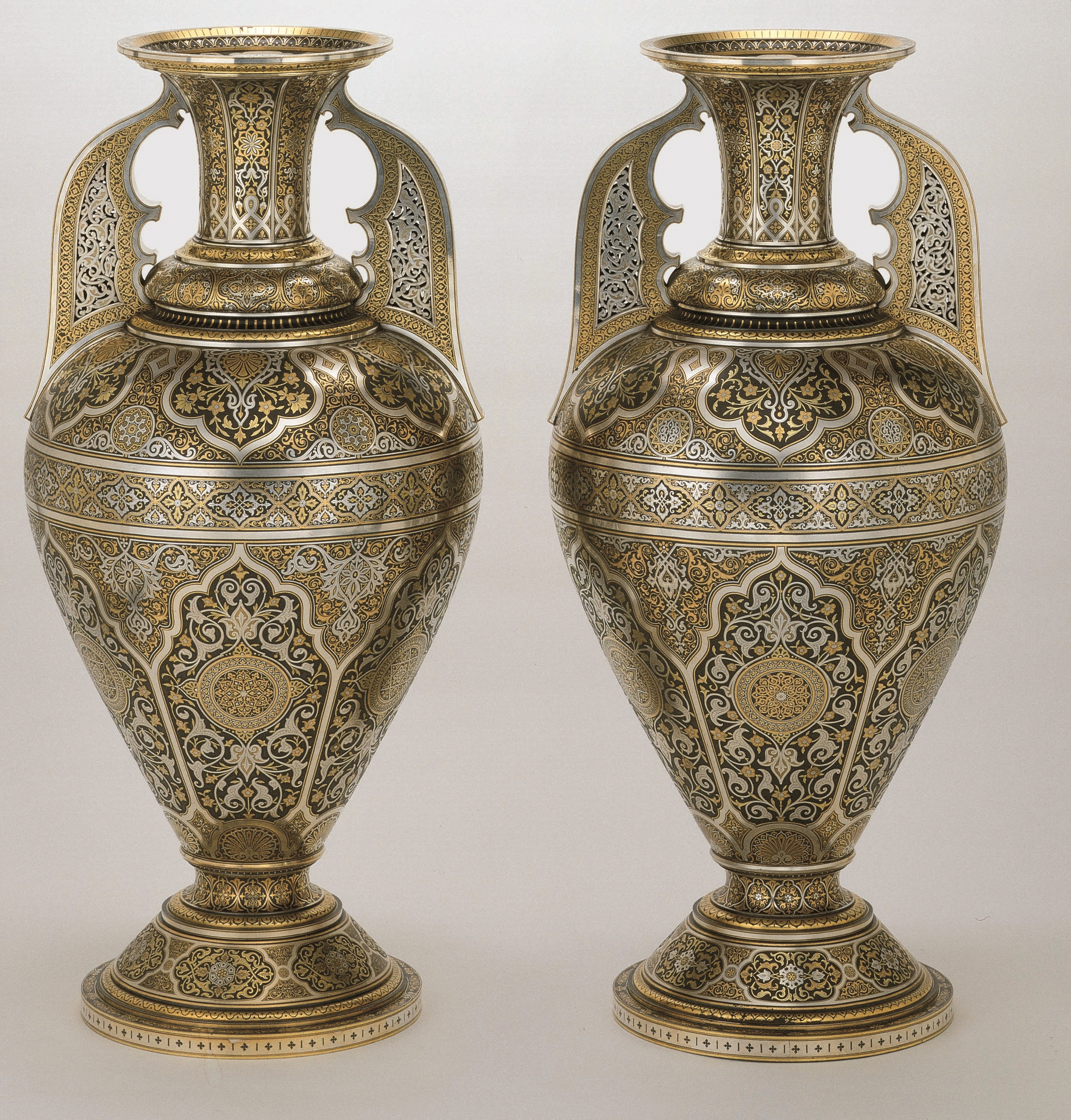
Pair of iron urns by Plácido Zuloaga, before 1878

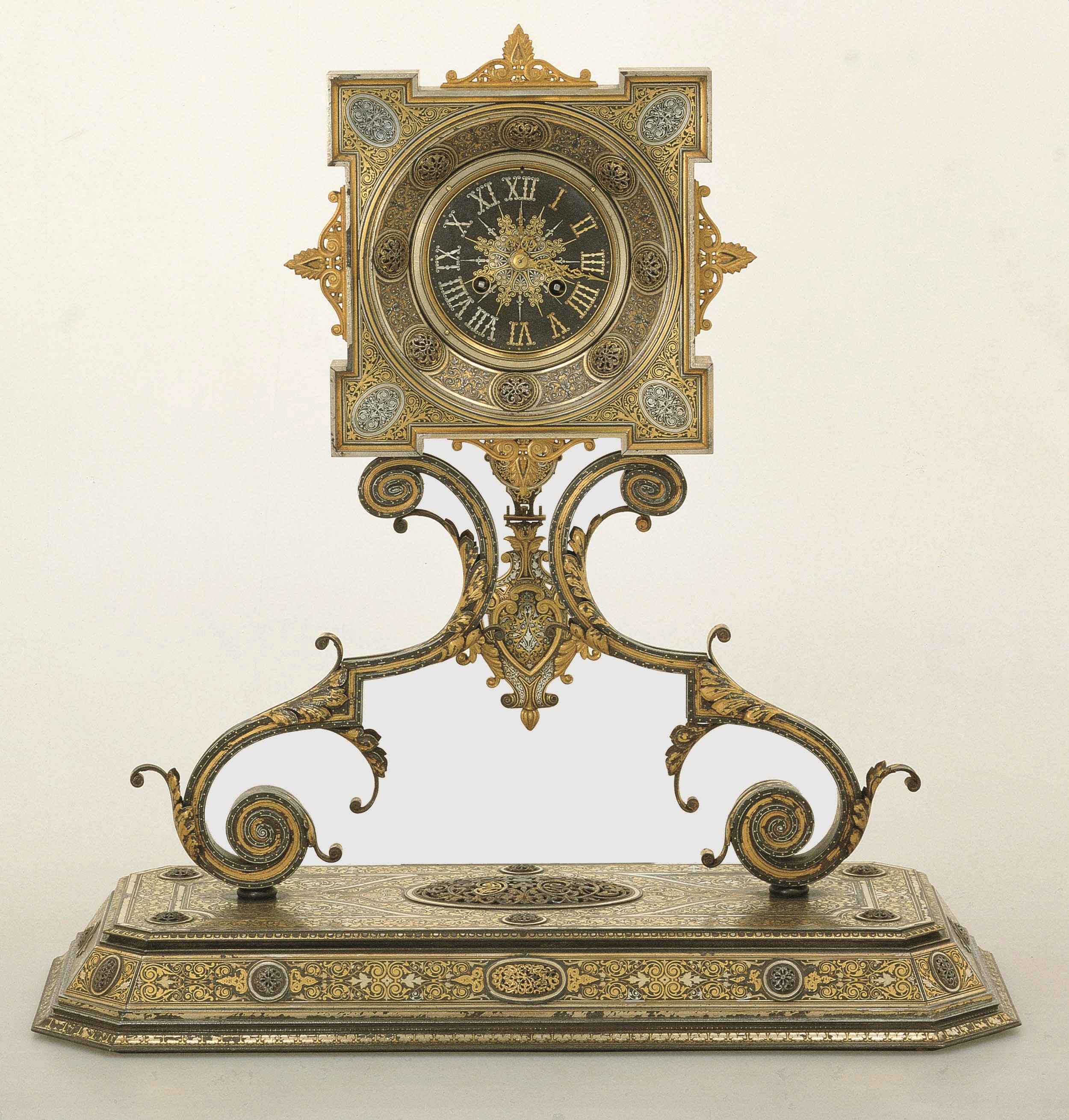
Iron table clock by Plácido Zuloaga, circa 1880

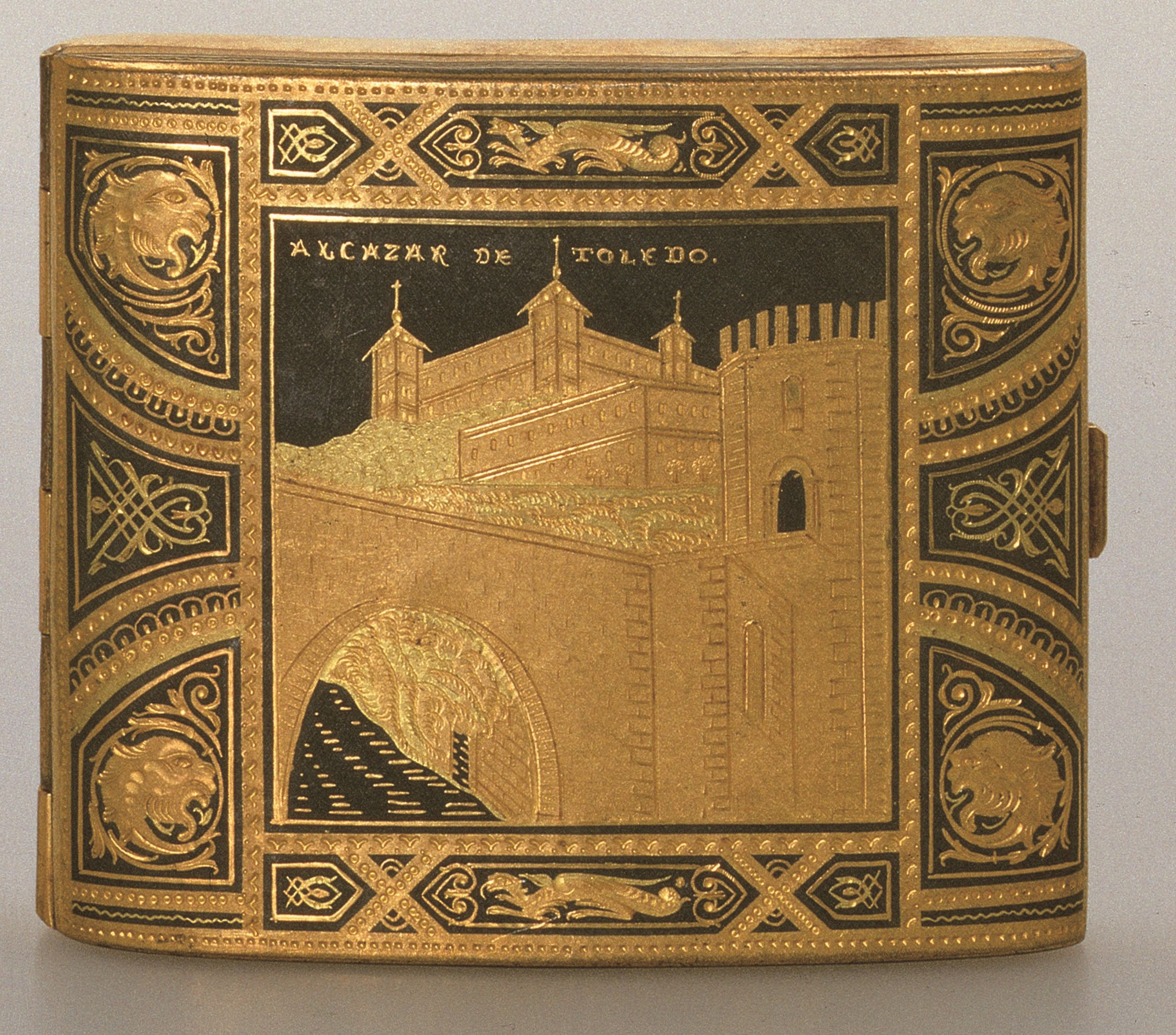
Cigarette case depicting the Alcázar palace of Toledo, early 20th century

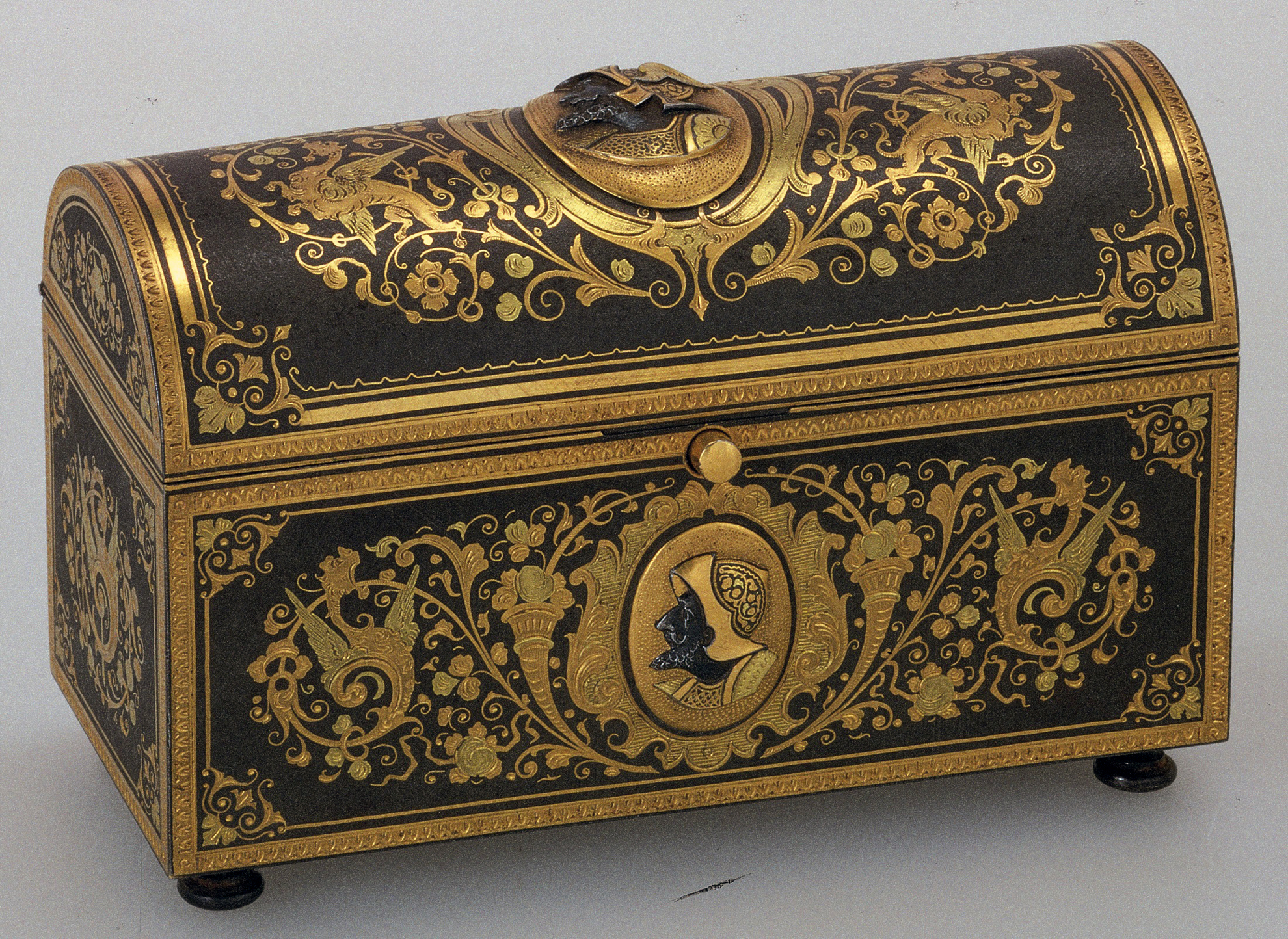
Domed and footed box presented by Victoria Eugenie of Battenberg, Toledo, circa 1918
