= Alfred Morrison =

English politician and collector (1821–1897)

Alfred Morrison (1821 – 22 December 1897) was an English politician and collector, known for his interest in works of art, autographs and manuscripts. He was High Sheriff of Wiltshire.

== Early life ==
Morrison was born in 1821. He was the second son of James Morrison (1790–1857), the textile businessman. He went to the University of Edinburgh, and spent a student year at Trinity College, Cambridge and travelled.

== Career ==
When his father died in 1857, Morrison inherited his father's large fortune. Morrison was High Sheriff of Wiltshire in 1857. He later unsuccessfully stood for parliament.

== Collections ==
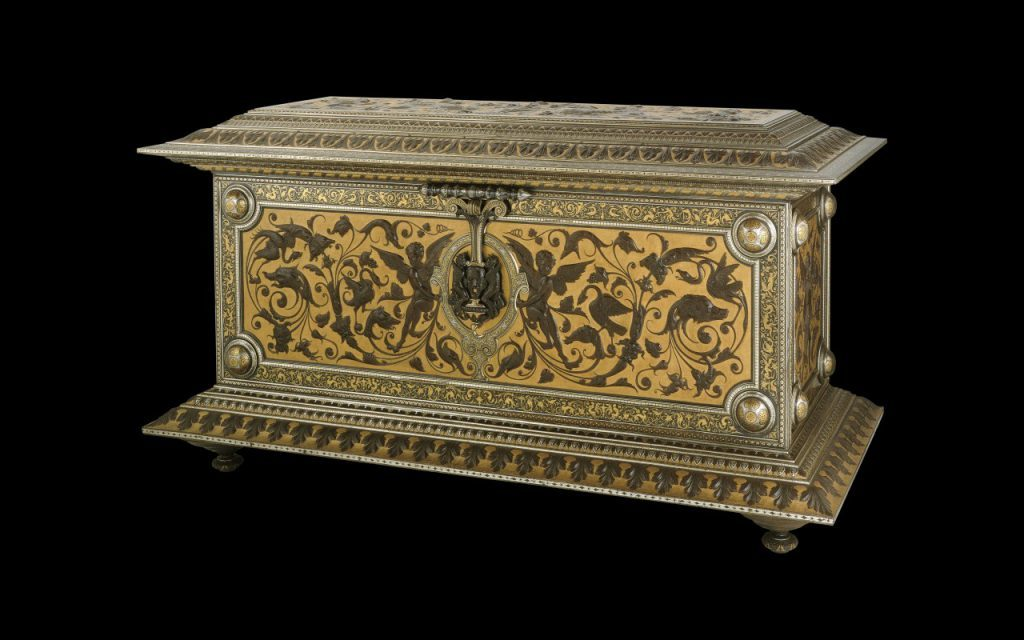
The "Fonthill Casket", an iron cassone, damascened with gold and silver: the first of Morrison's commissions from the Spanish metalworker Plácido Zuloaga

Morrison's houses at Fonthill and on Carlton House Terrace, Westminster, contained Persian carpets, Chinese porcelain, Greek gems and gold work, and miniatures. He employed craftsmen on cameo-cutting, inlaying of metals and enamelled glass. In 1868 he was contacted by Spanish metalworker Plácido Zuloaga, administrator of a factory that had lost royal commission. Over the next twenty years Morrison commissioned a variety of damascened art works from Zuloaga, who led a team of artisans in making elaborate art works almost exclusively for Morrison. These included a cassone which became known as the Fonthill Casket.

Between 1860 and 1878 Morrison formed a collection of engravings, of which a part was described in a printed Annotated Catalogue and Index to Portraits by M. Holloway (1868). His paintings included Clouet and Goya. The main interest of his later life was in autographs and letters, catalogued as:

- Catalogue of the Collection of Autograph Letters and Historical Documents formed between 1865 and 1882, compiled and annotated under the direction of A. W. Thibaudeau, printed for private circulation, 1883–92, 6 vols.
- Second series, 1882–93, 1893–6, A to D, 3 vols. This is without facsimiles but with more of the text of the documents.
- The Hamilton and Nelson Papers, 1756–1815, 1893–4, 2 vols.
- The Blessington Papers, 1896.
- The Bulstrode Papers, vol. i., 1667-76 [London, 1897].

The correspondence between Lord Nelson and Lady Hamilton was for the first time fully printed in his catalogue. The papers of Sir Richard Bulstrode, who died in 1711 at the age of 101, contain his newsletters which overlap with Pepys's Diary.

Many of the Spanish metalworks from Morrison's collection are now owned by the British-Iranian scholar, collector and philanthropist Nasser D. Khalili, forming the Khalili Collection of Spanish Damascene Metalwork.

== Personal life ==
In 1860, Morrison married Mabel Chermside. She was a daughter of the Rev. R. S. C. Chermside, rector of Wilton, Wiltshire. His wife survived him with two sons, Hugh and James Archibald, who were both Members of Parliament, and two daughters. Their daughter, Dorothy, married Stafford Harry Northcote, Viscount Saint Cyres. Another daughter married Stephen Herbert Gatty.

Morrison died at Fonthill Gifford, Wiltshire, on 22 December 1897, at the age of 76. He left a substantial estate valued for probate at £916,107, equivalent to £102,949,711 in 2025.
