= Sanctuary of Loyola =

Roman Catholic shrine in Azpeitia, Spain

Coordinates: 43°10′28.01″N 2°16′58″W

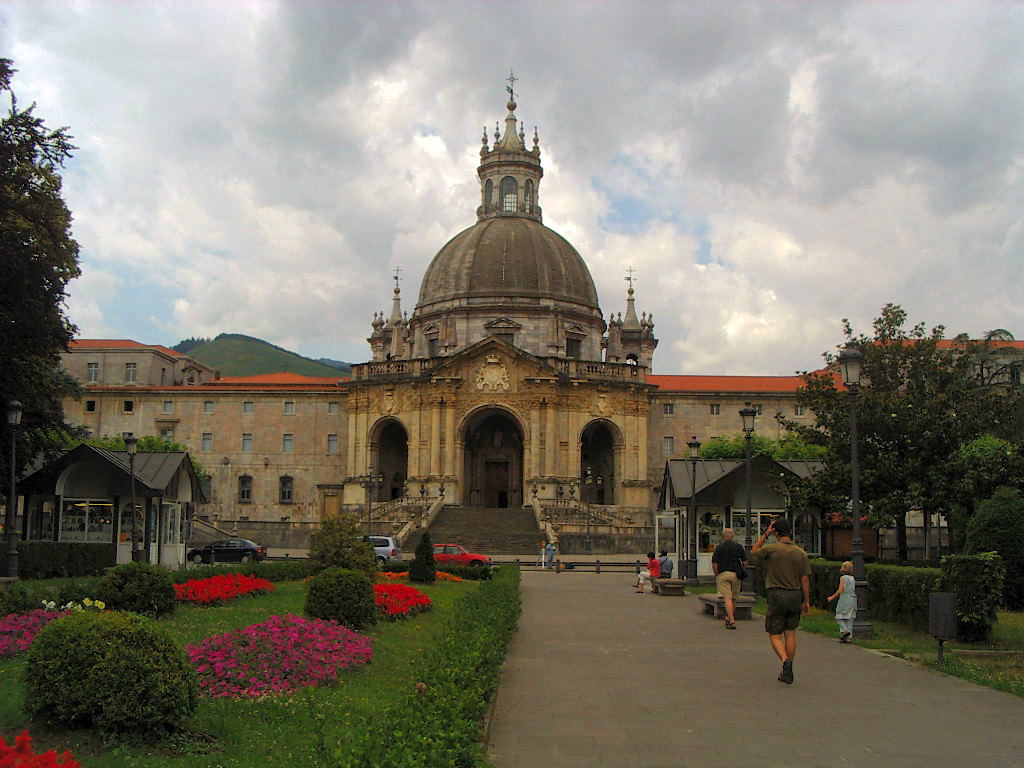
Sanctuary of Ignatius of Loyola, in Azpeitia

The Sanctuary of Loyola or Loiola (Spanish: Santuario de Loyola; Basque: Loiolako Santutegia), or the Shrine and Basilica of Loyola, consists of a series of edifices built in Churrigueresque Baroque style around the birthplace of St. Ignatius of Loyola, founder of the Society of Jesus.

The sanctuary stands along the river Urola at the neighbourhood of Loyola (Loiola, a place-name meaning 'foundry made of clay', or possibly 'hut made of clay') in the municipality of Azpeitia, Basque Country, Spain.

Ignatius of Loyola, whose real name was Iñigo López de Loyola, was the son of the Lord of Loyola, Beltrán Ibáñez de Oñaz and Marina Sánchez de Licona, member of an important Biscayan family. He was born in 1491 in his family house in Loyola.

After he died his birthplace became a place of veneration. In the seventeenth century the house where he was born was given to the Society of Jesus. The Order built there, near the birthplace of its founder, the Sanctuary of Loyola.

In 1900 the Society commissioned an altar for the sanctuary, employing metalwork artist Plácido Zuloaga, who had won international success creating intricate artworks by damascening, a technique which inlays gold and silver into iron. Zuloaga's iron structure houses panels depicting the life of St. Ignatius, and supports a damascened crucifix and candlesticks from the workshop of José Felipe Artamendi.

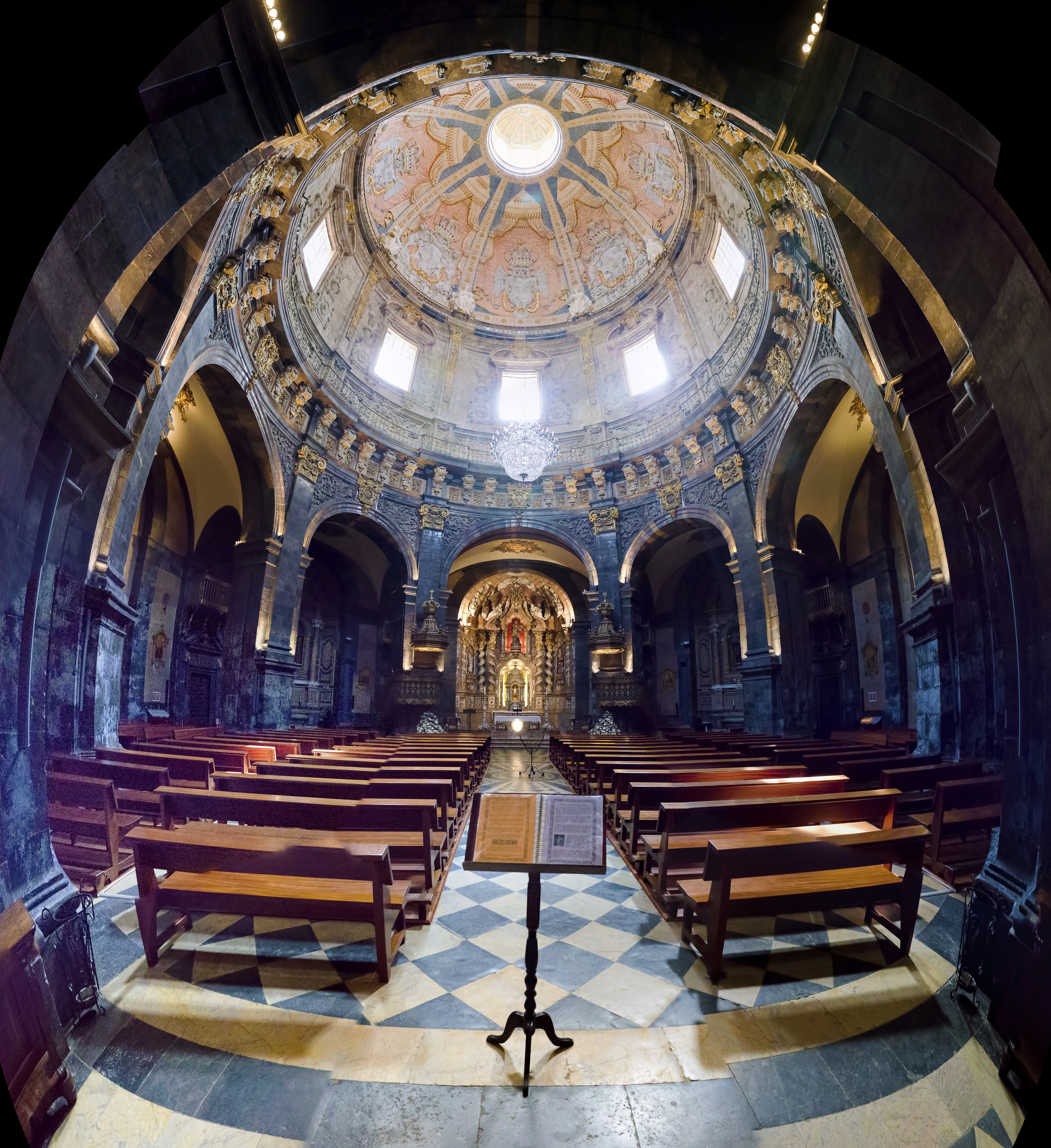
Interior

== Gallery ==
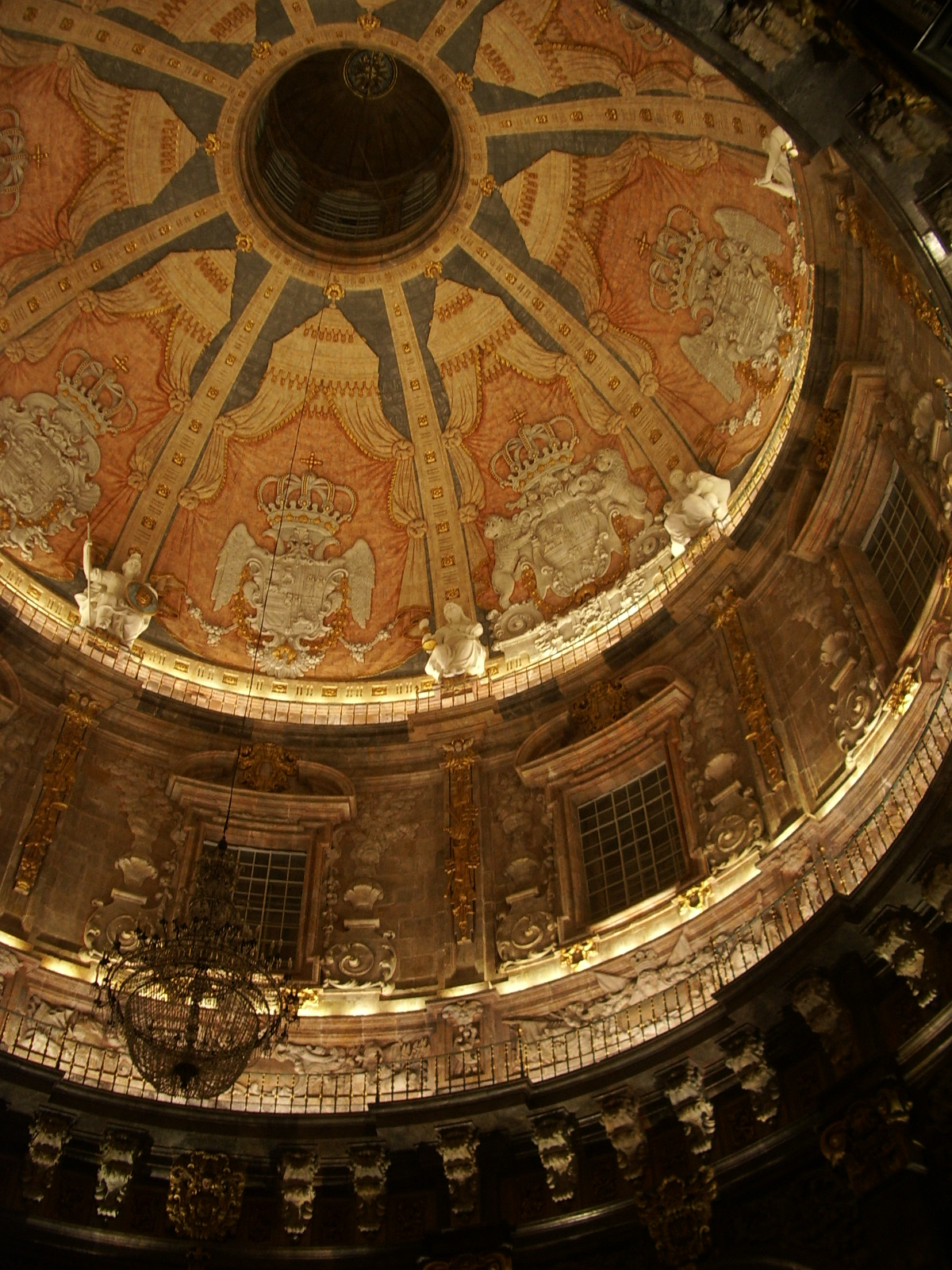
Internal view of the dome

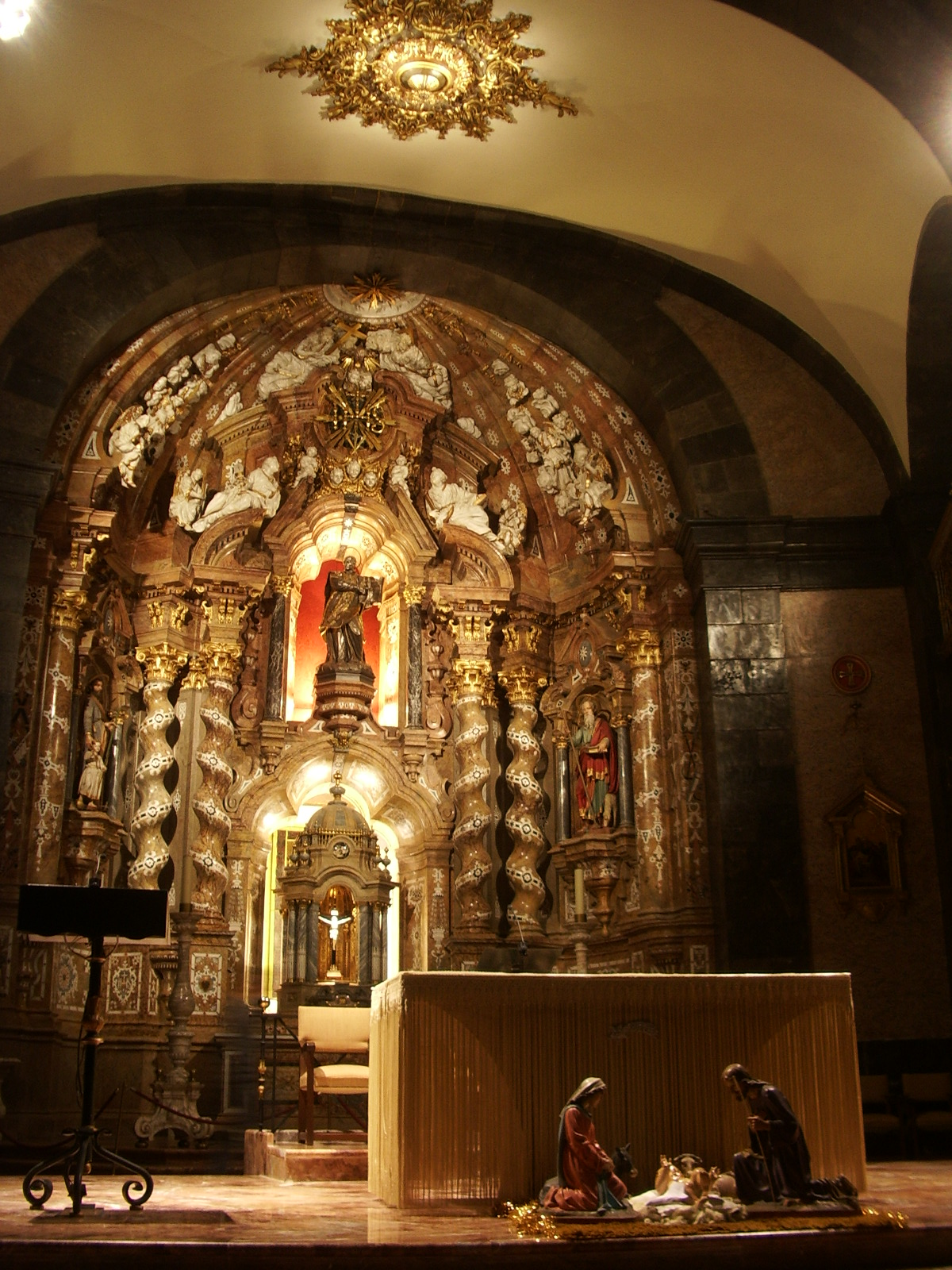
The main altar

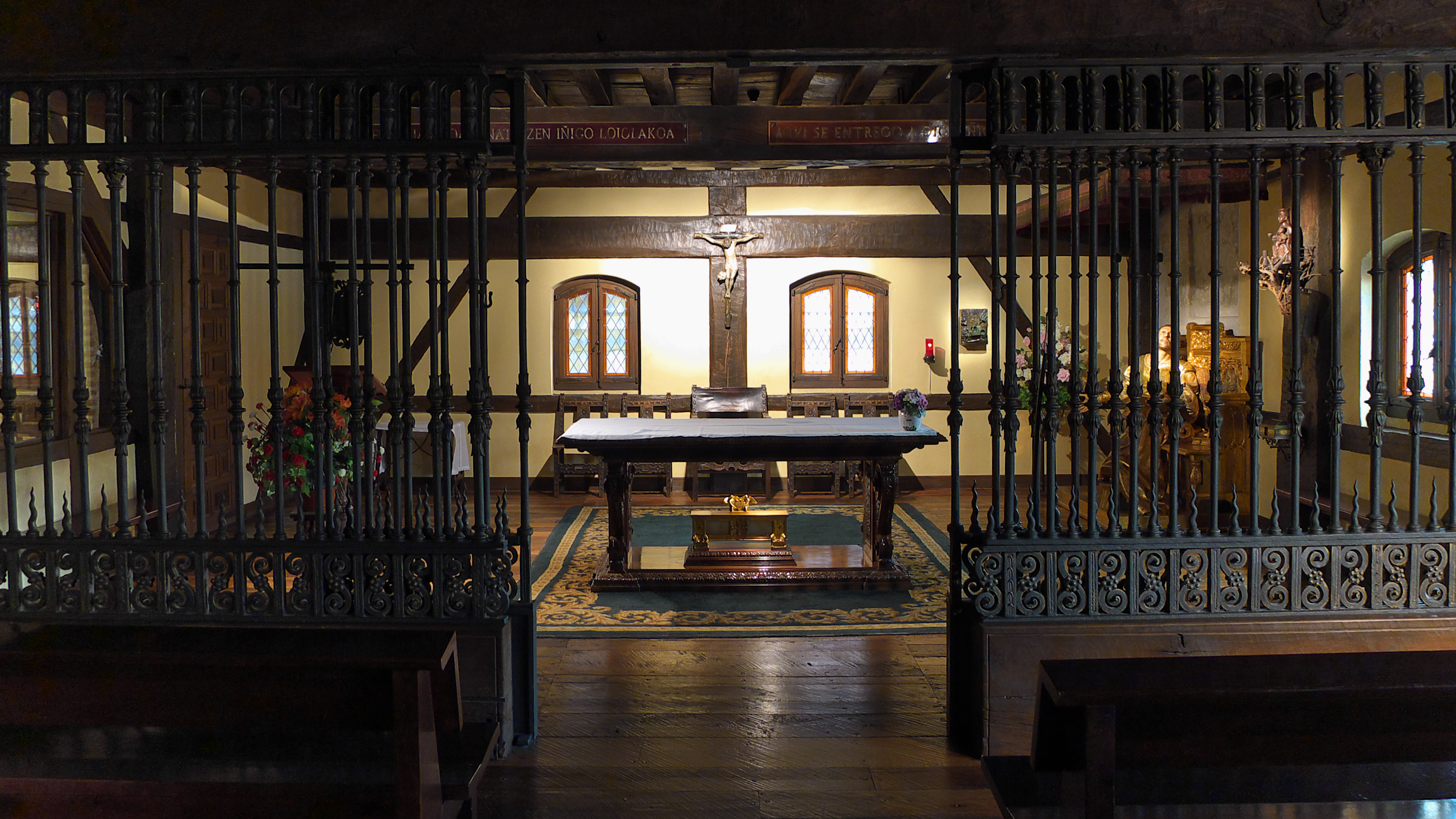
Interior view

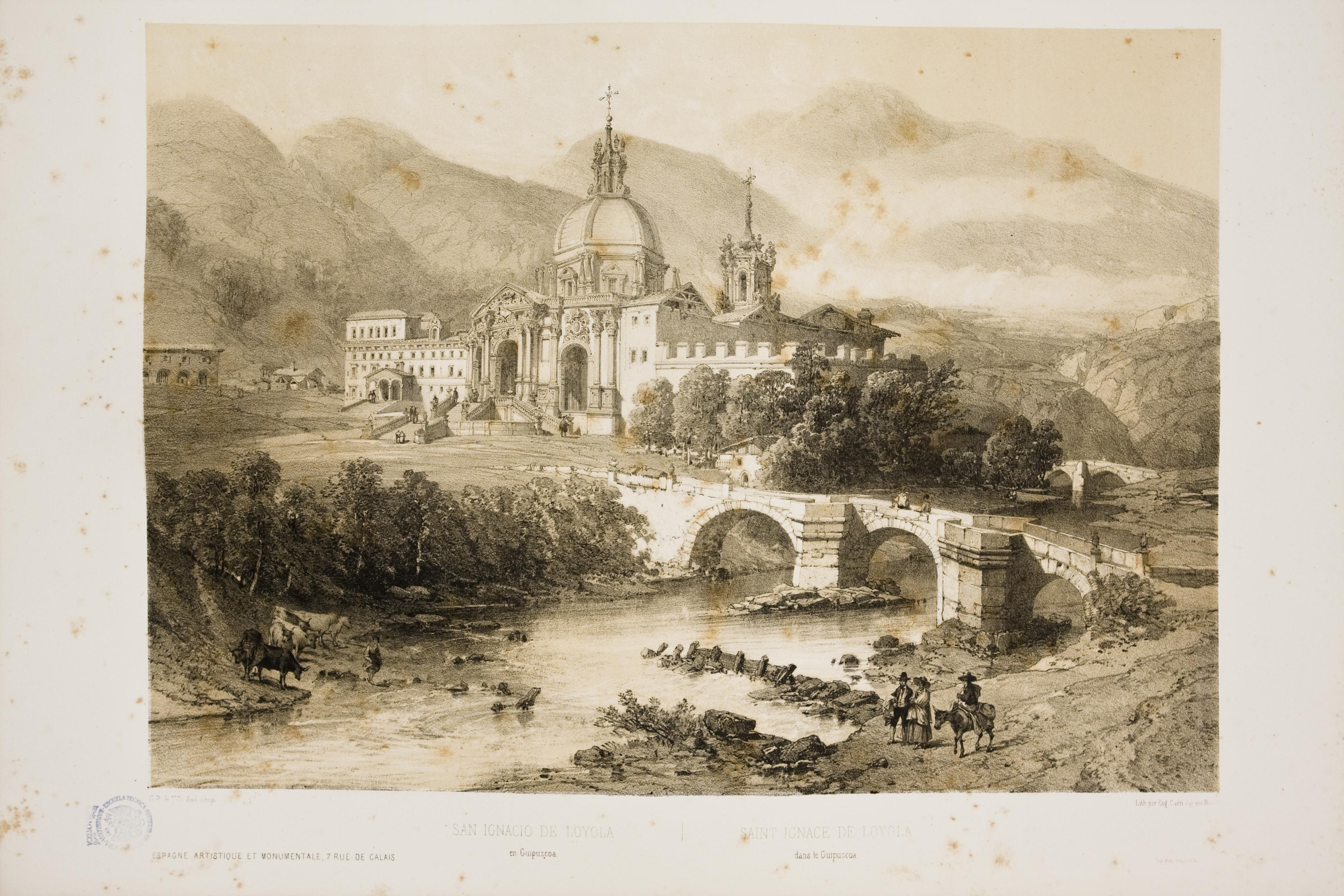
Sanctuary of Loyola in Gipuzkoa by Jenaro Pérez Villaamil and Eugène Cicéri in 1850, in España artística y monumental

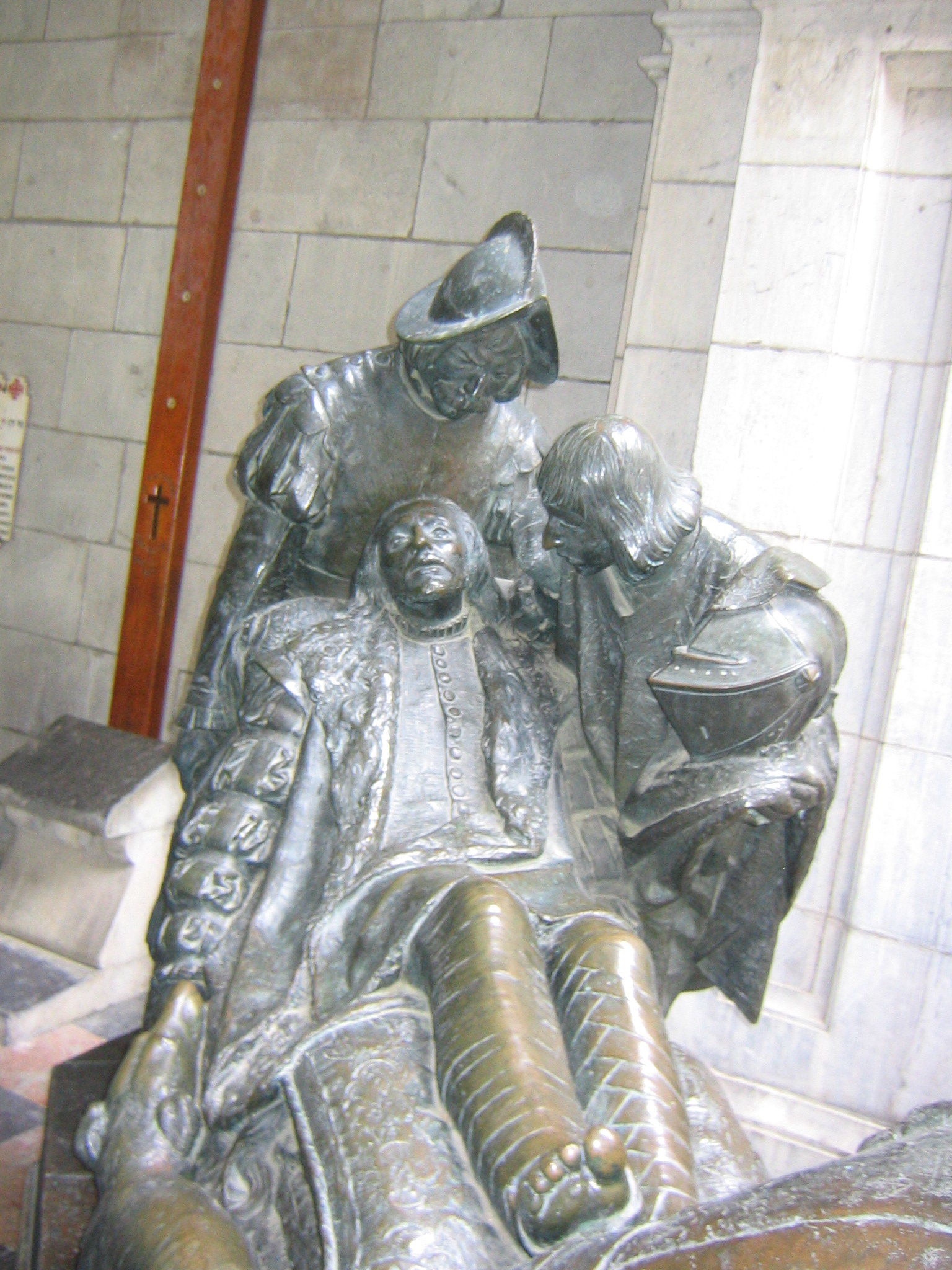
Ignatius of Loyola depicted wounded in Pamplona

== See also ==
- List of Jesuit sites
- 18th-century Western domes
