= Alan Borg =

Director of the Victoria and Albert Museum

Alan Charles Nelson Borg CBE KStJ FSA FRHistS (born 21 January 1942) is a British historian. He is a former director of the Victoria and Albert Museum and librarian of the Order of St John.

== Early life ==
Borg was born to Charles John Nelson Borg and Frances Mary Olive Hughes.

He was educated at Westminster School, where he remains an active director and trustee of the Westminster School Society. From Westminster he went up to Brasenose College, University of Oxford, where he was awarded MA. Postgraduate studies took him to the Courtauld Institute of Art. His doctorate thesis was 'Architectural Decoration of the Romanesque Period in Provence', for which he was awarded a PhD in 1970. A book based on it was published in 1972.

== Career ==
After academic work in various higher educational institutions in France and the USA Borg returned to London. Curatorship became central to his work, when in 1970, on his return from the United States, he took up the post of Assistant Keeper at the Tower of London's Royal Armouries, a post he held until 1978. His next appointment was that of Keeper at the Sainsbury Centre for the Visual Arts at the University of East Anglia. Borg's move into museum management came in 1982 when he was appointed Director-General of the Imperial War Museum, London. In 1995 Borg was appointed Director of the Victoria and Albert Museum, serving in this post until 2001. In 2010 he became a Visiting Professor at the University of Reading.

=== Photography ===
Photographs attributed to Borg are held in the Conway Library at the Courtauld Institute of Art. The collection contains glass and film negatives as well as prints principally of architecture and sculpture.

=== Membership of boards and committees ===
Borg was a member of a number of committees and boards throughout his career, including:

- Board of Management, The Courtauld Institute of Art, 1998-2002
- Trustee, Foundling Museum, 1998-2010
- Governor, Thomas Coram Foundation for Children, 1995-2005
- Order of St John Librarian and a Vice-President of the Foundling Museum.

== Awards ==
- Fellow of the Society of Antiquaries London
- Knight of the Order of St. John
- Appointed Commander of the Order of the British Empire (CBE) in the 1991 Birthday Honours

== Selected written works ==
- Borg, Alan (1972) Architectural Sculptures in Romanesque Provence, Clarendon Press, Oxford ISBN 9780198171928
- Borg, Alan (1979) Arms and Armour in Britain, HMSO, London ISBN 9780116705761
- Borg, Alan (1991) War Memorials: From Antiquity to the Present, Leo Cooper London ISBN 9780850523638
- Coke, David and Borg, Alan (2011) Vauxhaul Gardens: A History, Yale University Press, London ISBN 9780300173826
- Borg, Alan (2005) The History of the Worshipful Company of Painters, Otherwise Painter-stainers, Jeremy Mills, Huddersfield ISBN 9781905217052

== Personal life ==
In 1964, Borg married Anne Blackmore in Totnes, Devon. The couple were later divorced and in 1976 he married Caroline Sylvia Hill In Chelsea, London.
