= Eusebio Zuloaga =

Spanish gunsmith (1808–1898)

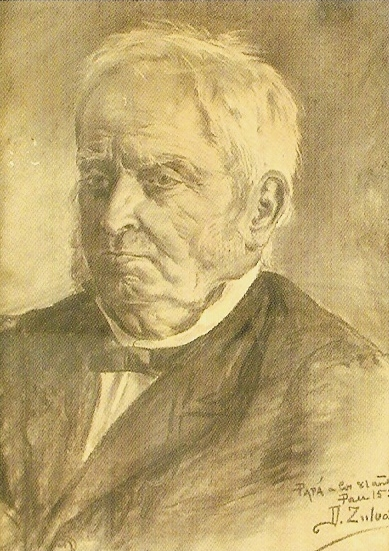
- Portrait of Eusebio Zuloaga, pencil on paper drawing by his son Daniel Zuloaga, in 1899
- Born: Eusebio Zuloaga González; 15 December 1808; Madrid
- Died: 1898 (aged 89–90); Deusto, Bilbao
- Known for: Damascening
- Relatives: Daniel Zuloaga (son), Plácido Zuloaga (son), Ignacio Zuloaga (grandson)

Eusebio Zuloaga González (15 December 1808 in Madrid – 1898 in Deusto, Bilbao), was a Spanish gunsmith. He is considered the initiator of the art of modern damascening. He was the first Spanish artist who achieved an international reputation, participating in the first international exhibition, The Great Exhibition in London in 1851. He received several awards in Spain, England, France, and Belgium. Zuloaga was director of the Royal Armoury of Madrid. Zuloaga served as head of the Royal Factory of La Moncloa.

Born in Madrid in 1808, he was the son of an Eibar gunsmith, Blas de Zuloaga, and his wife, Gabriela González. His father was a teacher at the Reales Fábricas de Armas de Placencia in the late eighteenth century.

Zuloaga married Ramona Boneta, a specialist in electroplating. They had three sons, who were artists dedicated to painting, ceramics and metal. Daniel Zuloaga was considered to be one of the innovators of ceramic arts in Spain; his work was continued by his children Candida, Esperanza, Theodora and John. Guillermo Zuloaga worked in the shadow of his brother Daniel. Plácido Zuloaga, a damascening expert, was father of the painter Ignacio Zuloaga.
