= Daniel Zuloaga =

Spanish ceramicist and painter (1852–1921)

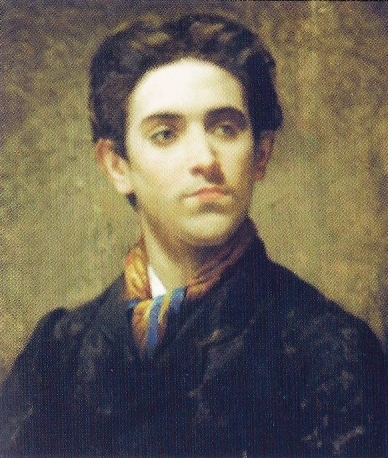
- Daniel Zuloaga; portrait by Ignacio Suárez Llanos (1830-1881)
- Born: Daniel Zuloaga y Boneta; 1852
- Died: 21 December 1921; Segovia, Spain
- Known for: Ceramics, painting
- Relatives: Eusebio Zuloaga (father), Plácido Zuloaga (half-brother), Ignacio Zuloaga (nephew)

Daniel Zuloaga y Boneta (1852 – December 27, 1921) was a Spanish ceramist and painter. He is considered to be one of the innovators of art pottery in Spain. He worked primarily from his workshops in Madrid and Segovia, but his work extended throughout Spain. He participated in various international exhibitions, and his pieces can be found in other European countries. His work was characterized by using ancient techniques. Through the influence of his father, Zuloaga worked in his youth at the Royal Palace of Madrid. After training in France, Zuloaga and his brothers opened their first shop in the Real Fábrica de La Moncloa, its most representative work being the facades of the Palacio de Velázquez. His other works can be seen at the Palacio de Cristal and the Hospital of Maudes, among many others.

He introduced Ceramic arts in Spain and also set up a school with intent to promote “traditional techniques and introduce styles such as neo-Renaissance and modernism to European fashion.

== Biography ==
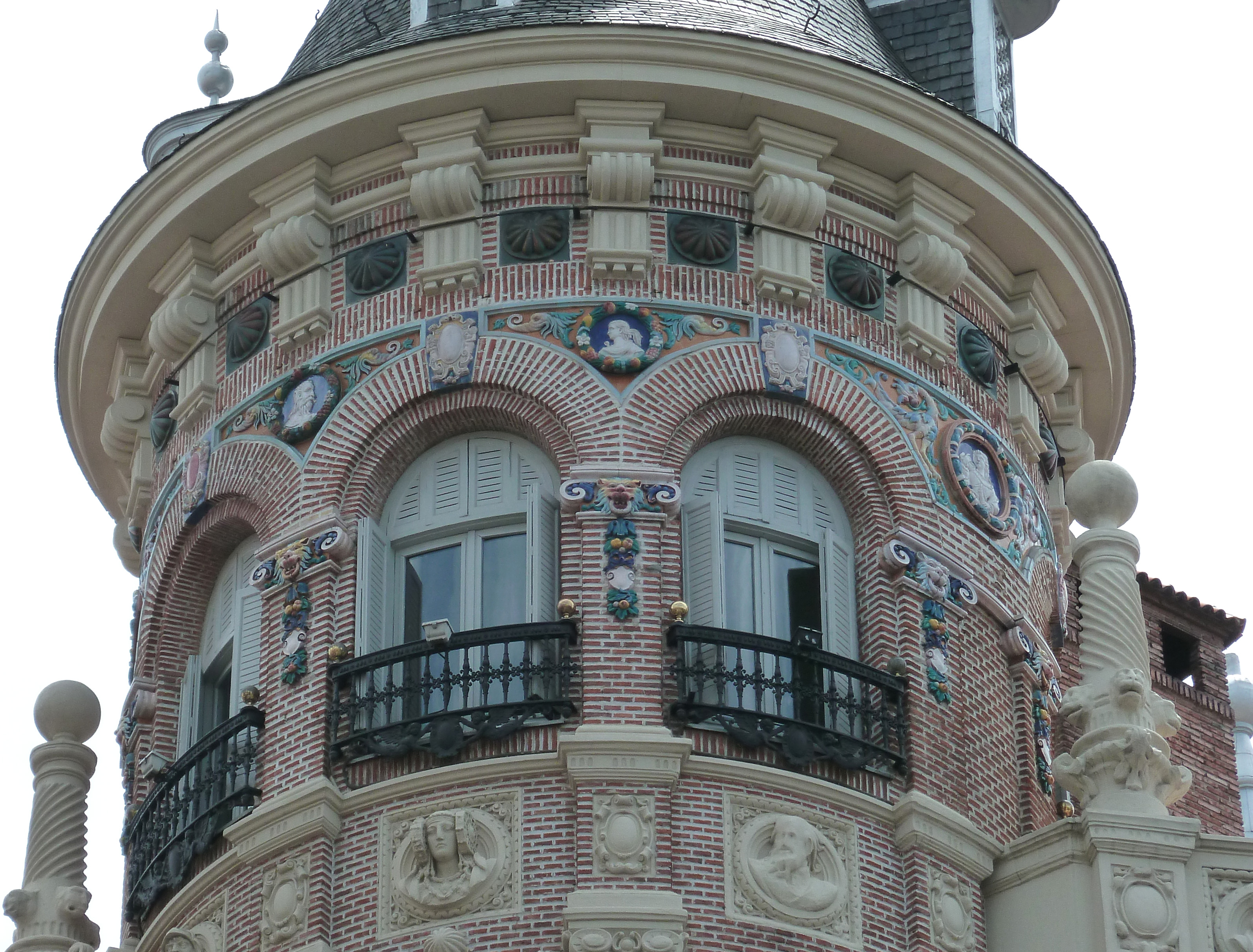
Detail of Casa de Don Tomás de Allende ("Don Tomás de Allende's House") at Plaza de Canalejas (square) in Madrid. Ceramic decoration was made by Daniel Zuloaga

Daniel Zuloaga was born in 1852 into a family of artists who specialized in metal work. In the initial years of his life, he was trained by his family in these skills, particularly by his father Eusebio Zuloaga who was director of the Royal Armoury and specialist in damascene (metal inlay work), and his brother-in-law (sister’s husband) Ignacio Suárez Llanos who was a well-known painter. He was the half-brother of Plácido Zuloaga who took over the family workshop from his father. He went to school of ceramics in Sèvres, France to specialize in the ceramic arts. On his return to Spain, he joined the Royal Factory in Moncloa.

His first major assignment was tile work for the Exposición Nacional de Minería of 1883 in Madrid, decorating Ricardo Velázquez Bosco's Palacio de Velázquez. He associated with Velázquez professionally and worked in his team on many projects in Madrid, Segovia and Guipúzcoa. He also participated in international exhibitions..

His nephew was the renowned painter Ignacio Zuloaga. One particular aspect of Ignacio's paintings was that he painted his uncle and his entire family again and again and displayed the paintings, portraying them in Spanish gypsy life, in many parts of the world. One of his famous paintings is that of his uncle and his family portrayed in national costume in the backdrop of Spanish natural scenery and titled “My Uncle Daniel and his family”. This painting is displayed in the Boston Museum of Fine Arts.

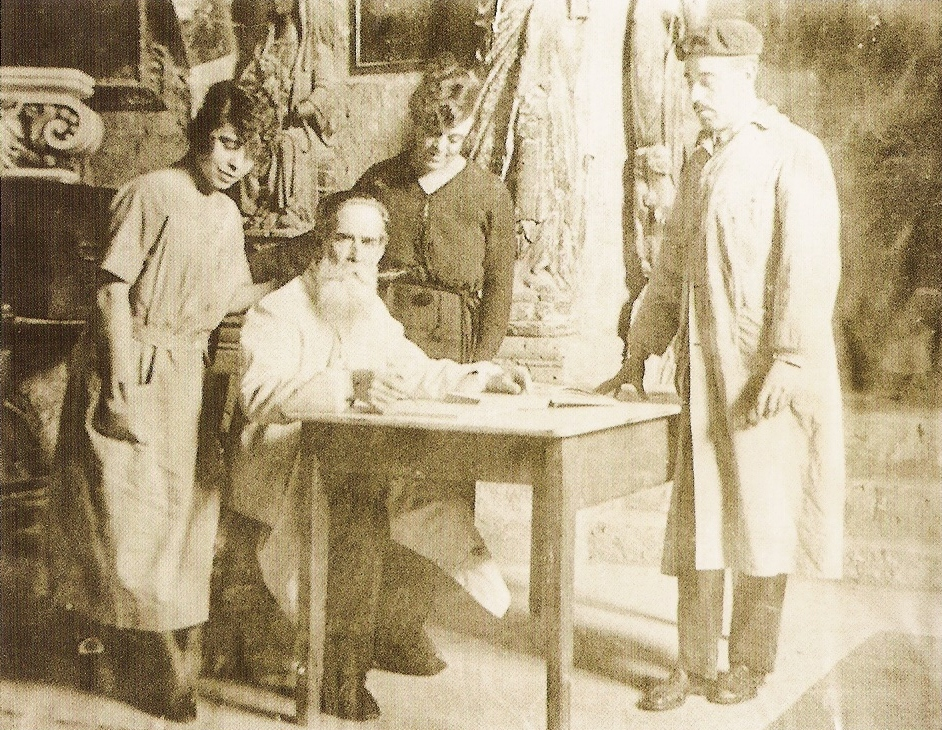
Zuloaga (seated) with his three children, Esperanza, Teodora and Juan.

In his old age, Daniel Zuloaga grew a white beard, resembling a saint. He was very well known in Spain for his rich contribution to ceramic arts and also introducing coloured tiles, which depicted Castilian rural life. His children helped him in the art work, with Esperanza, one of his two gifted daughters helping him in colouring. While his pottery works are seen in all parts of Spain, the ceramics works are particularly conspicuous in many famous churches and in the passages of Seville.

In 1905, Zuloaga purchased the Church of San Juan de los Caballeros in Segovia, which he converted into his workshop. The design shop was housed in the vestry. In another chamber of the church he applied colours on the baked works before carrying out glazing. The furnaces or hornos, which were fired with wood or charcoal, were kept in the nave. Another wing of the church was the storehouse for the materials for his art works, such as “old missals, lecterns, parchments and chairs”. He died in Segovia in 1921 at the age of 71.

== Bibliography ==
- RUBIO CELADA, Abraham (1999). "Innovaciones, técnicas, estilísticas y temática en la cerámica de los Zuloaga". Boletín de la Sociedad Española de Cerámica y Vidrio 8 (4, julio-agosto) (in Spanish)
- RUBIO CELADA, Abraham (2004). "De la tradición a la modernidad: los Zuloaga ceramistas". Madrid: Memoria para optar al grado de doctor (Universidad Complutense de Madrid). ISBN 84-669-2579-1 (in Spanish)
- RUBIO CELADA, Abraham (2004). "Cerámicas modernistas de Daniel Zuloaga en Donostia-San Sebastián". Ondarre (23). pp. 455–464 (in Spanish)
- RUBIO CELADA, Abraham (2004). "Cerámicas de estilo modernista diseñadas por Daniel Zuloaga en la fábrica de loza La Segoviana (1893-1906)". Actas del IX Congreso Annual de la Asociación de Ceramología (Tradición y modernidad: la cerámica en el modernismo). pp. 295–314 (in Spanish)
- RUBIO CELADA, Abraham y ESCORIAL PINELA, Ángel (2007). Los Zuloaga, artistas de la cerámica. Madrid: Editorial de Caja Segovia. ISBN 978-84-96145-78-8 (in Spanish)
- MARTÍN, José Luis (1992). La escultura segoviana. Segovia. ISBN 84-606-0909-X (in Spanish)
- DA ROCHA ARANDA, Oscar y MUÑOZ FAJARDO, Ricardo (2007). Madrid modernista: guía de arquitectura. Editorial Tebar. ISBN 978-84-00-08534-6 (in Spanish)
