= Damascening =

Art of inlaying metals

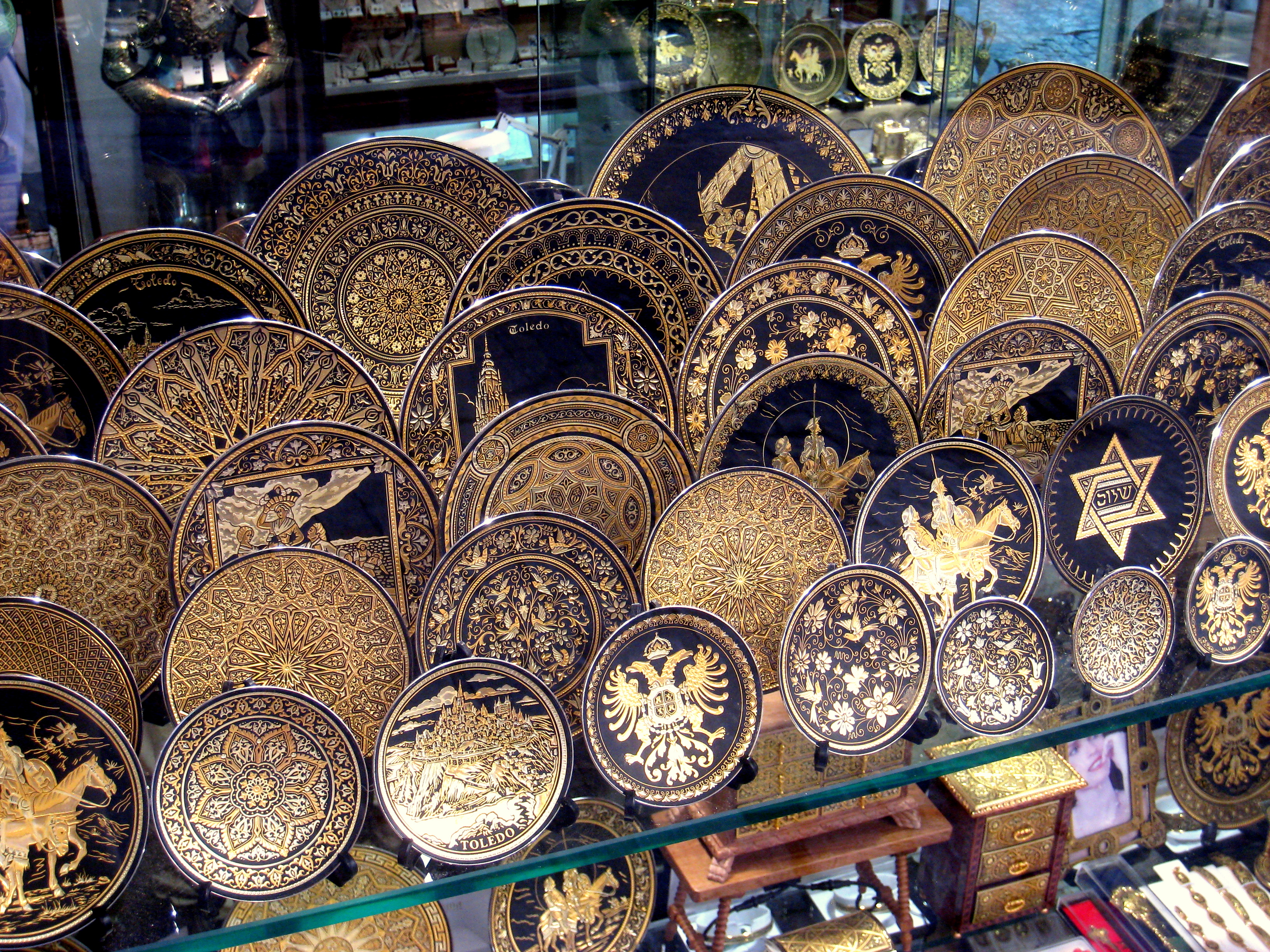
Some examples of damascened work in Toledo

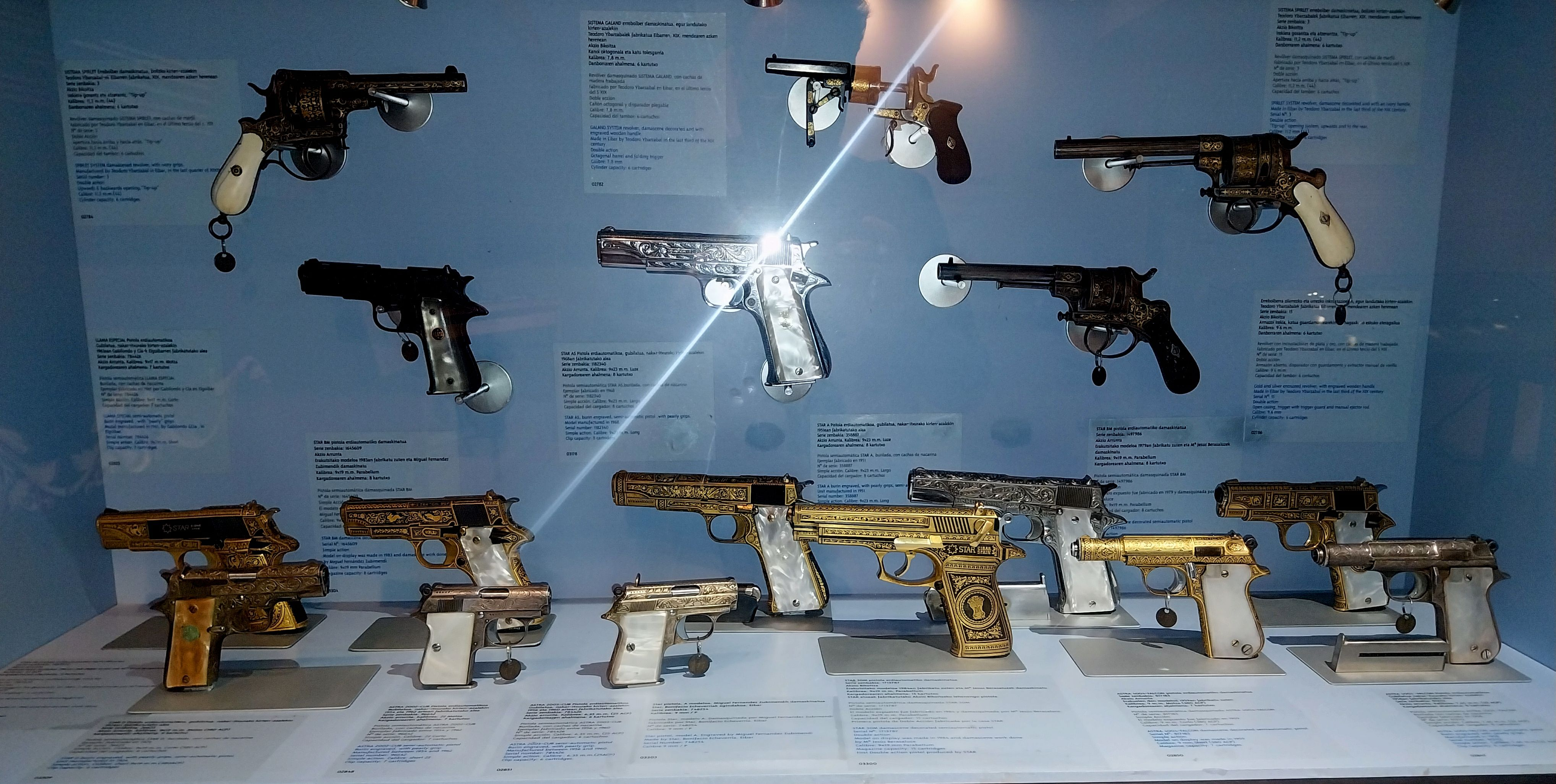
An array of damascened pistols

Damascening is the art of inlaying different metals into one another—typically, gold or silver into a darkly oxidized steel background—to produce intricate patterns similar to niello. The English term comes from a perceived resemblance to the rich tapestry patterns of damask silk. The term is also used to describe the use of inlaid copper interconnects in integrated circuits. As its name suggests, damascene gets its name from Damascus, Syria and the ancient artisans that created and exported this craft.

== Background ==
The technique, while also being used on firearms, has a long history in Japan, where it was used to decorate katana fittings, particularly tsuba. Known as zougan (象嵌) in Japanese, it has developed its own subset of terms to describe the particular patterns, although "shippou-zougan" is an enamelling technique which most Westerners would consider closer to champlevé.

Damascened-inlay jewelry, especially of Japanese origin, is sometimes referred to as shakudo from the use of that alloy as the dark background.

The technique of niello is also famously attested in prehistoric Greece. The earliest occurrence of damascening in the Aegean, from the Shaft Graves of Mycenae, dates to the latest Middle Bronze Age/Middle Helladic IIIB period (dagger Nu-304). Ultimately of Near Eastern provenance, the technique of inlaying silver/gold was adapted to suit Aegean taste and style.

Cities that are known for a rich history in Damascening where the technique is still practised are Malaysia; Indonesia; Toledo, Spain; Eibar in the Basque Country; and Kyoto, Japan; and Damascus, Syria.

During the early modern period high status Persian and Mughal weapons and armour could be Blued, and inlaid with Gold or Silver wire, through a Damascening technique known as Koftgari.

Damascening remains popular in Syria. It is also popular in Egypt, where it is called takfeet, though the art has faced decline due to the economic hardships faced by traditional artisans. However, some are working to revive it.

== Eibar, Spain ==
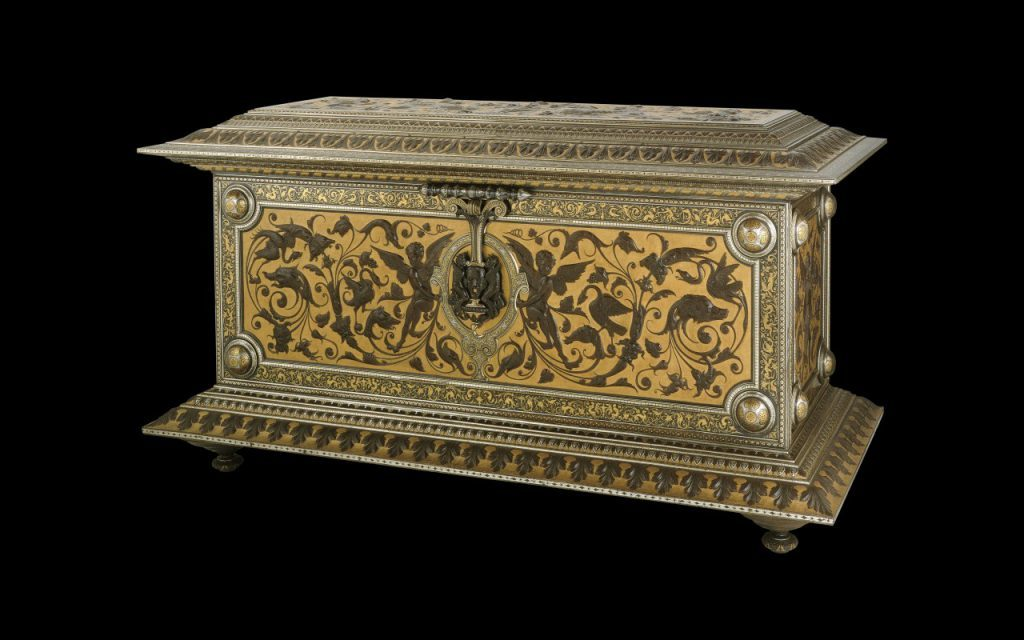
Iron cassone by Plácido Zuloaga, 1871

The Zuloaga family workshop at Eibar was the centre of Spanish damascening from the 19th century to the Spanish Civil War. Eusebio Zuloaga was a gunsmith and director of the Spanish Royal Armoury. A metalwork prodigy, Zuloaga undertook to restore damaged items in the armoury, and in the process studied and replicated decorative techniques of centuries past. This led to the establishment of Spain's damascene industry. Eusebio's eldest son Plácido Zuloaga eventually took over the workshop and directed its work away from armaments to the production of intricate decorative art works. In the process, he mastered and improved the techniques of damascening and trained more than two hundred artists. His works were exhibited at many national and international fairs, winning multiple gold and silver medals and extremely positive reviews from critics. The British-Iranian scholar and collector Nasser D. Khalili has assembled, published, and exhibited more than a hundred items of Spanish damascened metalwork from this period, forming the Khalili Collection of Spanish Damascene Metalwork.

== Toledo, Spain ==
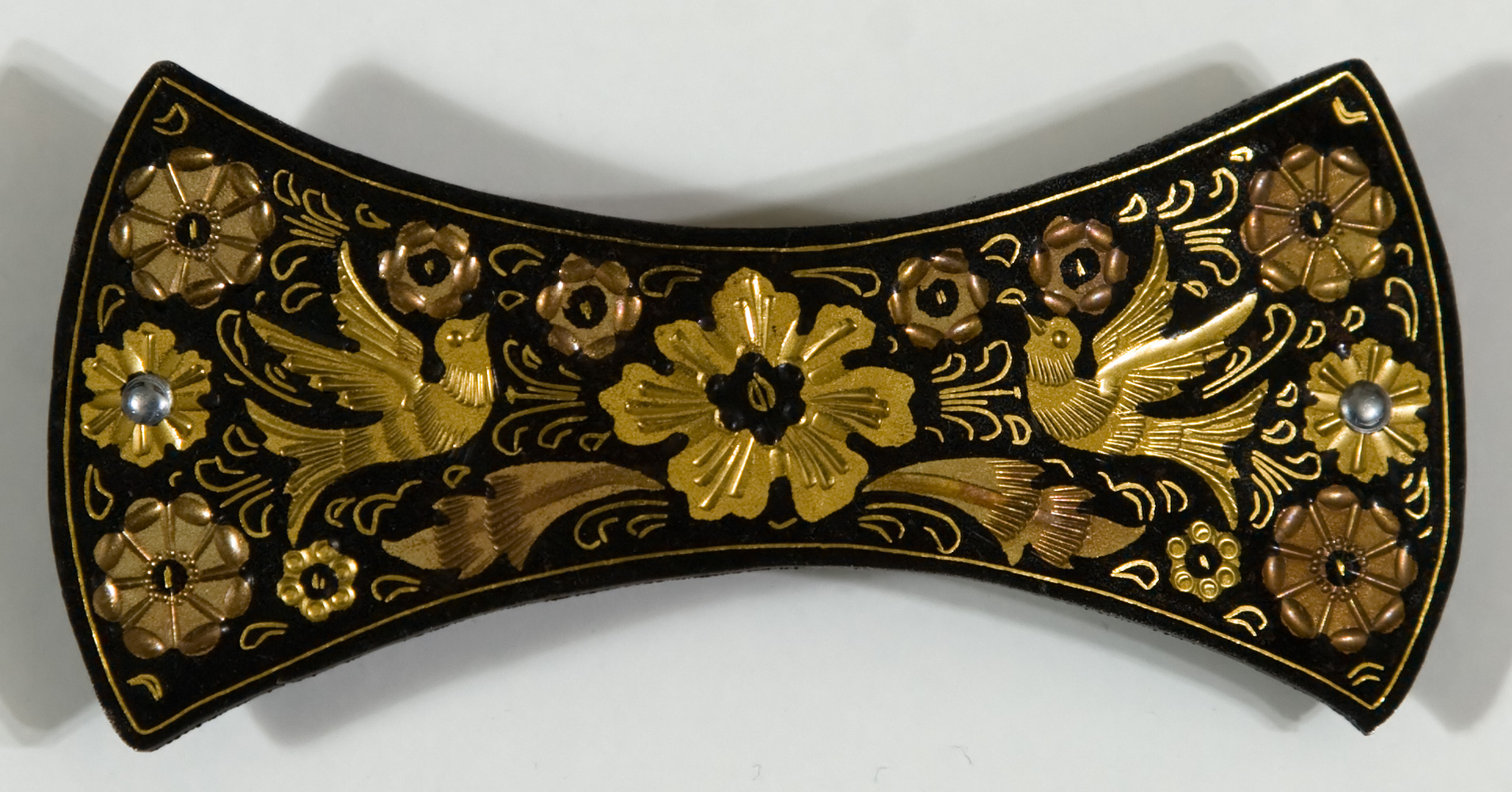
Detail of damascening, in this case gold inlaid into oxidized steel, in a hairclasp from Toledo, Spain.

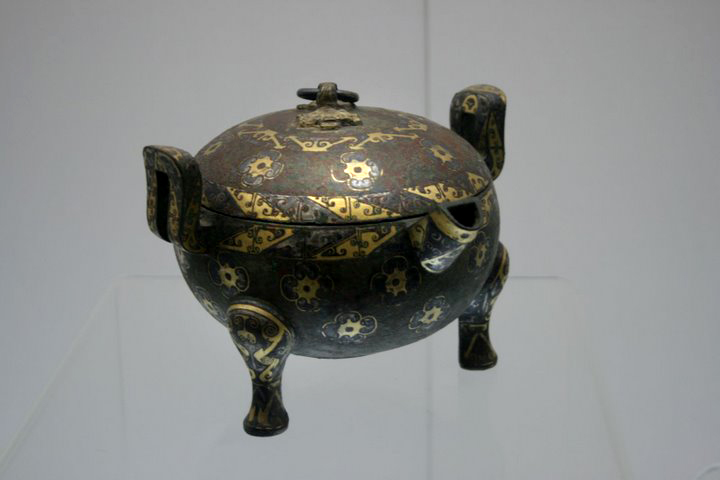
Ding bronze vessel with gold and silver inlay (Damascening) from the Warring States period (403-221 BC) of ancient China. (c. 300 BC)

Toledo has long been the major European centre, although most modern production is machine made, sometimes on tin rather than steel. Nevertheless, the art has long been practised in Persia, Japan and China.

Some of these reproductions are "so expertly produced that even knowledgeable Toledeans admit the difficulty of recognizing them as such."

Damascene work has kept to traditional designs with few changes over the years, but there are a few artists who design innovative pieces of jewellery. Because of these reasons the use of this technique has been most popular in Spain.

== Fujii, Japan ==
One of the most important Damascene creators was Fujii Yoshitoyo from Kyoto. He was born in 1868 and invented new techniques for the art of damascening. His designs were drawn by Bisei Unno of the Tokyo Fine Art School. He operated the Fujii Damascene Company from about 1925 through the mid 20th Century. In many exhibitions of this kind, Fujii was awarded first class medals for his exhibits, and his works have been purchased by the Imperial Household. Although Fujii's works are extremely detailed and very similar to the, for example, Komai's works, they are done in the etching technique and not in Zogan. Because Fujii's company was called "Fujii Damascene Co" or "Fujii Zogan Co" there should be arts he made in a Zogan technique, but until now, none of these were discovered.

== See also ==
- Kris
- Intarsia
- Marquetry
- Bidriware

== Sources ==
- Lavin, James D. (1997). The art and tradition of the Zuloagas : Spanish damascene from the Khalili Collection. Oxford: Khalili Family Trust in association with the Victoria and Albert Museum. ISBN 1-874780-10-2. OCLC 37560664.
