= Cassone =

Italian chest

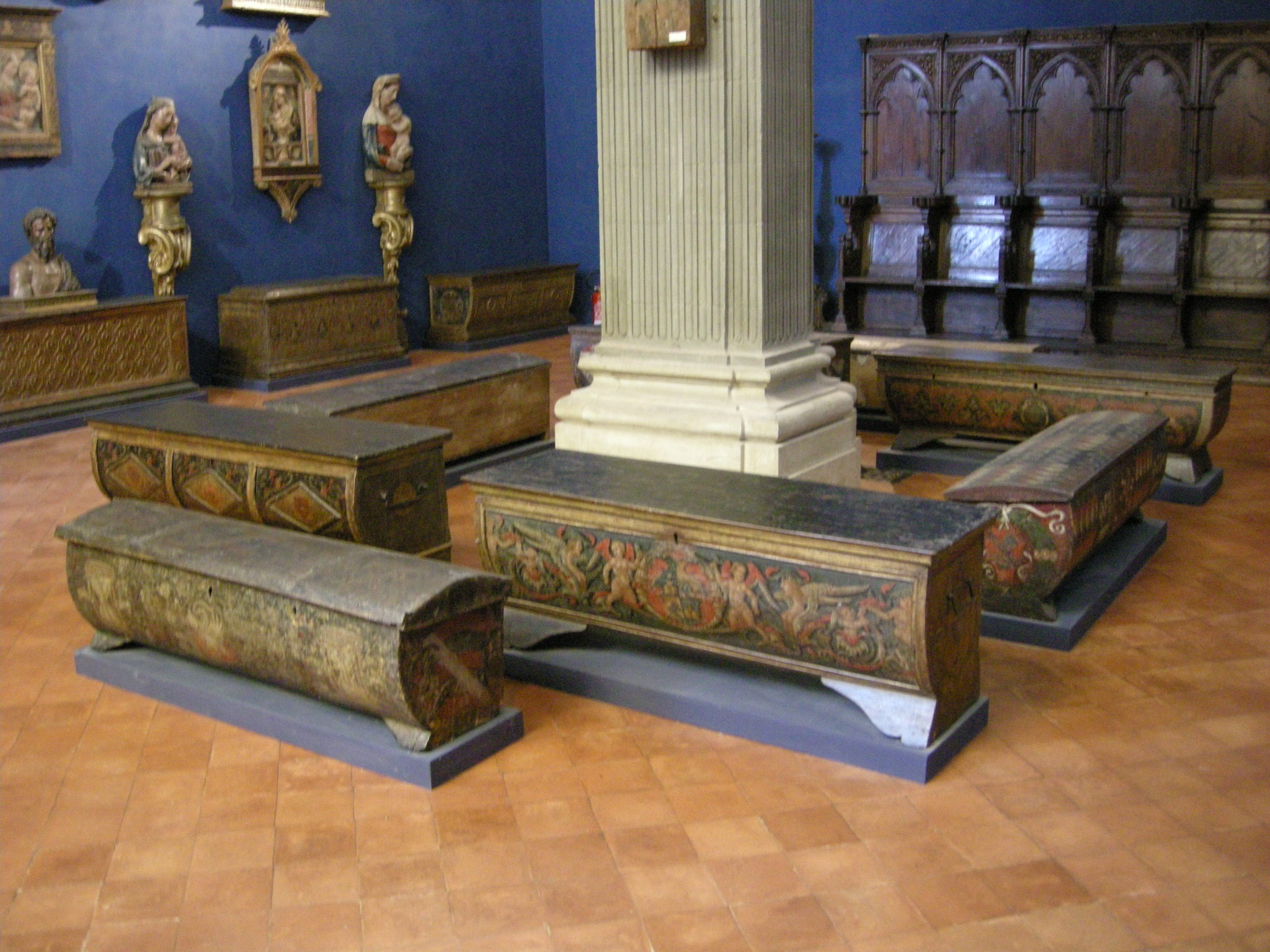
Some cassoni, in the Museo Bardini, Florence

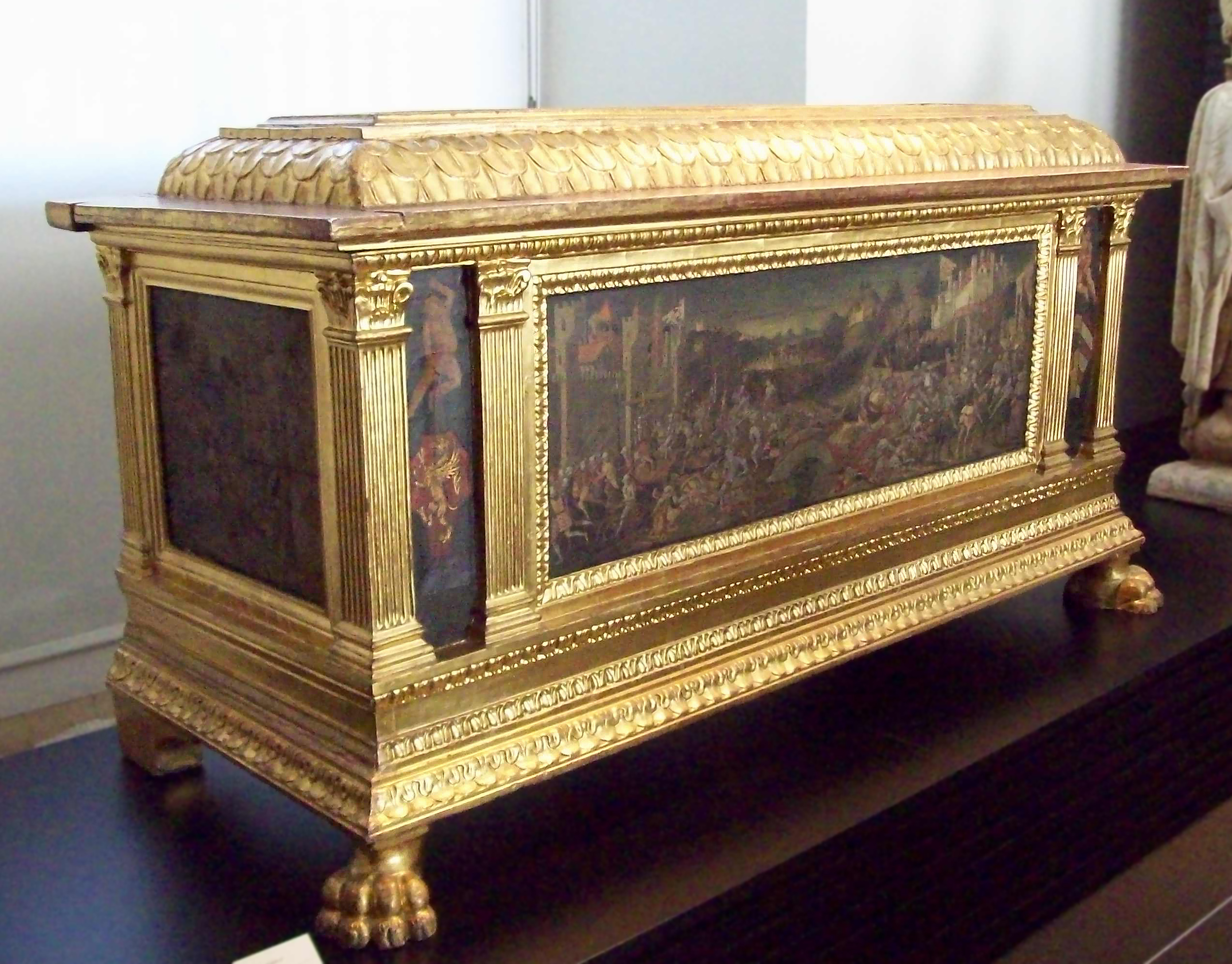
Florentine cassone from the 15th century (M.A.N., Madrid)

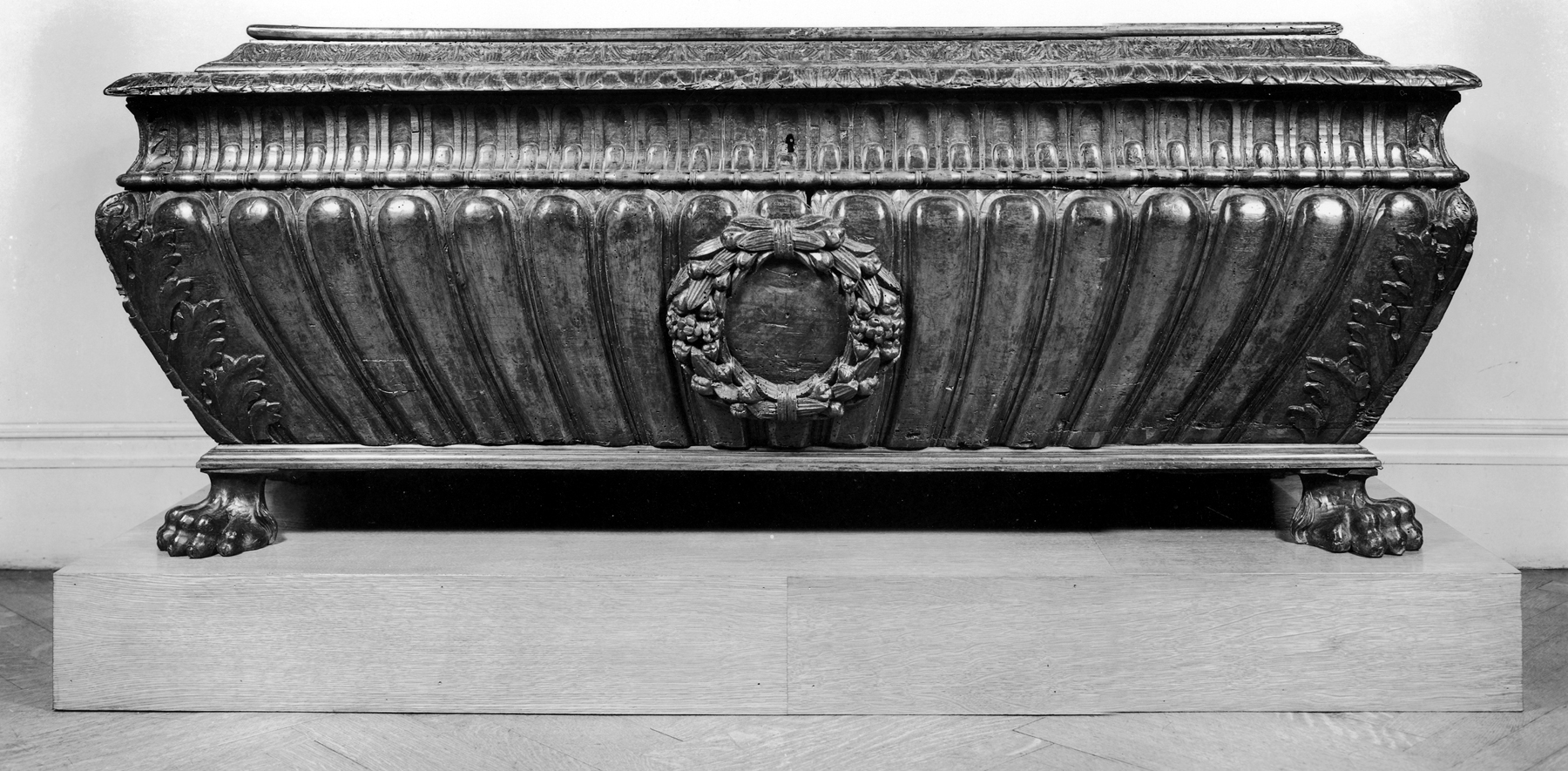
Walnut cassone in the form of an Antique sarcophagus, Rome, 16th century (Walters Art Museum)

A cassone (plural cassoni) or marriage chest is a rich and showy Italian type of chest, which may be inlaid or carved, prepared with gesso ground then painted and gilded. Pastiglia was decoration in low relief carved or moulded in gesso, and was very widely used. The cassone ("large chest") was one of the trophy furnishings of rich merchants and aristocrats in Italian culture, from the Late Middle Ages onward. The cassone was the most important piece of furniture of that time. It was given to a bride and placed in the bridal suite. It would be given to the bride during the wedding, and it was the bride's parents' contribution to the wedding.

There are in fact a variety of different terms used in contemporary records for chests, and the attempts by modern scholars to distinguish between them remain speculative, and all decorated chests are today usually called cassoni, which was probably not the case at the time. For example, a forziere probably denoted a decorated chest with a lock.

Since a cassone contained the personal goods of the bride, it was a natural vehicle for painted decoration commemorating the marriage in heraldry and, when figural painted panels began to be included in the decor from the early quattrocento, flattering allegory. The side panels offered a flat surface for a suitable painting, with subjects drawn from courtly romance or, much less often, religious subjects. By the 15th century subjects from classical mythology or history became the most popular. Great Florentine artists of the 15th century were called upon to decorate cassoni, though as Vasari complains, by his time in the 16th century, artists thought such work beneath them. Some Tuscan artists in Siena and Florence specialized in such cassone panels, which were preserved as autonomous works of art by 19th century collectors and dealers, who sometimes discarded the cassone itself. From the late 1850s, neo-Renaissance cassoni were confected for dealers like William Blundell Spence, Stefano Bardini or Elia Volpi in order to present surviving cassone panels to clients in a more "authentic" and glamorous presentation.

A typical place for such a cassone was in a chamber at the foot of a bed that was enclosed in curtains. Such a situation is a familiar setting for depictions of the Annunciation or the Visitation of St. Anne to the Virgin Mary. A cassone was largely immovable. In a culture where chairs were reserved for important personages, often pillows scattered upon the floor of a chamber provided informal seating, and a cassone could provide both a backrest and a table surface. The symbolic "humility" that modern scholars read into Annunciations where the Virgin sits reading upon the floor, perhaps underestimates this familiar mode of seating.

At the end of the 15th century, a new classicising style arose, and early Renaissance cassoni of central and northern Italy were carved and partly gilded, and given classical décor, with panels flanked by fluted corner pilasters, under friezes and cornices, or with sculptural panels in high or low relief. Some early to mid-sixteenth-century cassoni drew their inspiration from Roman sarcophagi (illustration, right). By the mid-sixteenth century Giorgio Vasari could remark on the old-fashioned cassoni with painted scenes, examples of which could be seen in the palazzi of Florentine families.

A cassone that has been provided with a high panelled back and sometimes a footrest, for both hieratic and practical reasons, becomes a cassapanca ("chest-bench"). Cassapanche were immovably fixed in the main public room of a palazzo, the sala or salone. They were part of the immobili ("unmoveables"), perhaps even more than the removable glazed window casements, and might be left in place, even if the palazzo passed to another family.

In the east part of Emilia Romagna, the "cassone" term is also used to describe a local food, which is a round flat bread cooked on a special pan called "testo".
