= Marc Duval =

Marc Duval may refer to:

- Marc Duval (painter), French painter
- Marc Duval (priest), French Roman Catholic priest
