= Master of the Prodigal Son =

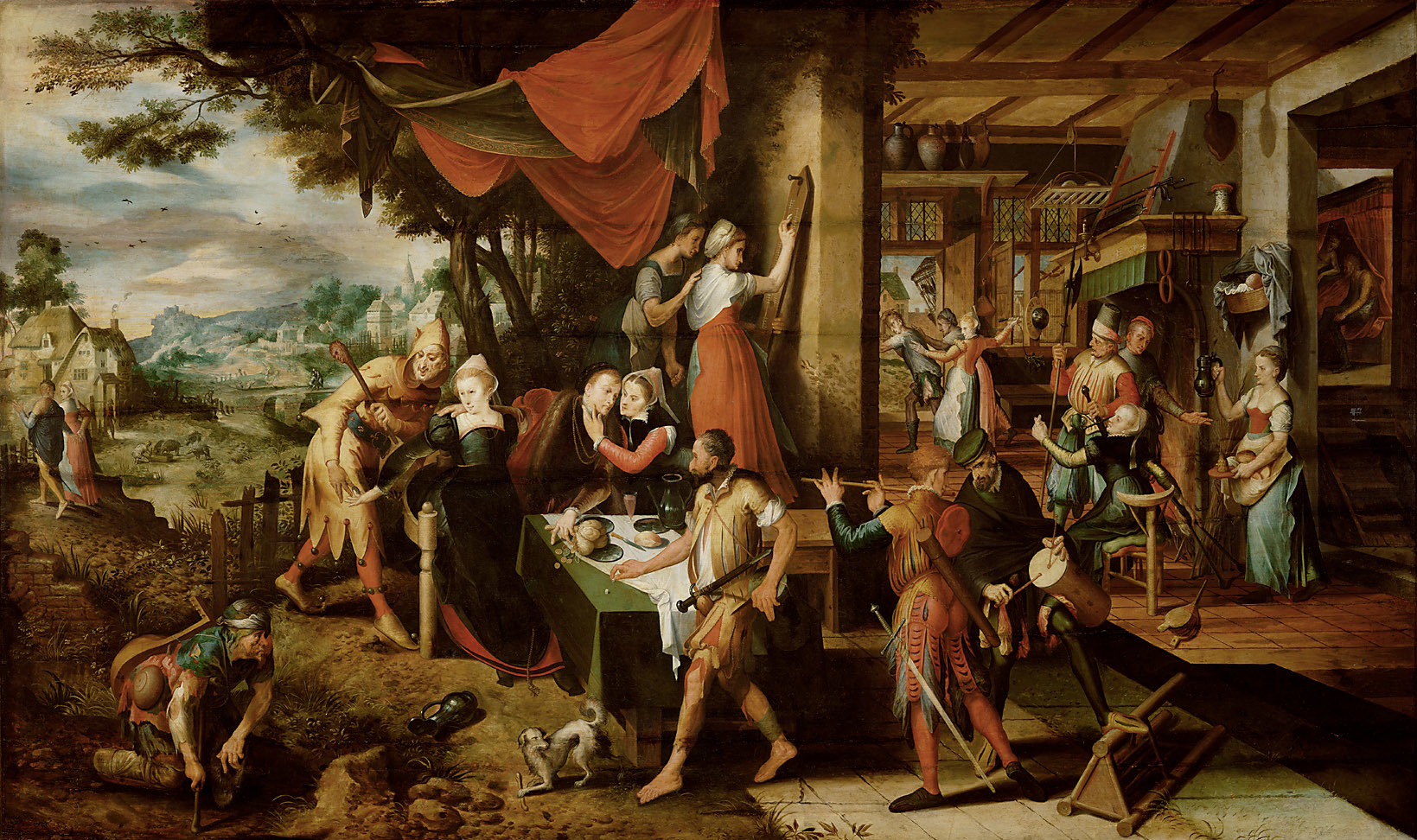
The return of the prodigal son

The Master of the Prodigal Son (fl. c.1530 – c.1560), was the notname given to a Flemish painter and designer of tapestries and stained glass. He was active in Antwerp where he operated a large workshop between 1530 and 1560. He painted religious subjects, landscapes, genre scenes and allegories. He is regarded as a leading master of Flemish Mannerism in the sixteenth century.

== Life ==
Little is known about this artist who was given his notname in 1909 by Belgian art historian Georges Hulin de Loo after one of his best-known works depicting The return of the prodigal son (collection of the Kunsthistorisches Museum in Vienna). A monogram of "LK" was discovered on one of his paintings. Some doubt has been raised as to whether the monogram is genuine and no other evidence exists to conclude that the artist should be identified with the Leonart Kroes mentioned as the teacher of Gillis van Coninxloo in the Flemish 16th century art historian Karel van Mander's Schilder-boeck of 1604. Stylistic characteristics of his work suggest he may have spent time in Italy but there is no independent evidence for foreign trip.

Based on the size of his output it is believed he operated a large workshop with several pupils in Antwerp.

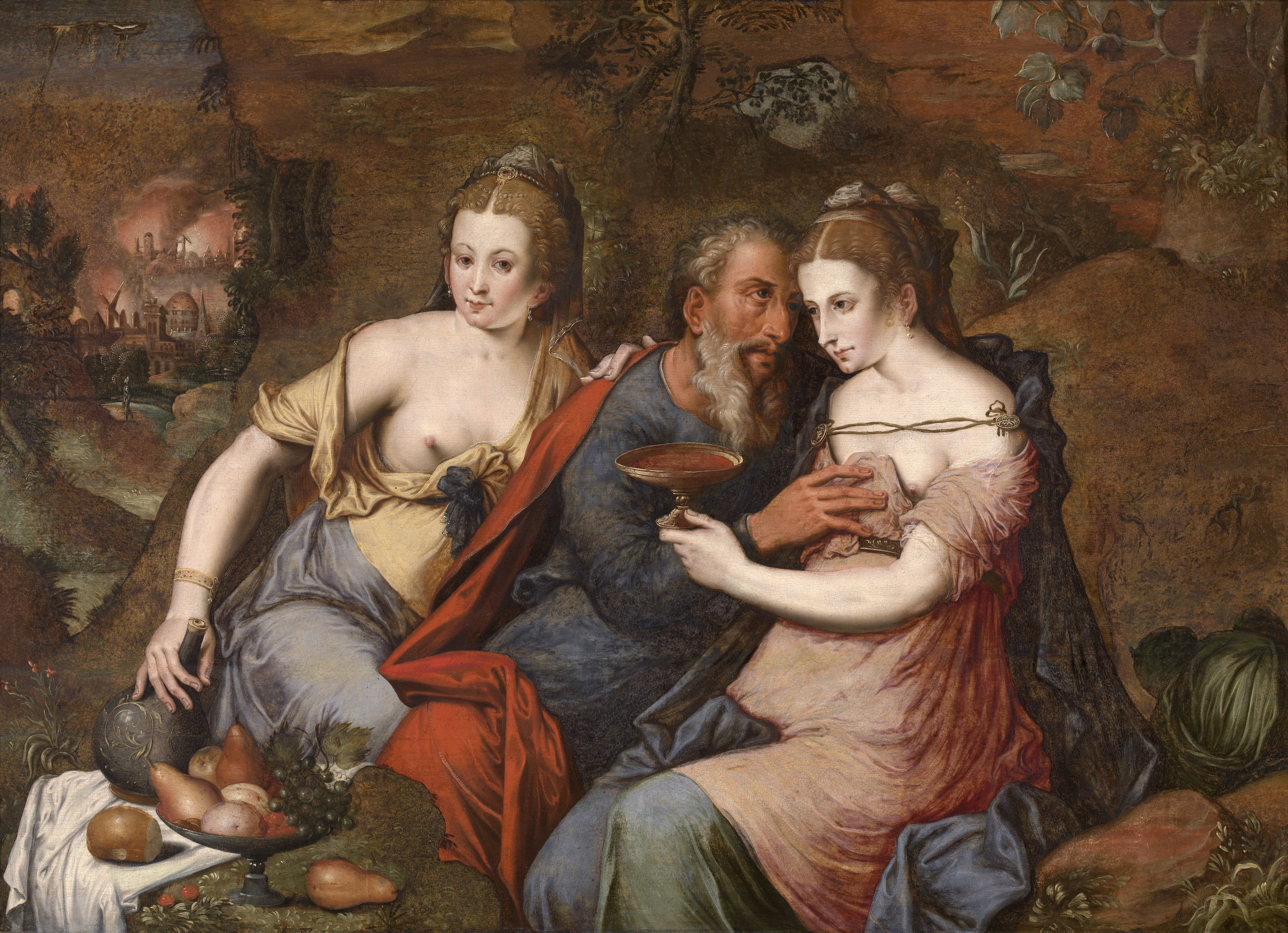
Lot and his daughters

== Work ==
He is known for landscapes, religious works and genre scenes as well as a few allegorical compositions. His only dated painting is a canvas of the Return of Tobit formerly in Berlin. In his religious composition landscapes often play an important role and also include still life elements. His Lot and his daughters includes a small see-through landscape with the city of Sodom burning and a still life of fruit on a plate, which are the precursors of the genres of landscape and still-life painting that arose during the 16th century.

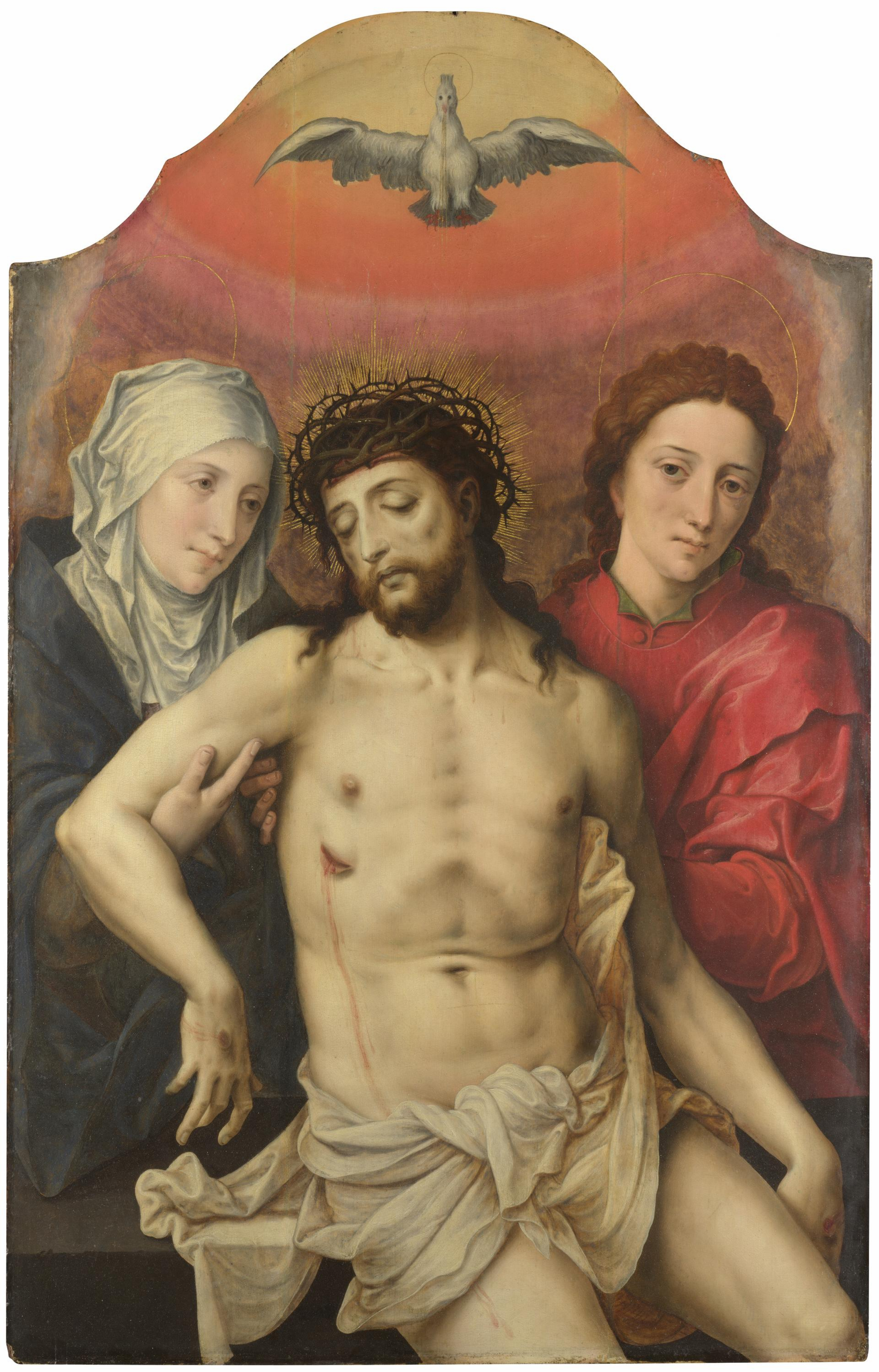
Pietà

His work shows the influence of leading painters working in Antwerp in the mid-16th century, such as Pieter Coecke van Aelst, Pieter Aertsen, Jan Mandijn and Frans Floris. The sharply accented realism of some figures in his work is closely related to Pieter Aertsen. A certain Mannerism in his work approaches his work to that of Jan Mandijn and Frans Floris as well as the School of Fontainebleau. This aspect is most obvious in his compositions with large figures such as the Lot and His Daughters (Royal Museum of Fine Arts Antwerp) in which the figures have a sculptural character. The color of the skin is clear and, in the female figures, also has the shine of marble. The bearded figures, on the other hand, are closer to the work of Frans Floris and Pieter Coecke van Aelst.

The Master of the Prodigal Son's characteristic style of painting figures is shown in the triptych of the Adoration of the Magi (Christie's sale of 9 December 2016, London lot 101). The small faces, pointed chins and closely placed eyes, the large hands with defined finger nails and the figures walking as if ‘on tiptoe’, are features which are typical of his style.

The Master was also a designer of tapestries. He designed a series of 10 tapestries entitled The life of Tobias which was woven in various editions and variations. The series was often used as a wedding gift as it tells the story of how Sarah was liberated from the devil by her uncle Tobias on the night of her wedding. The Master used in his designs for the series the Renaissance architecture, men on horseback, flock and trees that are also present in the tapestries designed by his contemporary Bernard van Orley. However, due to the awkward placement of the figures in space the designs fail to convince.
