= Frans Verbeeck =

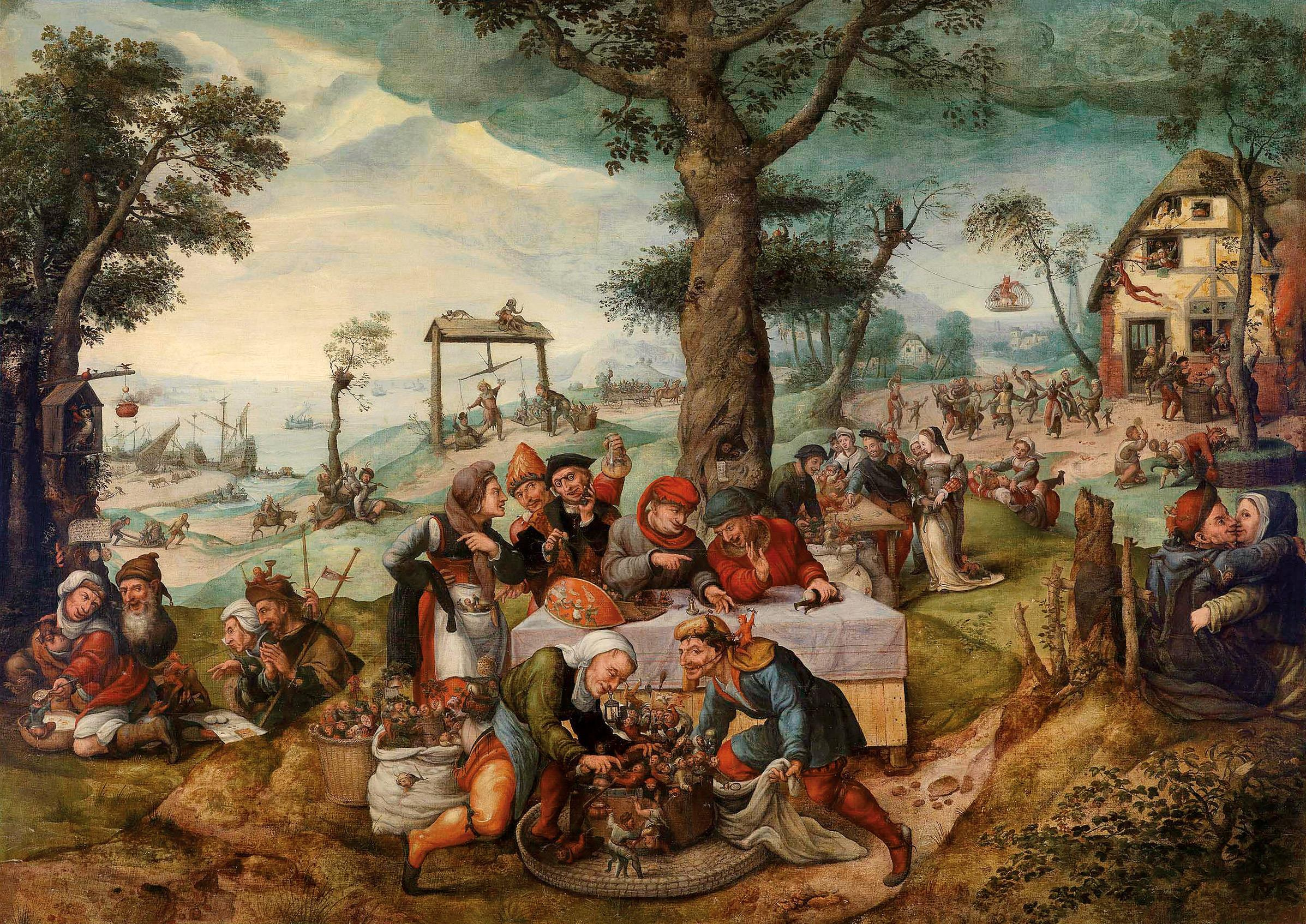
The Mocking of Human Follies

Frans Verbeeck or Frans Verbeeck the Elder (c. 1510 – 24 July 1570, Mechelen) was a Flemish painter and draughtsman to whom have been attributed a number of works depicting fantastical and grotesque scenes carrying a moralizing intent. He was a member of an important family of artists operating a large workshop with various branches in Mechelen. As it is not always possible to attribute a particular artwork to one or the other family member due to compositional, stylistic, and iconographic similarities, it has been suggested that the works should be attributed to the 'Verbeeck group'. The works were typically executed in tempera or watercolor on linen.

== Life ==
There is very little known with certainty about Frans Verbeeck. He was a member of the Verbeeck family of artists based in Mechelen. There were about 15 painters recorded in the archives of Mechelen with the name Frans Verbeeck. There were also multiple artists with the name Jan Verbeeck active in Mechelen. Frans Verbeeck is the best-known of the artists in the family.

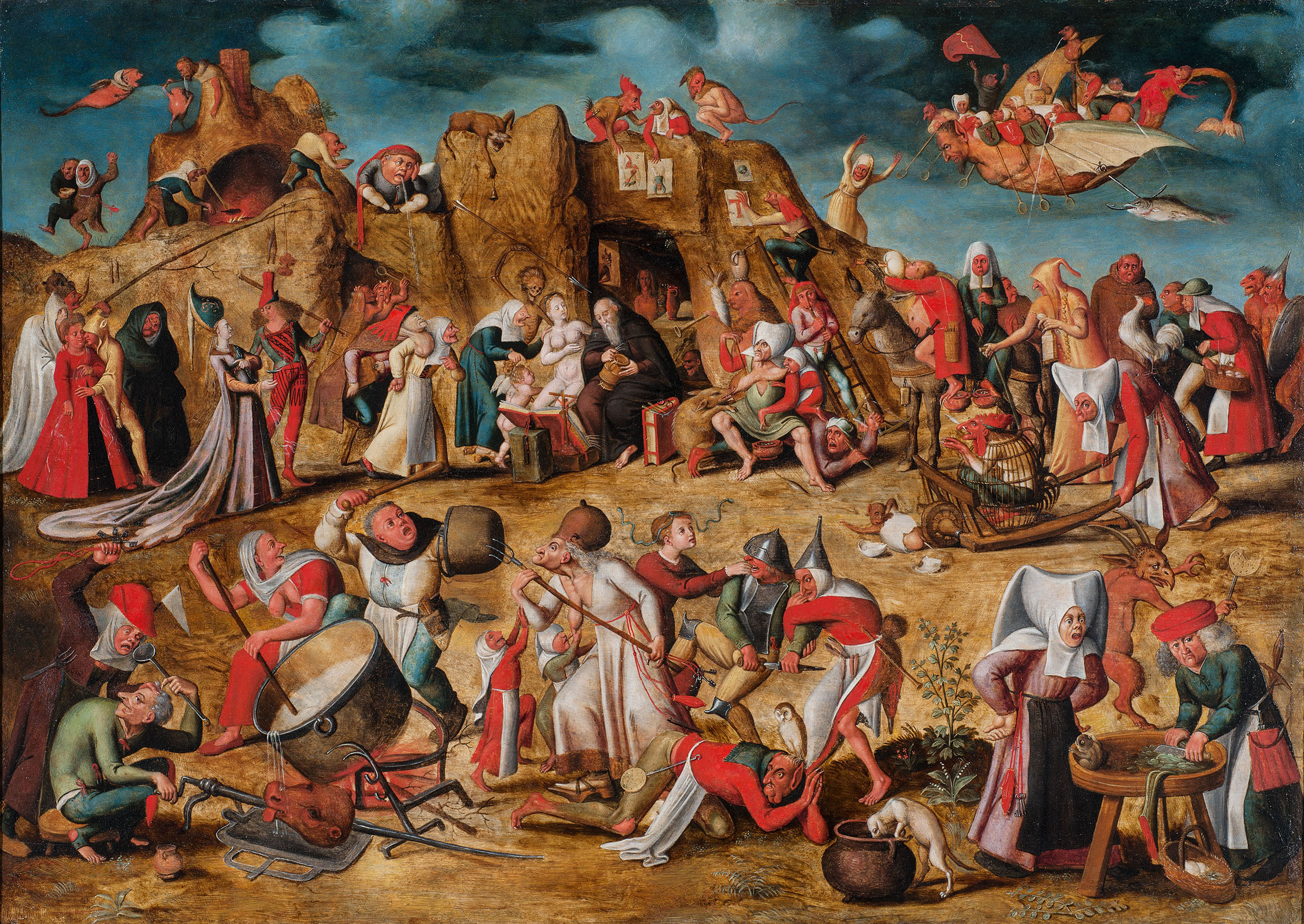
The temptation of Saint Anthony

He was likely born around 1510. According to the early Flemish biographer Karel van Mander, Frans Verbeeck was a pupil of Frans Minnebroer in Mechelen. Frans Verbeeck became a master of the local painter's guild in Mechelen in 1531. He was dean of the guild on multiple occasions including in 1563, 1564 and 1565.

The Verbeeck family formed a dynasty of artists producing a large output of paintings in a workshop with multiple branches. They produced mainly compositions of a small scale using tempera rather than oil. The art historian Paul Vandenbroeck proposed in 1981 that the works created in the workshop should be attributed to the 'Verbeeck group', due to the close proximity in composition, style and iconographic language applied. Vandenbroeck felt it was impossible and meaningless to attempt to distinguish between individual family members such as Frans and Jan Verbeeck and attribute these paintings to one or the other artist. Despite the difficulty of distinguishing between the artists in the Verbeeck group, some works have been attributed specifically to Frans Verbeeck. The composition The Mocking of Human Follies (Auctioned at Dorotheum, 21 October 2014, lot 33) was listed in 2003 in the catalogue of exhibition 'De Zotte Schilders' ('The Mad Painters') as a painting by Frans Verbeeck, with the addition 'de Oude', which translates to 'the Elder'. There was also a Frans Verbeeck the Younger who is recorded having pupils between 1608 and 1614.

== Work ==
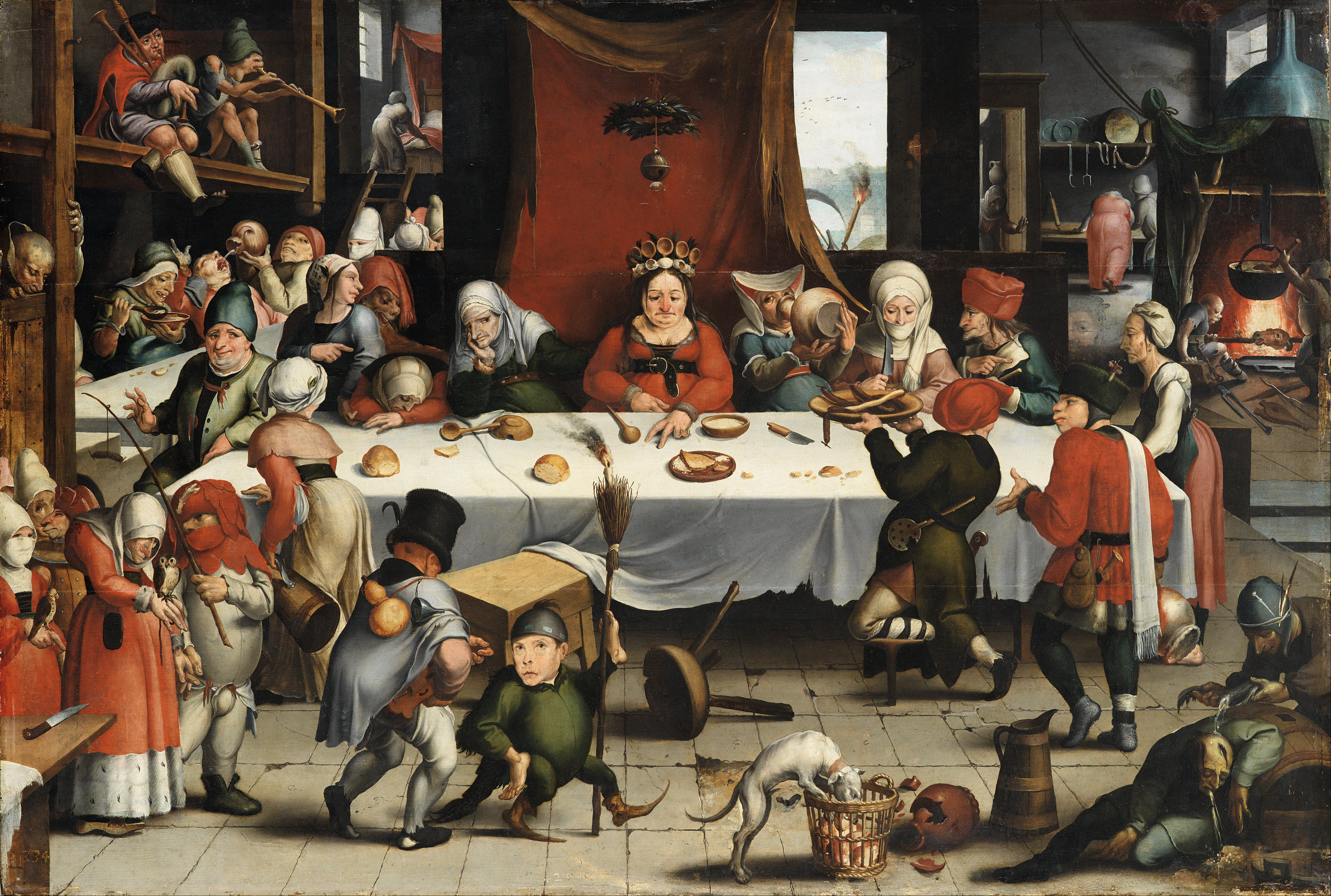
Burlesque Feast (formerly attributed to Jan Mandijn)

Frans Verbeeck did not leave any known signed paintings. A fair number of compositions with Hieronymus Bosch-like subjects, that could not be attributed to Bosch followers such as Jan Mandijn or to Pieter Huys, have been attributed to him. The range of his subject matter is very wide and includes religious scenes like The Temptation of St Anthony, satirical subjects of vernacular peasant life, such as The Mocking of Human Follies (Bilbao, Museo de Bellas Artes de Bilbao), allegorical works like The Mocking of Human Follies (Auctioned at Dorotheum, 21 October 2014, lot 33) as well as scenes of witches such as Temptation of Saint Anthony (At Gallerie De Jonckheere) or the Witches' Sabbath (Christie's London sale of 6 December 2018 lot 3).

Frans Verbeeck is known for his depictions of peasant weddings and similar subject matter dealing with satirical and moralistic themes, inspired by Hieronymus Bosch and by the plays performed in the local chambers of rhetoric. Many of his compositions were painted in watercolor, which was the favoured medium of Mechelen artists in the 16th and 17th centuries.

The family Verbeeck seems to be one of the first to have developed the theme of the peasant wedding. Three watercolor paintings on the theme are known, two of which depict carnavalesque weddings and one a joust. One of these paintings entitled Burlesque Feast (Bilbao Fine Arts Museum) was previously ascribed to Jan Mandijn, an attribution which is no longer accepted by art historian Paul Vandenbroeck and the RKD.

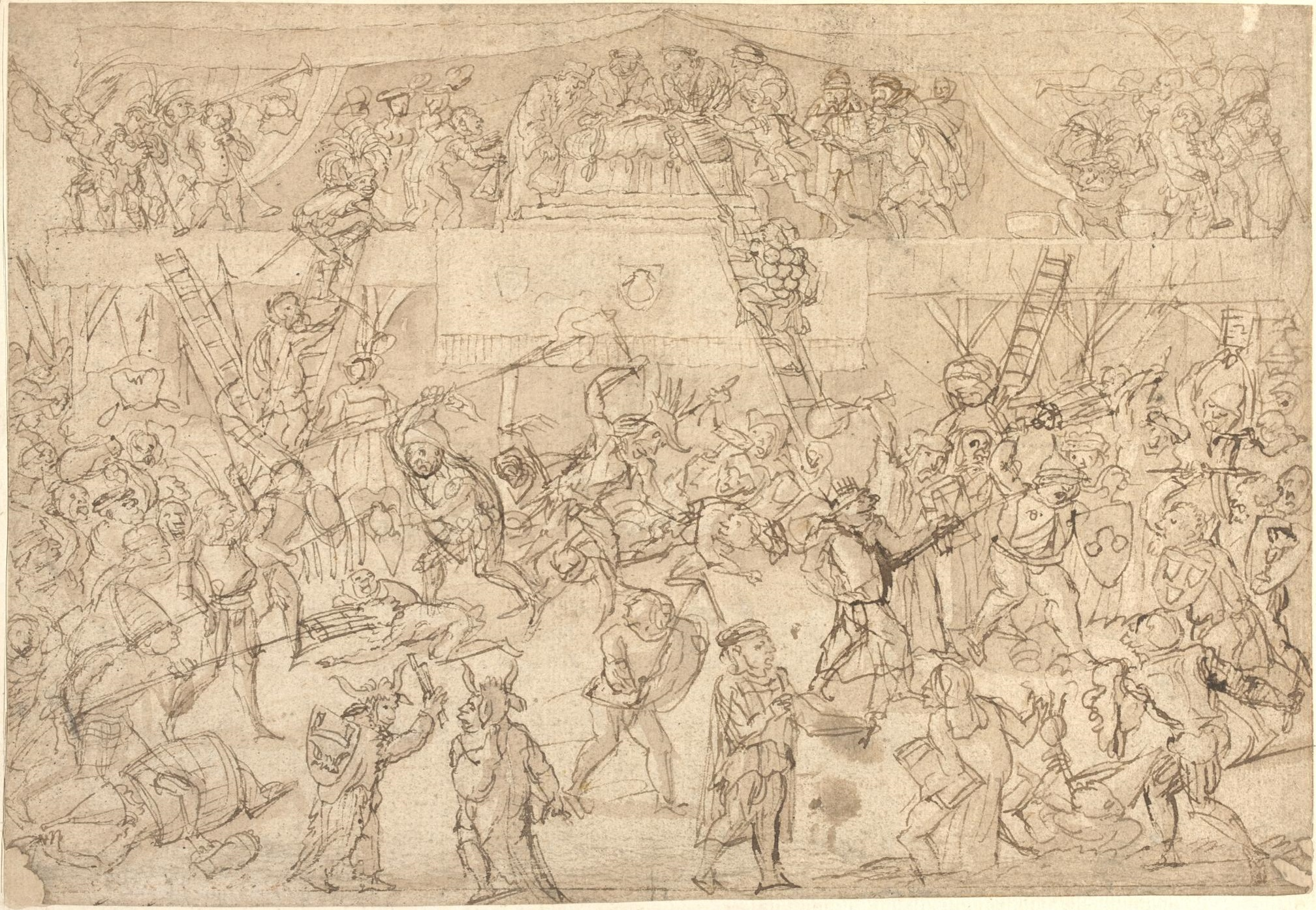
A satire on avarice and the mutual hostility between the classes

Another representative work attributed to Frans Verbeeck is The Mocking of Human Follies, of which there exist two versions, one the original (Auctioned at Dorotheum, 21 October 2014, lot 33) and the other a smaller workshop copy (Auctioned at Dorotheum on 16 October 2007, lot 38).

The subjects of peasant weddings and human follies aimed to criticise in a funny and absurd manner the foolish, animal-like behaviour of man led by lust, desire and impulse. By mocking human follies these scenes were to serve as negative examples of improper behaviour for the urban elite of the Low Countries. The motivation behind, or key to deciphering, many of the allusive, rebuslike details of the compositions in the Verbeeck group can be traced to the satirical texts of the chambers of rhetoric, whose members loved elegantly poking fun at human vices and folly. The humour used in these compositions was direct, obscene and scabrous, with no trace of refinement. These subjects and motives stand in a long line that goes from Hieronymus Bosch (ca. 1450–1516) over Jan Wellens de Cock (ca. 1470–1521), Jan Mandijn (ca. 1500–ca. 1560), Pieter Huys (ca. 1519–ca. 1581) and Frans Verbeeck (ca. 1510/15–1570) to Pieter Brueghel the Elder (1526/30–1569) and further to Pieter Brueghel the Younger (1564–1638).

The Verbeeck family had developed and maintained an individual style that can be distinguished from the two great Flemish masters of the bizarre Hieronymous Bosch and Pieter Brueghel the Elder. According to Frans Verbeeck the Verbeeck family's world of imagery offers a personal vision of the human race inspired by Flemish folklore.
