= Adolfo Guiard =

Spanish painter (1860–1916)

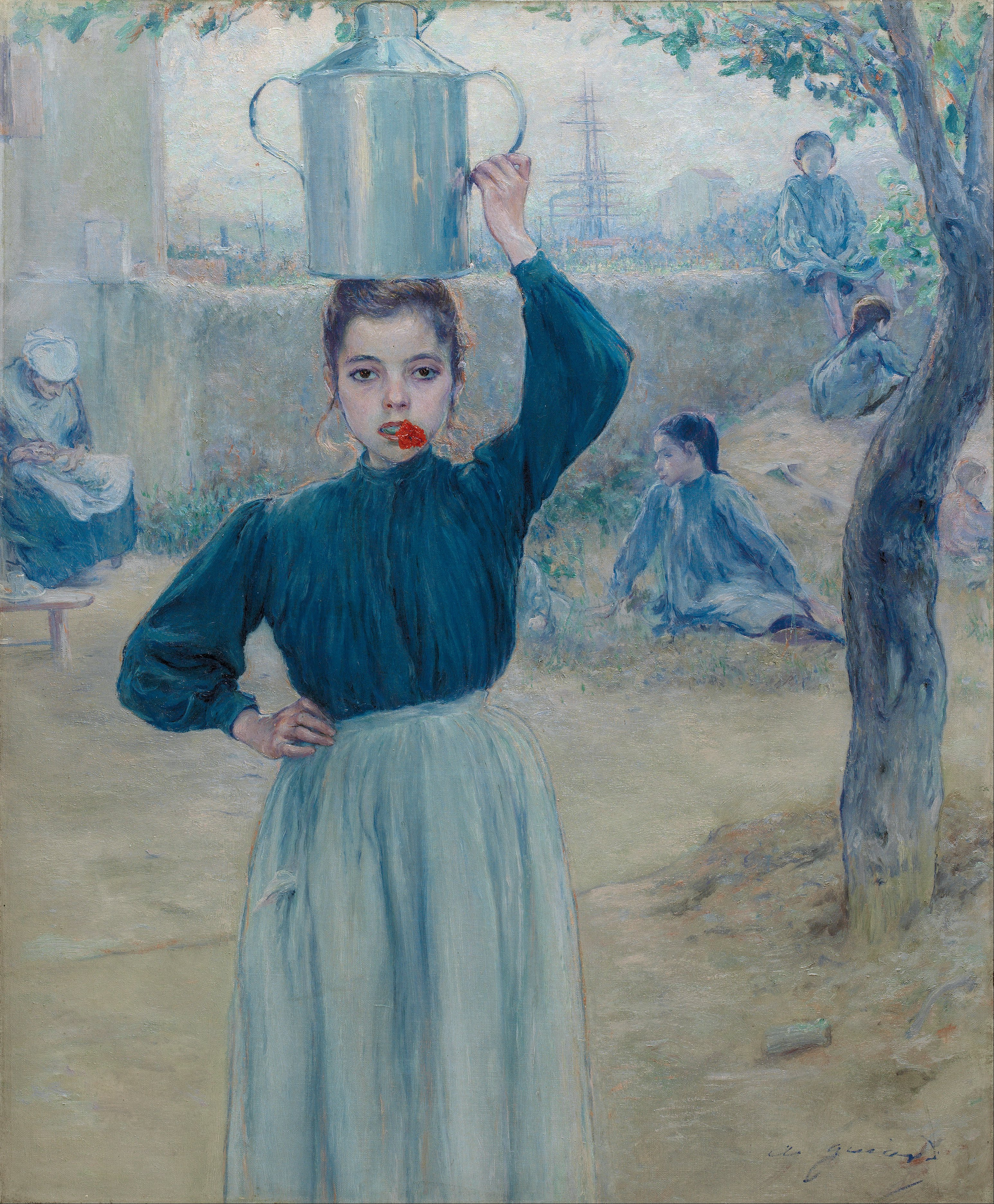
Village Girl with Red Carnation; his most familiar work

Adolfo Guiard Larrauri (10 August 1860 – 8 March 1916) was a Spanish painter in the Impressionist style.

== Biography ==
He was born in Bilbao, Spain, one of the fifteen children of Alphonse Guiard, a photographer who had come from France. The family was generally well off, but suffered hard times after his father's studio burned as the result of a shelling during the Third Carlist War.

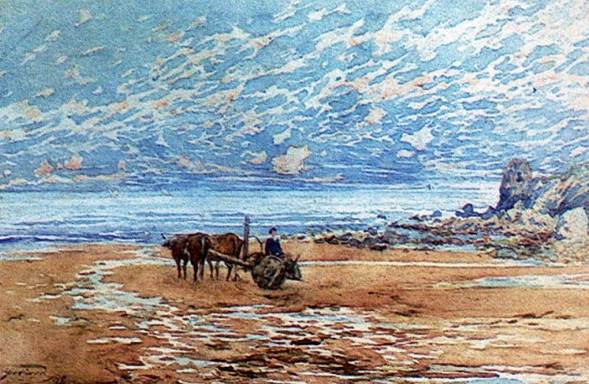
The Beach at Bakio

The writer, Nicolás de Viar y Egusquiza, has recounted how his (Viar's) mother gave Adolfo his first set of watercolors and launched his career. His first formal lessons were with Antonio Lecuona, a noted costumbrista painter. At the age of sixteen, he went to Barcelona to continue his studies with Ramon Martí Alsina.

In 1878, he went to Paris, where he was able to enroll at the Académie Colarossi and study with Léon Glaize who declared that he was a "born painter". He also became acquainted with other established painters; notably Degas, who had a major influence on his work.

Around 1886, he returned to Bilbao. The following year, he received a major commission from the Sociedad Bilbaína to decorate their headquarters. He established a workshop in Bakio, to work on the commission, and had his first solo exhibition that same year. The initial critical responses were largely negative, but his work was praised by Miguel de Unamuno.

In 1890, he relocated to Murueta and concentrated on landscapes. Around 1900, he lived briefly in Deustu and participated in the first exhibition of modern art, held in Bilbao, which made his work more popular despite continuing negative reviews. He finally settled in Artea, where he shared a studio with Anselmo Guinea. In 1902, he exhibited with other Spanish artists at the Silberberg Galleries in Paris.

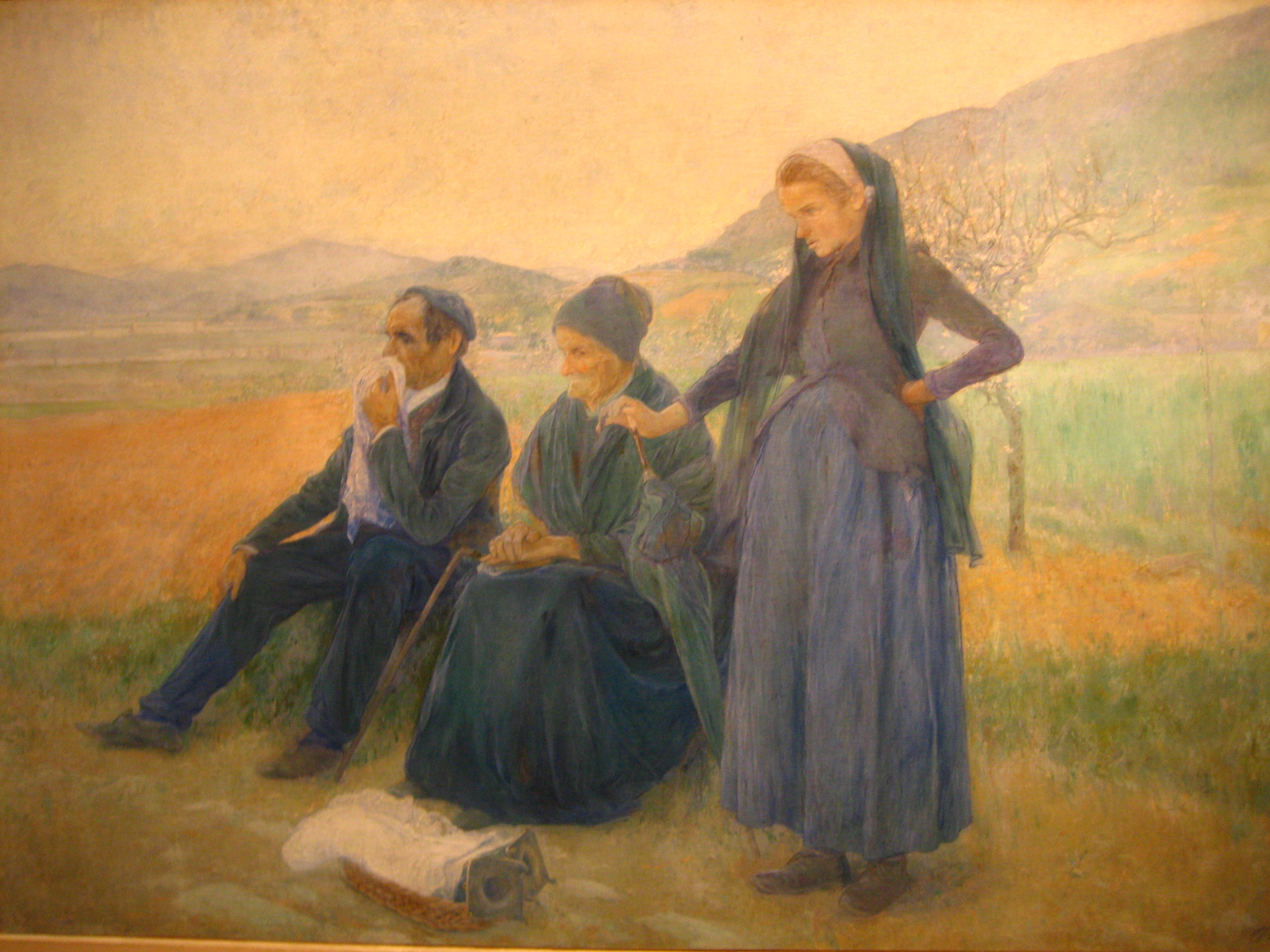
De Promesa (Hopeful Undertaking)

In 1908, he began contributing to a satirical journal called El Coitao that included articles from other artists and writers, young and old, such as Unamuno, Tomás Meabe and José Arrue. Three years later, he began to exhibit with the new Basque Artists' Association, but never became a member.

In his final years, his output decreased dramatically. He died in Bilbao, aged 56. Major retrospectives were held in 1916, 1927 and, more recently, in 1984 at the Bilbao Fine Arts Museum. Most of his works are in private collections.
