= Bartholomeus Spranger =

Flemish painter

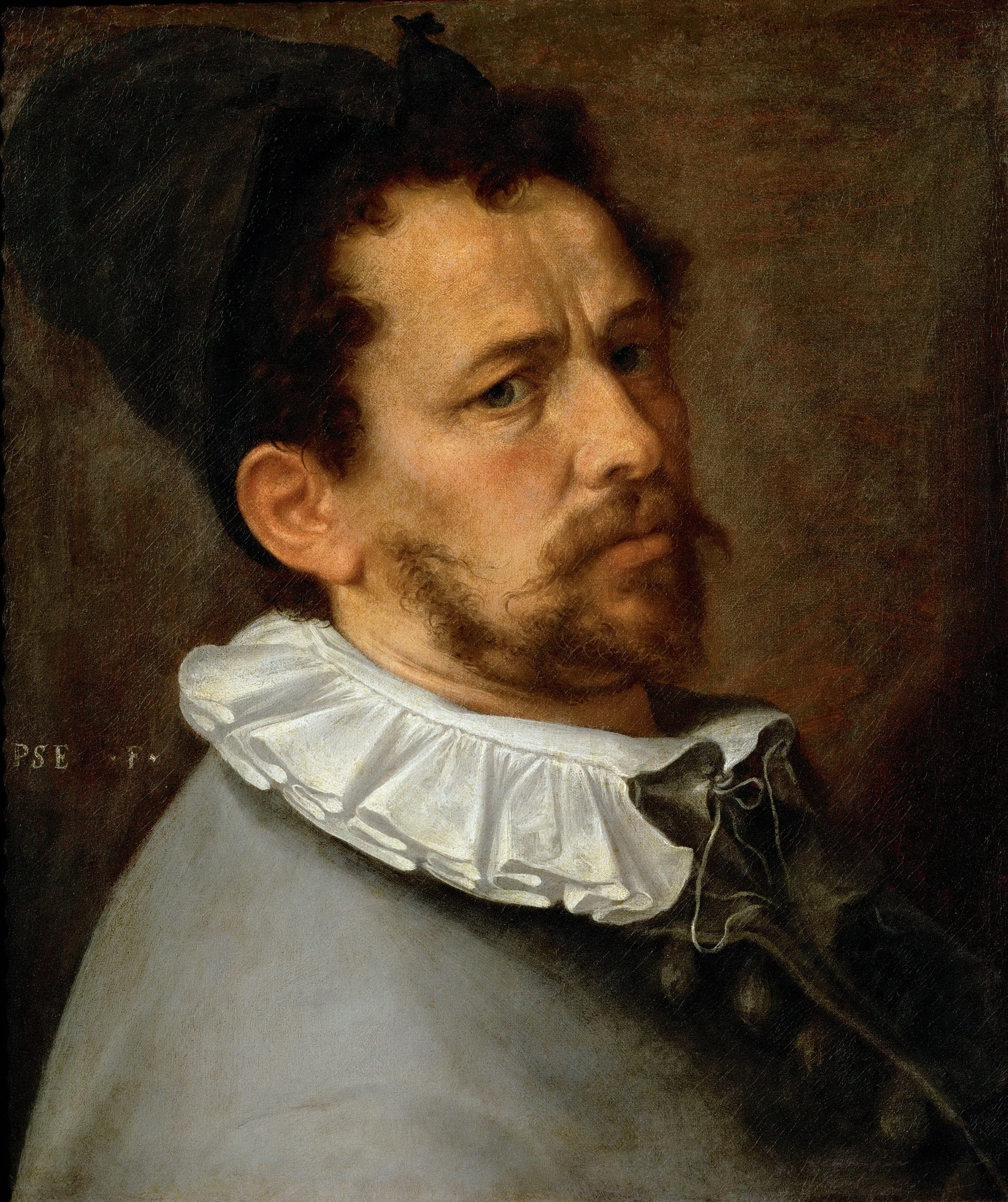
Self-portrait

Bartholomeus Spranger or Bartholomaeus Spranger (21 March 1546 – 27 June 1611) was a Flemish painter, draughtsman, sculptor, and designer of prints. Working in Prague as a court artist for the Holy Roman emperor Rudolf II, he responded to his patron's aesthetic preferences by developing a version of the artistic style referred to as Northern Mannerism. This style stressed sensuality, which was expressed in smoothly modeled, elongated figures arranged in elegant poses, often including a nude woman seen from behind. Spranger's unique style combining elements of Netherlandish painting and Italian influences, in particular the Roman Mannerists, had an important influence on other artists in Prague and elsewhere, in particular the Dutch Republic, as his paintings were disseminated widely through prints as well as by artists who had worked with him such as Karel van Mander.

== Life ==
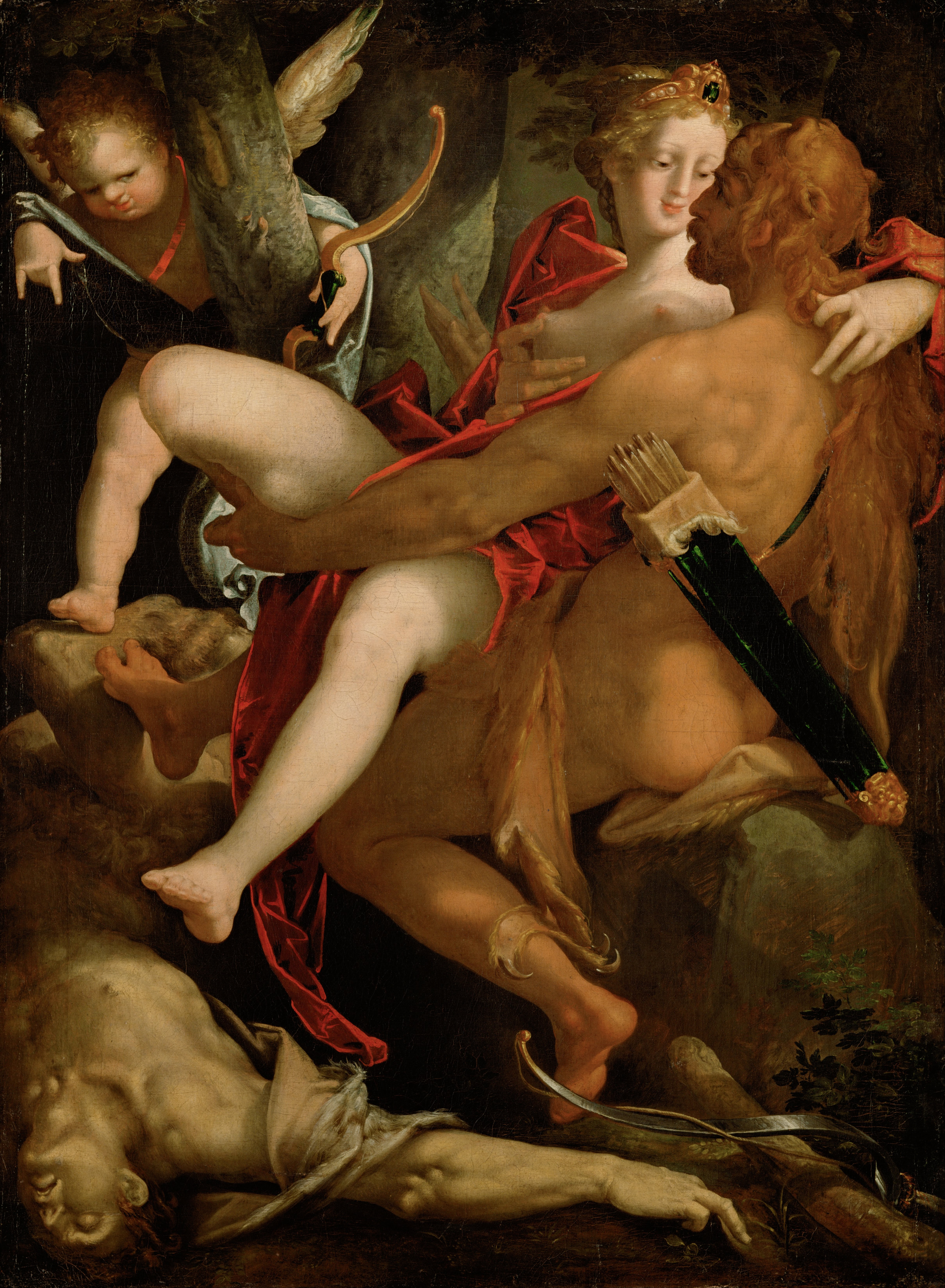
Hercules, Deianira and the Centaur Nessus

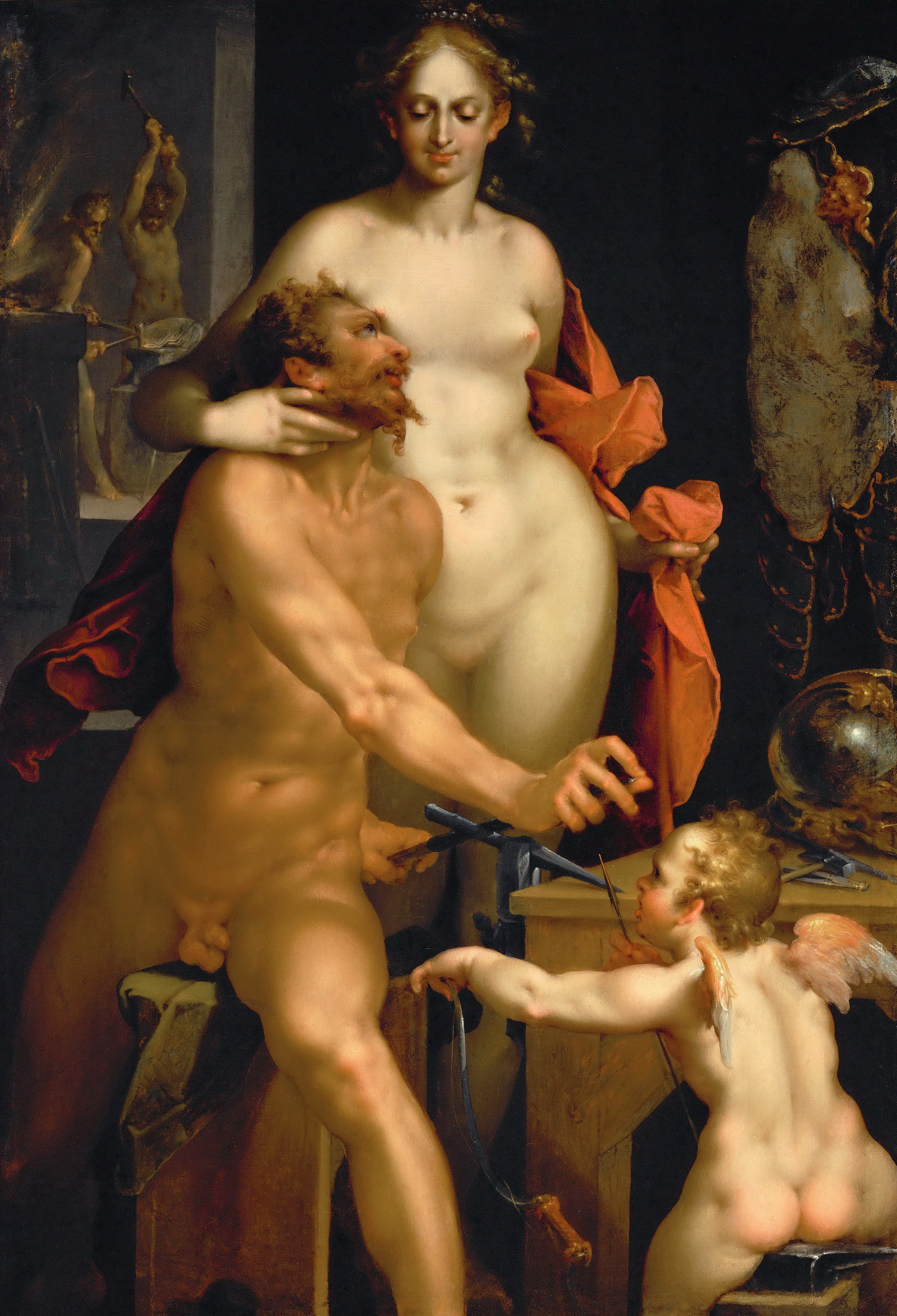
Venus in Vulcan's forge

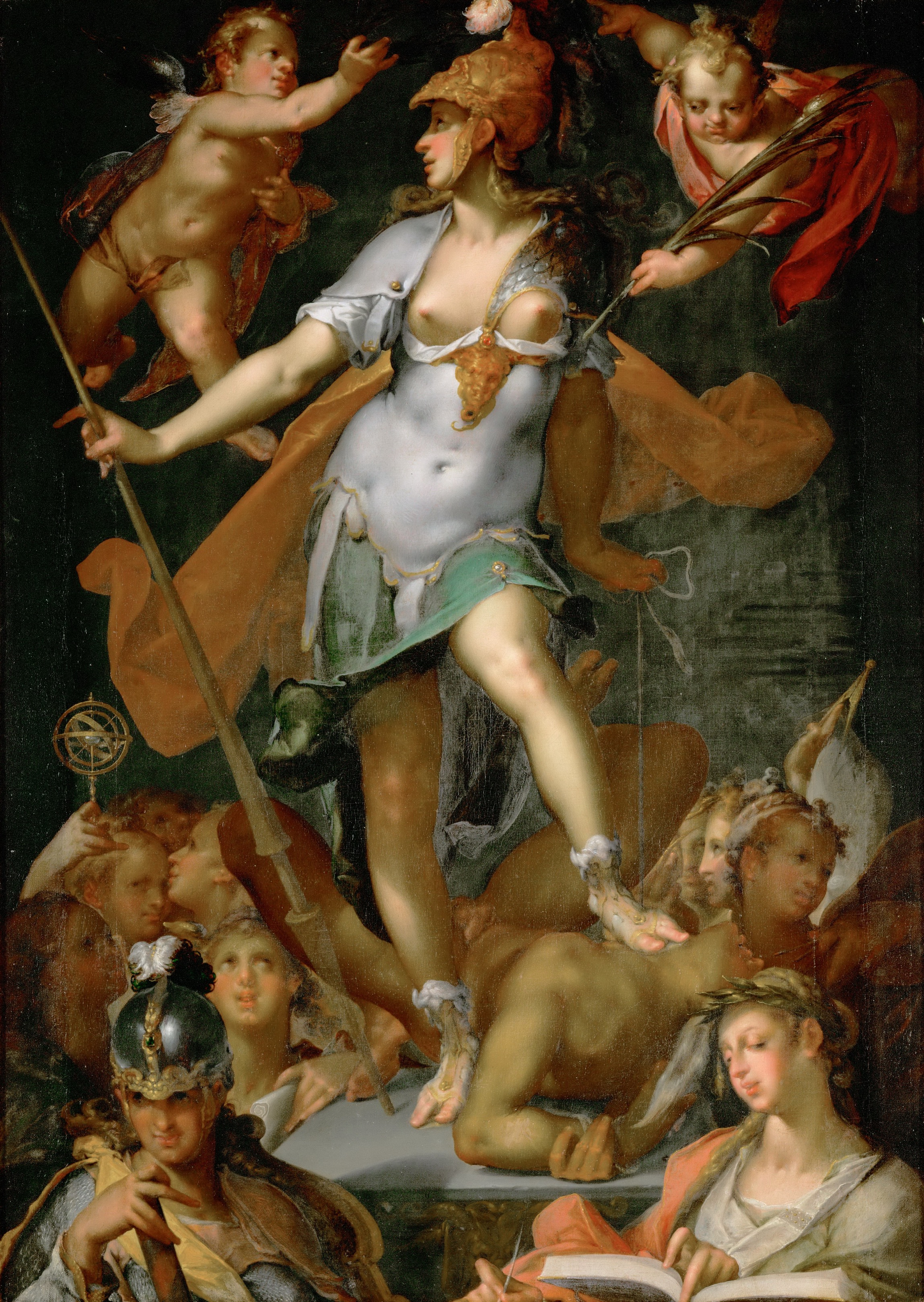
Minerva Victorious over Ignorance

Bartholomeus Spranger was born in Antwerp as the third son of Ioachim Spranger and Anna Roelandtsinne. His father was a trader who had spent time abroad including a long stint in Rome. Showing a keen interest in drawing, he was first apprenticed with Jan Mandijn, where he stayed for 18 months. Upon the death of Mandijn, Spranger studied for some time with Frans Mostaert who died after only a few weeks. He finally studied with Cornelis van Dalem for two years after which he stayed on for another two years in the workshop of van Dalem. As his three masters were mainly known as landscape painters. Spranger further copied prints of Frans Floris and Parmigianino. He traveled to Paris on 1 March 1565 where he worked for six weeks in the workshop of Marc Duval. He then travelled on to Italy, where he first stayed for eight months in Milan. He then worked for three months in Parma as an assistant to Bernardino Gatti on the painting of the dome of the Santa Maria della Steccata

He worked on wall paintings in various churches. In Rome he became, like El Greco, a protégé of Giulio Clovio. Here he also met Karel van Mander who later included a biography of Spranger in his Schilder-boeck, first published in 1604 and containing, amongst others, biographies of important Netherlandish painters. Pope Pius V appointed him court painter in 1570. He was summoned to Vienna by Maximilian II, Holy Roman Emperor, who died soon after his arrival in 1576.

Maximilian II's successor Rudolf II was even more keen to employ him. In 1581 he was appointed court painter and also valet de chambre after the court had moved its seat to Prague. There he remained until his death in 1611, shortly before Rudolf was deposed. Spranger occupied a house just outside the castle walls.

Just like Anselmus Boetius de Boodt (1550–1632), the Flemish gemologist and physician, the artist developed a close personal relationship with Rudolf and the two spent many days together engaged in conversation. The emperor would regularly visit Spranger's studio. He bestowed on Spranger the coat of arms of a liegeman in 1588 and granted him a hereditary title in 1595. In the meantime, Spranger supplied the emperor with a continuous stream of paintings of mythological scenes with nudes drawn from nature as well as propaganda pieces which extolled the virtues of Rudolf as a ruler. An example of a work combining the two elements of eroticism and propaganda is the Allegory of the virtues of Rudolf II (Kunsthistorisches Museum) which shows Bellona (the Roman goddess of war) sitting on a globe surrounded by Venus, Amor, Athene and Baccus and emblems symbolising Hungary and the Croatian river Sava. The propagandic message is that the empire is safe with Rudolf at the helm. Thanks to the emperor's patronage, Spranger became very wealthy and owned many properties by the time he died.

Spranger married Christina Müller, the daughter of a rich jeweller from Prague in 1582. His wife died in 1600 after all their children had died. This sad story is depicted in Aegidius Sadeler's Portrait of Bartholomeus Spranger with an Allegory on the Death of his Wife.

== Work ==
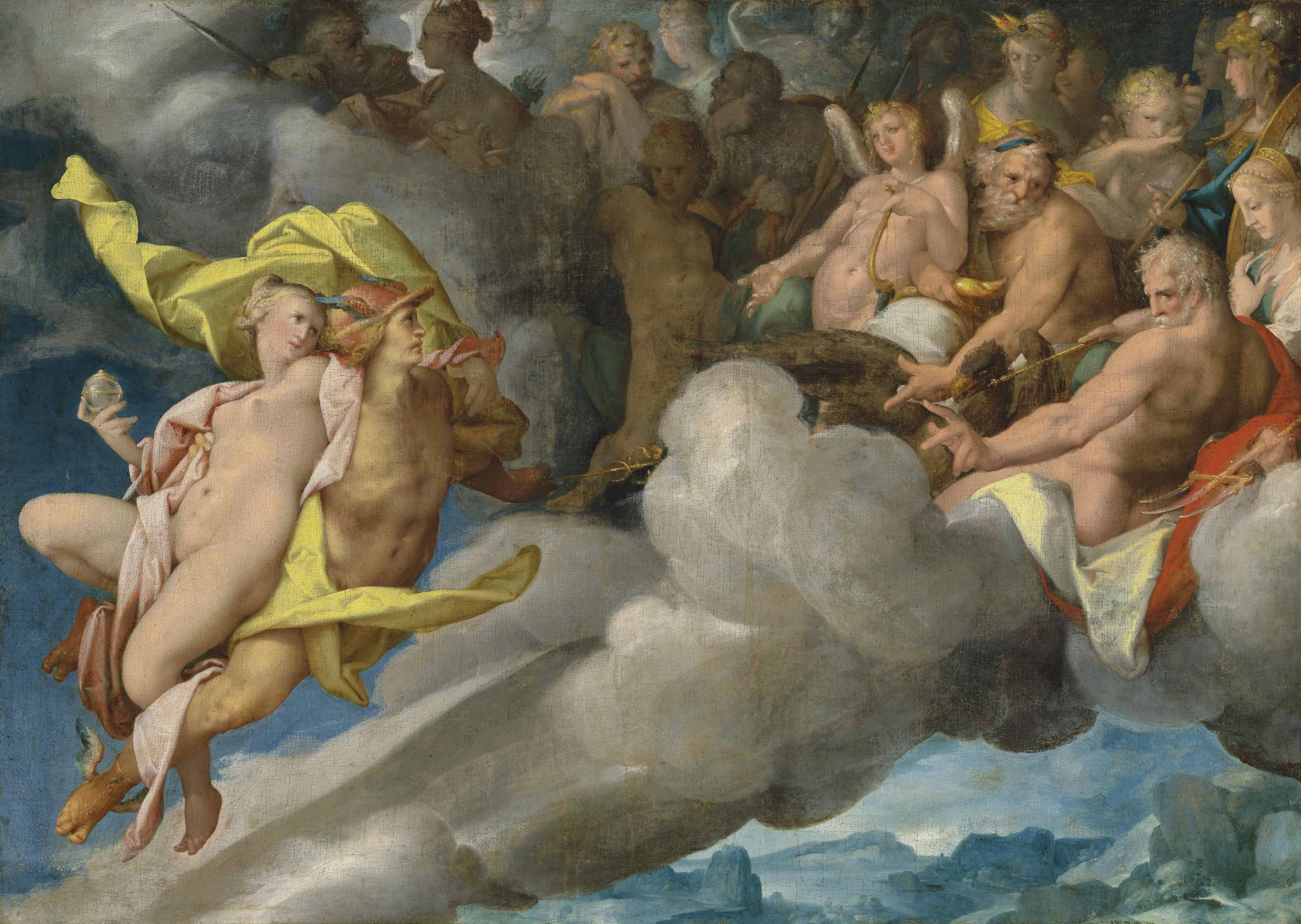
Mercury Carrying Psyche to Mount Olympus

Spranger's paintings for Rudolf mostly depict mythological nudes in various complex poses, with some connection to the Emperor's esoteric Late-Renaissance philosophical ideas. His paintings are the most characteristic of the final phase of Northern Mannerism. By far the best collection is in Vienna. His drawings have great energy, in a very free technique.

Spranger also worked as a sculptor. He may have acquired his knowledge of sculpture through his collaboration with the Flemish sculptor Hans Mont, who also worked at the Prague court. After Mont left the Prague court, Spranger appears to have worked intermittently as a sculptor for the emperor, at least until Adriaen de Vries arrived in Prague in 1601. A terracotta relief of the "Body of Christ Supported by an Angel" (Courtauld Gallery) is by his hand. The Walters Museum holds a bronze "Achelous and Deianeira" which is attributed to him. There is no record of any sculpture by Spranger in Rudolf II's collection.

Aegidius Sadeler, who lived in his house in Prague for some time, and Hendrik Goltzius made engravings of his paintings, spreading Spranger's fame around Europe.

== Collections ==
Much the best collection is in the Kunsthistorisches Museum in Vienna, mostly from the Imperial collection. Most museum print rooms have examples of his prints - he featured heavily in the British Museum's 2022 exhibition on art at Rudolf's court, for instance. There are three oil paintings by Spranger in the Blanton Art Museum in Austin, Texas (Saint Catherine, Saint Ursula, Saint Margaret), along with Memento mori in the Wawel Castle Museum in Kraków, Poland and Epitaph of Nicolas Müller, Goldsmith of Prague in the National Gallery Prague.
