= Ramiro Arrue =

Spanish painter

- Basques jouant aux cartes (Basques Playing Cards), c. 1919. Bilbao Fine Arts Museum.
- Born: Ramiro Arrue y Valle; 20 May 1892; Bilbao, Spain
- Died: 1 April 1971 (aged 78); Saint-Jean-de-Luz, France
- Education: Académie de la Grande Chaumière
- Years active: 1910s–1960s
- Known for: Founder of the Musée Basque in Bayonne; leading painter of the Basque Country
- Style: Figurative
- Spouse: Suzanne
- Awards: Gold medal, Exposition Internationale des Arts Décoratifs (1925)

Ramiro Arrue y Valle (20 May 1892 – 1 April 1971) was a Spanish Basque painter, illustrator and ceramist whose work is strongly associated with the Basque Country. He was a co-founder of the Musée Basque in Bayonne and is regarded as one of the most representative painters of the region.

== Biography ==
Ramiro Arrue was born in Bilbao, into an artistic family: his three older brothers, Alberto, Ricardo, and José, were also artists and frequently held joint exhibitions with him. He also had two sisters. Their father, Lucas Arrue, was an art collector who sold his collections (including a Goya) to pay for the artistic training of his sons. At the age of nineteen, Ramiro travelled to Paris to take courses at the Académie de la Grande Chaumière. Living in Montparnasse, he became an associate of his countrymen Ignacio Zuloaga and Paco Durrio, as well as the sculptor Antoine Bourdelle, who became a close friend. He was also associated with Picasso, Modigliani, and Jean Cocteau. In 1911, Arrue exhibited at the Salon des Artistes français.

In 1922, along with his friends Philip Veyrin and Commandant William Boissel, he founded the Musée Basque at Bayonne.

In 1925 Arrue won a gold medal at the Exposition Internationale des Arts Decoratifs. He exhibited in Bayonne, Pau, Strasbourg, Bilbao, and Cordoba. Along with his brother José, he travelled and exhibited in South America, to Buenos Aires and Montevideo. He often, however, returned to the Basque Country, particularly to Saint-Jean-de-Luz, where he settled in 1917 and where he found his main inspiration for landscapes, portraits, and everyday scenes. In 1929, he married Suzanne; they went on honeymoon in St. Tropez.

Arrue produced illustrations for Francis Jammes (La Noce basque), Pierre Loti (Ramuntcho), Joseph Peyré (Jean le basque), and Jean Poueigh (Le Folklore des Pays d'oc). He also designed sets and costumes for the Bordeaux Opera's production Perkain, and produced many murals.

In 1943, Ramiro Arrue, who had not become a naturalized French citizen, was arrested with other Spanish Basques and imprisoned in the fortress of Saint-Jean-Pied-de-Port. He resumed painting after the war.

The end of Arrue's life was marred by loneliness and financial hardship. He died in Saint-Jean-de-Luz in April 1971 of lung cancer.

Ramiro Arrue remains one of the most representative painters of the Basque Country. His style is figurative, featuring simple lines with an almost monumental quality and muted colour harmonies. The academic Hélène Saule-Sorbé wrote: "The colours of Ramiro Arrue's brush are a trilogy: green, white, red. The permanence of heraldry, a sign of belonging, the palette of a country of green hills, of bright white houses whose roofs and woodwork is red."

== Sources ==
- Muriel Scholle,Ramiro Arrue (1892-1971), in Pyrenees, No. 152, 1987
- Pays Basque (August–September–October 1996)
- Ramiro Arrue, peintre basque: A book by Maria de Isasi in collaboration with Olivier Ribeton
