= Epitaph of Nicolas Müller, Goldsmith of Prague =

Painting by Bartholomeus Spranger

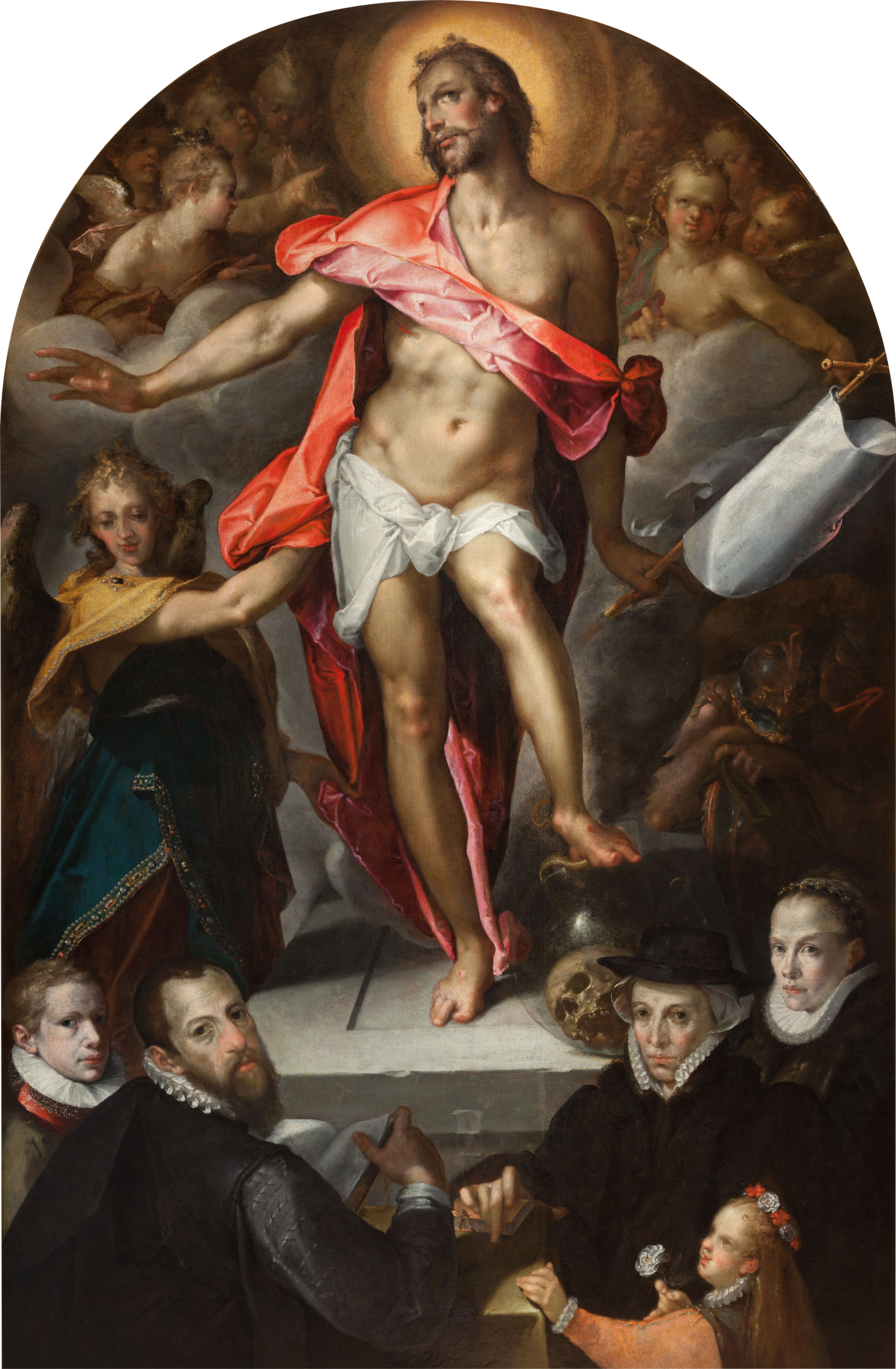
Epitaph of Nicolas Müller, Goldsmith of Prague (c. 1592-1593) by Bartholomeus Spranger

Epitaph of Nicolas Müller, Goldsmith of Prague is a c.1592-1593 oil on canvas painting by Bartholomeus Spranger, now in the National Gallery Prague, which bought it in 1936 and displays it in the Schwarzenberg Palace in Hradčany.

At its base from left to right are Mikuláš's son Jakub, Mikuláš Müller himself, a small girl in more colourful clothing than the rest (perhaps Müller's granddaughter, the daughter of his daughter Christina and Spranger himself), Müller's wife Julian and his daughter Christina.

It was originally sited in the funerary chapel dedicated to Saint Mark within the Romanesque Utraquist church of sv. Jana Křtitele in the settlement of Obora in Malá Strana. The church was secularised in 1784 and demolished ten years later, with its paintings and fittings sold off. The painting was later thought to be missing or have been destroyed, only being rediscovered in the early 20th century in the Čermák family tomb in the Olšany Cemetery.
