= Marc Duval (priest) =

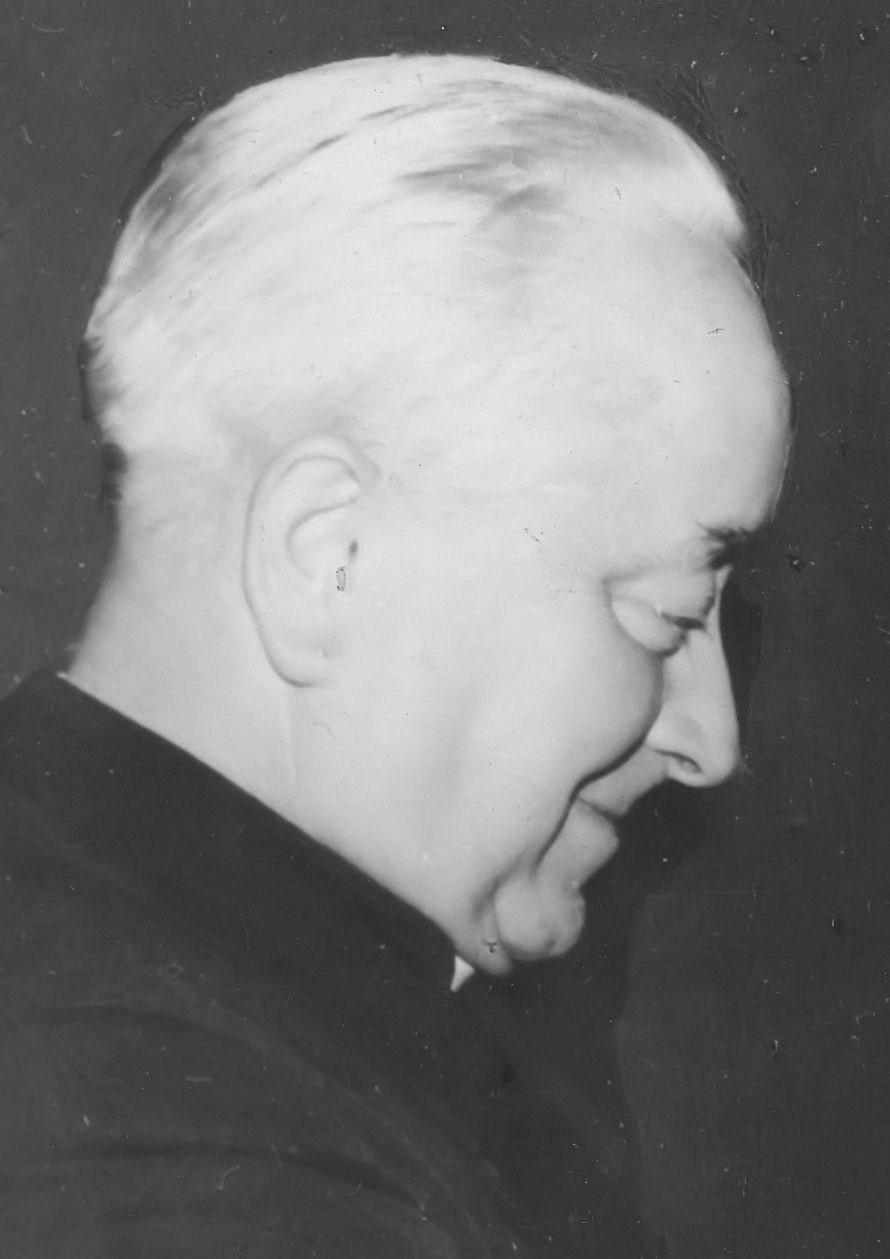

Marc Duval (12 July 1903 - 28 November 1987) was a French Spiritan Roman Catholic priest, most notable as director general of Orphelins Apprentis d'Auteuil (OAA) in Paris from 1942 to 1962.

== Life ==
Born in Le Mans, his initial wish to be a missionary to Africa led him to the Spiritans, taking his religious profession on 17 September and being ordained a priest in Rome on 28 July 1925. Initially chancellor to the French seminary in Rome, he was then summoned to be the Spiritans' procurator general to the Holy See from 1940 to 1942. He served as a lieutenant-aviator in the French Air Force during World War Two.

As OAA's director general, he founded the maison Saint-Louis and fifteen other hospices or "maisons d'accueil" as well as founding the Servantes de Sainte Thérèse to staff them. Among other roles he also served as almoner-general to the Guides de France and from 1964 to 1987 as vicar of the parish of Saint-Honoré-d'Eylau in Paris. He also founded a priestly seminary in Auteuil and put in the first request for Daniel Brottier to be beatified.

He died at the OAA's maison Saint-Louis - Le Mazet in Saint-Just-le-Martel. His funeral took places at the Sainte-Thérése chapel on 2 December and he was buried at the Cimetière parisien d'Ivry the following day.

== Honours ==
- Chevalier de la Légion d'honneur
