= Museo de Bellas Artes de Bilbao =

Bilbao Fine Arts Museum
- Bilboko Arte Ederren Museoa; Museo de Bellas Artes de Bilbao
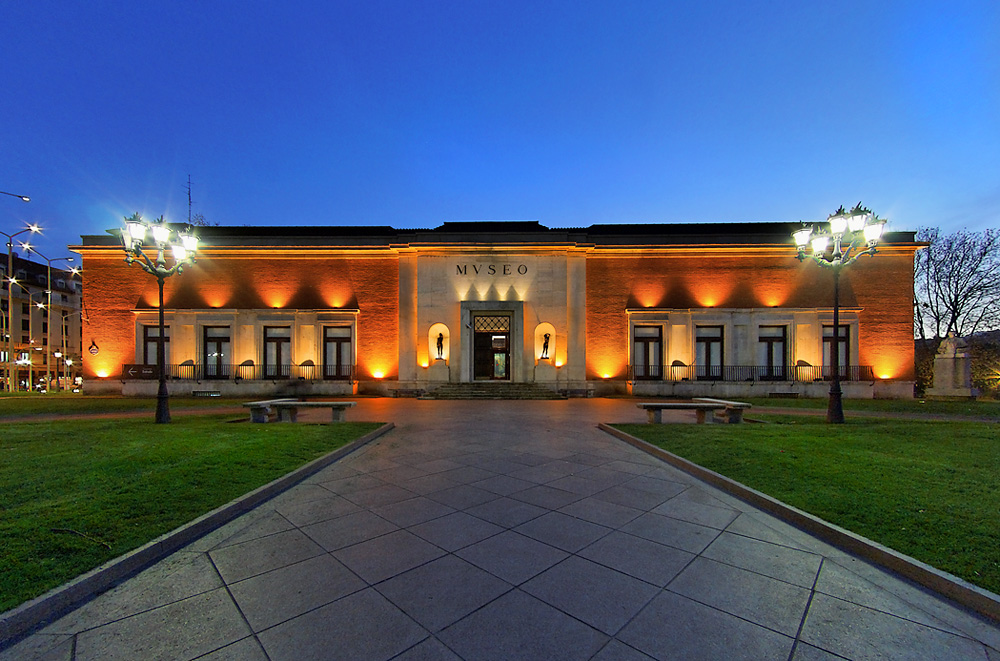
- Front façade
- Established: 1914
- Location: Bilbao, Spain
- Coordinates: 43°15′58″N 2°56′16″W
- Type: Art museum
- Collection size: 10,000 items, 600 part of the exhibition
- Visitors: 211,848 (2025)
- Director: Miguel Zugaza
- Public transit access: Eliptikoa; Abandoibarra; Guggenheim
- Website: museobilbao.com

The Bilbao Fine Arts Museum (Spanish: Museo de Bellas Artes de Bilbao, Basque: Bilboko Arte Ederren Museoa) is an art museum located in the city of Bilbao, Spain. The building of the museum is located entirely inside the city's Doña Casilda Iturrizar Park.

It is the second largest museum in the Basque Country, after the Bilbao Guggenheim Museum and one of the largest Spanish museums outside Madrid. It houses a varied collection including Basque, Spanish and European art from the Middle Ages to contemporary, including paintings by old masters like El Greco, Cranach, Jan Gossaert, Sofonisba Anguissola, Orazio Gentileschi, Murillo, Goya, Luis Paret, Van Dyck, Ruisdael and Bellotto, together with 19th century and modern: Gustave Doré, Bouguereau, Sorolla, Mary Cassatt, Paul Gauguin, Henri Le Sidaner, James Ensor, Jacques Lipchitz, Peter Blake, Francis Bacon and Richard Serra.

== History ==
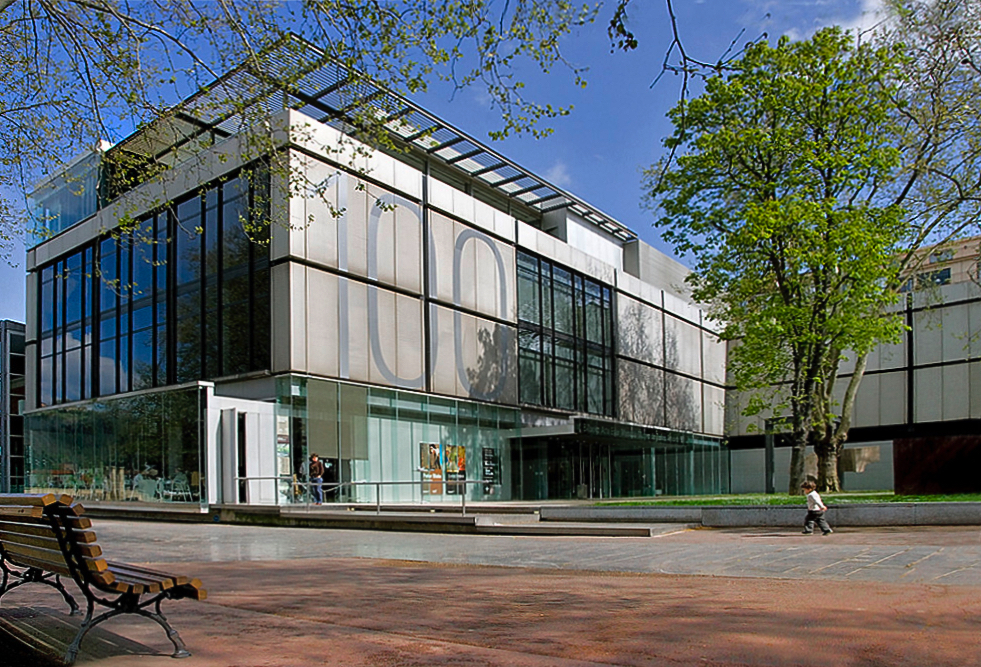
The modern building and main entrance to the museum.

The Museum of Fine Arts in Bilbao was established in 1908. After moving through various venues, the final headquarters were built in 1945, in a great neoclassical building that was to undertake paths expansions in 1970 and 2001 to house the growing museum collection.

The collection of the present Bilbao Fine Arts Museum originated with the merger of the collections from the first Museo de Bellas Artes, inaugurated in 1914, and the Museo de Arte Moderno (Museum of Modern Art) in 1924. In 2008 the Museum of Fine Arts of Bilbao reached its century under the slogan "100 Years of History, 10 Centuries of Art".

During more than 100 years of history, the collaboration between civil society, local artists and public institutions has enabled the museum to gather an extensive collection, considered one of the most important and diverse of all Spain. Its creation is taking into account the importance of bequests and donations from diverse patrons and benefactors, as well as the continuous effort of the museum itself to expand through major acquisitions. Since its inception, the interest in establishing a representative artistic compendium has allowed to refine the selection criteria, and, as a result, the museum can offer and present a lengthy art history to its visitors.

=== Aim of the museum ===
In its role as a public cultural entity, the main mission is to collect, preserve, study and exhibit its own collection, pursue their enrichment, maintain services and promote quality activities in order to contribute decisively to the education of the society and projection of the cultural values of the Basque Autonomous Community.

== The institution and its headquarters ==
=== The museum of Fine Arts ===
The Bilbao Fine Arts Museum was established in 1908 and opened in 1914, guided by the will to modernize individuals and adapt to the cultural moment that the city lived. Its main objectives was to provide a space which at that time was considered essential in any modern society and provide historical role models to the local arts community that would help to complete and develop their training. Indeed, the most important impetus for the realization of the project was the contribution by the legacy of an extensive art collection of great value by the entrepreneur and philanthropist Laureano Jado. Jado was followed soon by other major donations of Antonio Plasencia, the House of Meetings of Guernica or the consulate of Bilbao. The Bilbao painter Manuel Losada is also considered one of the main promoters of the museum, and he became the director of the first office in the School of Arts and Crafts Village, located in the building of the former Civil Hospital in Achuri.

=== The museum of Modern Art ===
Through contacts of young artists with other art centers, and thanks mainly to the increasingly common regular schedule of exhibitions of contemporary art, organized on many occasions by the newly created Association of Basque Artists, a growing concern about the so-called "modern art" took place in the social and cultural environment of the city, enabling the creation of another center dedicated solely to contemporary art. Thus, on October 25, 1924 the Museum of Modern Art opened its doors where previously the Conservatory of Music was installed, owned by the council. The new museum was born with a distinctly innovative spirit of its time and, in fact, the updating of the criteria and the risk assumed with the museum initiatives differentiate the Bilbao Fine Arts Museum from the rest of museums located in Spain.

The International Exhibition of 1919, held in the building of "Berastegui schools", was a key factor behind the birth of this initiative. Apart from the relevant list of national and international artists who participated in it, there was also a strong commitment from the organizers with contemporary art, shown with the acquisition by the Council of a significant set of pieces such as the work of Cassatt, Gauguin, Sidaner, Cottet, Serusier, and Spanish Anglada Camarasa, Nonell and Canals among others, and eventually entering the museum collection. Following the tradition of the directors-artists, the Basque painter Aurelio Arteta would be named director, who remained in front of it until the outbreak of the Civil War in 1936.

=== The new building ===
The war affected unequally to the two museums. While the Museum of Fine Arts moved to Deposito Franco Uribitarte in Bilbao, works in the Museum of Modern Art were expatriated. The recovery of the works was an urgent determination of the new power and once achieved that goal a new need emerged to study a different location for the museum. The same year 1939 when the war ended, the County Council and the City Council reached an agreement to jointly fund the construction of the new building in the so-called park of the Three Nations (current Doña Casilda Park).

The building, designed by the young architect Fernando Urrutia and Gonzalo Cárdenas, and probably inspired by the great historical museums including the Prado with neoclassic forms, combining stone and red brick. The work was completed in 1945 and in 1962 was declared "Monumento Nacional".

=== Extensions of the museum ===
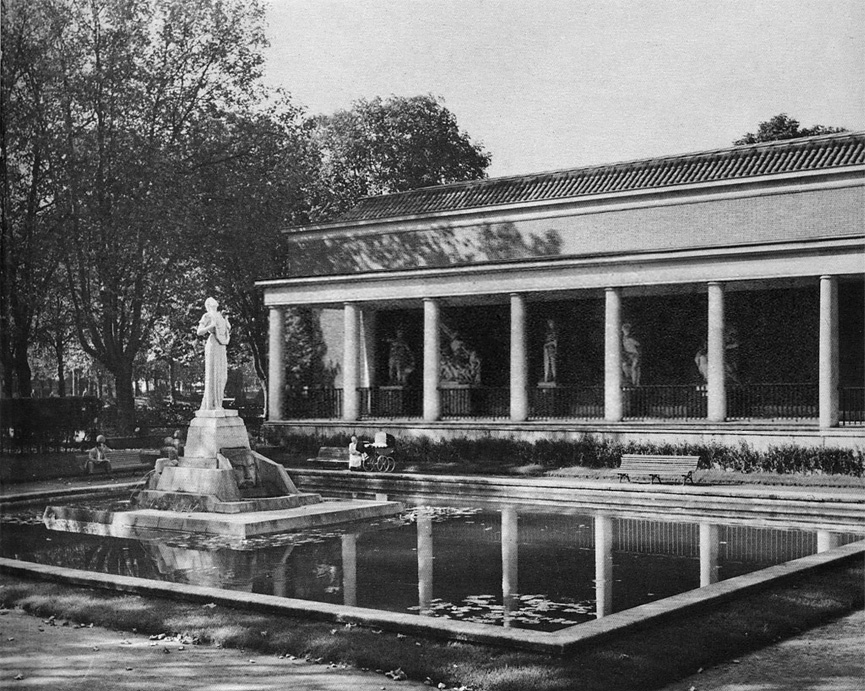
View of the atrium in its new location.

With the aim of adding a new wing to the neoclassical building, the architects Alvaro Lebanon and Ricardo de Beascoa Jauregui reformed the museum with minimalist lines and modern materials such as metal and glass. This new architecture was inaugurated in 1970, staying since the contemporary art section.

The museum has also undertaken various works of enlargement and improvement to enable new spaces and facilities (exhibition hall, auditorium, cabinet graphics) and the provision of new services (Restoration Department, Cataloguing, Documentation and Education, as well as a library, film library, bookstore and cafeteria).

In the late nineties proprietary institutions such as the Bilbao City Council, the Provincial Council of Vizcaya and the Basque Government, aware of the growing importance of cultural facilities in the city, promoted the "Reform and Expansion Plan" at the Museum. In 1996, under the direction of Miguel Zugaza and pursuing the improvement of facilities and services, a link between the original building and its extension was added, respecting the existing architectures. In addition, to gain space for the expansion of visitor services and exhibition spaces, the entrances to the museum were also modified, placing them in the reformed Square Monument to Arriaga and the new "Plaza Chillida". The works were completed in November 2001.

=== Recent history ===
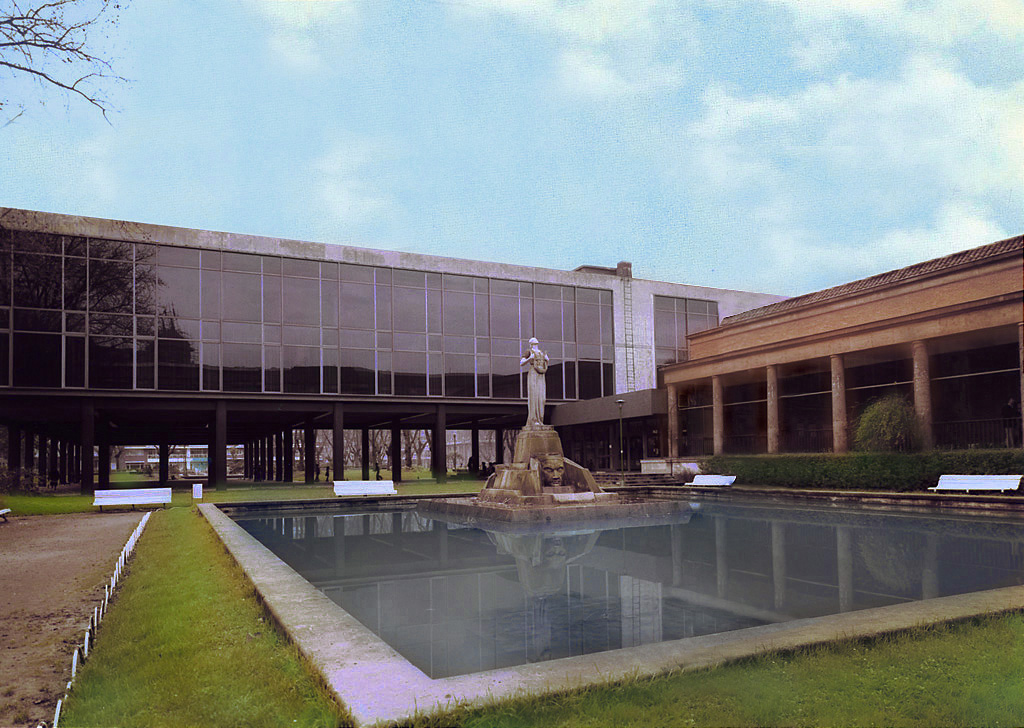
First extension. View of the modern building, year 1971.

In December 2000, the institutions agreed to create the Bilbao Fine Arts Museum Foundation. The governing body is the Board, in which representatives of the institutions are integrated with other natural or legal persons who, for their input or knowledge of the museum activity, promote the achievement of foundational purposes. In October 2008, under the slogan "100 years of history, 10 centuries of art", the Bilbao Fine Arts Museum celebrated its centenary.

In May 2009, the mayor of Bilbao Iñaki Azkuna publicly commented on the opportunity to undertake further expansions. Due to the difficulties and limitations of extending the building once again, a second placement was found where the newest art pieces are still stored.

Today the museum has a total area of 13,914 m2, of which 5,089 are distributed in 33 rooms for the permanent collection, temporary exhibitions in 1142 and the rest in domestic and care visitor services. Miguel Zugaza, formerly director of the Prado Museum, is currently director of the museum since 2017.

In 2019, architecture firms Foster + Partners and LM Urirate were selected over six other teams to design the future expansion and remodeling of the Bilbao Fine Arts Museum. Opened in 2026, the €45 million expansion added over 21,500 sq ft (2,000 m^{2}) of new galleries within an open and flexible floor plan. The extension was funded by the Basque government, the regional government, the provincial council and Bilbao city council in conjunction with the privately-owned BBK Banking Foundation.

== Collection ==
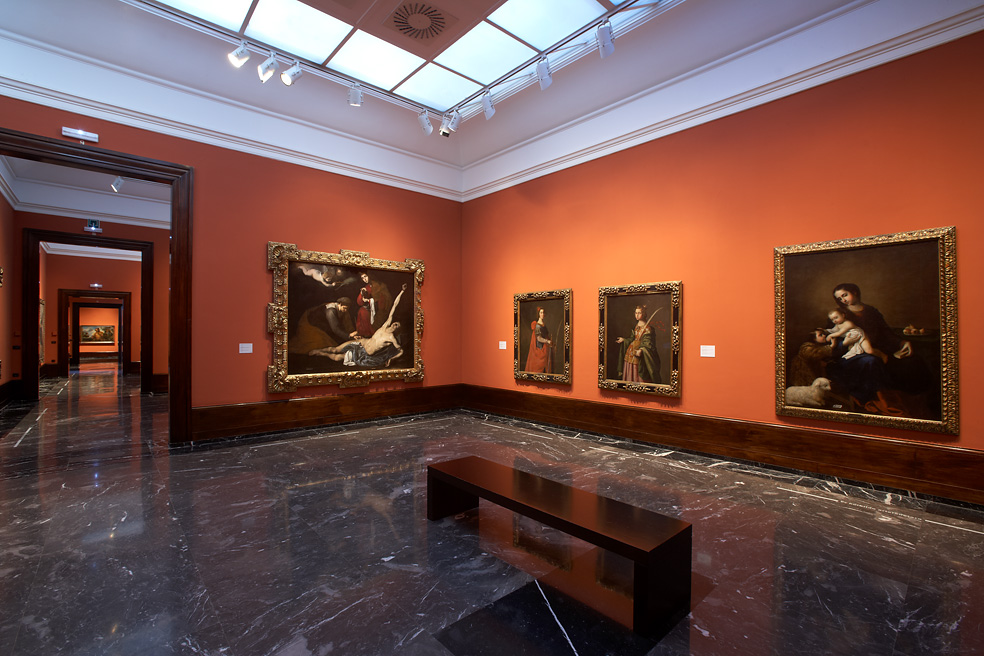
An exhibition room in the old building. On the left, "San Sebastián" painting by Jusepe de Ribera, and on the right, "The Virgin with the Child Jesus and the Child Saint John the Baptist" by Francisco de Zurbarán.

Notable for the lengthy period it covers (from the 12th century to the present day) and the variety of art works acquired since its inception, the Bilbao Fine Arts Museum collection currently boasts more than ten thousand works including 1,500 paintings, 400 sculptures, more than 6,500 works on paper and 1,000 pieces of art applied.

These works are spread over 33 rooms corresponding to the permanent exhibition, and the museum's collection is divided into five main sections: ancient art, modern and contemporary art, Basque art, works on paper and applied arts. The collection combines classical art, contemporary art and creations by Basque artists, as well as a small display of applied arts.

The backbone of the collection is the Spanish school whose ancient and modern examples of Basque art are also part of the contemporary age. The broad representation of other schools such as the Flemish and Dutch during the 15th - 17th centuries, unique works of the Italian school, as well as some examples of Avant-garde and Post-Impressionism provide Spanish and Basque art with an international context.

The collection combines classical art (Cranach, El Greco, Van Dyck, Goya), contemporary art (Bacon, Kitaj, Serra and Tàpies) and creations by Basque artists (Regoyos, Zuloaga and Echevarría), as well as a small display of applied arts. The exhibition is presented in chronological order, and covers the period from the 17th century to the present day. The collection contains over 10,000 works composed by 1,500 paintings, 400 sculptures, more than 6,500 works on paper and 1,000 pieces of art applied.

=== Permanent collection ===
The collection of the Bilbao Fine Arts Museum gathers a substantial heritage of more than 10,000 pieces: approximately 1,500 paintings, 400 sculptures, more than 6,500 works on paper and a thousand pieces of applied arts. It also preserves relevant examples of some of the major European schools, from the 18th century to the present day, and other rare collections. These include the Palace collection of Oriental art, the pottery collection of Manises of the 14th-16th centuries, or the Taramona-Basabe collection of Etruscan bronzes, Italic, Roman and Iberian, whose chronology goes back to the 6th century BC.

The Flemish and Dutch painting schools are of particular interest, with renowned works of Gossart, Benson and Coecke, Mandijn, Vredeman de Vries, De Vos, Jordaens, Van Dyck, Grebber or Ruisdael. In 2012 the museum has added an important example of Lucas Cranach the Elder: Lucretia (1534). It also has the largest collection from Basque artists, becoming the maximum reference institution due to its artistic and documentary heritage, research tradition and proximity to the artists.

It is worth mentioning the variety of works on paper, prints and engravings by Albrecht Dürer, Van Meckenem, Georg Pencz, Goltzius, Rembrandt, Sandrart, Piranesi, Goya, Fortuny, Carlos de Haes, Cézanne, Picasso, Duchamp, Lipchitz, Utamaro, Hokusai, Rouault, Hockney, Allen Jones, Immendorff, Bacon and Antonio Saura, among others.

The museum’s collection includes works by Bermejo, Benson, Mandijn, Vredeman de Vries, Lucas Cranach the Elder, De Vos, Anthonis Mor, Alonso Sánchez Coello, Sofonisba Anguissola, El Greco, Pourbus, Gentileschi, Ribera, Zurbarán, Van Dyck, Murillo, Arellano, Meléndez, Bellotto, Mengs, Goya, Paret, Villaamil, Gustave Doré, Ribot, Zamacois, Madrazo, Gauguin, Cassatt, Sorolla, Iturrino, Ensor, Regoyos, Romero de Torres, Zuloaga, Sunyer, Gutiérrez Solana, Daniel Vázquez Díaz, Lipchitz, Delaunay, González, Gargallo, Bacon, Palazuelo, Oteiza, Appel, Chillida, Caro, Serra, Millares, Tàpies, Saura, Lüpertz, Kitaj, Blake, Arroyo and Barceló, among others.

=== Essential works ===
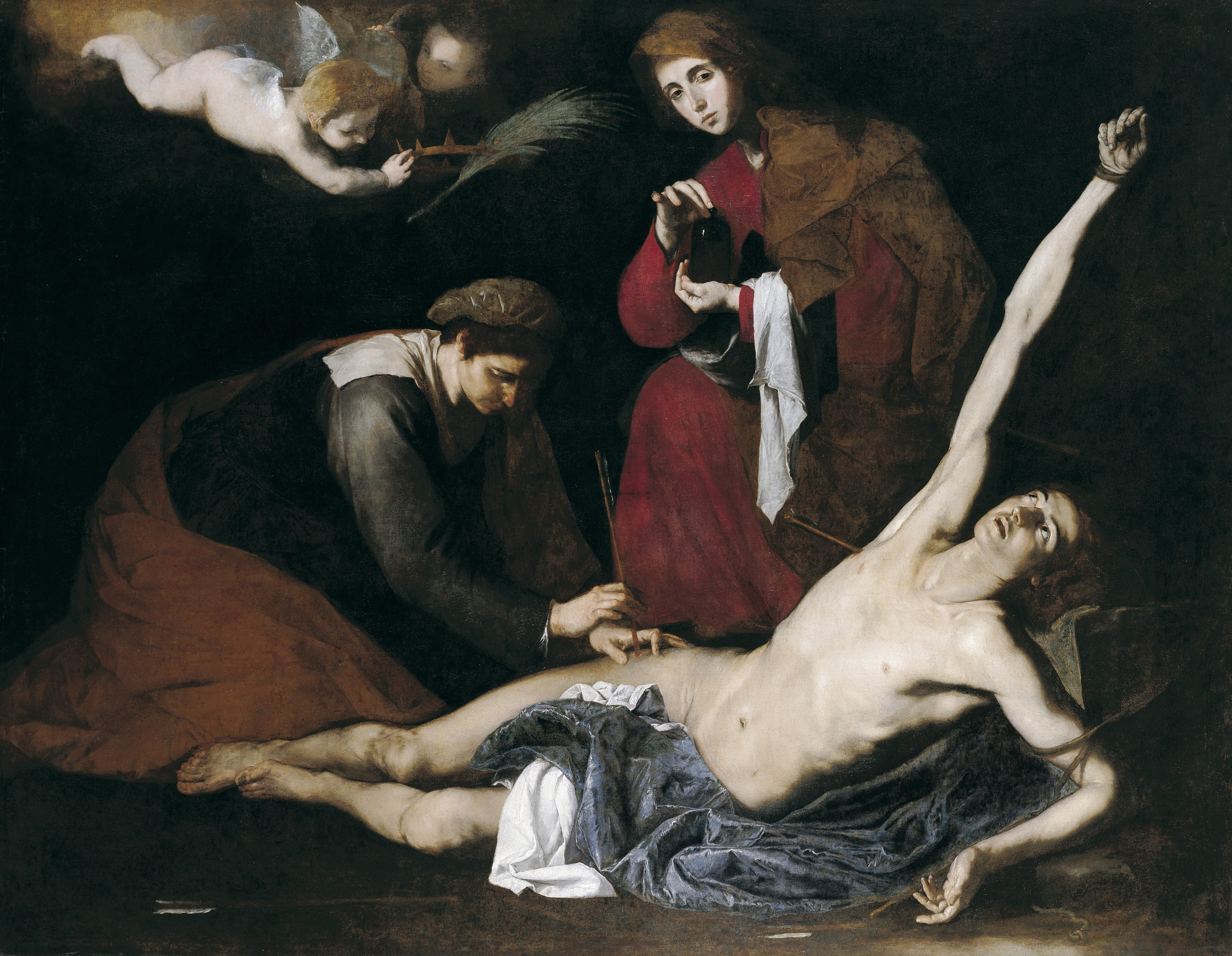
José de Ribera - St. Sebastian cured by the Holy Women - c. 1621

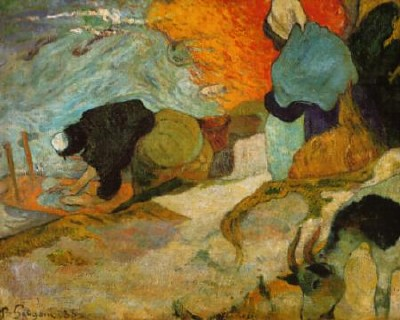
Paul Gauguin- Washerwomen in Arles - c. 1888

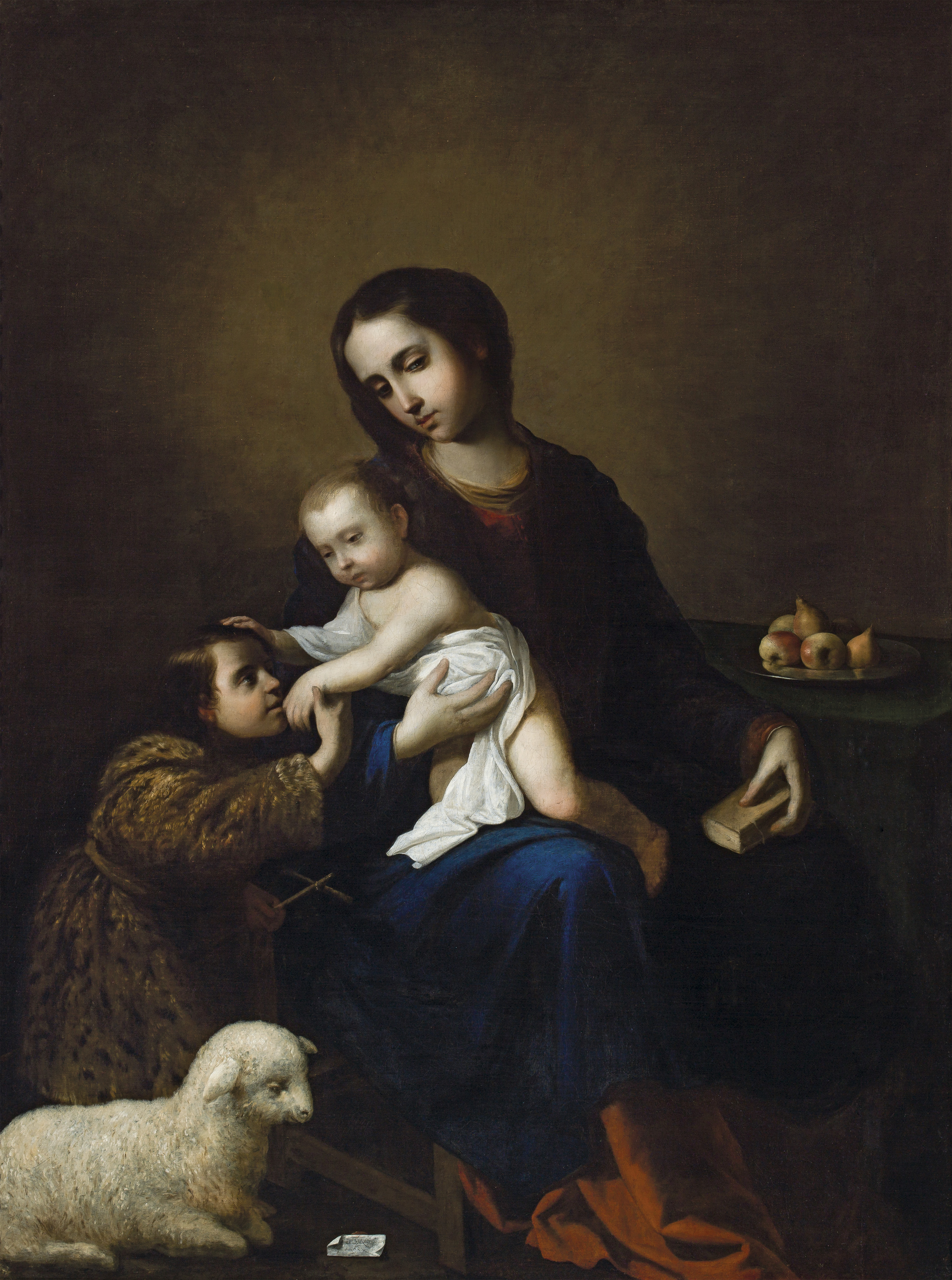
Francisco de Zurbarán - The Virgin with the Child Jesus and the Child St. John - c. 1662

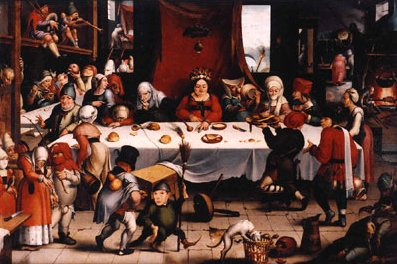
Jan Mandijn - Burlesque Feast - c. 1550

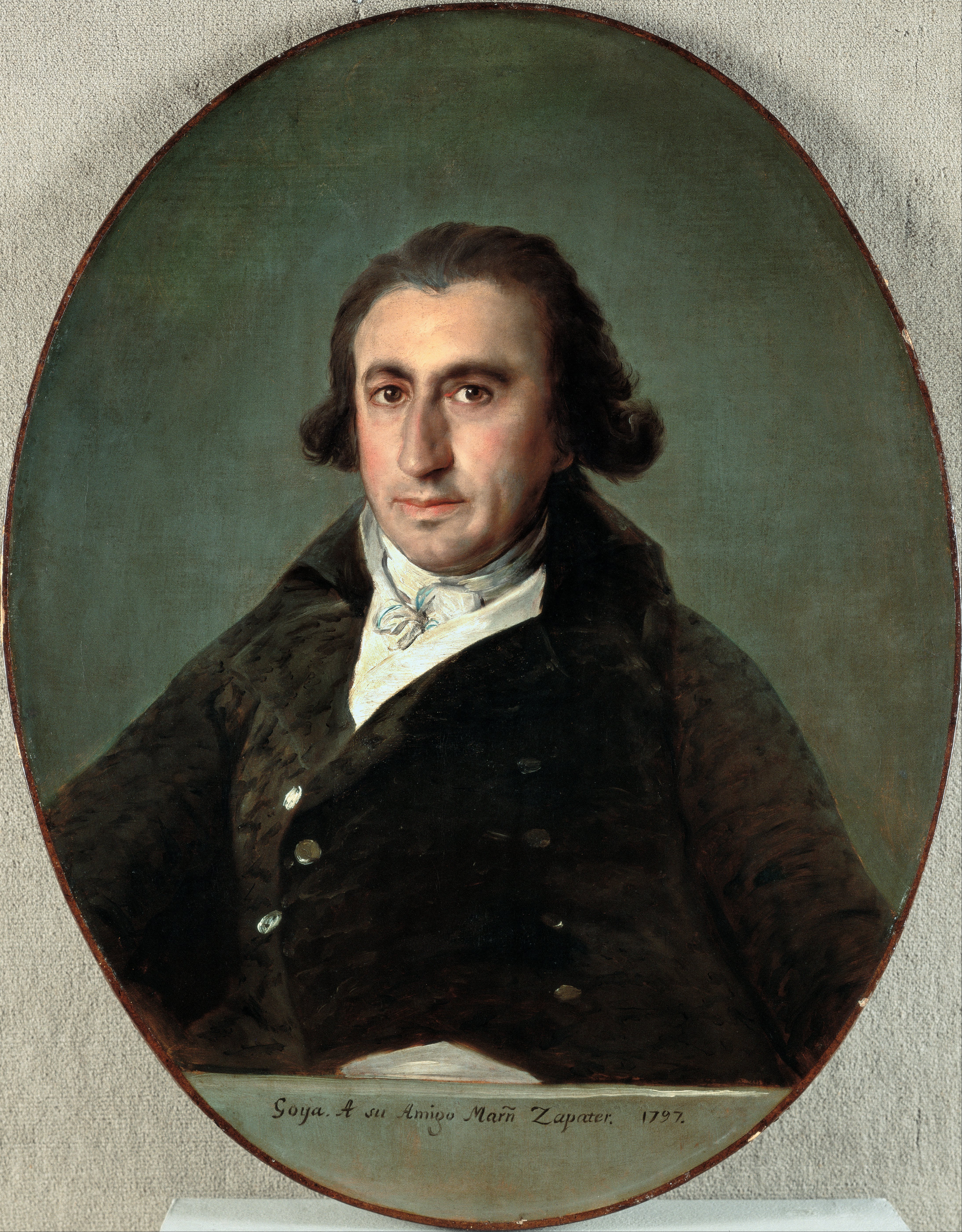
Francisco Goya - Portrait of Martín Zapater - c.1797

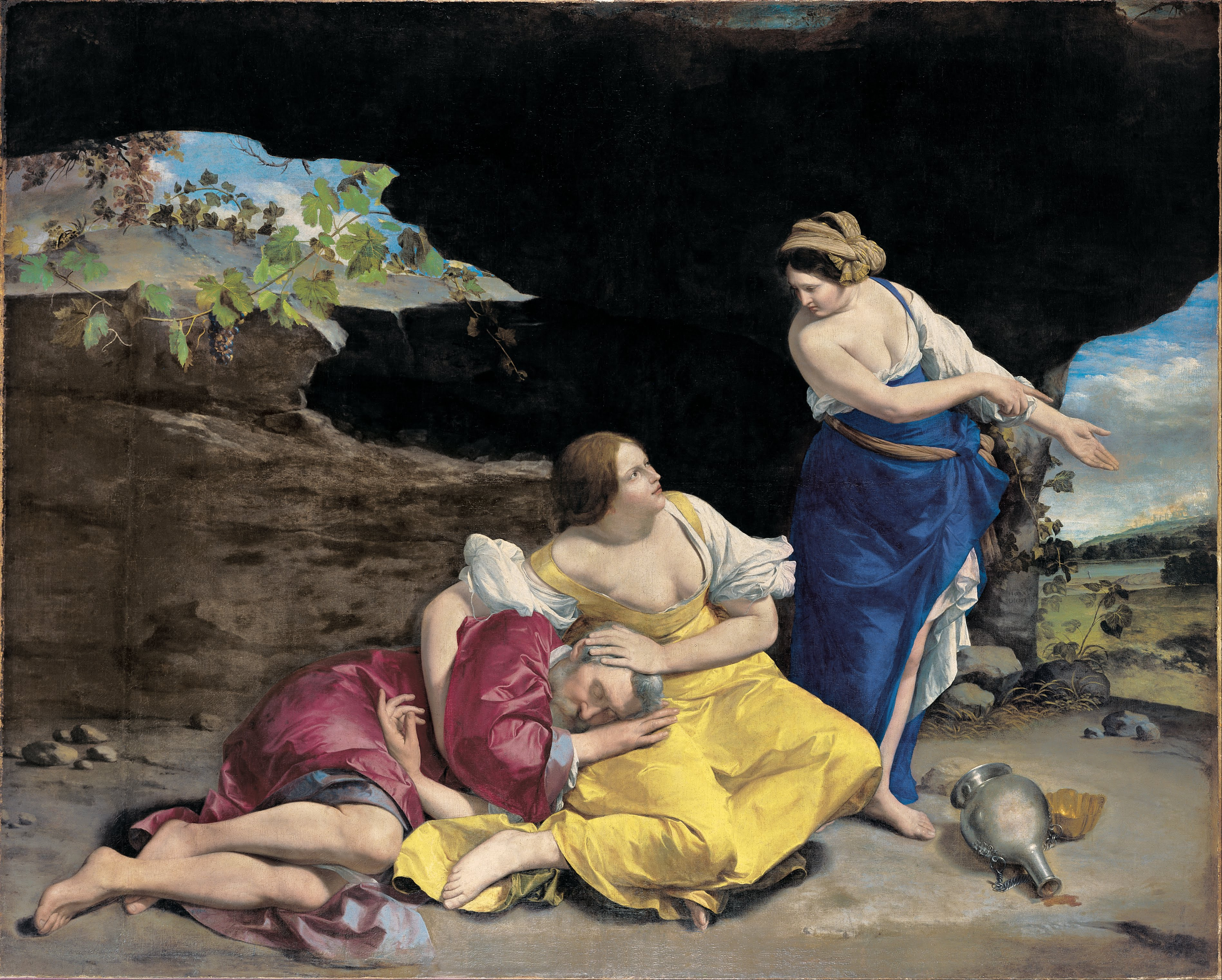
Lot and his Daughters - Orazio Gentileschi-c.1628

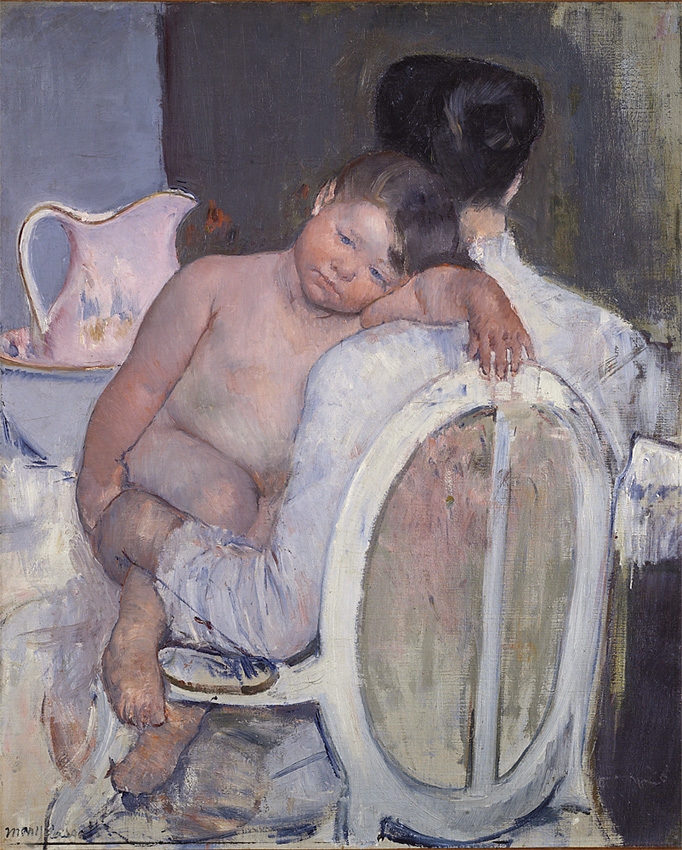
Mary Cassatt - Woman Sitting with a Child in Her Arms - c.1890

- Adolfo Guiard: Village Girl with Red Carnation - c. 1903
- Alberto Sánchez: Figures in a Landscape - c. 1960–1962
- Ambrosius Benson: Pietà at the Foot of the Cross, (fragment) - c. 1530
- Anonymous, Catalan: Descent and The Flood or Noah's Ark - last third of the 13th century
- Anthony van Dyck: Lamentation over the Dead Christ - c. 1634–1640
- Antoni Tàpies: Great Oval or Painting - c. 1955
- Antonis Mor (Anthonis van Dashort): Portrait of Philip II - c. 1549–1550
- Aurelio Arteta: The Bridge at Burceña - c. 1925–1930
- Bartolomé Bermejo: Flagellation of Saint Engracia - c. 1474–1478
- Bartolomé Esteban Murillo: St. Peter in Tears - c. 1650–1655
- Bartolomé Esteban Murillo: St. Lesmes - c. 1655
- Bernardo Bellotto: Landscape with Palace or Architectural Capriccio with Palace - c. 1765–1766
- Darío de Regoyos: Bathing in Rentería. Soir Eléctrique - c. 1899
- Diego de la Cruz: Christ of Pity - c. 1485
- Eduardo Chillida: Around the Vacuum I - c. 1964
- El Greco (Domenikos Theotokópoulos): The Annunciation - c. 1596–1600
- Francis Bacon: Lying Figure in Mirror - c. 1971
- Francisco de Goya: Portrait of Martín Zapater - c. 1797
- Francisco de Zurbarán: The Virgin with the Child Jesus and the Child St. John - c. 1662
- Paco Durrio: Head of Christ - c. 1895–1896
- Ignacio Zuloaga: Portrait of Countess Mathieu de Noailles - c. 1913
- Jan Mandijn (or Mandyn): Burlesque Feast - c. 1550
- Joaquín Sorolla: The Relic - c. 1893
- Jorge Oteiza: Portrait of an armed Gudari (basque soldier) called Odysseus - c. 1975
- José de Ribera: St. Sebastian cured by the Holy Women - c. 1621
- José Gutiérrez Solana: On the Game - c. 1915–1917
- Juan de Arellano: Basket of Flowers - c.1671
- Lucas Cranach the Elder: Lucrecia - c. 1530
- Luis Fernández: Head of Dead Bull - c. 1939
- Luis Meléndez: Still-Life with Fruit and Jug - c. 1773
- Luis Paret y Alcázar: View of the Arenal at Bilbao - c. 1783–1784
- Marten de Vos: The Abduction of Europa - c. 1590
- Mary Cassatt: Woman seated with a child in her arms - c. 1890
- Michel Erhart: Saint Ana, the Virgin and Child - c. 1485–1490
- Orazio Gentileschi: Lot and his Daughters - c. 1628
- Óscar Domínguez: Le Chasseur - c. 1933
- Paul Cézanne: Bathers - c. 1896–1898
- Paul Gauguin: Washerwomen in Arles - c. 1888
- Robert Delaunay: Nude Woman Reading - c. 1920
- Utagawa Kunisada: Kabuki Actor as Wood cutter - c. 1815
