= Jan Mandijn =

Dutch painter

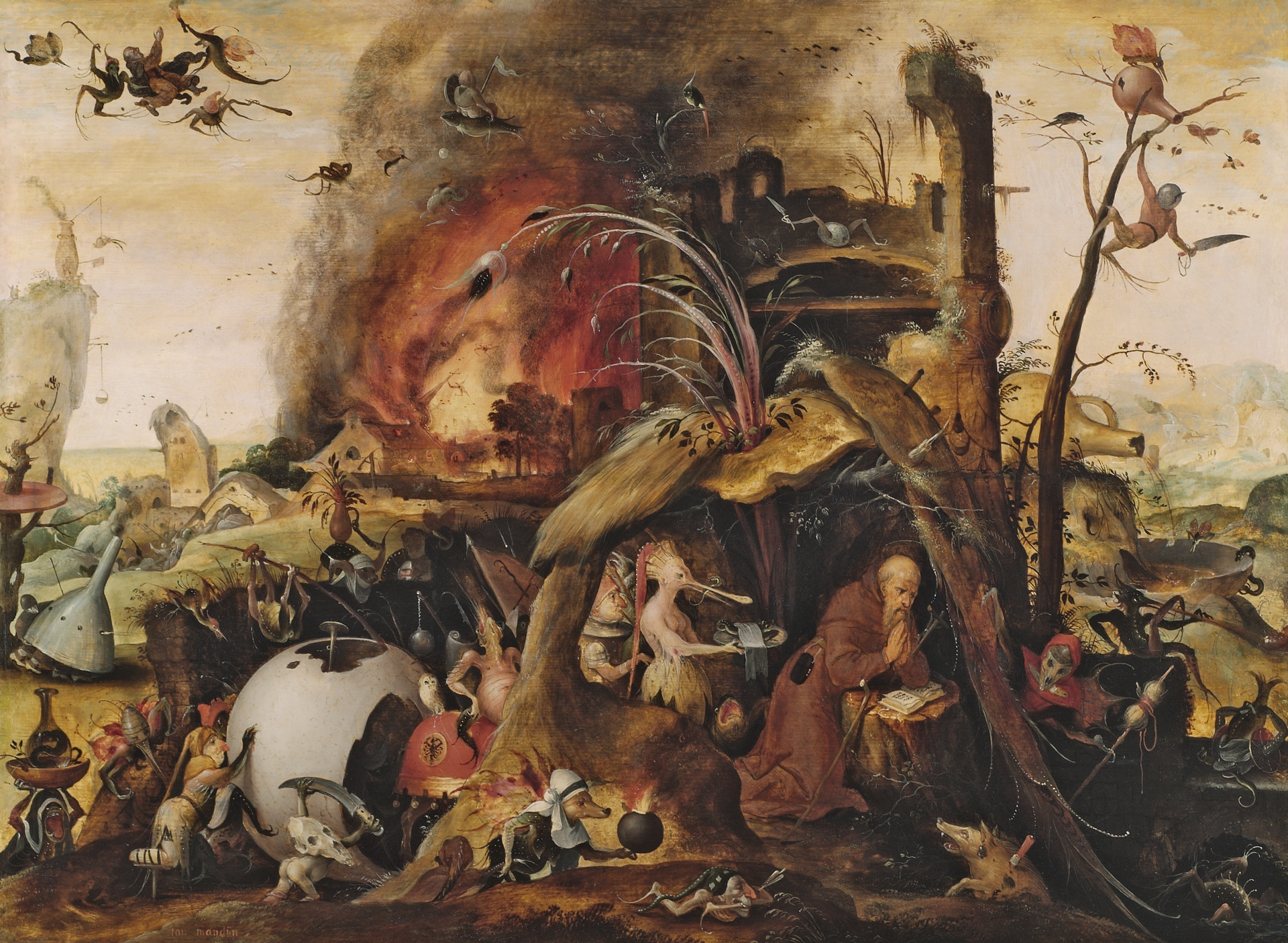
- The temptation of St. Anthony, ca. 1550
- Born: Jan Mandijn; 1500; Haarlem
- Died: 1560 (aged 59–60); Antwerp
- Known for: Painting
- Movement: Renaissance

Jan Mandijn or Jan Mandyn (c. 1500, Haarlem – c. 1560, Antwerp) was a Renaissance painter of the Low Countries, who worked in Antwerp after 1530. He is known for his works with subject matter and style reminiscent of Hieronymus Bosch.

== Biography ==
Mandijn trained in Haarlem. He moved to Antwerp in 1530. Here, he collaborated with the painter Pieter Aertsen, also from the Northern Netherlands. Both painters cleverly exploited the great popularity of the work of the 'devil-maker' Hieronymus Bosch copying and imitating his work with its fantastic and devilish creatures. This genre of work was particularly in demand in Spain. On 20 June 1542 Jan Mandijn, 42 years old and Pieter Aertsen, 34 years old, received a request of the Basque merchant Samson del Barro (Simon del Barco) from Biscay but residing in Antwerp, to quote a price for paintings with subjects from the Bosch repertory, which were apparently destined for the Spanish market.

The Trials of Job, Musée de la Chartreuse de Douai

He was the teacher of Jan van der Elburcht, Gillis Mostaert, Bartholomeus Spranger, Aert de Loose, Ambrosius Smidt, Lucas Verschriecken and Jacob Verstraten. He died in Antwerp.

== Work ==
Only one signed work of Mandijn survives, the Temptation of Saint Anthony (Frans Hals Museum in Haarlem). It is similar in subject matter and style to Hieronymus Bosch. This is why he has been called a follower of Bosch. The early biographer Karel van Mander already wrote that Mandijn was good at painting spooky and funny scenes like Hieronymus Bosch. The 'Temptation' is inspired by Bosch's work. Mandijn's style was, however, more painterly and the colours and fantastic creatures are less harmonious. As a result, the whole is less powerful than Bosch. Mandijn's paintings incorporate the elements typical of Bosch such as hybrid demons composed of various parts of insects, amphibians, reptiles and birds.

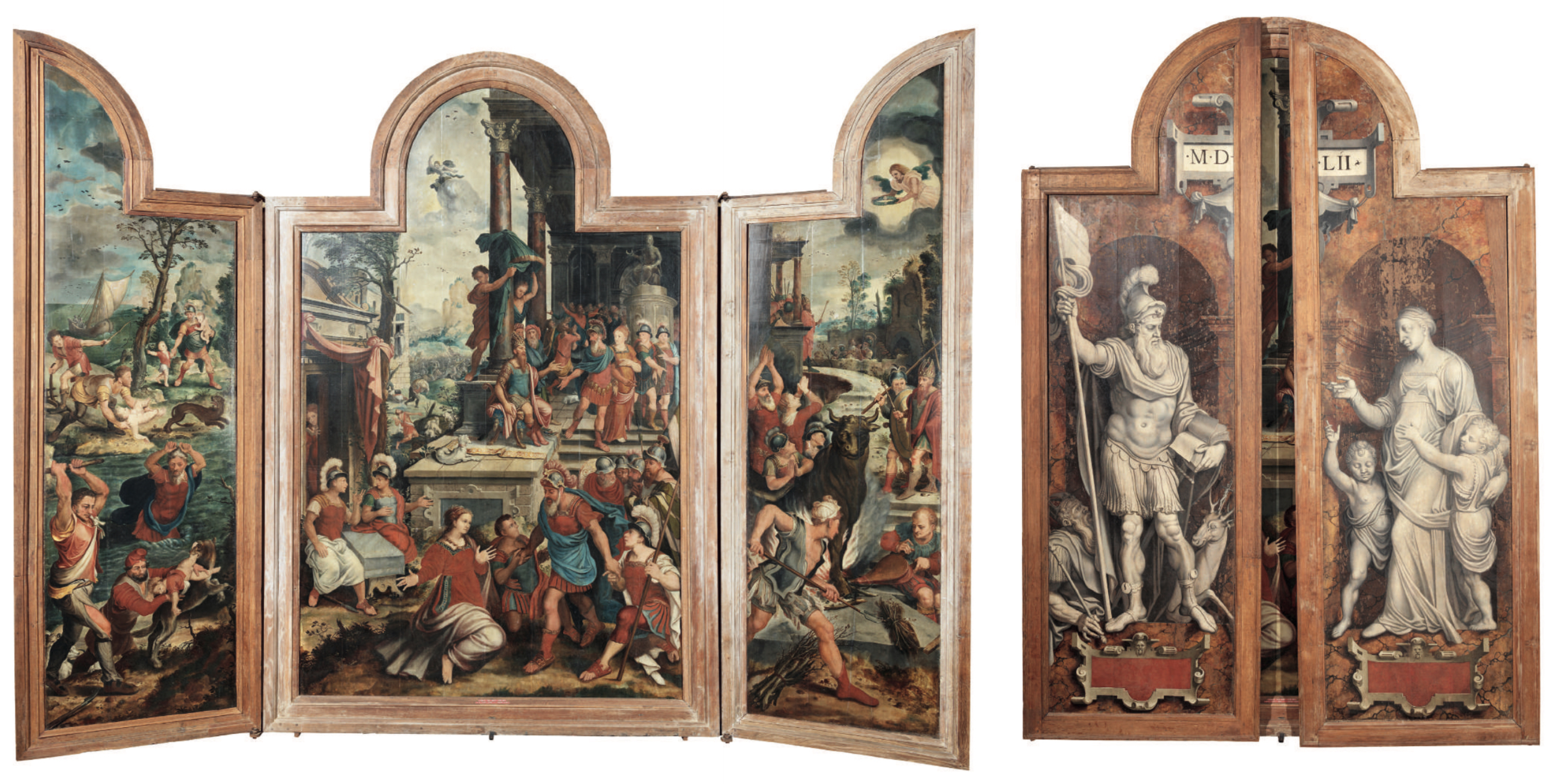
Jan Mandijn, Triptych with scenes from the life of Saint Eustace, 1552. Scherpenheuvel-Zichem, Church of Saint Eustace. The city of Zichem commissioned the altarpiece in 1550.

The stylistic features of Mandijn's style have been identified in a series of Antwerp 'devil pictures' that have been attributed to him, such as the Temptation of Saint Christopher (Alte Pinakothek in Munich). A painting of a Burlesque Feast (Bilbao Fine Arts Museum) has been ascribed traditionally to Jan Mandijn, an attribution which is no longer accepted by art historians Paul Vandenbroeck and Walter Gibson who have given the work to the Mechelen painter Frans Verbeeck.

A recent study showed that Mandijn was also proficient in the "antique" manner. In 1552, for instance, the painter and his workshop completed a monumental altarpiece in a classicizing style for the Church of Saint Eustace in Zichem. The triptych with scenes from the life of Saint Eustace is still preserved in the afore-mentioned church.
