= José Arrue =

Spanish painter (1885–1977)

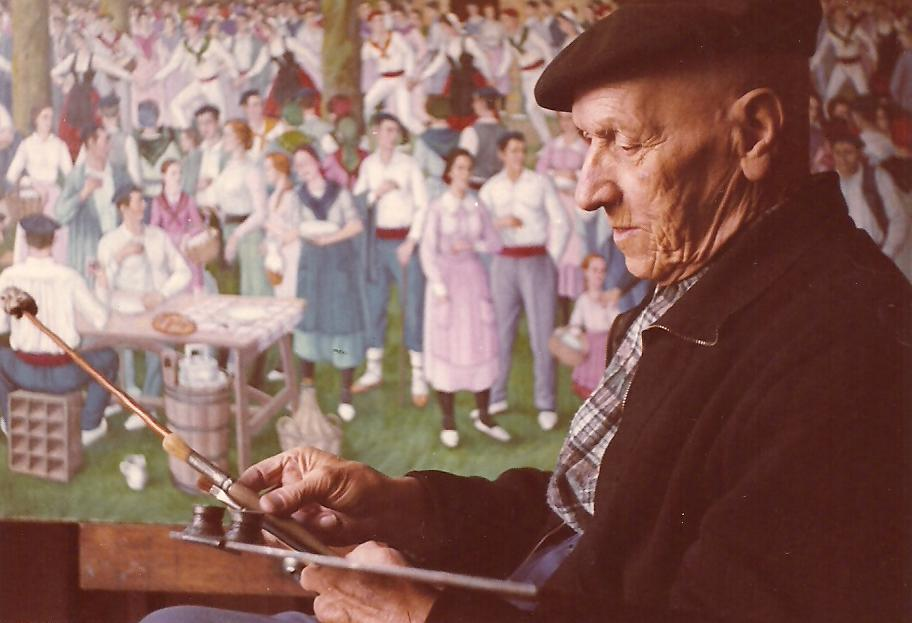
Photo of File:José Arrue in 1971

José Arrue y Valle, usually known as José Arrue (September 1, 1885 – April 6, 1977) was a Basque painter who lived in Spain.

Arrue came from an artistic family: his father, Lucas Arrue, was an art collector, and his three brothers, Alberto, Ramiro, and Ricardo, were also painters. After early studies in Bilbao, he subsequently continued his training in Barcelona, Paris and Milan. In 1908 he returned to his birthplace, and taught figure drawing at the School of Arts and Crafts. He was one of the founders of the weekly El Coitao, and the Association of Basque Artists.

Arrue's love of bullfighting led to his debut in the bullring on October 17, 1909, in Bilbao. According to several authorities, Arrue proved to be a capable matador.

Arrue's painting won several awards during his lifetime. He also designed bullfighting posters, did advertising work, and published cartoons in newspapers such as El Sol and El Liberal, and the Buenos Aires newspaper La Razón; an exhibition of his paintings was staged in Buenos Aires in 1928, later travelling to Montevideo, Uruguay.

During the Spanish Civil War, Arrue drew comics describing events from the perspective of the Basque Government. After the collapse of the Republican Army of the North, and the fall of Santander on September 1, 1937, Arrue was arrested in the city. He was held in Nationalist captivity for two years, during which time he was moved to Orduña prison. He was eventually released in 1940 and went to live in Llodio with his family. Although in semi-retirement from public life, he participated in a number of further exhibitions: a retrospective of his work was held in 1973, and a further one, featuring the work of all of the Arrue brothers, was held in Bilbao in 1977.

Arrue's work is noted for its concrete realism, clear lines and composition, and its focus on Basque subjects, particularly the landscape of the Basque country, its religious festivals, romerias and social rituals, and the lives of its peasantry.

== Sources ==
- José Arrue, Euskomedia

== Bibliography ==
- El Coitao, mal llamao, Javier González de Durana (Bilbao, 1995) ISBN 84-605-3564-9
