= Marc Duval (painter) =

French painter

Marc Duval or Du Val (c. 1530 – 13 September 1581) was a French court painter and printmaker, most notable for his portraits of leaders of the Huguenot faction and as the probable painter of works previously attributed to the "Master of the Portrait of Sébastien de Luxembourg, Viscount of Martigues". For a time he was considered one of France's best draughtsmen and engravers. He worked at the court of the last kings of the Valois dynasty and produced highly valued portraits of them and other nobility in Paris, dying in that city on 13 September 1581, a date he had himself predicted. He was married to Catherine, though her maiden name is unknown, and their daughter remained in Paris and was a talented artist.

== Biography ==
Born in Saint-Vincent near Le Mans, his life is mainly known from references to him by his contemporary François Grude, Senor La Croix du Maine. Grudemade his notes three years after the artist's death, but some of his information is now known to be incorrect. Duval did not appear in Paris's city records before 1572 and cannot have been a court painter before that time. He also states Duval was based on rue Grenelle in Paris, though there are no records of his having had a house there. Grudealso states that he was nicknamed "Bertin" after his father (also a sculptor and artist) and "Sourd" (the French word for deaf, given him by Charles IX of France), but that reference to a Bertrand in documents in 1562 is now not believed to be Duval but his father, whom Grude mistook for his son, with Marc Duval never bearing that nickname. A Duval family tree produced in 1760 calls Bertrand "painter and sculptor to Francis I" and Marc "painter to Henry II".

Grude makes no reference to Marc Duval's religion, though the predominance of paintings of Huguenots in his work has led art historian Louis Dimier to argue that he too was a Protestant and to suggest that he spent a long period in Italy, identifying him as the "Master Marco from France" commissioned at the Palazzo Sacchetti in Rome by Cardinal Ricci in May 1553. Karel Van Mander also mentions an artist in the court of the Queen Mother from Paris named "Marco" as teaching Bartholomeus Spranger drawing in 1565.

The most reliable documents concerning Marc Duval date back to the late 1570s. Based on them, he is now thought to have moved to Paris after some time serving the rulers of Navarre. In 1575 an anonymous author probably belonging to Margaret of Navarre's court dedicated a poem to Duval entitled "Le pourtraict de mon âme" ("Portrait of my friend"). On 19 June 1577 Duval was recorded as witnessing engraver Jean Rabelle's marriage and in 1579 as winning a lawsuit against (and compensation from) Louis de Campania, Comte de la Suz, with the latter document referring to him a "merchant painter living in Paris".

== Attributions ==
A 1579 engraving of the three Coligny brothers after a 1569 drawing probably by Duval is signed "Monsieur du Val". 1579 portraits of Jeanne III d'Albret and Catherine de Medici, probably belonging to the same series and both mentioned by Grude, are also attributed to him.

Some researchers attribute other paintings and prints to him, including the Italian-style one of a blind flautist (1566, Louvre) and individual portraits from the studio of François Clouet such as those of Jean Babou de La Bourdesière (Louvre), admiral Coligny (Musée Condé) Jacques, Duke of Nemours (Musée Condé) and Sébastien, Viscount of Luxembourg-Mortigue (Bemberg Foundation, Toulouse), Dimier also attributed a sketch of Coligny's head to him. In 1970 Jean Adhémar curated the largest-ever exhibition of 16th century French drawings from the prints collection of the Bibliotheque Nationale de France, re-attributing thirteen works to the "Master of the Portrait of Sébastien de Luxembourg, Viscount of Martigues", mostly previously attributed to Clouet or his studio.

== Gallery of possible attributions ==
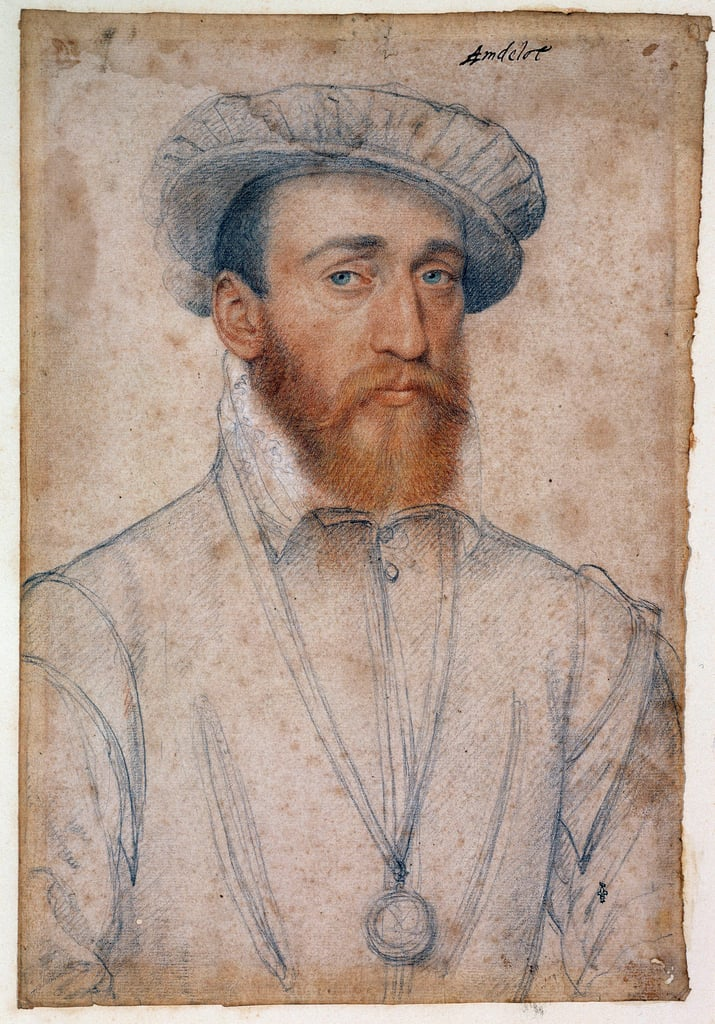
Count François de Coligny d'Andelot. Museum Condé, Chantilly, c. 1555.

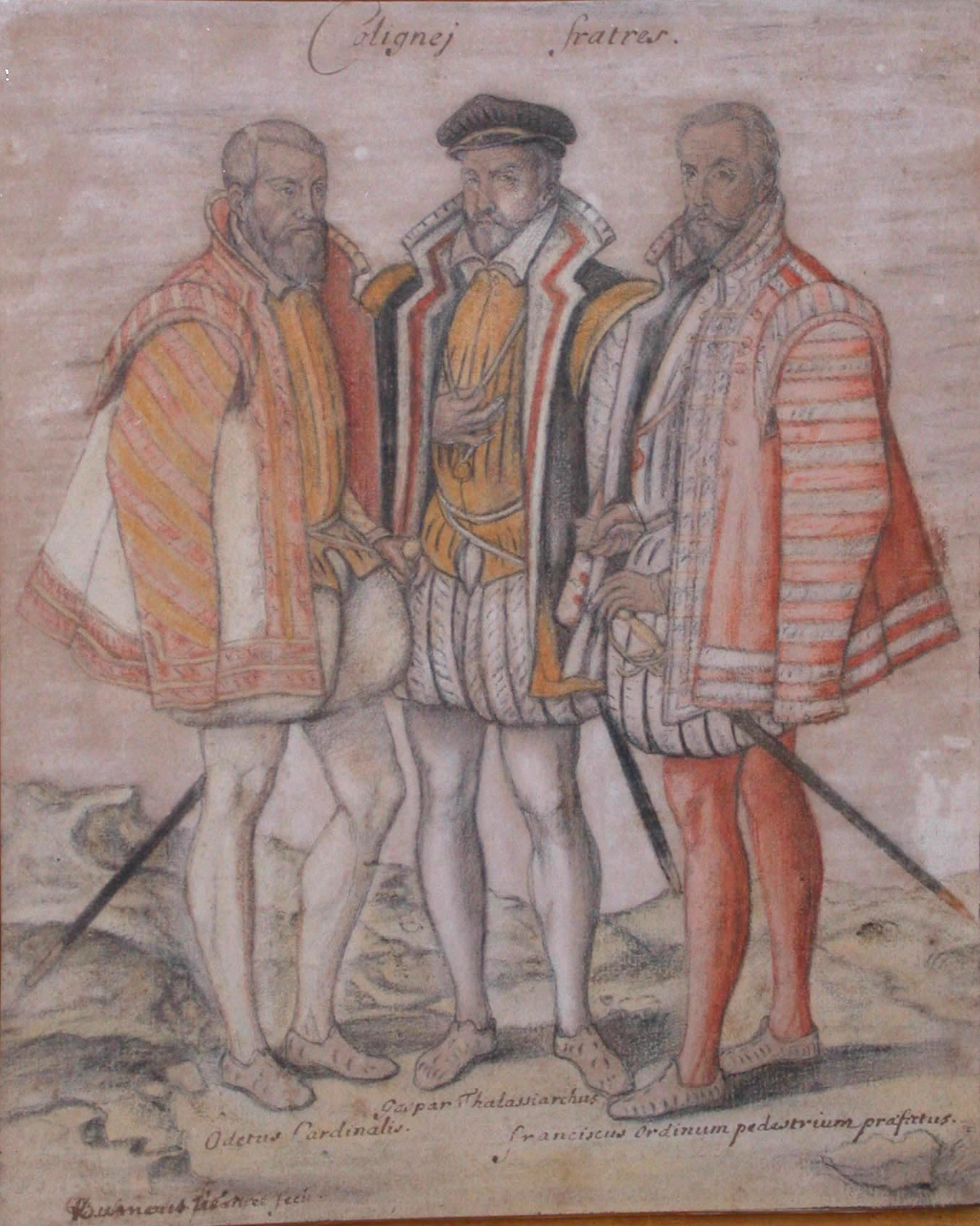
The Coligny Brothers (Chatillon): Gaspard II, Odet, Cardinal de Chatillon and François, Senor d'Andelo. Musée Condé, Chantilly.

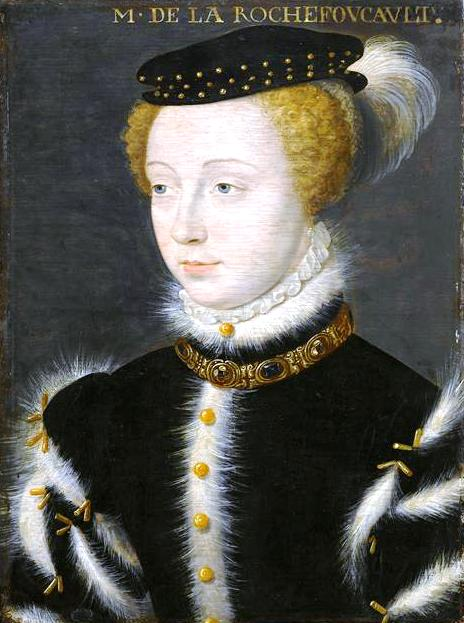
Comtesse Charlotte La Rochefoucauld. Paris, Louvre, c. 1555.

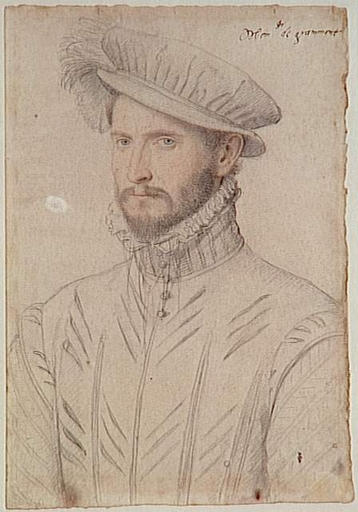
Antoine I d'Or, Comte de Gramont. Musée Condé, Chantilly, c. 1559.

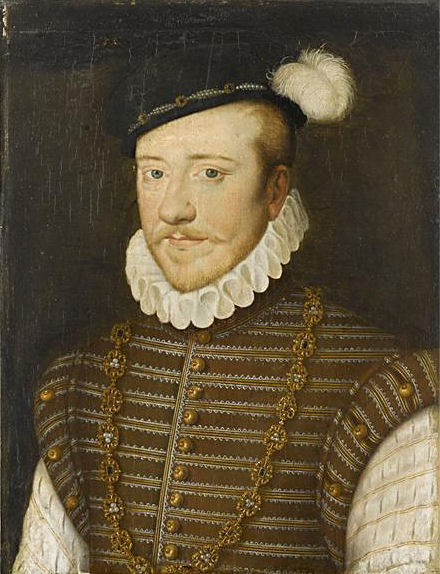
Jacques of Savoy, Duke of Nemours. Musée Condé, Chantilly.
