= High Sheriff Award =

Award in United Kingdom

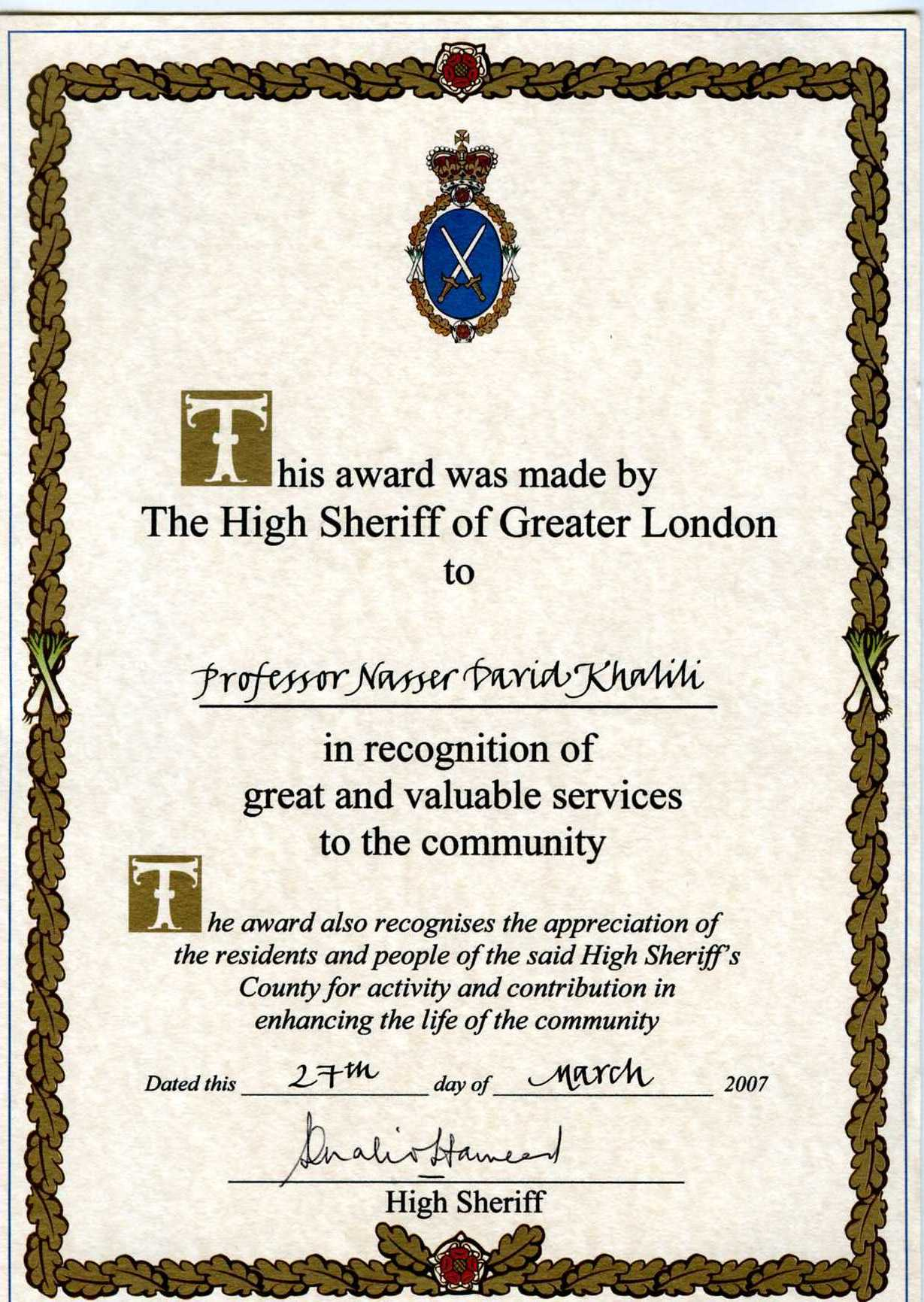
- High Sheriff Award certificate presented to Nasser Khalili by the High Sheriff of Greater London
- Awarded for: Service to the community; Ensuring justice; Aiding the victims of crime
- Country: England and Wales, Northern Ireland
- Presented by: High Sheriff

In England and Wales and Northern Ireland, a High Sheriff Award or High Sheriff's Award is an honour granted by a High Sheriff to an individual or organisation to recognise work they have done for the local community in the sheriff's county.

Additionally, circuit judges and recorders and judges in crown courts have delegated authority, under section 28 of the Criminal Law Act 1826, to grant the award to someone who has acted to bring someone to justice, including but not limited to a victim of a crime, or who has provided assistance to the victims of crime. These awards include a monetary reward, paid out of court funds.

The number of awards given, nomination deadlines, the frequency of award ceremonies, and the eligibility criteria for nominators and awardees vary between High Sheriffs. Some also include a category for youth awards. Nominations for non-judicial awards are usually made directly to the relevant High Sheriff.
