= Lord Vallance =

Lord Vallance may refer to:

- Patrick Vallance, Baron Vallance of Balham (born 1960), British physician, scientist and Labour politician
- Iain Vallance, Baron Vallance of Tummel (born 1943), British businessman and Liberal Democrat politician
