= Mark Baring =

Mark Baring may refer to:

- Mark Baring, 8th Baron Ashburton (born 1958), British businessman
- Sir Mark Baring (hospital administrator) (1916–1988), British hospital administrator, financial services executive and public servant
