= Nasser Khalili =

British collector and property developer

Sir Nasser David Khalili KCSS
- ناصر داوود خلیلی
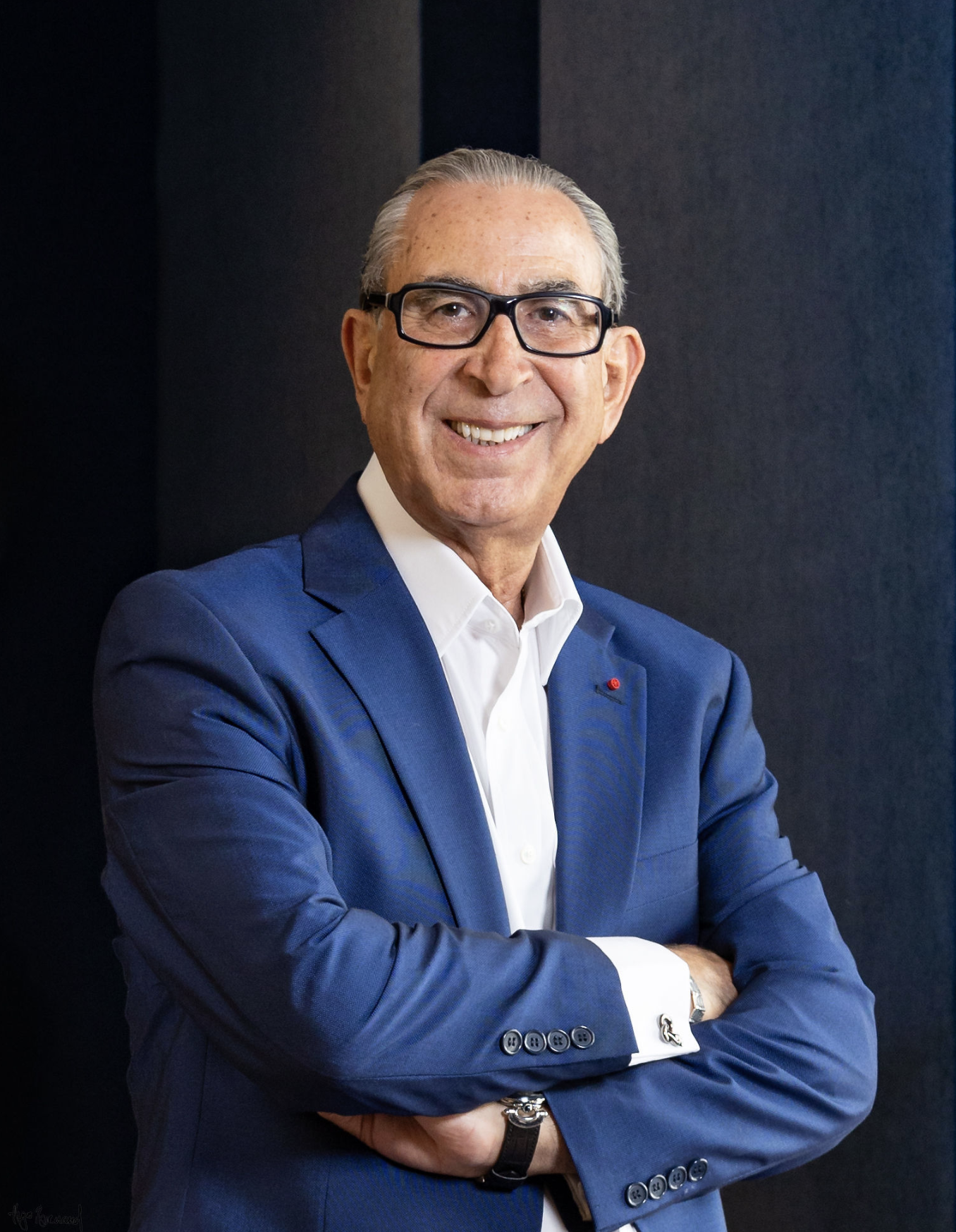
- 2023
- Born: 18 December 1945 (age 80); Isfahan, Iran
- Education: Queens College, City University of New York; School of Oriental and African Studies
- Occupations: Scholar; Art collector Philanthropist
- Spouse: Marion Easton
- Children: 3
- Website: www.nasserdkhalili.com

Sir Nasser David Khalili KCSS (Persian: ناصر داوود خلیلی, born 18 December 1945) is a Persian-Born British scholar, collector, and philanthropist based in London. Born in Iran and educated at Queens College, City University of New York and the School of Oriental and African Studies in London, he is a naturalised British citizen.

He assembled eight art collections—the Khalili Collections—each considered among the most important in its field. These collections total 35,000 artworks and include the largest private collection of Islamic art and a collection of Japanese art rivalling that of the Japanese imperial family. He has spent tens of millions of pounds on conserving, researching, and documenting the collections, publishing more than seventy volumes of catalogues and research so far. Exhibitions drawn from the collections have appeared in institutions around the world.

Khalili first started collecting artwork in New York City during the 1970s, later investing in property in the United Kingdom during the 1980s. Since then his wealth has grown substantially, which he stated in an interview was due to "dealing in art, commodities and real estate". Khalili is known for the purchase and renovation of a number of large properties in London and Glasgow.

Through his philanthropic organisation, the Khalili Foundation, he supports a range of activities to promote mutual understanding and dialogue between Abrahamic religions. His donations funded the creation of a research centre in Islamic art at the University of Oxford as well as the first university chair in the subject, at the School of Oriental and African Studies. He also supports the creation and distribution of educational materials and has written and distributed a history of Islamic art and architecture.

Khalili is a UNESCO Goodwill Ambassador and has taken part in United Nations and UNESCO events on the theme of peace between cultures. His work for intercultural dialogue and peace has been recognised with honorary degrees from five universities and awards from the French National Assembly and a High Sheriff Award from the High Sheriff of Greater London. He is the recipient of the Legion of Honour, presented by French President François Hollande. He is also a trustee of the City of Jerusalem and has received knighthoods from two Popes. He received a knighthood in the 2020 Queen's Birthday Honours "for services to interfaith relations and charity".

When asked about his collections, Khalili stated that he "found things that belonged to a great heritage that was just sitting there unnoticed. [...] They were displaced from history and deserved to be preserved and recognised".

== Early life and education ==
Khalili was born in 1945 in the city of Isfahan, Iran, the fourth of five children, to a Jewish family of art dealers and traders of artefacts. The family moved to Tehran when Khalili was a few months old. By the age of eight, he was accompanying his father on buying trips, acquiring Persian lacquers and other Islamic artworks. He studied in Tehran and, at age 14, wrote a book profiling more than two hundred geniuses. The book was prompted by an argument with one of his teachers. After the book's publication, Khalili featured on television discussing his book and also wrote columns in newspapers.

Khalili completed his national service in Iran as a medic in the Iranian Army, before leaving Iran in 1967 for the United States with US$750, the proceeds from his book. He studied computer science and earned a bachelor's degree in the subject at Queens College, City University of New York, graduating in 1974. He later received a PhD degree in Islamic art in 1988 from the School of Oriental and African Studies, London, with a thesis on Islamic lacquerware.

== Business and collecting career ==
Khalili started his business career trading in art before moving into property development and commodities. He began collecting art in New York City in the 1970s, keeping the best pieces for his own collection. In the mid-1970s he moved to London and began to frequent its auction houses, establishing his own gallery in Mayfair between 1978 and 1980. Khalili initially traded in Persian lacquerware, later writing his doctoral thesis on the subject. In 1978, the price of Islamic art fell substantially. The Iranian Revolution brought more items onto the market as rich families sold their art and during the subsequent Iran–Iraq War there was little interest in collecting art in that region. Khalili took the opportunity to expand his collection, acquiring works that would be valued much more highly with the later growth of international interest in Islamic art.

People close to Khalili stated that he invested wisely and often discreetly, buying items that later appreciated to one hundred times the price he paid. Khalili's dealership was based in Mayfair's Clifford Street in the 1980s. When asked directly how he had gathered his wealth during the 1970s and 1980s, Khalili stated it was from sugar and coffee trading, the options market, property investments and works of art.

In a 2010 interview, Khalili said that his collecting in the mid-1980s was funded by his dealings in venture capital, having profited from shares in a company that developed technology to treat tumours, and that he made $15 million from the sale of a company that manufactured indigestion pills in 1987. In 1992, he described his wealth as deriving from "dealing in art, commodities and real estate".

In the mid-1980s, the scale of Khalili's collection greatly expanded. He sought out the rarest items and paid record prices at auction. In the early 1990s, he began to publish a catalogue of his Islamic art collection, commissioning numerous scholars of Islam. Suspicions in the art industry were that Khalili was assembling the collection on behalf of a rich investor. Eventually, he revealed that he was collecting on behalf of his own family trust. During the same period, Khalili was an art advisor to Hassanal Bolkiah, the Sultan of Brunei. He wrote a catalogue of the Sultan's artworks that were on display in the Brunei Museum.

In 1992, Khalili offered to lend his Islamic art collection to the British government for a period of 15 years and on condition it would be publicly displayed in a "museum building in central London". He suggested that the museum would be known as the Nasser D. Khalili Museum, with the running costs of the museum and insurance to be publicly funded. The offer was made with the potential for turning the donation into a gift at the expiration of the 15-year period. The Conservative politician Lord Young of Graffham and the public relations executive Lord Bell lobbied the government to accept Khalili's offer. Many expressed an interest in the proposal, including Prince Charles.

In 2007, Khalili's wealth was estimated at £5.8 billion by the Sunday Times Rich List, but he did not appear in subsequent editions of the list. Forbes listed him as a billionaire from 2005 onwards, estimating his wealth at $1.3 billion in 2007 and 2008, until dropping him from the list in 2014.

In 2008, The Art Newspaper wrote that "a £1 billion valuation is believed more likely" than previously claimed higher amounts. Khalili has claimed to have spent $650 million on art.

== Art collections ==
Khalili has assembled eight art collections, collectively known as the Khalili Collections. They include Islamic art dating from 700 to 2000; Hajj and the Arts of Pilgrimage from 700 to 2000; Aramaic Documents from 353 BC to 324 BC; Japanese Art of the Meiji Period from 1868 to 1912; Japanese Kimono from 1700 to 2000; Swedish Textiles from 1700 to 1900; Spanish Damascened Metalwork from 1850 to 1900 and Enamels of the World from 1700 to 2000. Together, the eight collections contain 35,000 works.

=== Image gallery ===
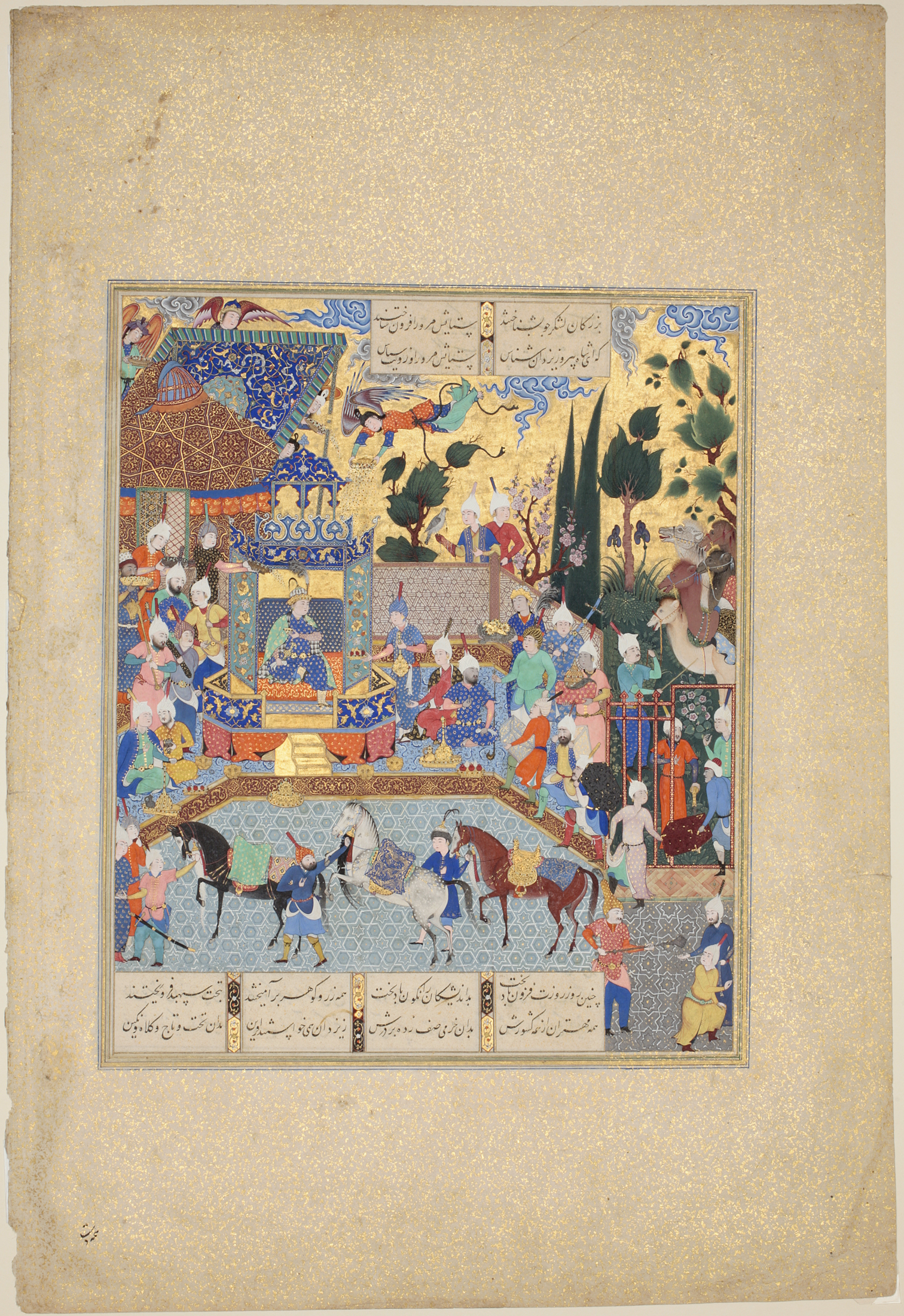
Folio from the exemplar of Ferdowsi's Shahnameh made for Shah Tahmasp I; Tabriz, Iran, 1520–1550, now in the Khalili Collection of Islamic Art

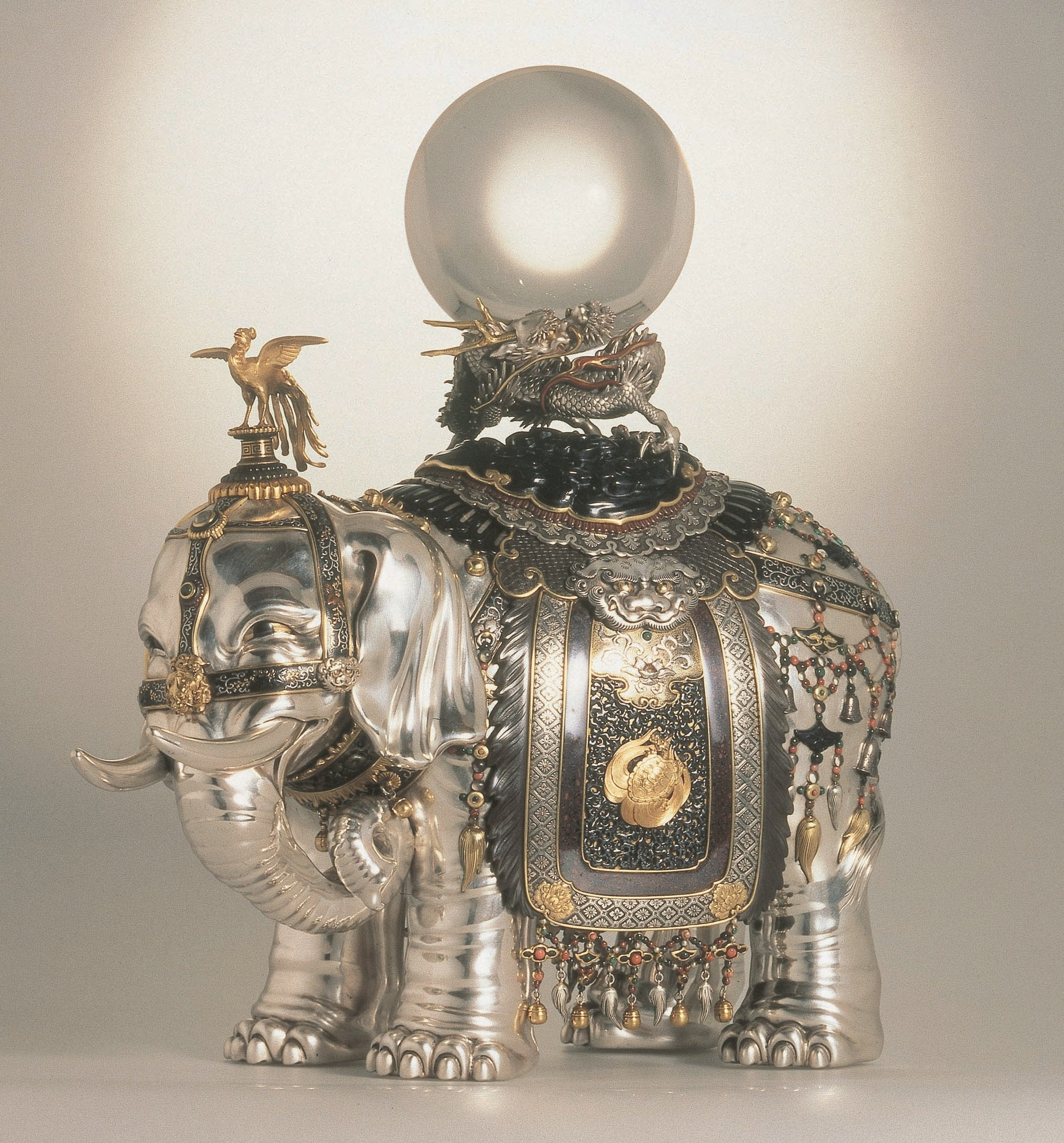
Incense Burner (Koro), Japan, 1890 from the Khalili Collection of Japanese Art

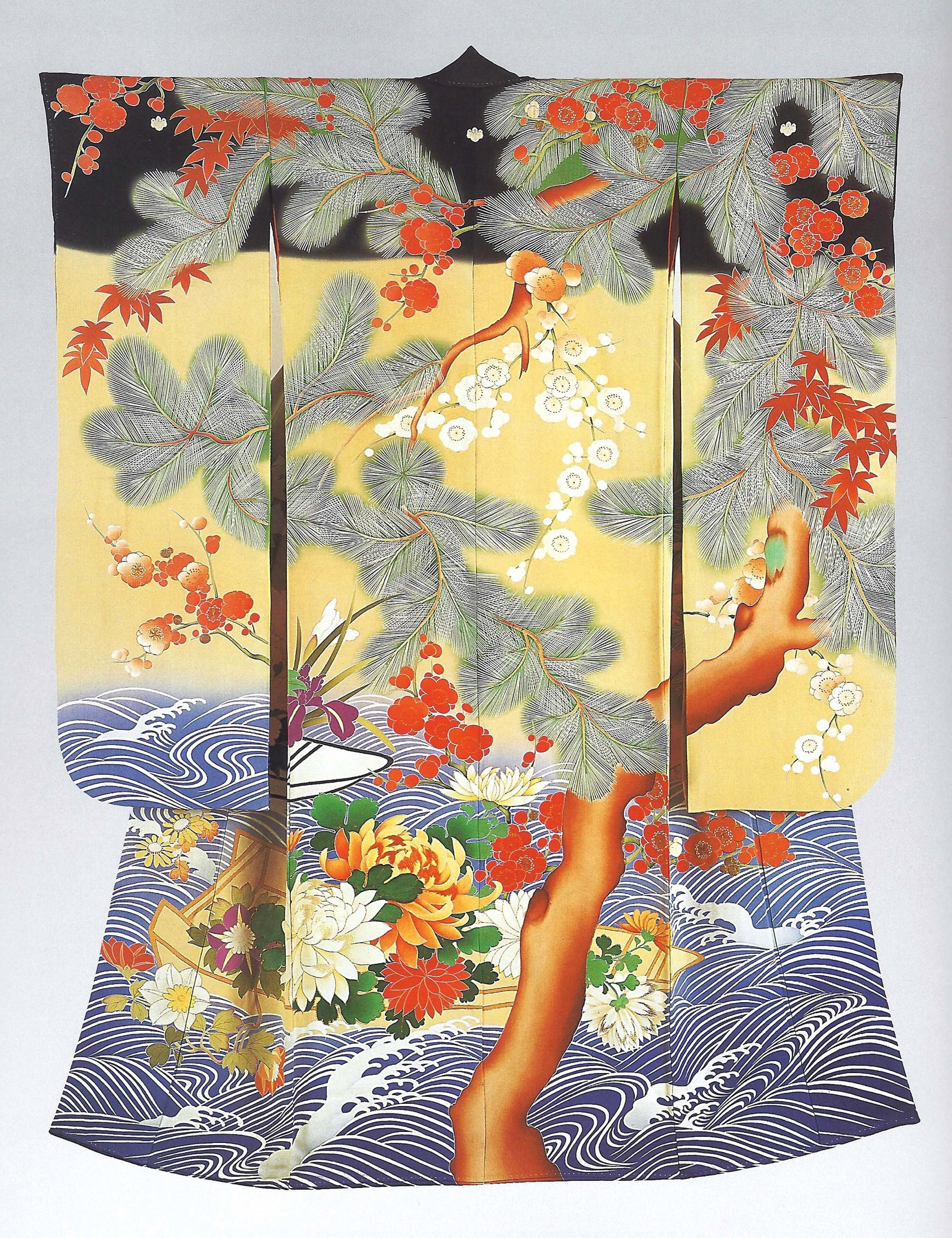
Kimono for a Young Woman (Furisode), Japan, 1912–1926. From the collection of Kimono

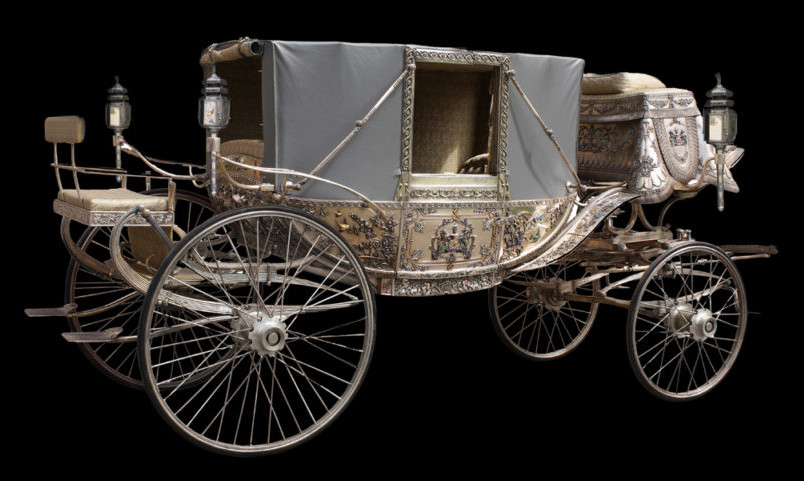
Enamelled carriage owned by Bhavsinhji II, Maharaja of Bhavnagar, now in the Khalili Collection of Enamels of the World

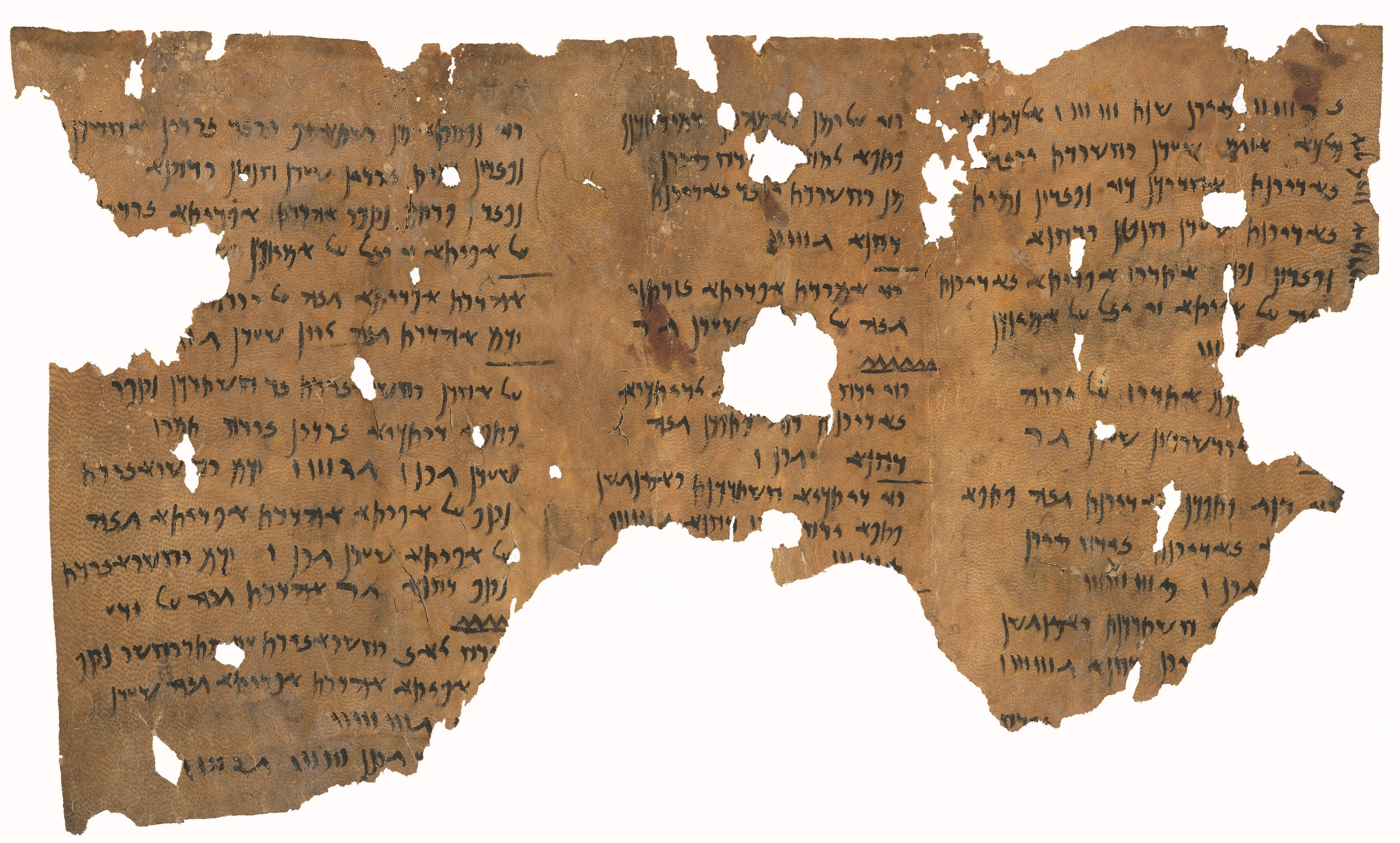
A Long List of Supplies Disbursed, 324BC, from the collection of Aramaic documents

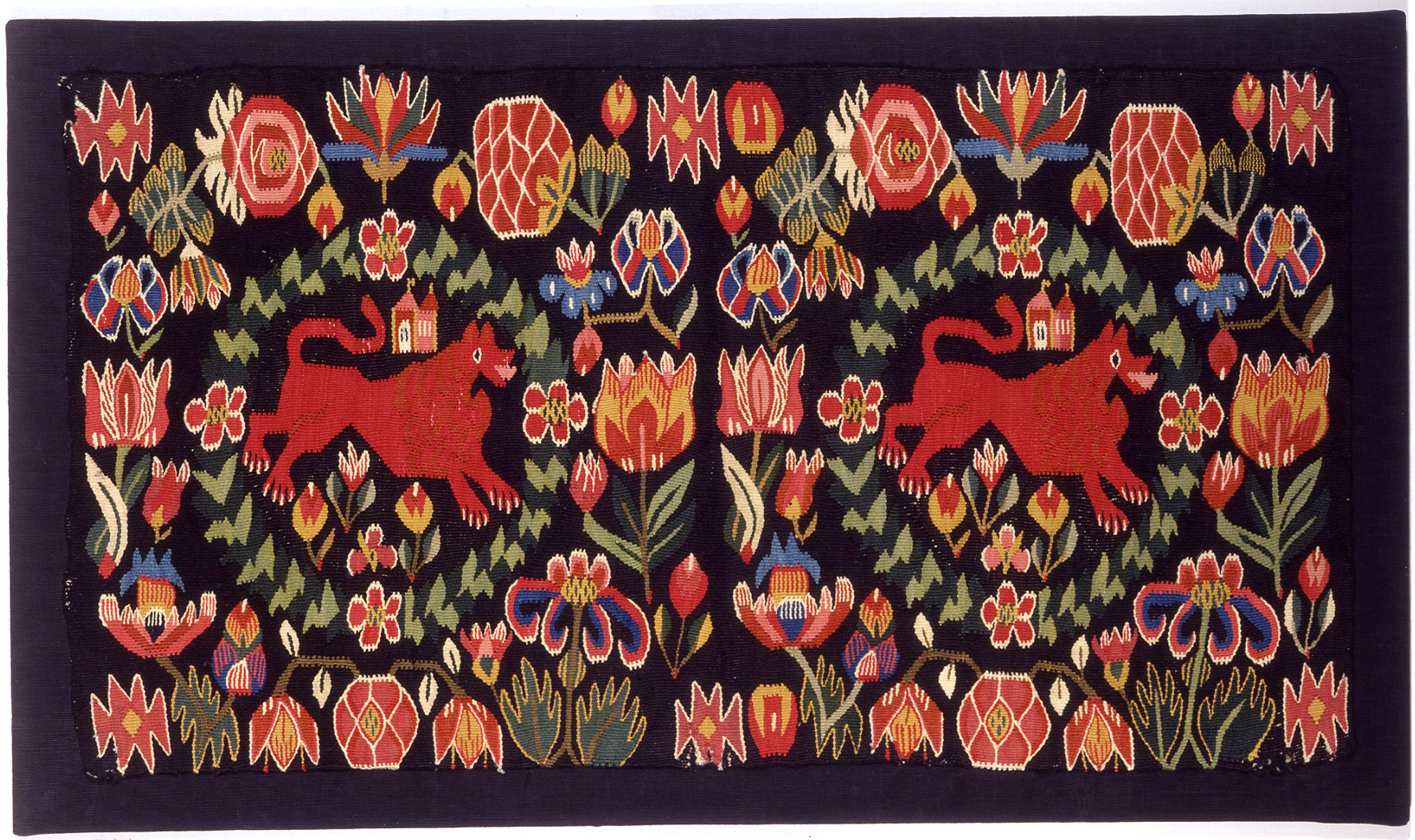
Carriage Cushion Cover (Two Lions in Floral Roundels), late 18th century, from the collection of Swedish textiles

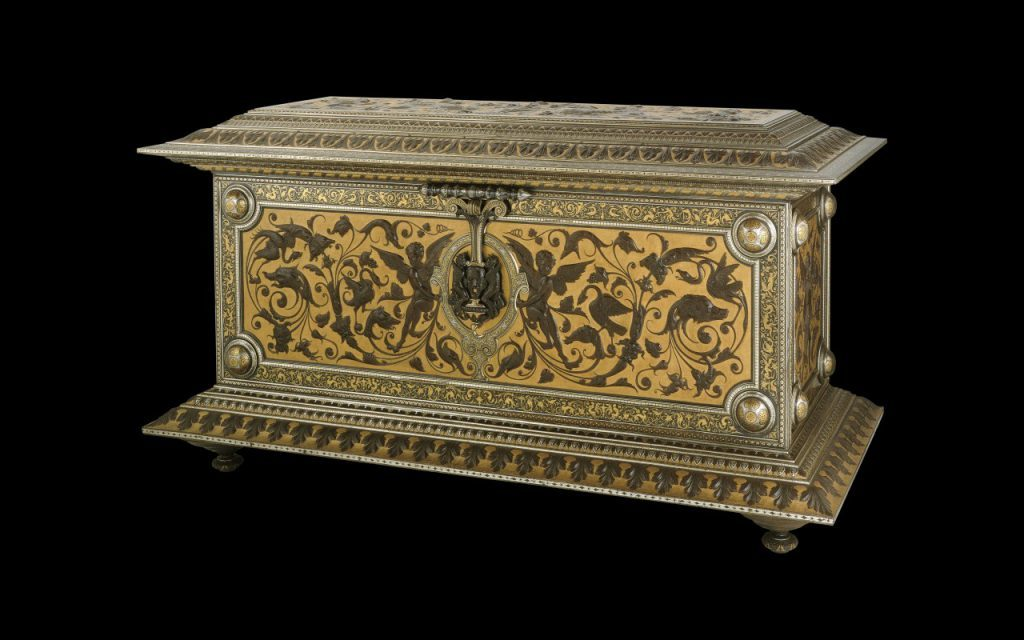
Iron Cassone, Eibar, 1871 from the collection of Spanish damascened metalwork

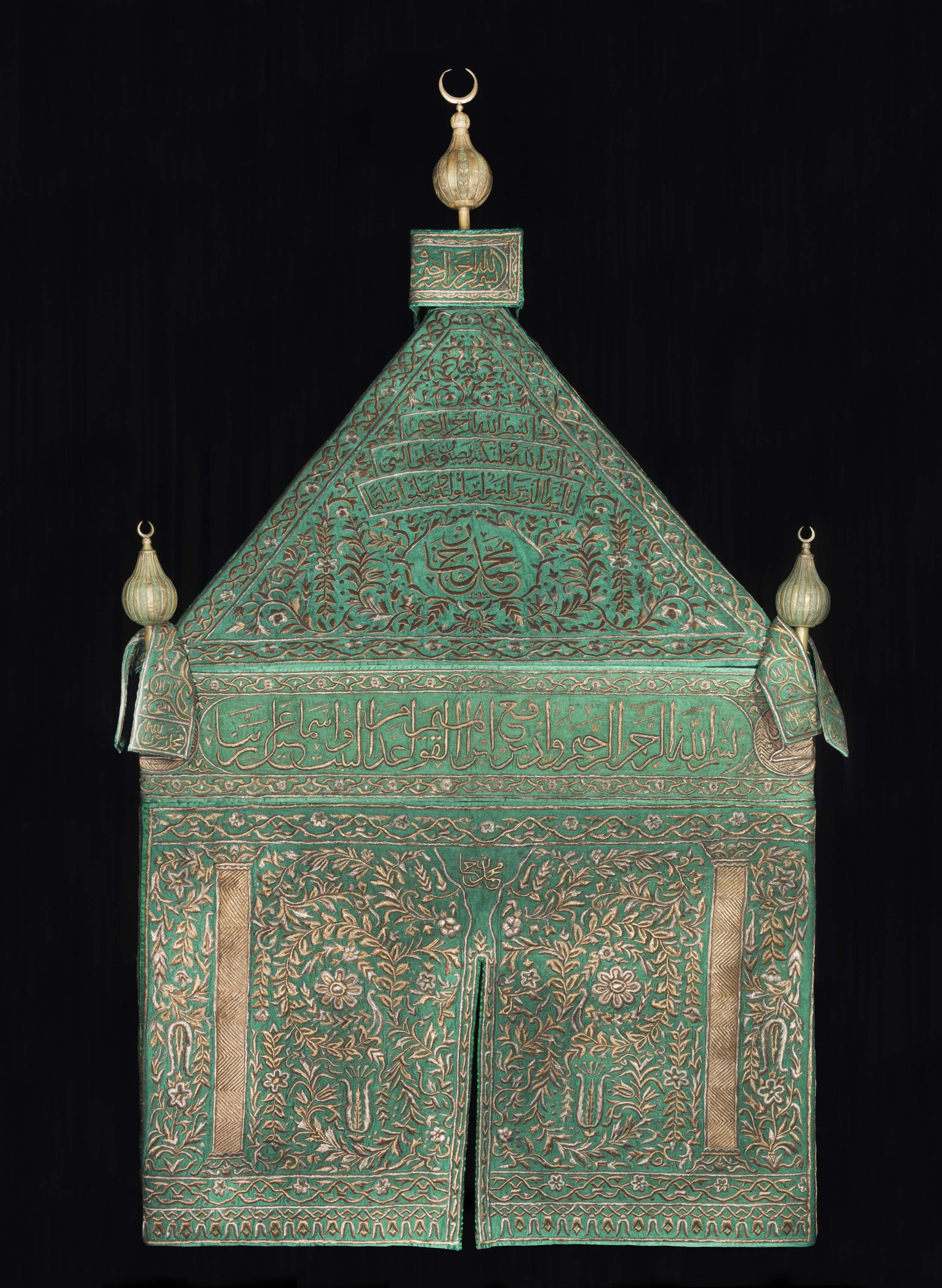
A complete cover for a Damascus mahmal, Istanbul 16th century, from the collection of Hajj and the arts of Pilgrimage

== Property development ==
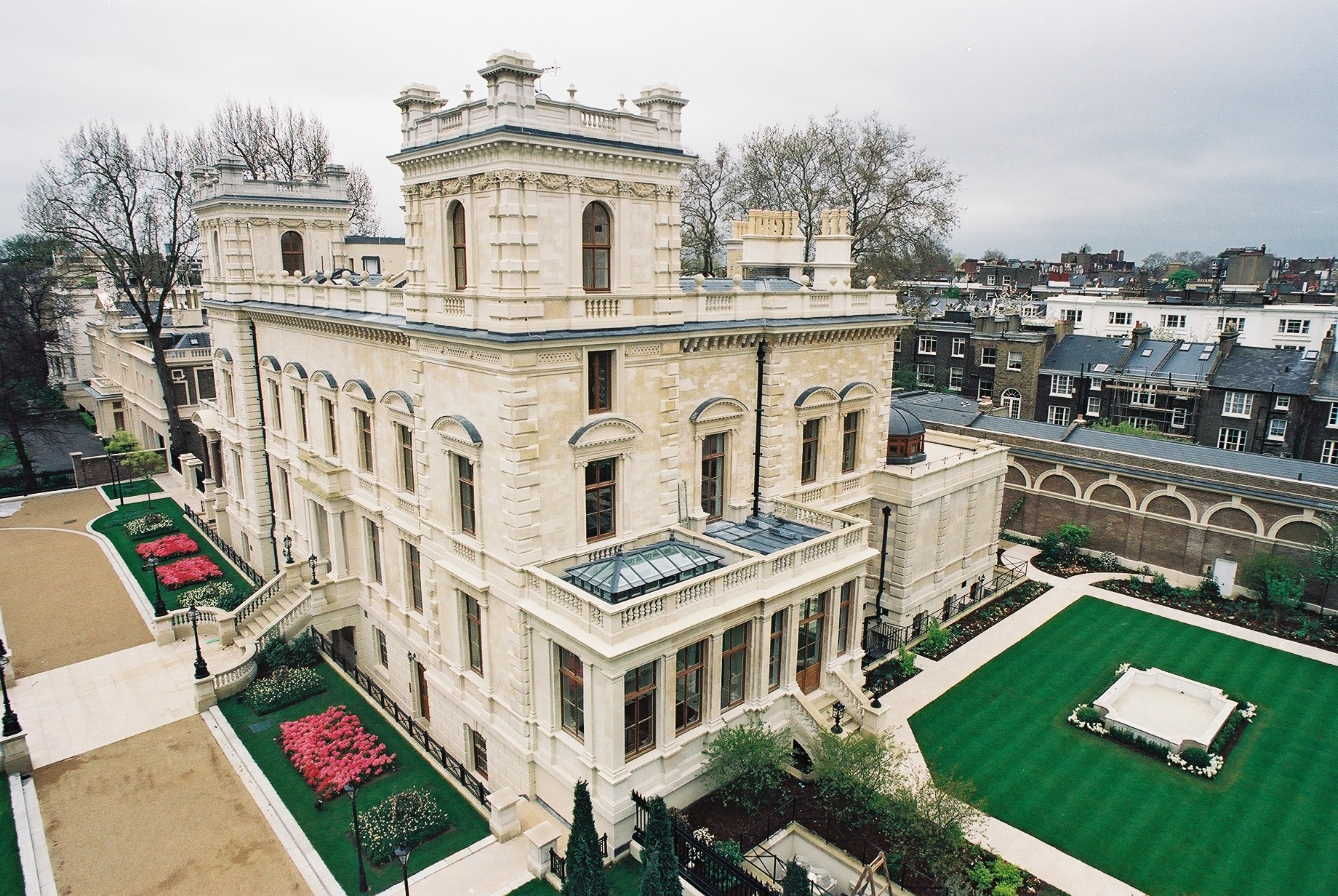
18–19 Kensington Palace Gardens

=== 18–19 Kensington Palace Gardens ===
In 1995, Khalili bought 18 and 19 Kensington Palace Gardens for £40 million. Number 19 had been the Egyptian embassy and 18 was formerly part of the Russian embassy. Khalili's purchase of the property and its subsequent refurbishment cost £84 million.

The refurbishment, involving 400 craftsmen, was believed to have been second in scale only to the restoration of Windsor Castle after the 1992 fire. Marble for pillars was imported from the same Indian quarry that had been used to build the Taj Mahal. The building was bought by businessman Bernie Ecclestone in 2001 for £50 million, making it the most expensive private home in the country. Ecclestone later sold it to industrialist Lakshmi Mittal.

=== Sixty London ===
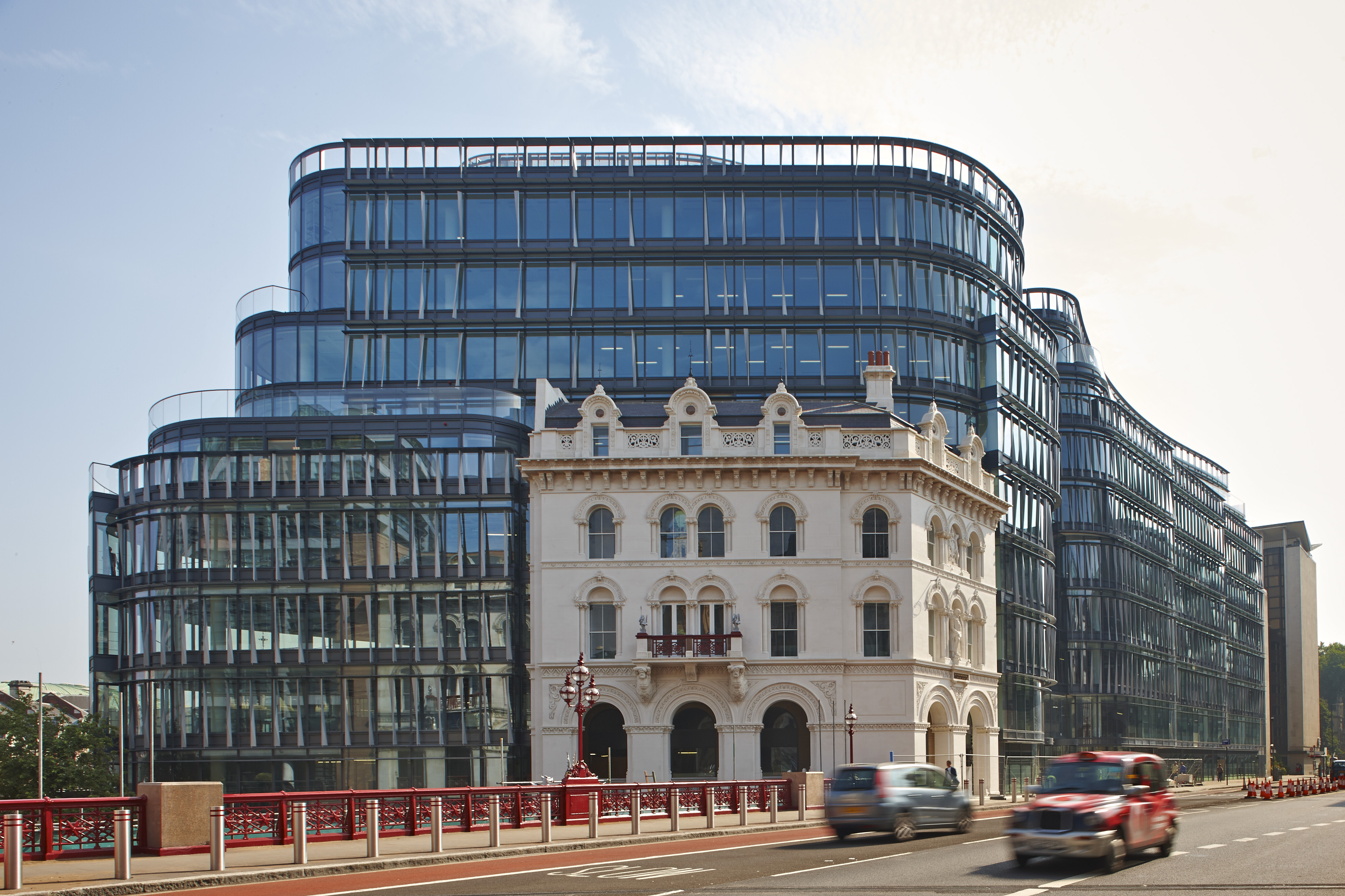
60 Holborn Viaduct

In 1997, Khalili bought Bath House, an office building on Holborn Viaduct for £7 million. In 2007 planning permission was granted for an 11-storey office building called The Wave. The building, completed in 2013, was designed by the architects Kohn Pederson Fox Associates. Since 2010 the project had been a partnership between Khalili's property company Favermead and AXA Real Estate Investment Managers. The new 210,000 square feet (20,000 m^{2}) building was later leased by Amazon in 2013. In 2014 the building became one of the 13 winners in the Urban Land Institute's Global Awards for Excellence, citing the blending of modern and historic architectural elements.

== Philanthropy ==
Khalili has made many substantial donations to a number of organisations, institutions, and charities. His philanthropic activities are presently delivered through the Khalili Foundation. Donations in the field of education include a 2004 endowment of £2.25 million to the University of Oxford. The funds were used for the establishment of the Khalili Research Centre for the Art and Material Culture of the Middle East, which was opened by the Chancellor of Oxford University, Lord Patten, in July 2005. Khalili has since continued to support the centre.

In 1989, Khalili donated £600,000 to establish the Khalili Chair of Islamic Art and Archaeology at the School of Oriental and African Studies, University of London. This was the first university chair devoted to Islamic art. He also gave a further £200,000 in 2003 for the refurbishment of the lecture theatre at the school.

In 1992, he endowed a Research Fellowship in Islamic Art at Oxford University. In 2011, he gave an endowment to Queens College, New York, where he earned his undergraduate degree, to create the Nasser D. Khalili Chair of Islamic Studies.

In the early 1990s, when an advisor to the Sultan of Brunei, he persuaded the Sultan to provide £10 million to build the Brunei Gallery at the School of Oriental and African Studies.

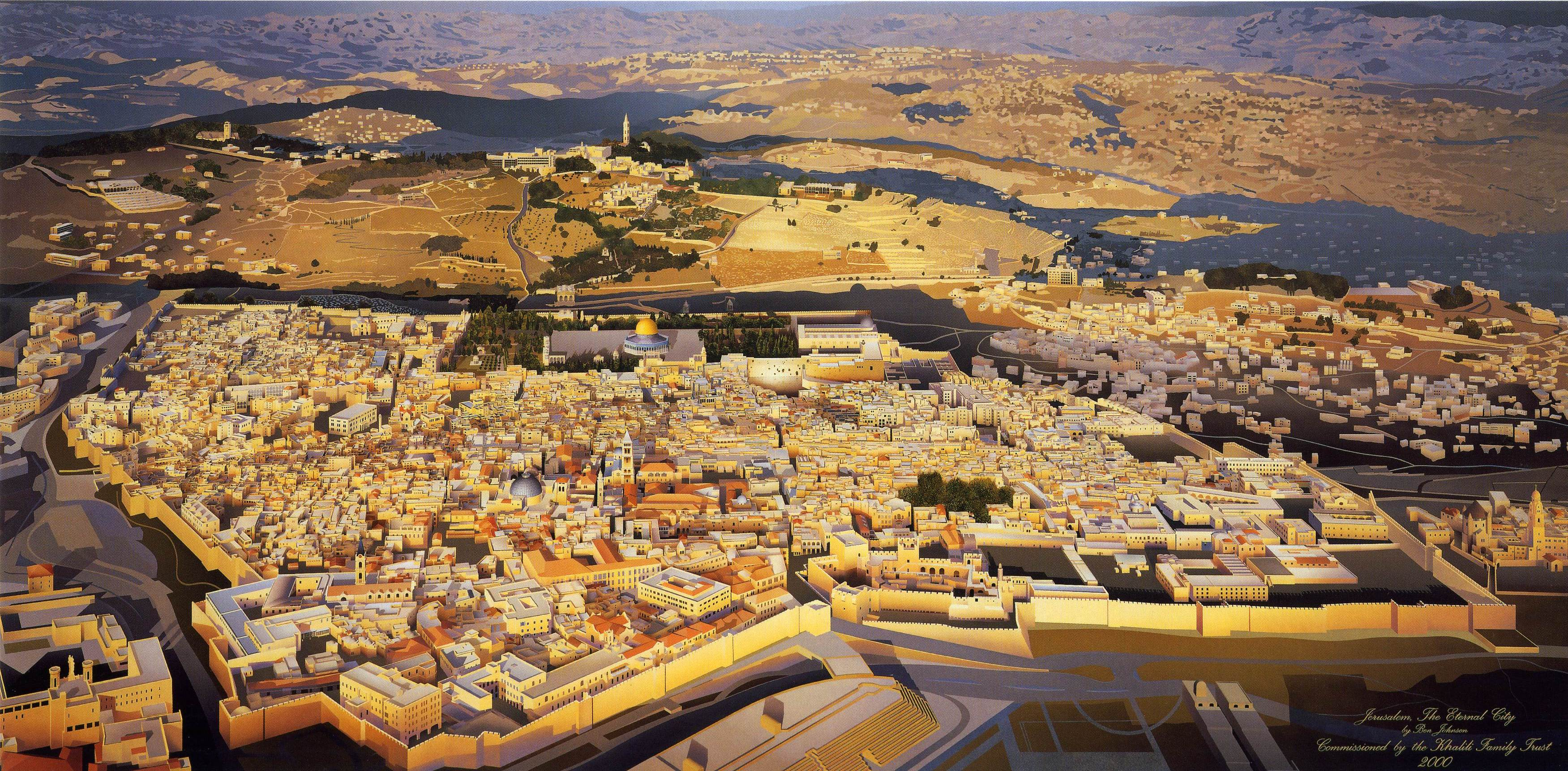
A panorama of Jerusalem from the House of Peace series

One project of Khalili's Foundation is the Maimonidies Interfaith Initiative, originally founded in 1995 to promote "understanding, cooperation and peace between Jews, Christians and Muslims internationally through art, culture and education". Its activities include Interfaith Explorers, a UNESCO-supported online educational resource for children aged 10 to 11. The course is freely offered to schools and supported by a bank of four hundred online videos.

In the 1990s, Khalili commissioned a series of five paintings by the artist Ben Johnson called the House of Peace to promote peace and harmony between Judaism, Christianity and Islam. The foundation also donated 20,000 copies of The Timeline History of Islamic Art and Architecture (Visions of Splendour), written by Khalili, to schools in the United Kingdom and Islamic countries.

Faith in the Commonwealth is a global citizenship education project started jointly by the Commonwealth and the Khalili Foundation. It gives Training of Trainers workshops to people from the ages of 15 to 29 from different faith backgrounds, including those of no faith, supporting them in developing social action projects within their communities. These projects address topics such as hate speech, girls' education, and indigenous people's rights.

Khalili is the chair of Global Hope Europe, one of three not-for-profit organisations that together form the Global Hope Coalition. The coalition was founded in 2016 and gives annual awards to political leaders and "everyday heroes" who combat extremism and intolerance. Irina Bokova, former Director of UNESCO, is the coalition's honorary president.

== Bibliography ==
Khalili is the author of The Timeline History of Islamic Art and Architecture, first published by Worth Press in 2005. It has been published in six editions, including in English, Arabic, French and Dutch. He is the co-author, with Nahla Nassar, of A selection of Islamic Art at the Brunei Museum (published 1990) and co-author, with Basil William Robinson and Tim Stanley, of the two-volume Lacquer of the Islamic Lands (published 1996 and 1997). He has also overseen the publication of dozens of volumes relating to his collections, including catalogues and scholarly essays. An autobiography, The Art of Peace, was published by Penguin Books on 2 November 2023.

== Recognition ==
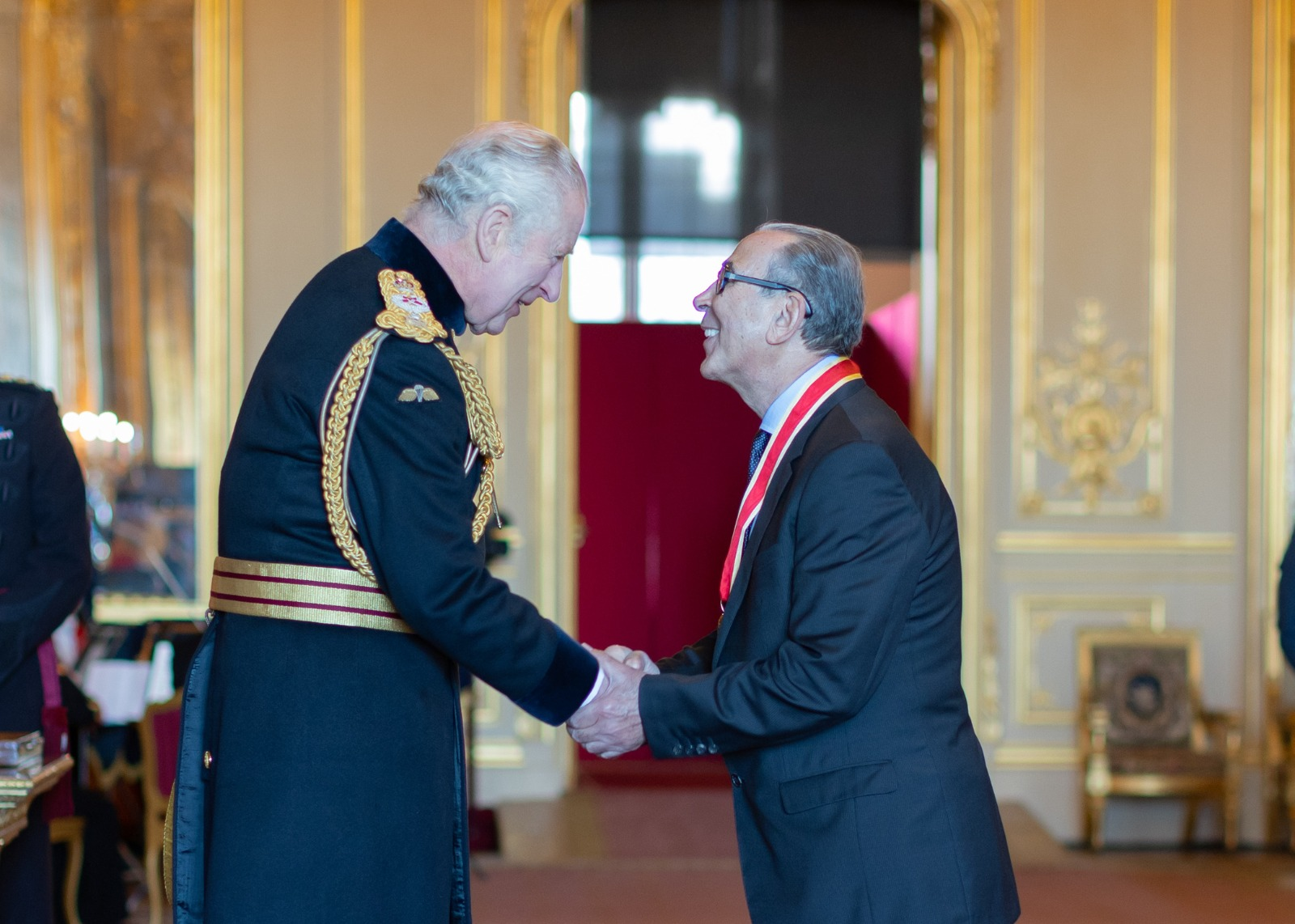
The investiture of Sir David Khalili, presided by King Charles III at Windsor Castle, 16 November 2022

He has been awarded many honours, including being the only non-Christian to have received knighthoods from two Popes. Pope John Paul II awarded him Knight of the Pontifical Equestrian Order of St Sylvester (KSS) and Pope Benedict XVI further elevated him to Knight Commander in that order (KCSS) for his pursuit of peace, education and culture among nations. In 2012, he was further honoured in this field by UNESCO who appointed him a Goodwill Ambassador. In early 2016 he was awarded the rank of Officier in the Legion of Honour by President François Hollande in a ceremony at the Élysée Palace.

He was knighted in the 2020 Birthday Honours for services to inter-faith relations and charity.

=== Honours and awards ===
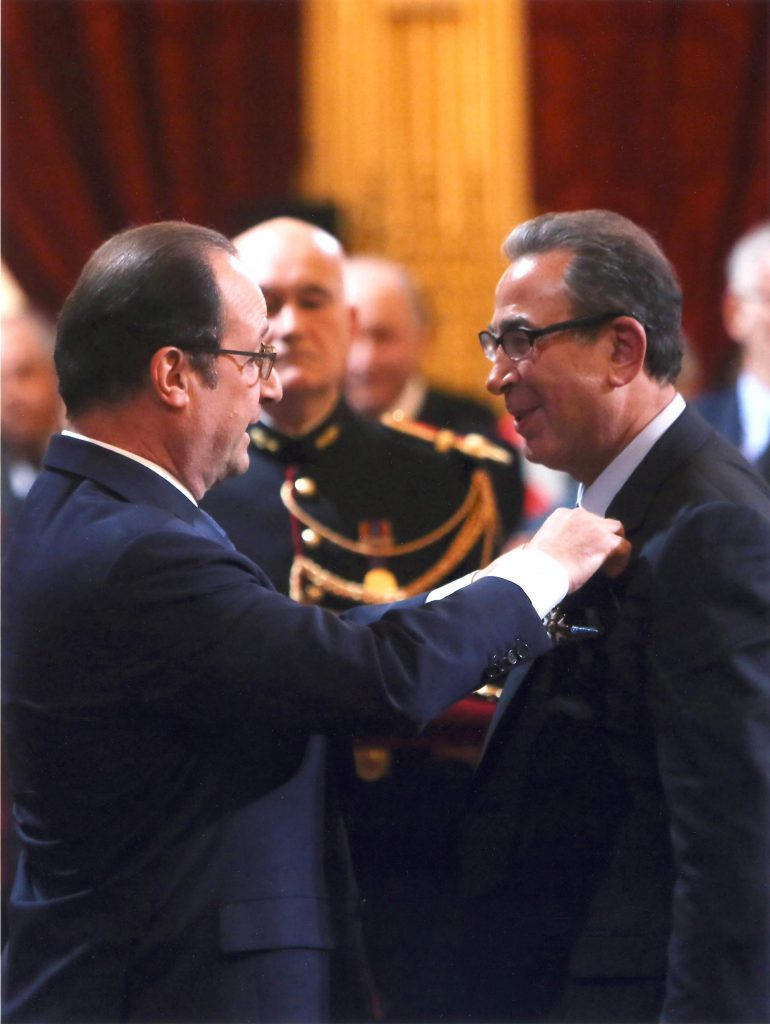
President François Hollande presenting Khalili with the Legion of Honour, April 2016

- Honorary Fellow, School of Oriental and African Studies, University of London (1991)
- Trustee of the City of Jerusalem (1996)
- Knight Commander of the Royal Order of Francis I (KCFO) (2003)
- Honorary Doctor of Humane Letters, Boston University (2003)
- Knight of the Equestrian Order of Pope St Sylvester (KSS) (2004)
- Honorary Doctorate of the University of the Arts, London (2005)
- Honorary Fellow of Wolfson College, Oxford (2005)
- Member of Chancellor's Court of Benefactors, University of Oxford (2006)
- High Sheriff of Greater London Award for cultural contribution to London (2007)
- Knight Commander of the Pontifical Equestrian Order of St. Sylvester (KCSS) (2009)
- Queens College, New York President's Award (2010)
- UNESCO Goodwill Ambassador (2012)
- Queens College, New York President's Medal "in recognition of his service to humanity through art, culture, and philanthropy" (2013)
- Aladdin Award for Dialogue Among Cultures at the French Assembly (2014)
- Honorary Degree, Doctor of Humanities, Honoris Causa, Franklin University, Switzerland (2015)
- Rank of Officier in the Ordre national de la Légion d’Honneur, France (2016)
- Member of the Honorary Board, INTERPOL Foundation for a Safer World (2018-2019)
- Eurasian Legend Award, Eurasia Academy, Baku, Azerbaijan (2019)
- Knight Bachelor "for services to interfaith relations and charity" (2020)
- Freedom of the City of London (2025)

=== UNESCO Goodwill Ambassador ===
In 2012, Khalili was honoured by UNESCO as a Goodwill Ambassador for his work in the pursuit of peace among nations via education and culture. In this role, he has taken part in a number of international events to promote dialogue between cultures and between religions, including a 2013 keynote address to launch UNESCO's International Decade for the Rapprochement of Cultures. He has also spoken at UNESCO events about the role of culture in sustainable development.

== Personal life ==
In 1978, Khalili married Marion Easton, whom he had met when buying jewellery from an antique shop where she was working. They have three sons.

== See also ==
- List of Queens College people
