= Ben Johnson (artist) =

British painter (born 1946)

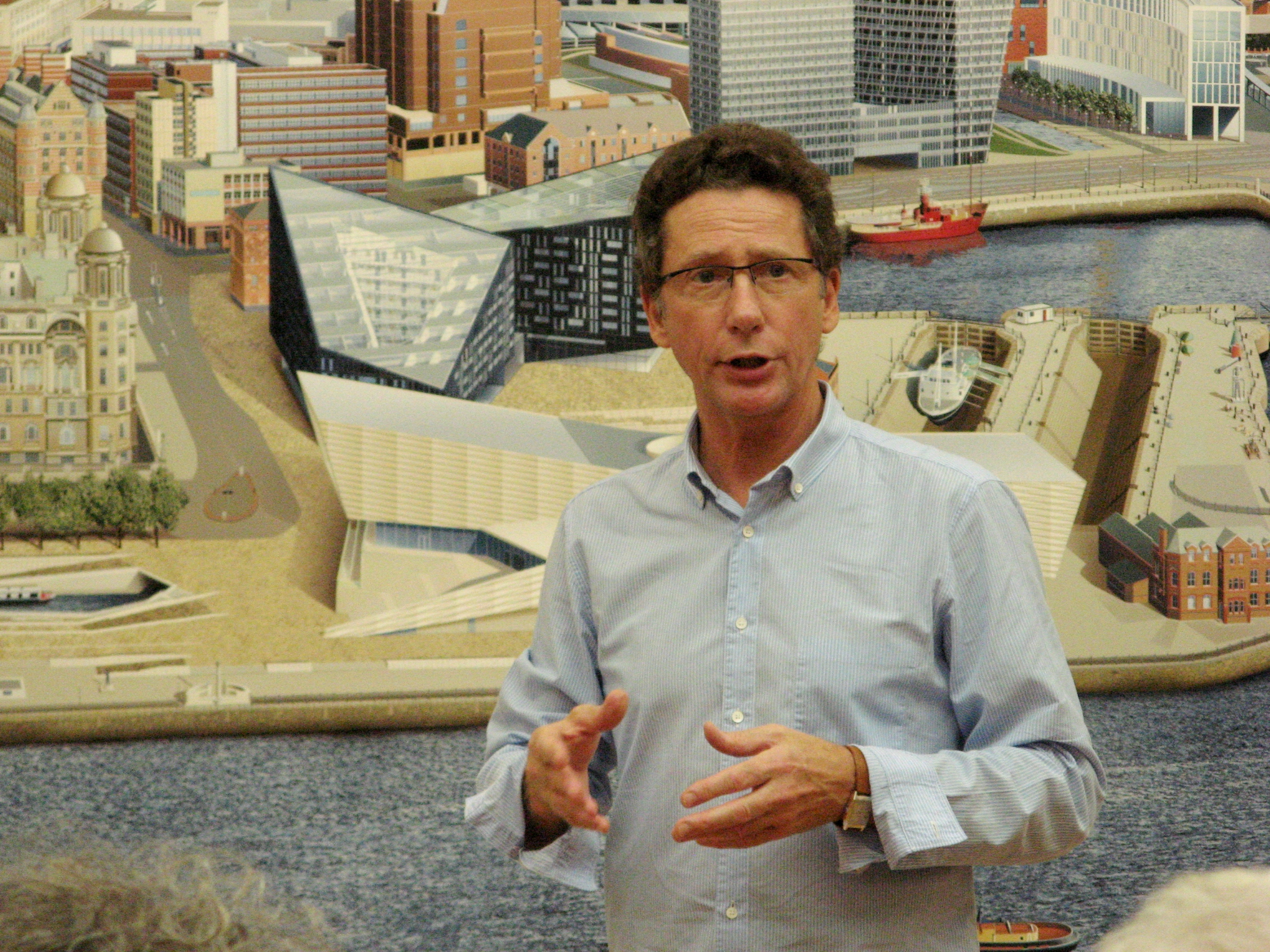
Ben Johnson, in front of his Liverpool Cityscape, at the Walker Art Gallery, Liverpool in 2008

Ben Johnson (born 24 August 1946) is a British painter, known for his series of large, detailed cityscapes.

== Life and work ==
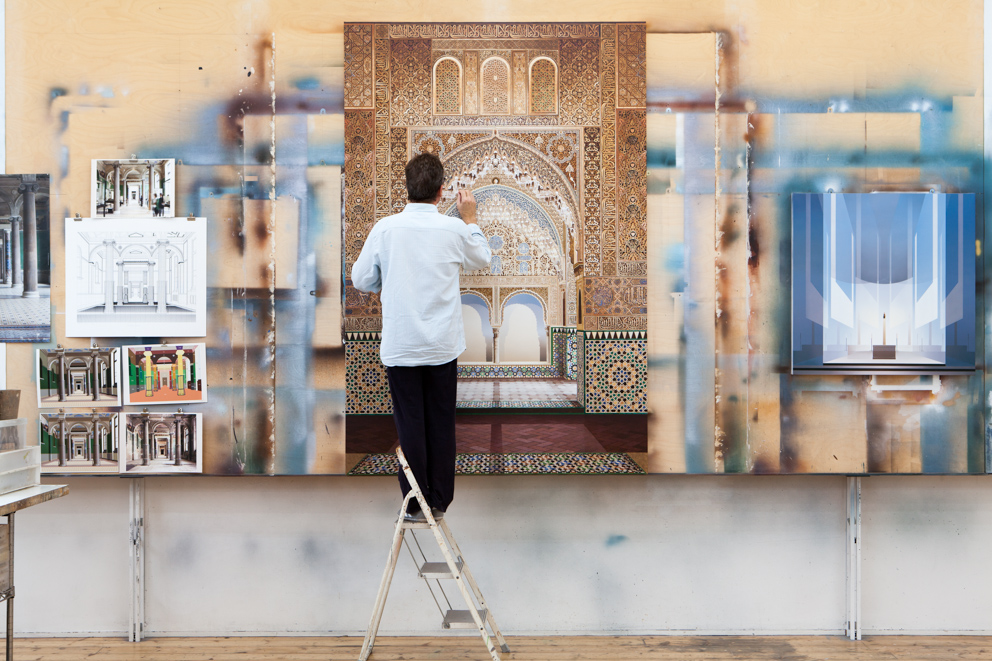
'Approaching the Mirador', Ben Johnson, 2013, Acrylic on Canvas, 225 x 150 cm

Ben Johnson was born in Llandudno, Wales, in 1946. He studied at the Royal College of Art and has lived and worked in London since 1965.

His first solo exhibition was at the Wickesham Gallery, New York, in 1969 immediately after graduating from the Royal College. He is known for his paintings based on architectural spaces and his large-scale, intricately detailed cityscape paintings, which include panoramas of Hong Kong, Zürich, Jerusalem, Liverpool and, most recently, his view of London which was completed as part of a residency at the National Gallery, London, in 2010.

Over the past 46 years he has exhibited in galleries and museums across the world, including the Institute of Contemporary Arts, London; the Walker Art Gallery, Liverpool; the Art Institute of Chicago; Kunsthalle Tübingen; and the Museo Thyssen-Bornemisza, Madrid. At the first Venice Architecture Biennale in 1991, Norman Foster portrayed his work solely through Johnson's images, before Johnson's work was included in Foster's installation at the 2012 biennale. His work is part of a travelling exhibition currently touring museum venues in Europe, and the first retrospective exhibition of his paintings was scheduled to open in September 2015 at the Southampton City Museum and Art Gallery.

He has undertaken commissions for the Royal Institute of British Architects, the British Museum and National Museums Liverpool as well as for IBM, HSBC, JP Morgan, British Steel, Hong Kong Telecommunications among others.

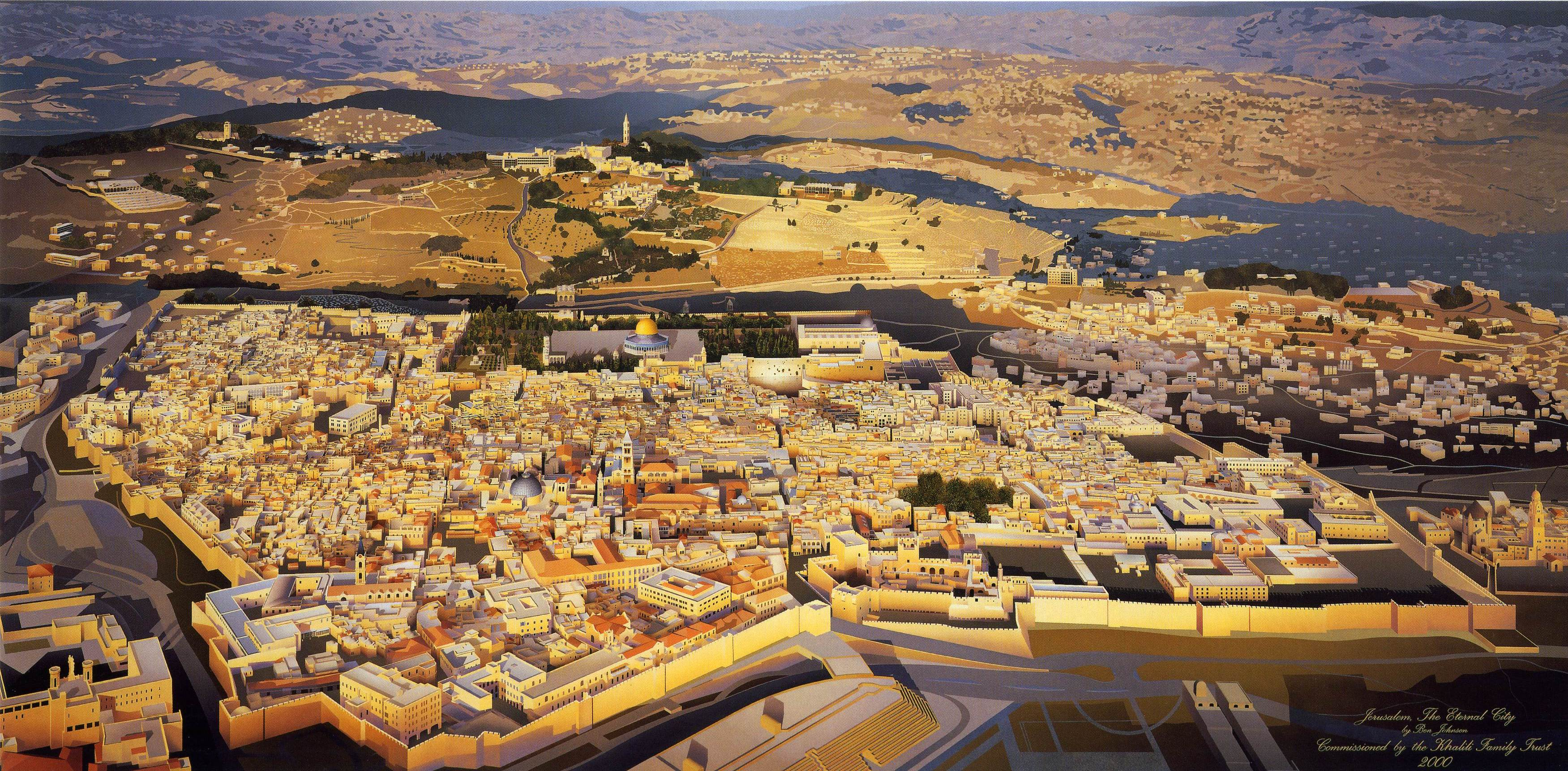
Panorama of Jerusalem (2000), part of the House of Peace series

In 2000, the collector and philanthropist Nasser D. Khalili commissioned a set of five paintings titled "House of Peace", depicting spiritual sites of Jerusalem, intended to promote harmony between Abrahamic religions.

His work is included in the permanent collections of museums worldwide, including the Victoria & Albert Museum, London; the Centre Georges Pompidou, Paris; the Museum of Modern Art, New York; the Regional Services Museum, Hong Kong; and the Government Art Collection.

As of 2014, Johnson has been exploring the ageing and scarring of architecture and, in tandem, investigating geometry and the sacred embodied in Islamic architecture. A second solo exhibition at Alan Cristea Gallery opened in May 2014.

In October 2015, Johnson collected an honorary fellowship from Wrexham’s Glyndŵr University.

== The Liverpool Cityscape ==
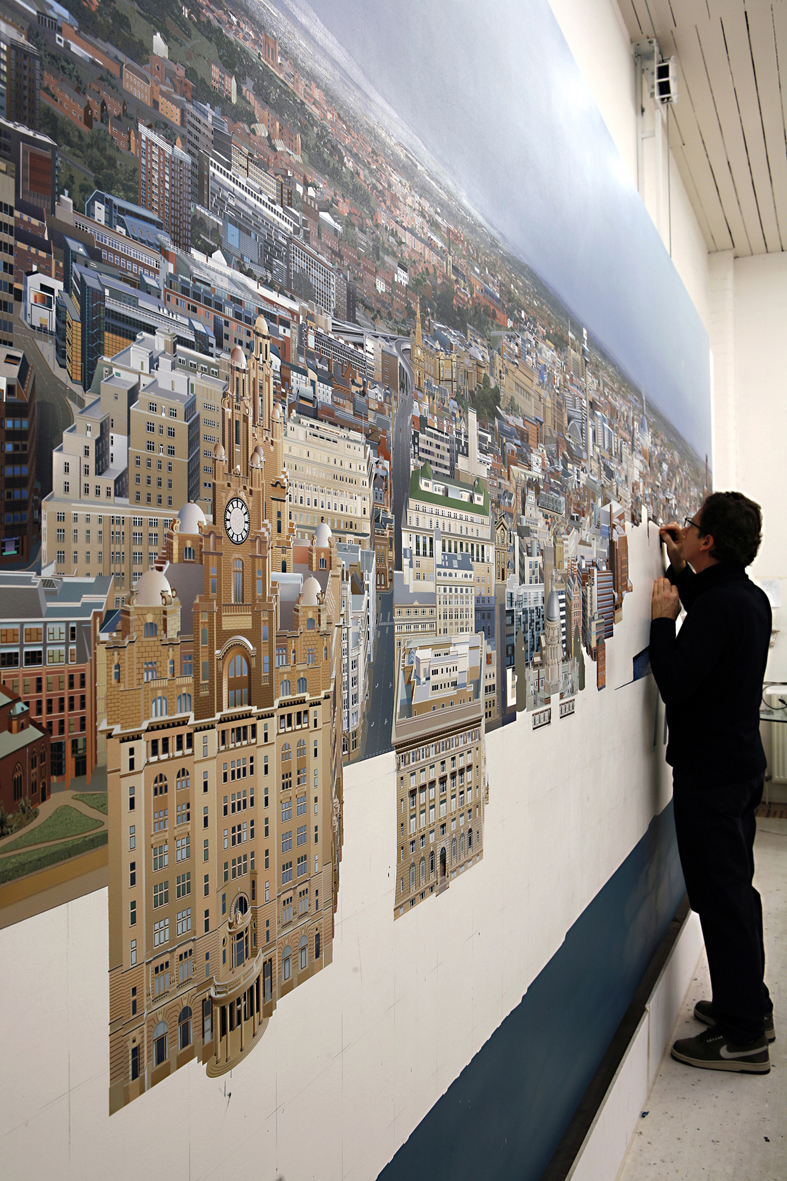
'The Liverpool Cityscape', Ben Johnson, 2008, Acrylic on Canvas, 244 x 488cm

The Liverpool Cityscape comprises 170 hectares of the city, a near bird’s-eye perspective. It encompasses several thousand individual buildings and took Johnson and up to 11 assistants 24,000 person hours to complete it. In making The Liverpool Cityscape, Johnson explored the city, (taking over 3000 reference photographs) considered alternative viewpoints, consulted with architects and historians, as well as the people of Liverpool, and absorbed the city’s distinctive atmosphere. Thousands of detailed drawings were produced before the execution of the painting in minute detail.

During February and March 2008 over 51,000 people came to see Ben work on the painting at the Walker Art Gallery in a specially created studio. A live web-cam showing his residency in the Walker was set up to enable the World to watch the creation of the painting online. The resulting exhibition had over 250,000 visits.

The Liverpool Cityscape is permanently on display in the Skylight Gallery of the new Museum of Liverpool.

== Personal life ==
Whilst at the Royal College of Art, Johnson met Sheila Kellehar, whom he later married. The couple has two sons Jamie Jay Johnson and Charlie Johnson.

== Paintings ==
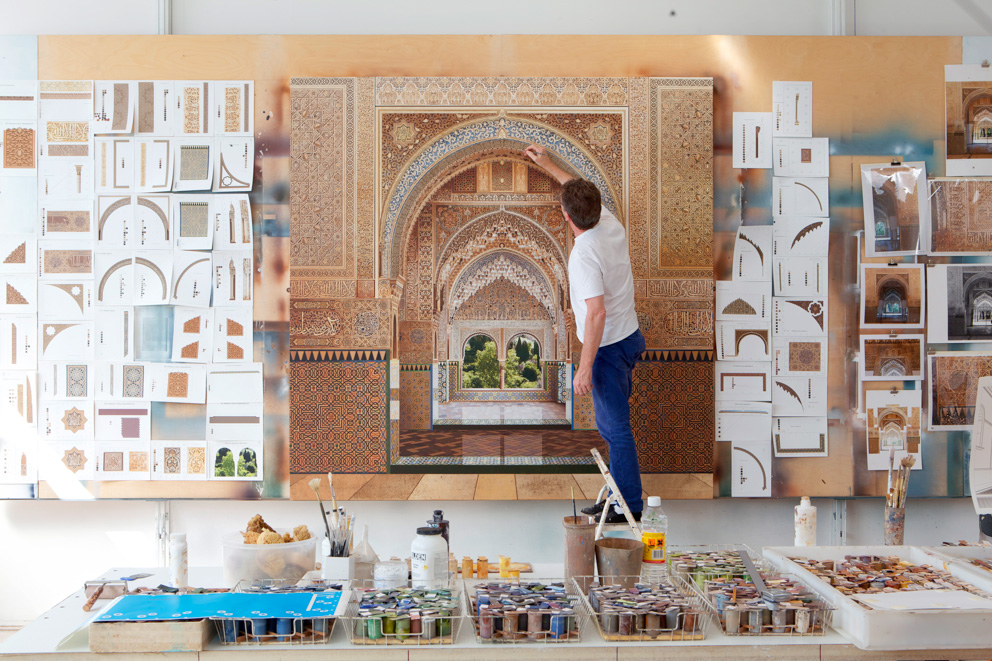
'Mirador de Lindaraja', Ben Johnson, 2013, Acrylic on canvas, 220 x 220 cm

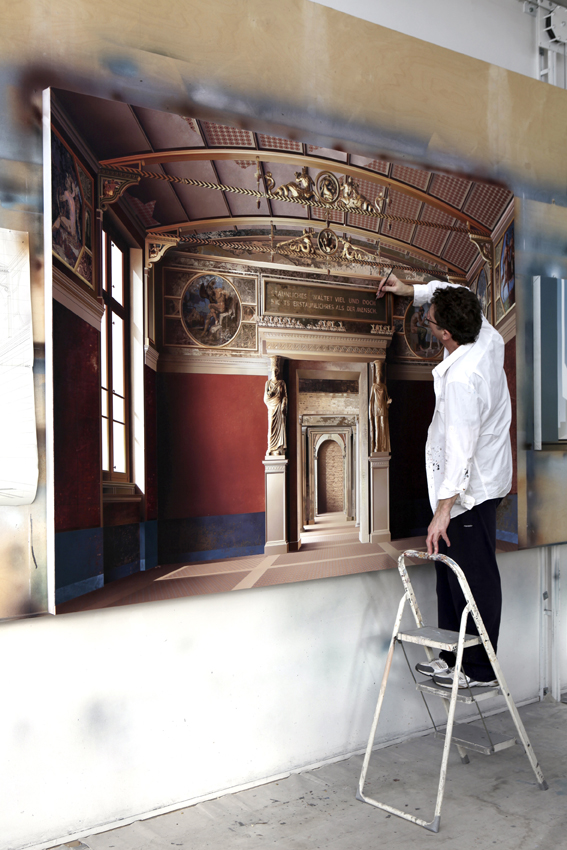
'Room of the Niobids', 2012, Acrylic on canvas, 180 x 252 cm

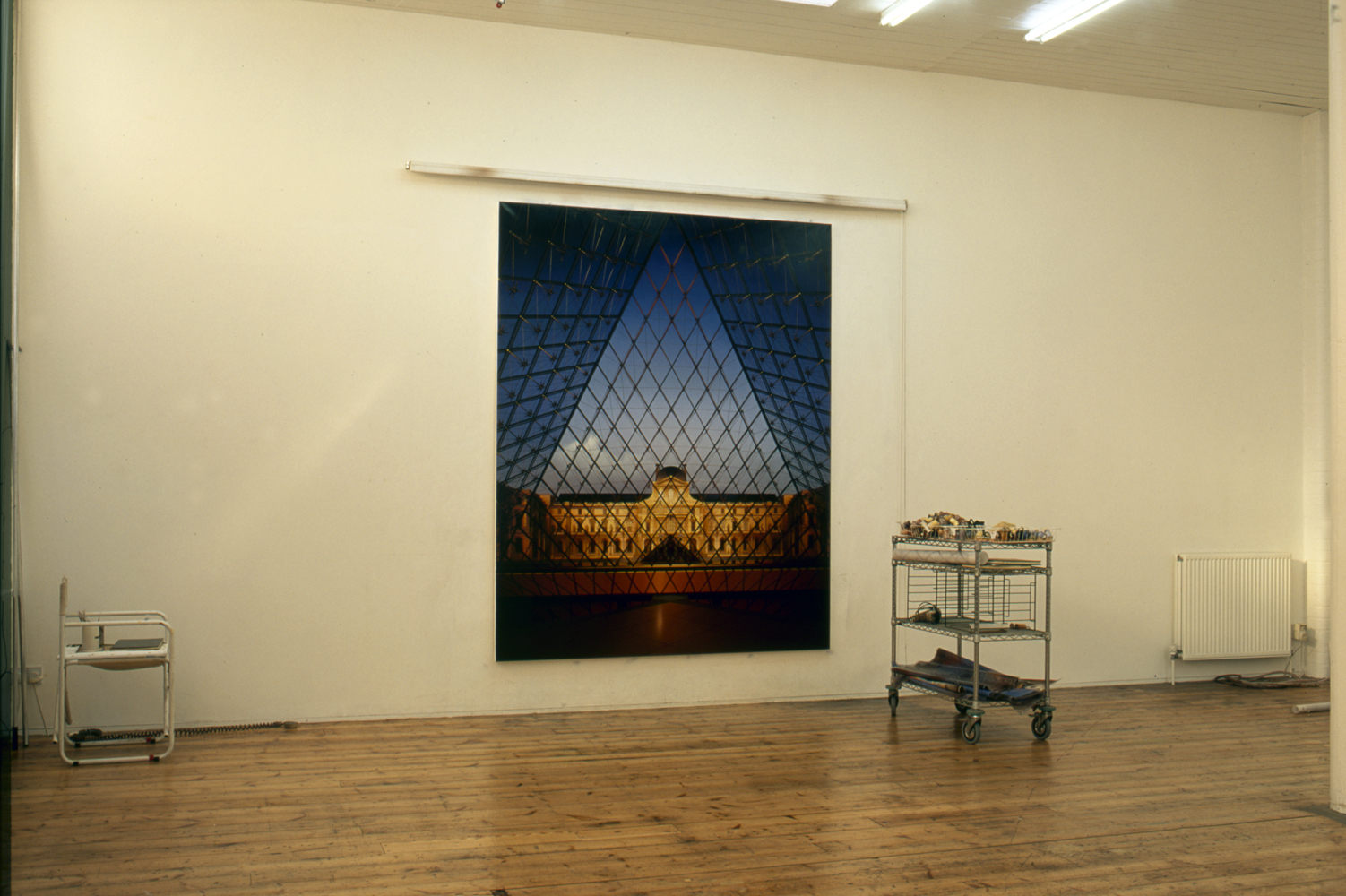
'Reflections on Past and Present, Paris', Ben Johnson, 1996, Acrylic on canvas, 254 x 203 cm

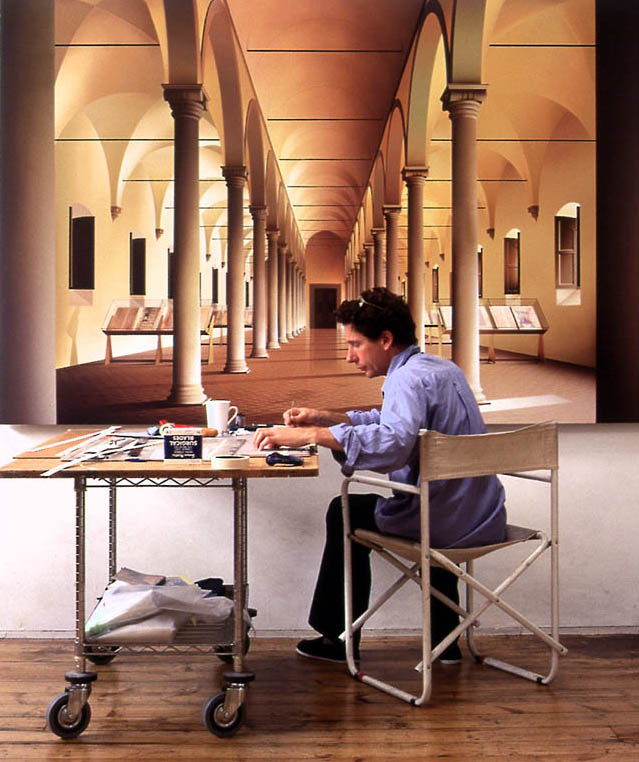
'Reading Between the Lines', Ben Johnson, 1997, Acrylic on canvas, 152 x 229 cm

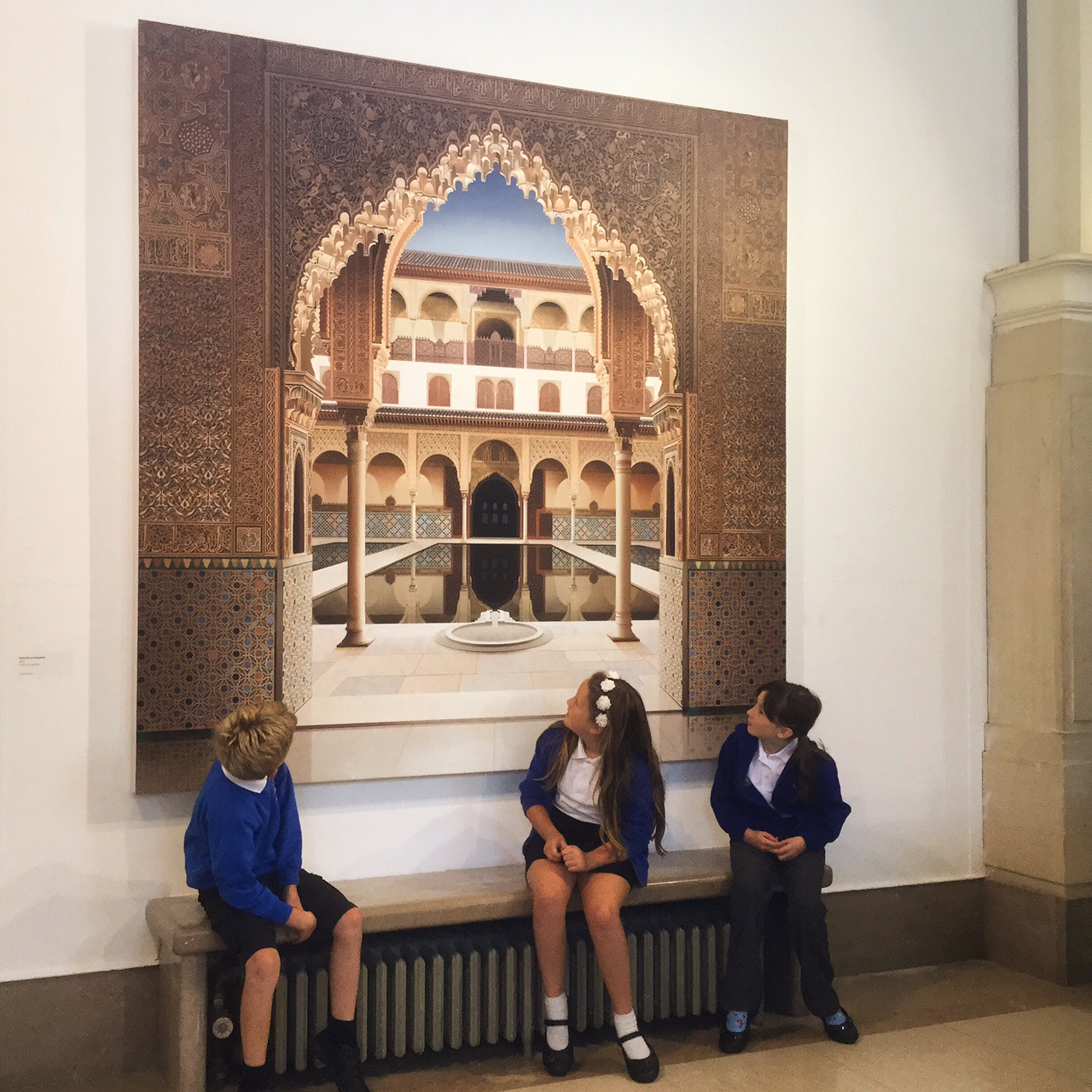
Local school children view Ben Johnson's painting 'Patio de Los Arrayanes' at retrospective at Southampton City Art Gallery.

== Works in Public Collections ==
- Walker Art Gallery, Liverpool
- Boymans-van Beuningen Museum, Rotterdam
- The British Council, London
- The Contemporary Arts Society, London
- De Beers/CSO Collection, London
- Royal Institute of British Architects, London
- Glasgow Museums, Glasgow
- Whitworth Art Gallery, Manchester
- Centre Georges Pompidou, Paris
- Victoria & Albert Museum, London
- Deutsche Bank
- British Petroleum
- Guildhall Art Gallery, Corporation of London
- Special Administrative Regional Government of Hong Kong, New Convention & Exhibition Centre, Hong Kong
- Regional Services Council Museum, Hong Kong
- Museum of London
- The British Museum
- The Government Art Collection

== Solo exhibitions ==
- 2015 "Spirit of Place: Paintings from 1969 to the present", Southampton City Art Gallery, Southampton
- 2010–11 "Modern Perspectives", National Gallery, London
- 2010 “Ben Johnson Paintings,” Alan Cristea Gallery, London
- 2008 "Ben Johnson's Liverpool Cityscape 2008 and the World Panorama Series," Walker Art Gallery, Liverpool
- 2008 Artist in Residence, Walker Art Gallery, Liverpool
- 2002 "Still Time," Blains Fine Art, London
- 2001 "Jerusalem, The Eternal City," Chester Beatty Museum, Dublin

== Selected group exhibitions ==
- 2012–14 Travelling exhibition: “Photorealism” Kunsthalle Tübingen, Germany; Museo Thyssen-Bornemisza, Spain; Kunstmuseum Thun, Switzerland; Birmingham Museum & Art Gallery, UK; Gemeentemuseum Den Haag, Netherlands; World Cultural Heritage Völklinger Hütte, Germany
- 2012 “Beyond Reality, British Painting Today” Galerie Rudolfinum, Prague
- 2012 Contributed to Norman Foster installation, Venice Biennale, Venice
