= John Garbutt (alderman) =

British alderman (born 1954)

John Garbutt JP FRGS FRSA (born 14 June 1954) was an alderman of the City of London Corporation, where he represented the ward of Walbrook. Garbutt is life vice-president of the British Red Cross, a Justice of the Peace, and a visiting professor of the University of West London. He is an alumnus of the London School of Economics and a fellow of the Royal Society of Arts and the Royal Geographical Society.

John was born in Scarborough in 1954 and attended Wellingborough Grammar School before studying at the London School of Economics. After working for Rowe and Pitman from 1975 to 1977, he moved on to become a pension manager at ICI for two years before joining Touche Remnant in 1979. He moved on again to Schroders in 1984, where he remained until became Director of Institutional Funds at Kleinwort Benson.

He has been a non-executive director of the Stobart Group since 2014.

In October 2016 Garbutt in conjunction with fellow former Touche Remnant employee Mark Henderson to set up the Guild of Investment Managers, with a view to establishing a new Livery Company.

He was pricked High Sheriff of Greater London in 2020 and in 2025.
