= Elizabeth Vallance =

British philosopher and policy maker (1945–2020)

The Right Honourable The Lady Vallance of Tummel JP
- Born: Elizabeth Mary MacGonnigal; 8 April 1945
- Died: 9 July 2020 (aged 75)
- Spouse: Iain Vallance, Baron Vallance of Tummel

Academic background
- Education: London School of Economics; University of St Andrews; London Business School
- Thesis: Women members of Parliament : backgrounds, roles and prospects. (1979)

Elizabeth May Vallance, Baroness Vallance of Tummel, JP (née MacGonnigal; 8 April 1945 – 9 July 2020) was a British philosopher, magistrate and policy maker. She held non-executive roles on various boards, and was High Sheriff of Greater London in 2009.

== Early life and education ==
Vallance was born to William Henderson MacGonnigal and Jean Brown Kirkwood. She studied philosophy at the University of St Andrews. She moved to the London School of Economics for her graduate studies, where she specialised in political philosophy and graduated in 1968. She was a Sloan Fellow at the London Business School. Her early research considered the role of women in society and the impact of women politicians on equality.

== Career ==
Vallance started her career as a lecturer in philosophy at the University of London. She moved to Queen Mary University of London, where she was promoted to Assistant Professor in Government and Politics from 1968. In 1985 she was promoted to Head of the Department of Politics, and was made an Honorary Fellow when she left in the early nineties.

After leaving a full-time academic career, Vallance moved into the public sector, and was appointed Chairperson of St George's University Hospitals NHS Foundation Trust. She would later become Chair of the children's charity I CAN, which looked to support children in developing their communication skills.

In 2006 Vallance was appointed by Tony Blair to the Committee on Standards in Public Life. In 2009 Vallance was appointed High Sheriff of Greater London. She was awarded an honorary doctorate in civil law from the University of Kent in 2013. She was made Chairman of Governors for Sutton Valence School in 2016.

Vallance was involved with various mental health charities, serving as Chairperson of the Centre for Mental Health. the National Autism Project and YoungMinds. In this capacity she oversaw the development of the YoungMinds organisational strategy, helping to implement the response to the COVID-19 pandemic.

== Select publications ==
- Vallance, Elizabeth (Elizabeth M.) (1979). Women in the House : a study of women members of Parliament. London: Athlone Press. ISBN 0-485-11186-1. OCLC 5873228.
- Vallance, Elizabeth (Elizabeth M.) (1986). Women of Europe : women MEPs and equality policy. Davies, Elizabeth V. Cambridge [Cambridgeshire]: Cambridge University Press. ISBN 0-521-26562-2. OCLC 12421256.
- Vallance, Elizabeth (Elizabeth M.) (1995). Business ethics at work. Cambridge [England]: Cambridge University Press. ISBN 0-521-40535-1. OCLC 31045995.

== Personal life ==
In 1967 Vallance married Iain Vallance, Baron Vallance of Tummel, with whom she had two children. She died in July 2020.
