= Iain Vallance =

British businessman (born 1943)

The Right Honourable The Lord Vallance of Tummel FRSA
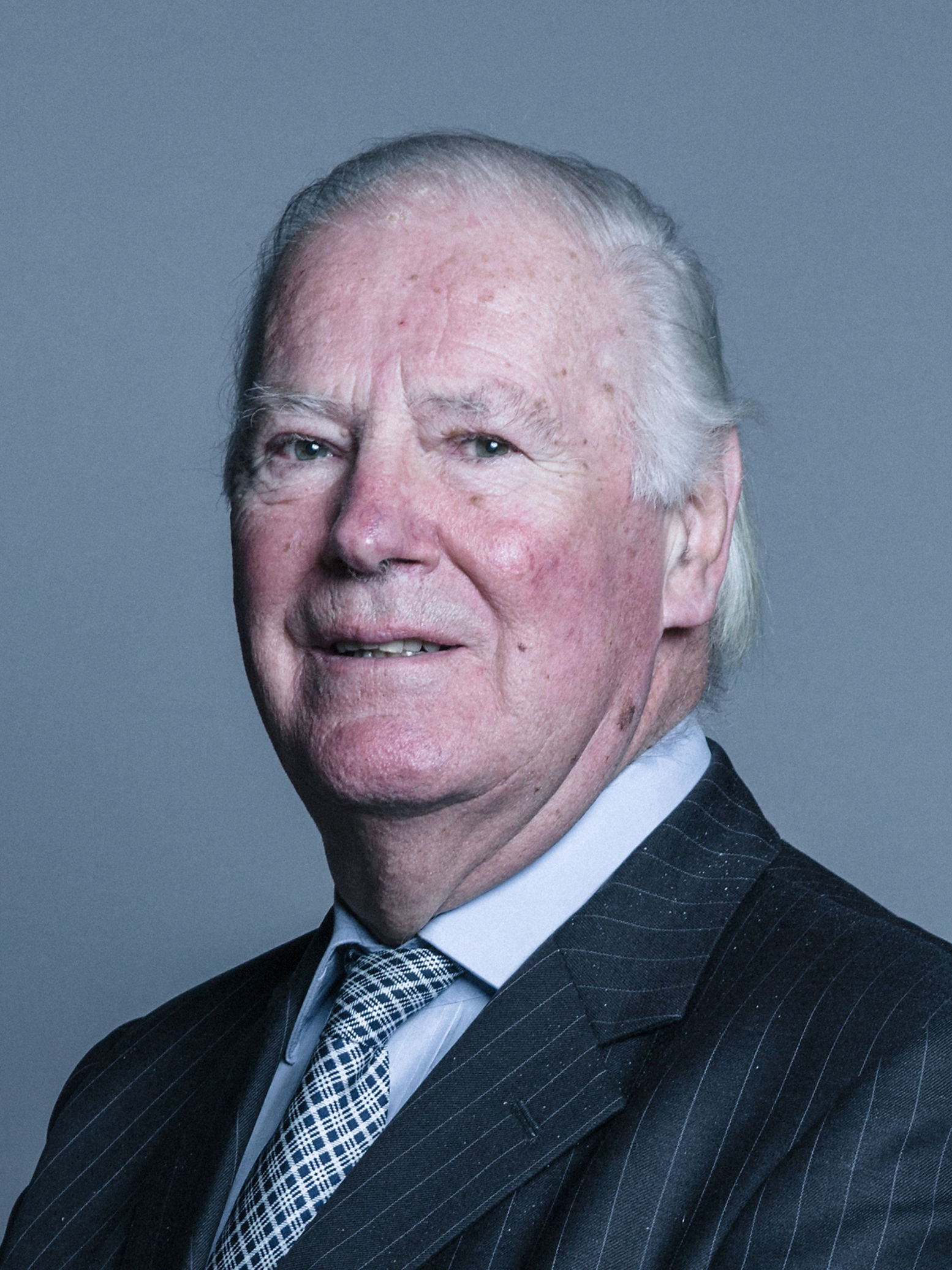

Member of the House of Lords
- Lord Temporal
- Life peerage 22 June 2004 – 13 January 2020

Personal details
- Born: May 20, 1943 (age 83)
- Party: Liberal Democrats

Iain David Thomas Vallance, Baron Vallance of Tummel, FRSA (born 20 May 1943) is a British businessman and a retired Liberal Democrat member of the House of Lords.

== Early life and education ==
Vallance was educated at the Edinburgh Academy, Dulwich College, London and The Glasgow Academy. In 1965 he graduated from Brasenose College, Oxford with a Bachelor of Arts in English language and literature, and in 1972 from the London Business School with a Master of Science in business administration.

== Career ==
=== Post Office ===
Vallance worked in the Post Office from 1966 to 1981, as director of central finance from 1976 to 1978, as director of telecommunications finance from 1978 to 1979 and as director of materials department from 1979 to 1981.

=== BT ===
In 1981 he moved to the soon to be privatised British Telecommunications, for which he worked until 2002. After a period in finance, Vallance became Chief of Operations in 1985, and Chief Executive from 1986 to 1995, as chairman from 1987 until, with many investors calling for his resignation, he resigned as chairman in 2001, and finally served as president emeritus from 2001 to 2002. In 1999 he made a speech to the Telecoms Managers Association, which led to him being called the lollipop man:

Iain Vallance: When it comes to the mass deployment of new technology across our network, BT has the unenviable task of the lollipop man. His job is to restrain the over-exuberant children from dashing across the road at will, and to ensure that the crossing is made safely and in an orderly fashion.

=== The Greenbury Committee ===
In 1995 Vallance was a member of the Greenbury committee which produced a report, known as the Greenbury Report, into executive remuneration. The report was formally commissioned at the behest of the CBI, although in his memoirs Michael Heseltine claims that he personally instigated the formation of the committee.

Vallance's appointment to the committee came despite previous high-profile controversy over his own pay at BT.

=== Siemens ===
Since 2003 he has been member of the supervisory board of Siemens.

== Honours ==
He was made a Knight Bachelor in 1994 and was created a life peer with the title Baron Vallance of Tummel, of Tummel in Perth and Kinross on 22 June 2004.

Vallance also received an Honorary Doctorate from Heriot-Watt University in 1995

== Family ==
Vallance married Elizabeth Mary McGonnigill in 1967; they had one daughter and a son. Lady Vallance died in 2020.

Orders of precedence in the United Kingdom
Preceded by The Lord Broers	Gentlemen; Baron Vallance of Tummel	Followed by The Lord Young of Norwood Green
Business positions
Preceded by Sir George Jefferson	Chairman of BT; 1987–2001	Succeeded by Sir Christopher Bland
