= Khalili Collection of Swedish Textiles =

Private collection of textile art

The Khalili Collection of Swedish Textiles
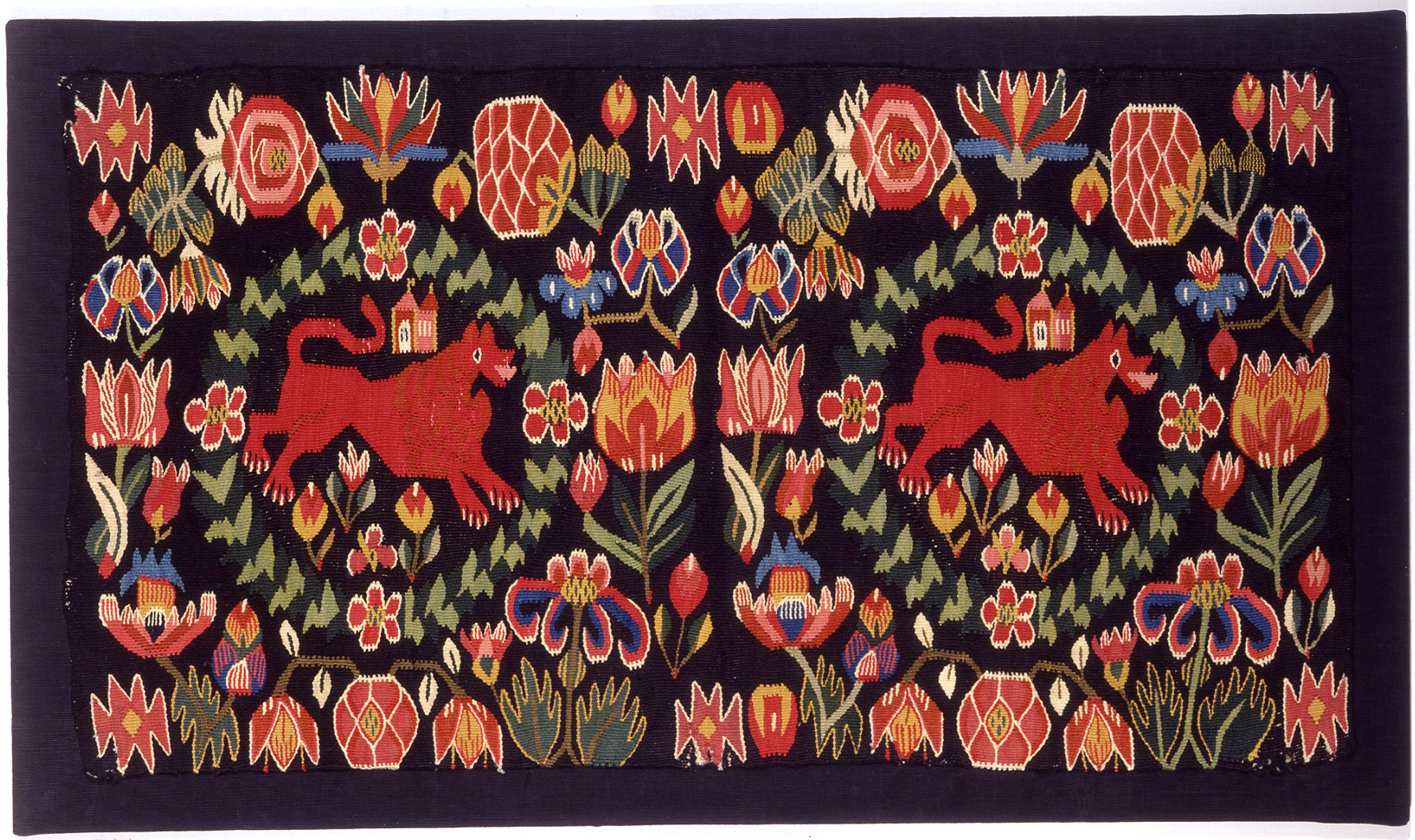
- Carriage Cushion Cover (Two Lions in Floral Roundels), Scania, Bara district, late 18th century
- Curators: Nasser D. Khalili (founder); Dror Elkvity (curator and chief co-ordinator); Viveka Hansen (special advisor)
- Size (no. of items): 100
- Website: www.khalilicollections.org/all-collections/swedish-textiles/

The Khalili Collection of Swedish Textiles is a private collection of textile art assembled by the British scholar, collector and philanthropist Nasser D. Khalili. The collection was built up over a period of 25 years and contains 100 works. It is one of eight collections assembled, conserved, published and exhibited by Khalili, each of which is considered among the most important in its field. In 2008 it was described as "the only extensive collection of Swedish flatweaves outside the country". The collection consists mostly of textile panels, cushion and bed covers from the Scania region of southern Sweden, dating in the main from a hundred-year period between the mid-18th and mid-19th centuries. The majority of the pieces in the collection were made for wedding ceremonies in the region. While they played a part in the ceremonies, they were also a reflection of the artistry and skill of the weaver. Their designs often consist of symbolic illustrations of fertility and long life. Khalili writes that he created the collection because of the tendency of art historians and the public to undervalue art whose creators are anonymous.

== Background: the high era of Swedish textile art ==
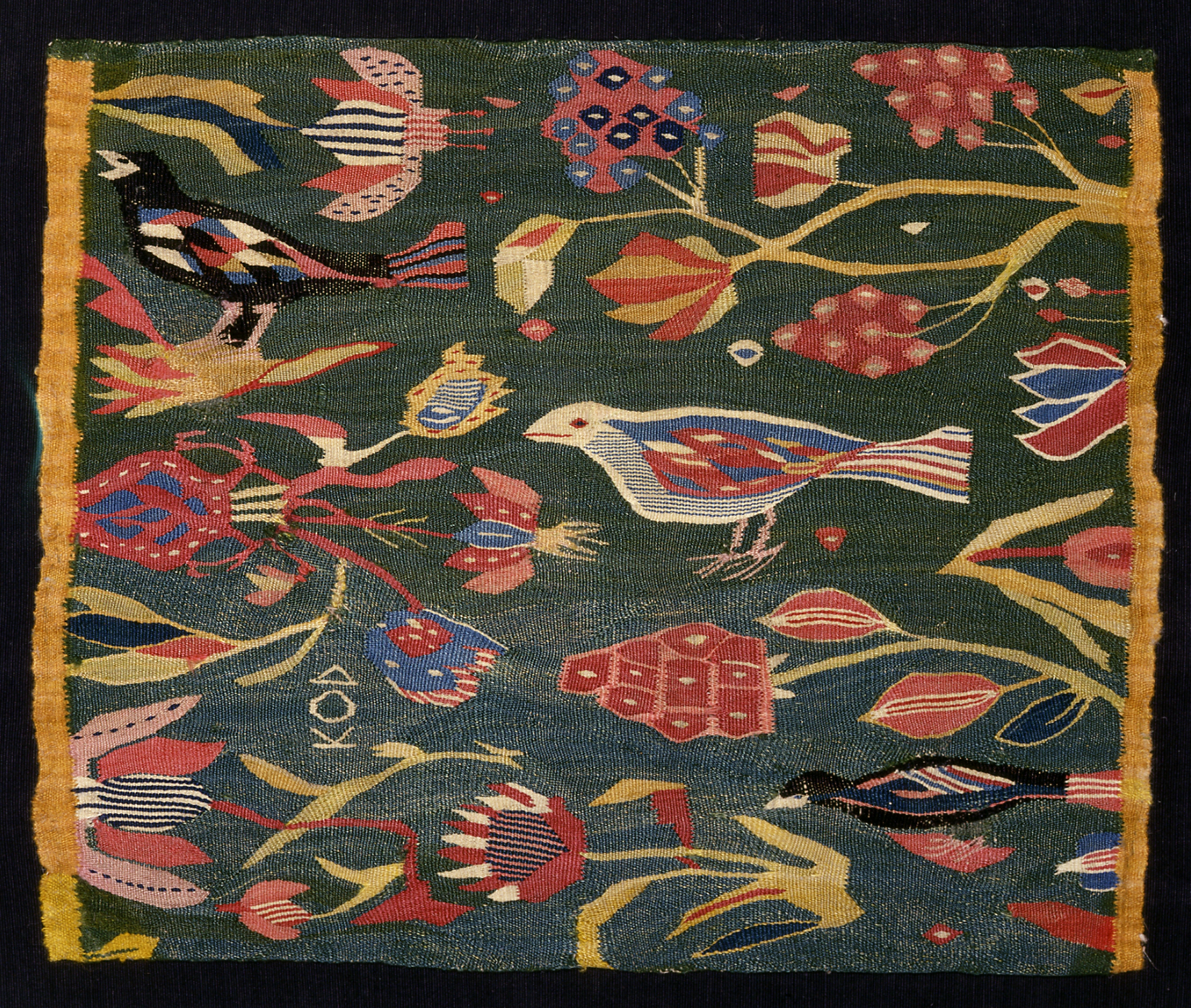
Dove-tail tapestry (birds and vines) from Torna or Bara district, Scania, late 18th century

Handwoven textile art flourished in Scania from the mid-eighteenth to the mid-nineteenth century. Employment in Scania was mainly in farming, and the early eighteenth century was a time of relative peace and prosperity for farmers, with far fewer epidemics than previously. The women of land-owning families, with the skills for making clothes and furnishings, thus had the leisure time and materials to make textiles with a focus on beauty rather than for use as covering. These textiles would usually be kept in a wooden chest, only brought out for special occasions or for airing. Wealthy farms would often have a dedicated chamber for these chests.

The creators of these works were exclusively women: farmers' wives, other female members of the family, or occasionally maids. Some works bear initials, but the identity of the creators is unknown. The creation of a dowry was an important tradition, and for each wedding the bride would demonstrate her skill by creating unique textiles with symbolic decorations. From the mid-nineteenth century onwards, the collections were mostly sold off and put to everyday use, subjecting them to wear. Only a few thousand works from this period survive intact to the present day.

=== Techniques and designs ===
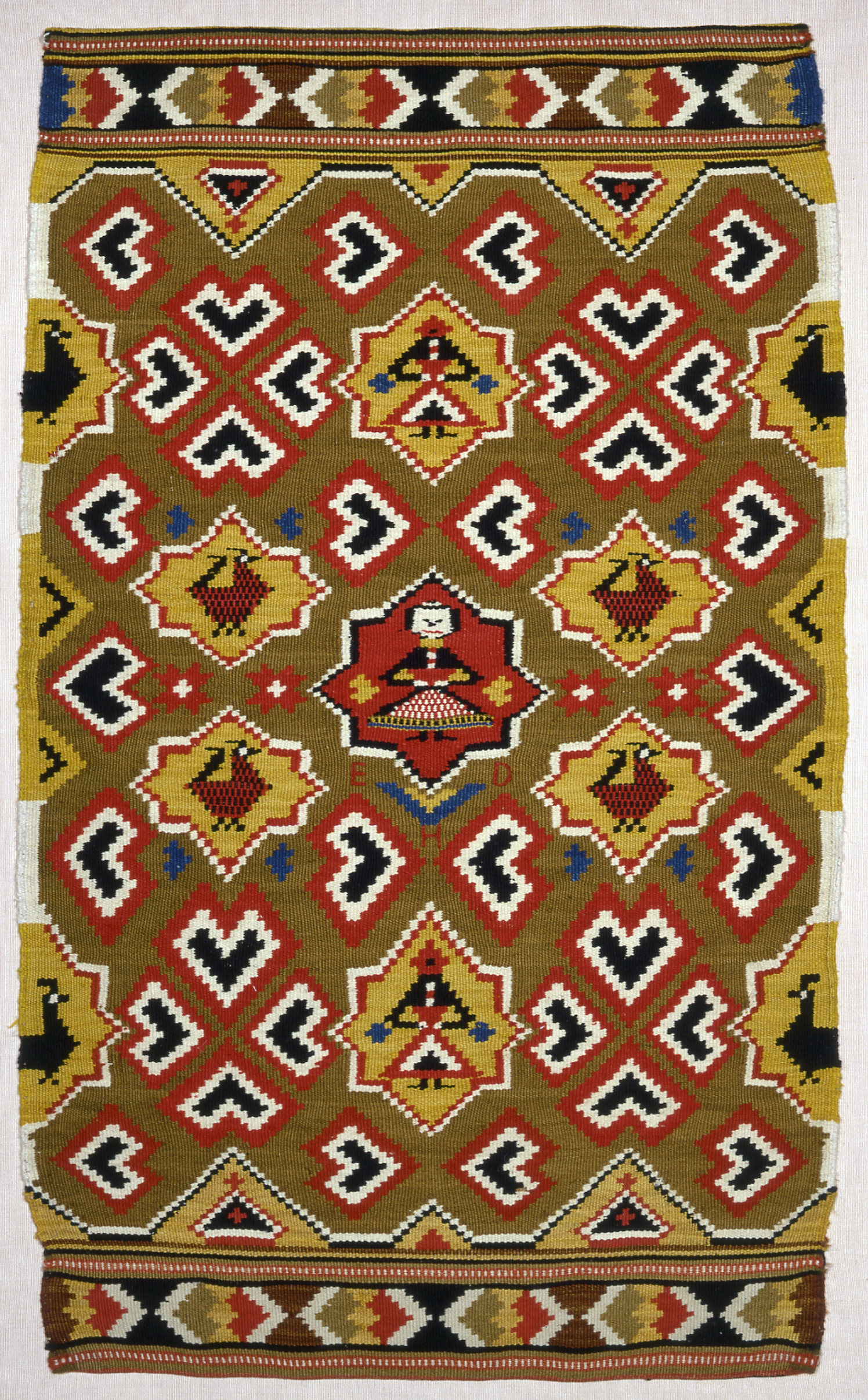
Interlocked tapestry (Women and Birds in Stars and Hearts) from Ingelstads district, Scania, first half of the 19th century

- Dove-tail tapestry, also called flamskväv ("Flemish weave"): these are named for the joins between areas of colour, where weft threads of different areas connect around the same warp thread. This technique was common among wealthy Malmö households from the mid sixteenth century to the mid eighteenth. Many tapestries from this era have been lost in war and in fires. These tapestries are usually pictorial, depicting people, animals or flowers on a dark background. Religious scenes, especially the Annunciation, were common subjects. Hunting was another common subject.
- Interlocked tapestry or rölakan (various spellings): double interlocked tapestry, in which the weft threads interlock on the reverse of the textile, was a common technique in southern Sweden. Designs of these tapestries were typically geometrical, including stars, rosettes and octagons. Zig-zag patterns representing lightning, in a variety of colours and widths, were commonly used as both a motif and a background pattern. Interlocked tapestries mostly used linen for the warp threads and wool for the weft, with other fibres like hemp, jute, and cotton used much less frequently.
- Simple weaves: simple weaves with little or no pattern were normally used for parts of fabrics, including backings or foundations to which more decorative layers would be added.
- Weft patterning: in continuous weft patterning, weft threads do not turn at the edge of a motif. In extra-weft patterning, the pattern is produced by an additional set of weft threads. This is an old technique, dating back to Viking times, and was often used for the backs of textiles whose fronts were created with interlocked tapestry. There are several distinct styles of extra-weft patterning, including krabbasnär ("crab-snare"), halvkrabba ("half-crab"), munkabälte ("monk's belt"), opphämta ("up-catch") and dukagäng ("table-path").
- Knotted-pile weaves: flossa (piled weavings) were common as cushion or bed covers from the eighteenth century onwards. Coloured wool was wrapped around pairs of warp threads to create the pile surface, either by being cut or left as loops.
- Embroideries: these can be schattersöm ("wool embroidery"), which have an embroidered pattern on a plain background, or korsstygn ("cross-stitch") and tvistsöm ("twist-stitch") which involve a fully-embroidered surface.

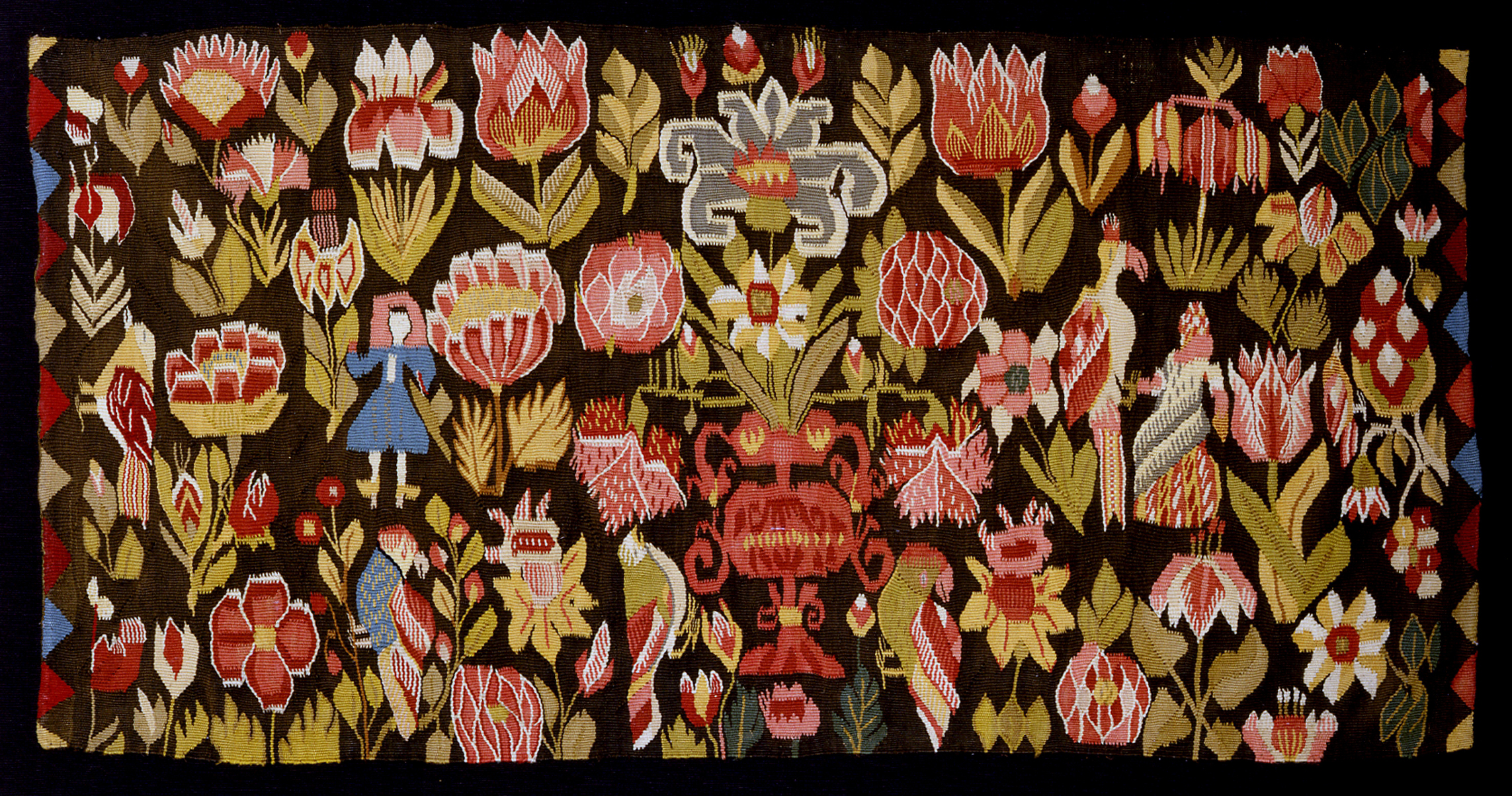
Dove-tail tapestry (Flowers, Birds and People) from Torna district, Scania, second half of the 18th century

The textiles use variations of a set of design motifs, including hunt scenes, stars, and geometrical shapes. Despite this, each textile is different, varying by colour, size, positioning and combination of the motifs. Designs show a lot of similarity across the different techniques, apart from dove-tail tapestry, whose designs are more realistic and naturalistic. Whereas stylised animals within octagons are a common motif for the other textiles, dove-tail tapestries more often have a naturalistic animal or bird within a circle. A textile creator would rarely venture beyond her own village, so her imagery would have been drawn from nature and from local superstition and religion. Another influence was textile art from other cultures. For thousands of years, textiles had been traded across Europe and Asia, and pictorial designs from the Near East are known to have been imported to Sweden by the fourteenth or fifteenth century.

== Works in the collection ==
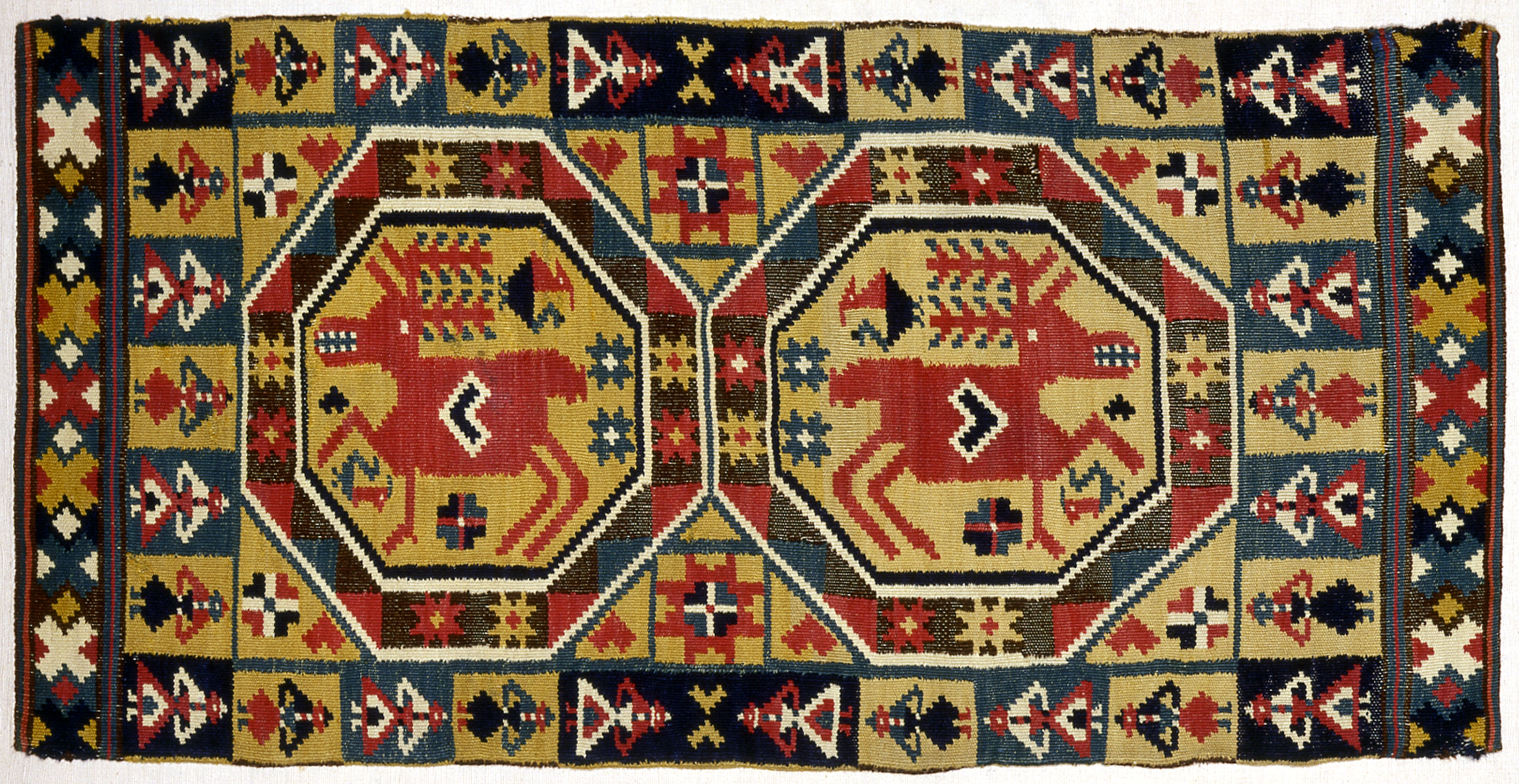
Interlocked tapestry, (Two Reindeer in Octagons with People) from Ingelstads or Herrestads district, Scania, first half of the 19th century

The hundred art works in Khalili collection show the variety as well as the skill of Swedish textile artists. The collection is particularly strong in interlocked tapestries and dove-tail tapestries, but also has examples of the other techniques. Some of the designs are repeating patterns while some have a design constructed around a central motif. Very common motifs are people, animals or birds within octagons or circles, and most permutations of creature and geometric shape are represented in the collection. Five objects in the collection depict prancing, open-mouthed deer within octagons, which is the most prized design for Swedish textiles. One particularly elaborate bed covering has six octagons each containing pictorial scenes of people or horses. An interlocked tapestry depicts bäckahästar (mythological horses with horns) and a linen cloth with extra-weft patterning depicts lions.

Dove-tail tapestries tend to be more pictorial and realistic than the other types of textiles, and this is reflected in the collection by tapestries depicting the Annunciation, red lions, and naturalistic floral arrangements. Ascending floral lattice designs are another feature that occurs across multiple objects. This design likely reflects Italian influence. An interlaced knots motif, found it many kinds of decorative art, is exemplified by embroidered works and a knotted-pile cover in the collection. This knotted-pile weaving is thought to originate in Kållandsö because of its design.

The Marby Rug is a knotted-pile carpet found in a church in Jämtland, central Sweden in 1925. It is believed to have come from fourteenth- or fifteenth-century Anatolia. It depicts pairs of birds facing a tree, under the wings of a great bird, and is the only known Eastern rug with this design. Multiple Swedish textiles copied this design, possibly copying this specific rug, and one such cross-stitch embroidery is in the Khalili Collection.

== Exhibitions ==
Although the collection is not on permanent public display, public exhibitions in three countries have drawn exclusively from the collection.

- "Swedish Textile Art: The Khalili Collection" February–March 1996, IK Foundation, Pildammarnas Vattentorn, Malmö, Sweden
- "Textiles de Scanie des XVIII et XIX Siècles dans la Collection Khalili" March–May 2000, Swedish Cultural Centre, Paris, France
- "A Monument to Love: Swedish Marriage Textiles from the Khalili Collection" September–October 2003, Boston University Art Gallery, Boston, Massachusetts, USA
