= Mark Baring (hospital administrator) =

British administrator and executive (1916–1988)

- Born: 9 June 1916
- Died: 6 February 1988 (aged 71)
- Occupation: administrator

Sir Mark Baring, KCVO (9 June 1916 – 6 February 1988) was a British hospital administrator, financial services executive and public servant.

Born on 9 June 1916, Baring was the younger son of the Hon. Windham Baring and his wife Lady Gweneth, née Ponsonby (later Cavendish), daughter of the 8th Earl of Bessborough. His father, who died aged only 42 in 1922, was the son of the 1st Earl of Cromer (a distinguished colonial administrator) and younger brother of the 2nd Earl (who was Lord Chamberlain); among other business interests, he was the managing director of the bank Messrs Baring Brothers and Company. Mark Baring attended Eton College and then Trinity College, Cambridge, before serving in the Grenadier Guards during the Second World War. After the war, he spent a year as the Military Liaison Officer in Rome before retiring from the military in 1946.

From 1950 to 1976, Baring was the managing director of the discount brokerage Seccombe Marshall and Campion Ltd. From 1966 to 1979, he was a General Commissioner for Income Tax. From 1969, he was the executive chairman of King Edward VII's Hospital in London, which (alongside traditionally treating current and former members of the Armed Forces) has often been the hospital of choice for members of the British Royal Family. In 1970, Baring was appointed a Commander of the Royal Victorian Order; he was promoted to Knight Commander in the 1980 New Year Honours. He ceased to be executive chairman in 1986 and afterwards served as vice president until his death.

Alongside his other duties, he was a magistrate for Inner London and served as the High Sheriff of Greater London in 1975–76. He died on 6 February 1988.
