= George Jefferson (engineer) =

British aeronautical engineer and businessman

Sir George Jefferson CBE
- Born: George Rowland Jefferson; 26 March 1921; London, England
- Died: 1 September 2012 (aged 91); Longford, Ireland
- Occupations: Engineer; executive
- Spouses: Irene Brown (m. 1943; died 1998); Bridget Riley (m. 1999)
- Children: 3

Sir George Rowland Jefferson CBE FRAeS (26 March 1921 – 1 September 2012) was a British aeronautical engineer and businessman. He served as the first chairman of British Telecom (BT), and was largely responsible for its privatisation in 1984.

== Early life ==
Jefferson was born in London in 1921. His father was an electrical engineer. He attended a grammar school in north-west Kent, leaving at the age of 16.

He was commissioned as an officer in the Royal Army Ordnance Corps (RAOC), later joining REME. For the latter stages of the war he worked in government research, developing automated anti-aircraft weapons.

== Career ==
In 1952 he became head of the guided weapon division of English Electric (in Hertfordshire). BAC took over EE in 1960. British Aerospace in turn took over BAC in 1977. At British Aerospace he served as a director, managing director, and then chairman, looking after the development of the Rapier anti-aircraft missile, as head of the guided weapons division.

He was made deputy chairman of the Post Office (GPO), becoming the first chairman and chief executive of British Telecom on 1 September 1980. He saw through the company's privatisation. There was widespread hostility against its privatisation. This first privatisation of a British utility would mostly lay the ground for the subsequent privatisations of the 1980s; he largely made BT's privatisation take place. Jefferson retired in 1987.

== Personal life ==
He married in Irene Brown 1943, having three sons; his first wife died in 1998. He remarried, in 1999, to Bridget Anne Riley. He received the CBE in the 1969 New Year Honours and was knighted in the 1981 New Year Honours. He later moved to Perth, Western Australia, but lived in the Republic of Ireland at the end of his life. He died from heart failure and complications of Alzheimer's disease at a care home in Longford on 1 September 2012, aged 91.

== See also ==
- Colin Baron, developer of the Rapier missile
