= High Sheriff of Greater London =

Ceremonial officer of the English county of Greater London

The office of high sheriff, as the monarch's representative in a county, is over 1,000 years old, with its establishment before the Norman Conquest. The office of high sheriff remained first in precedence in each county until the reign of Edward VII when an Order in Council in 1908 gave the lord-lieutenant the prime office under the Crown as the sovereign's personal representative. The high sheriff remains the sovereign's representative in the county for all matters relating to the judiciary and the maintenance of law and order.

The office of High Sheriff of Greater London was created in 1965 and covers the ceremonial county of Greater London. It does not cover the City of London, which has its own two sheriffs. It replaced the offices of High Sheriff of the County of London and High Sheriff of Middlesex which were abolished in 1965.

== Coat of arms ==
The office of Sheriff of Greater London was granted armorial bearings by letters patent issued by the College of Arms dated 5 December 1966. The blazon of the arms is:

Gules, two seaxes in saltire argent, pommels and hilts or, between in chief a Saxon Crown or and in base a horse courant argent.

The seaxes or short notched swords came from the arms of Essex and Middlesex, the Saxon crown from those of Middlesex and the white horse from those of Kent.

== Officeholders ==
- 1965: Major Charles Howard Kerridge Fisher, of Acton, London W.3 (First High Sheriff of Greater London)
- 1966: Sir Geoffrey Cecil Ryves Eley, of Holland Villas Road, London
- 1967: Sir Theodore Constantine, of Hunters Beck, Uxbridge Road, Stanmore.
- 1968: Seymour John Louis Egerton, of Eaton Square, London S.W.1.
- 1969: Leonard John Sparke, of Bury Street, Ruislip
- 1970: Sir John Blumenfeld Elliot, of London, W.1
- 1971: William Woolf Harris, of Bickenhall Mansions, Gloucester Place, W.1.
- 1972: Derrick Allix Pease, of Britten Street, S.W.3.
- 1973: Arthur Henry Edmond, of Northwood, Middlesex
- 1974: Kenneth Herbert Chapman, of Wentworth, Surrey
- 1975: Mark Baring, of Thurloe Square, London S.W.7.
- 1976: Alexander William Ramsay, of Caroline Place, London W.2.
- 1977: Lieut-Colonel Dennis Charles Titchener-Barrett, of Kingfisher House, Lord Napier House, Upper Mall, London W.6
- 1978: Commodore Charles Patrick Cay Noble, of Gerald Road, London S.W.1
- 1979: Peter Wyatt Kininmonth, of Ashley Court, Morpeth Terrace, London S.W.1
- 1980: Christopher Anthony Prendergast
- 1981: Roy Constantine, of Grove Park Terrace, London W.4.
- 1982: Simon Birch, of Regents Park
- 1983: Ronald Thomas Stewart Macpherson
- 1984: Sir Arthur Godfrey Taylor, of Hove, East Sussex
- 1985: Patrick Carroll Macnamara of Richmond, Surrey
- 1986: Giles Richard Carless Shepard of Savoy Hill, London
- 1987: Derek George Steel of Wimbledon
- 1988: Richard Maddock Brew of Cranley Mews, South Kensington, London SW7
- 1989: Joan Ellen Wheeler-Bennett, of London, SW6, (first woman high sheriff)
- 1990: Christabel Rosamund Scott of London SW7
- 1991: William Samuel Clive Richards of London SW1
- 1992: James Anthony Lemkin, of Frognal Close, London NW3
- 1993: Anthony Charles Everett
- 1994: Antony James Butterwick of Earl's Court Square, London SW5
- 1995: Graham James Hearne, of London NW3
- 1996: Sir Cyril Julian Hebden Taylor of Lexham Walk, London W8
- 1997: William Robert Harrison of Carlyle Square, London SW3
- 1998: John Patrick Gough, Cadogan Mansions, Sloane Square, London SW1
- 1999: Roger John Lawrence Bramble of London, SW1
- 2000: Malcolm Peter Speight Barton of London, W8
- 2001: Andrew Henry Scott of London, SW7
- 2002: Bina Shivdasani, Countess Sella Di Monteluce of London, W1
- 2003: Michael Lenox Ingall of London
- 2004: Frances Anne Cairncross
- 2005: Andrew Everard Martin Smith
- 2006: Dr Khalid Hameed of Hay Hill, Berkeley Square, London
- 2007: Jan Stephen Pethick
- 2008: Elizabeth, The Lady Vallance of Tummel
- 2009: Andrew Vladimir Rhydwen Morgan
- 2010: Ranjit Mathrani
- 2011: Lady Elizabeth Arnold
- 2012: Millie Banerjee
- 2013: David Fraser Christopher Jones
- 2014: Kevin David McGrath
- 2015: Ghazala Hameed, Baroness Hameed (spouse of Dr. Khalid Hameed (later Baron Hameed), as listed above)
- 2016: Sir Nigel Knowles
- 2017: W. James Furber
- 2018: Charles Alexander Evan Spicer
- 2019: Iqbal Wahhab, of London
- 2020: John Garbutt of London
- 2021: Lynn Cooper
- 2022: Heather Jane Phillips
- 2023: Ina De
- 2024: Millicent Leonie Grant, Romford
- 2025: John Garbutt, London
- 2026: Dhruv Prashant Patel, London
