= 1988 in association football =

The following are the association football events of the year 1988 throughout the world.

== Events ==
- March 27 – Cameroon wins the 1988 African Cup of Nations by defeating Nigeria: 1–0. The only goal in Casablanca's Stade Mohammed V is scored by Emmanuel Kundé from a penalty kick.
- June 25 – Thanks to goals from captain Ruud Gullit and top goalscorer Marco van Basten, the Netherlands defeat the Soviet Union (2–0) in the final of UEFA Euro 1988 in Munich.
- July 12 – Italian club Juventus receive The UEFA Plaque in Geneva (Switzerland) as first club in European football history to win the three main UEFA club competitions.
- 1988 Copa Libertadores – won by Nacional after defeating Newell's Old Boys on an aggregate score of 3–1.
- England – FA Cup – Wimbledon won 1–0 over Liverpool.
- The Football League celebrates its Centenary.
- With great surprise worldwide FIFA gives the 1994 FIFA World Cup to United States.
- August 24 – The Faroe Islands record their first international victory, defeating Canada 1–0.
- September 14 – Thijs Libregts makes his debut as the manager of Dutch national team with a 1–0 win over Wales, replacing successful coach Rinus Michels.
- October 1 – Soviet Union wins the Olympic gold medal in football by defeating Brazil: 2–1 after extra time in Seoul's Olympic Stadium.
- December 11 – Uruguay's Nacional wins the Intercontinental Cup in Tokyo, Japan by defeating Dutch PSV Eindhoven on penalties (7–6), after the match ended in 2–2.

== National club championships winners ==
=== Africa ===
Country	League	Team
Egypt	Egyptian Premier League	Zamalek
South Africa	NSL First Division	Mamelodi Sundowns F.C.
Zimbabwe	Zimbabwe Premier Soccer League	Zimbabwe Saints

=== Asia ===
Country	League	Team
Japan	Japan Soccer League	Yahama Motors
(Portugal) Macau	Campeonato da 1ª Divisão do Futebol	Wa Seng
Qatar	Qatar Stars League	Al-Sadd SC
Saudi Arabia	Saudi Premier League	Al Hilal SFC

=== Europe ===
Country	League	Team
Albania	Albanian National Championship	17 Nëntori
Austria	Austrian Football Bundesliga	SK Rapid Wien
Belgium	Belgian League	Club Brugge K.V.
Bulgaria	Bulgarian A Group	PFC Levski Sofia
Cyprus	Cypriot First Division	Pezoporikos Larnaca FC
Czechoslovakia	Czechoslovak First League	AC Sparta Prague
Denmark	Danish 1st Division	Brøndby IF
England	The Football League	Liverpool
Faroe Islands	Faroe Islands Premier League	Havnar Bóltfelag
Finland	Mestaruussarja	HJK Helsinki
France	Division 1	AS Monaco
East Germany	DDR-Oberliga	Berliner FC Dynamo
West Germany	Bundesliga	SV Werder Bremen
Gibraltar	Gibraltar First Division	Saint Theresa's F.C.
Greece	Alpha Ethniki	AEL
Greenland*	Greenlandic Men's Football Championship	Kissaviarsuk-33
Hungary	Nemzeti Bajnokság I	Budapest Honvéd
Israel	Liga Leumit	Hapoel Tel Aviv FC
Italy	Serie A	A.C. Milan
Luxembourg	Luxembourg National Division	Jeunesse Esch
Malta	Maltese Premier League	Hamrun Spartans F.C.
Netherlands	Eredivisie	PSV Eindhoven
Northern Ireland	Irish League	Glentoran
Norway	Norwegian First Division	Rosenborg
Poland	Ekstraklasa	Górnik Zabrze
Portugal	Primeira Liga	F.C. Porto
Republic of Ireland	League of Ireland	Dundalk
Romania	Liga 1	FC Steaua București
San Marino	Campionato Sammarinese di Calcio	S.P. Tre Fiori
Scotland	Scottish Premier League	Celtic
Soviet Union	Soviet Top League	FC Dnipro Dnipropetrovsk
Spain	La Liga	Real Madrid
Sweden	Allsvenskan	Malmö FF
Switzerland	Nationalliga A	Neuchâtel Xamax
Turkey	1.Lig	Galatasaray S.K.
Vatican City	Campionato della Città del Vaticano	Servici Tecnici
(Socialist Federal Republic of Yugoslavia) Yugoslavia	Yugoslav First League	Red Star Belgrade

*Greenland was not affiliated with UEFA and never has been, but it's part of the sovereign state of Denmark which is located in Europe.

=== North and South America ===
Country	League	Team
Argentina	Argentine Primera División	Newell's Old Boys
Bolivia	Liga de Fútbol Profesional Boliviano	Bolívar
Brazil	Campeonato Brasileiro Série A	Esporte Clube Bahia
Canada	Canadian Soccer League	Vancouver 86ers
Chile	Liga Chilena de Fútbol: Primera División	Cobreloa
Colombia	Mustang Cup	Millonarios
Ecuador	Campeonato Ecuatoriano de Fútbol	Emelec
Mexico	Mexican Primera División	America
Paraguay	Liga Paraguaya: Primera División	Olimpia
Peru	Peruvian Primera División	Sporting Cristal
United States	American Soccer League	Washington Diplomats
United States	Western Soccer Alliance	F.C. Seattle Storm
Uruguay	Primera División Uruguaya	Danubio
Venezuela	Primera División Venezolana	CS Marítimo

=== Oceania ===
Country	League	Team
Australia	National Soccer League	Marconi-Fairfield
Fiji	Fiji National Football League	Lautoka F.C.
New Caledonia	New Caledonian Super League	CA Saint Louis
New Zealand	New Zealand National Soccer League	Christchurch United
Papua New Guinea	Papua New Guinea National Championship	Lahi Guria
Solomon Islands	Honiara FA League	Honiara Rangers
Tuvalu	Tuvalu League Tournament	Nauti FC
Tonga	Tongatapu Inter Club Championship	Ngele'ia FC

== International tournaments ==
- African Cup of Nations in Morocco (March 13 – 27 1988)
  1. Cameroon
  2. Nigeria
  3. Algeria
- Olympic Games in Seoul, South Korea (September 17 – October 1, 1988)
  1. Soviet Union
  2. Brazil
  3. West Germany
- UEFA European Football Championship in West Germany (June 10 – 25 1988)
  1. Netherlands
  2. Soviet Union
  3. West Germany and Italy

== Births ==
=== January ===
- 1 January:
  - Diego Basto, Colombian footballer
  - Sékou Fadiga, Ivorian footballer
  - Isaac Mattia, South Sudanese footballer
- 3 January: Crispin Olando, Kenyan international footballer
- 4 January:
  - Anestis Argyriou, Greek footballer
  - Maximilian Riedmüller, German footballer
- 8 January:
  - Vitaliy Hoshkoderya, Ukrainian footballer
  - Adrián López, Spanish footballer
  - Michael Mancienne, English footballer
- 9 January: Marc Crosas, Spanish footballer
- 20 January:
  - Uwa Elderson Echiéjilé, Nigerian international
  - Jougle (Jougle Manoel Rodrigues), Brazilian footballer
  - Jeffrén Suárez, Spanish footballer
- 23 January: Marko Šimić, Croatian junior international
- 28 January: Alaa Ali, Egyptian footballer (d. 2019)
- 29 January: Bohdan Karkovskyi, Ukrainian former professional footballer

=== February ===
- 3 February: Pouria Gheidar, Iranian footballer
- 4 February: Sergei Yuvenko, Russian professional football player
- 12 February:
  - Linda Bengtsson, Swedish footballer
  - Nicolás Otamendi, Argentine international football player
- 23 February: Nicolás Gaitán, Argentine international football player
- 24 February: Levi Hanssen, New Zealand/Faroe Islands footballer
- 26 February: İsmail Baydil, Turkish footballer
- 28 February: Jorge Gastélum, Mexican footballer
- 29 February:
  - Mikel Balenziaga, Spanish footballer
  - Fabiano Ribeiro de Freitas, Brazilian footballer
  - Scott Golbourne, English footballer
  - Benedikt Höwedes, German footballer
  - Viktor Prodell, Swedish footballer
  - Evgeni Cheremisin, Russian footballer
  - Hamza Ziad, Algerian footballer

=== March ===
- 11 March: Joaelton (Joaelton Jonathan Sampaio), Brazilian footballer
- 21 March: Lee Cattermole, English footballer

=== April ===
- 3 April: Tim Krul, Dutch international
- 11 April: Oleg Sibalov, Russian professional football player
- 12 April: Fred Santana, Brazilian footballer
- 23 April: Vitali Seletskiy, Russian professional football coach and former player

=== May ===
- 4 May:
  - Artur Gieraga, Polish footballer
  - Michael Ludäscher, Swiss footballer
- 15 May: Ruslan Tarala, former Russian professional footballer
- 17 May: Jennison Myrie-Williams, English youth international
- 21 May: Jonny Howson, English footballer
- 23 May: Angelo Ogbonna, Italian footballer
- 25 May: Adrián González Morales, Spanish junior international
- 29 May:
  - Łukasz Bocian, Polish footballer
  - Alex Porfirio, Brazilian footballer

=== June ===
- 1 June: Javier Hernández, Mexican international football player
- 9 June: Martín Castillo, Mexican professional footballer
- 15 June: Cristopher Toselli, Chilean footballer
- 22 June: Silvio Arango, Colombian former footballer
- 23 June: Adrian Chomiuk, Polish footballer
- 24 June: Micah Richards, England international footballer

=== July ===
- 2 July: Abderahmane Hachoud, Algerian international footballer
- 6 July: Gustavo Mencia, Paraguayan footballer
- 8 July:
  - Enoch Oteng, Belgian footballer
  - Cédric De Troetsel, Belgian retired footballer
- 18 July: Elvin Mammadov, Azerbaijani international
- 24 July: Irina Birvagen, Kazakhstani former footballer

=== August ===
- 5 August: Eddie Nolan, Irish international footballer
- 6 August: José Márquez, Guatemalan footballer
- 28 August: Ray Jones, English footballer (d. 2007)
- 31 August: Faber Cañaveral, Colombian professional footballer

=== September ===
- 2 September: Javi Martínez, Spanish international footballer
- 5 September:
  - Nuri Şahin, Turkish footballer
  - Felipe Caicedo, Ecuadorian association footballer
- 13 September: Luis Rentería, Panamanian international footballer (died 2014)
- 18 September:
  - Ferdinand Sinaga, Indonesian international
- 23 September: Anthony Straker, English footballer
- 25 September: Chinta Chandrashekar Rao, Indian footballer
- 28 September: Alex Marello, Canadian professional soccer player

=== October ===
- 4 October: Marcos Román, Nicaraguan professional footballer
- 7 October: Diego Costa, Spanish international
- 13 October: Marco Gasparri, Italian professional footballer
- 14 October
  - Will Atkinson, English footballer
  - Mario Titone, Italian footballer
- 15 October: Mesut Özil, German international football player

=== November ===
- 7 November: Andri Abubakar, Indonesian footballer
- 15 November: Sascha Imholz, Swiss footballer
- 17 November: Salome Khubuluri, Georgian footballer
- 18 November: Andreas Niederquell, German former footballer
- 20 November: Soheil Rahmani, Iranian footballer

=== December ===
- 5 December
  - Cristian Machín, Uruguayan footballer
  - Kamil Cholerzyński, Polish professional footballer
- 9 December: Ibrahim Morad, Emirati footballer
- 10 December:
  - Wilfried Bony, Ivorian international footballer
  - Mitchell Donald, Dutch footballer
  - Neven Subotić, Serbian international footballer
- 15 December: Yael Falcón, Argentine football referee
- 17 December: Thaísa Moreno, Brazilian footballer
- 21 December: Anastasios Christofileas, Greek professional footballer

== Deaths ==
- January 27 – Kemal Faruki, Turkish football player (77)
- February 8 – Pietro Arcari, Italian forward, winner of the 1934 FIFA World Cup and one of four Italian players who won the FIFA World Cup while never being capped. (78)
- February 26 – Euclydes Barbosa, Brazilian defender, semi-finalist at the 1938 FIFA World Cup. (82)
- March 13 – Rodolpho Barteczko, Brazilian striker, semi-finalist at the 1938 FIFA World Cup. (77)
- March 16 – Erich Probst, Austrian football player (60)
- October 19 – Marcos Carneiro de Mendonça, Brazilian goalkeeper, the inaugural goalkeeper for Brazil National Football Team and winner of the 1919 South American Championship and 1922 South American Championship. (93)
