= Arango (surname) =

Arango is a surname. Notable people with the surname include:

- Alfredo Arango (footballer) (1945–2005), Colombian footballer
- Alicia Arango (born 1958), Colombian politician and businesswoman
- Andrés Pastrana Arango (born 1954), President of Colombia from 1998 to 2002
- Ángel Arango (1926–2013), Cuban science fiction writer
- Carlos Arango (1928–2014), Colombian footballer
- Carlos Arango Vélez (1897–1974), Colombian politician
- Celso Arango (born 1968), Spanish psychiatrist
- Cristian Arango (born 1995), Colombian footballer
- Daniel Arango, Colombian-born American artist
- Débora Arango (1907–2005), Colombian artist
- Emiliana Arango (born 2000), Colombian tennis player
- Fermín Arango (1874–1962), Spanish-Argentine painter
- Gonzalo Arango (1931–1976), Colombian poet, journalist, and philosopher
- Graciela Arango de Tobón (1931–2000), Colombian songwriter
- Jaime Jaramillo Arango (1897–1962), Colombian academic, diplomat, and politician
- Jerónimo Arango (1927–2020), Mexican businessman
- Johan Arango (born 1991), Colombian footballer
- Jorge Arango (1917–2007), Colombian-born US architect
- Juan Arango (born 1980), Venezuelan footballer
- Juan Andrés Arango (born 1976), Colombian-Canadian film director
- Julián Arango (born 1969), Colombian television actor
- Julio Arango (born 1950), Colombian swimmer
- Julio Franco Arango (1914−1980), Colombian Roman Catholic bishop
- Octavio Betancourt Arango (1928–2017), Colombian Roman Catholic prelate
- Oscar Arango (born 1965), Colombian fencer
- Ricardo Adolfo de la Guardia Arango (1899–1969), President of Panama from 1941 to 1945
- Roberto Arango, Cuban American politician
- Rogelio Arango (born 1959), Colombian racing cyclist
- Salvador Arango (born 1944), Colombian sculptor
- Silvio Arango (born 1988), Colombian footballer
- Tim Arango, American journalist
