= Chomiuk =

Chomiuk is a surname. Notable people with the surname include:

- Adrian Chomiuk (born 1988), Polish footballer
- Laura Chomiuk, American astronomer
