= Roman Solis =

Roman Solis is the name of:

- Román Alí Solís López, Mexican baseball catcher
- Román Solís Zelaya, Costa Rican jurist
- Román Villalobos Solís, Costa Rican cyclist
- Marcos Antonio Román Solís, Nicaraguan footballer
