= Marello =

Marello is an Italian surname. Notable people with the surname include:

- Alex Marello (born 1988), Canadian soccer player
- José Luis Marello (born 1965), Argentine sprint canoeist
- Joseph Marello (1844–1895), Italian Roman Catholic bishop
  - Joseph Marello Institute, a private Catholic high school named after him
- Maria Marello (born 1961), Italian discus thrower
