= Khubuluri =

Khubuluri (Georgian: ხუბულური) is a surname of Georgian origin. Notable people with the surname include:

- Salome Khubuluri (born 1988), Georgian footballer
- Tengiz Khubuluri (born 1955), Georgian judoka
