= Pablo Uranga =

Spanish painter

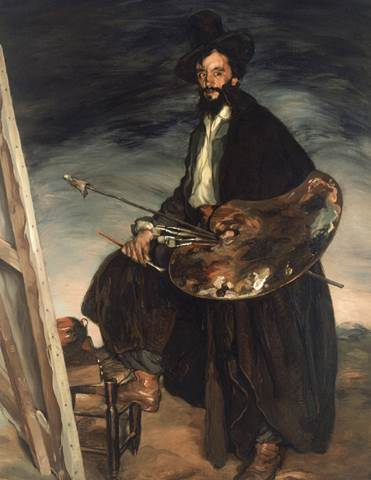
Pablo Uranga; portrait by Ignacio Zuloaga (1905)

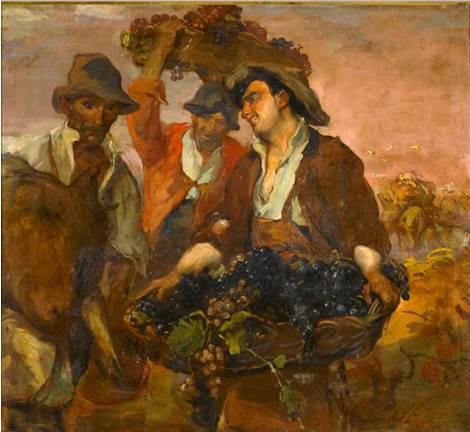
The Grape Harvest

Pablo Uranga Díaz de Arcaya (26 June 1861 – 7 November 1934) was a Spanish painter of Basque ancestry; known mostly for portraits and genre scenes. He was also one of the founders of the Association of Basque Artists.

== Biography ==
He was born in Vitoria. Both of his parents died while he was still a child and he moved frequently between foster families. His first art lessons came at the age of seventeen at the School of Fine Arts of Álava. He remained there until 1880, when he moved to Madrid to complete his studies at the Real Academia de Bellas Artes de San Fernando. While there, he frequented the Museo del Prado, where he made and sold copies of works by the Old Masters.

Afterward, influenced by his friend, the sculptor Paco Durrio, he went to Paris where he mingled with other Spanish artists of his generation, such as Ignacio Zuloaga and Santiago Rusiñol, with whom he shared an apartment on Île Saint-Louis. He held his first exhibition in 1897. During his stay there, his work increasingly began to display elements of Impressionism, although they continued to be based on classical Spanish styles.

Upon returning to Spain, he spent some time in Segovia, where he shared a studio with Zuloaga, in the workshop of his uncle, the ceramicist Daniel Zuloaga. Eventually, he married and settled in Elgeta Gipuzkoa. Later, he and Zuloaga collaborated on murals at the casino in Bermeo (destroyed by a flood in 1983).

From 1924 to 1925, he visited the United States and Cuba, where he held several showings. During his final years, he concentrated on portraits, including a posthumous one of Karl Marx on the fiftieth anniversary of his death. Uranga died in San Sebastián, aged 73.
