= Fadiga =

Fadiga is a surname. Notable people with the surname include:

- Bandiougou Fadiga (born 2001), French footballer
- Khalilou Fadiga (born 1974), Senegalese footballer
- Luciano Fadiga (born 1961), Italian neurophysiologist
- Noah Fadiga (born 1999), Belgian footballer
- Sékou Fadiga (born 1988), Ivorian footballer
