= Ignacio Zuloaga =

Spanish painter (1870–1945)

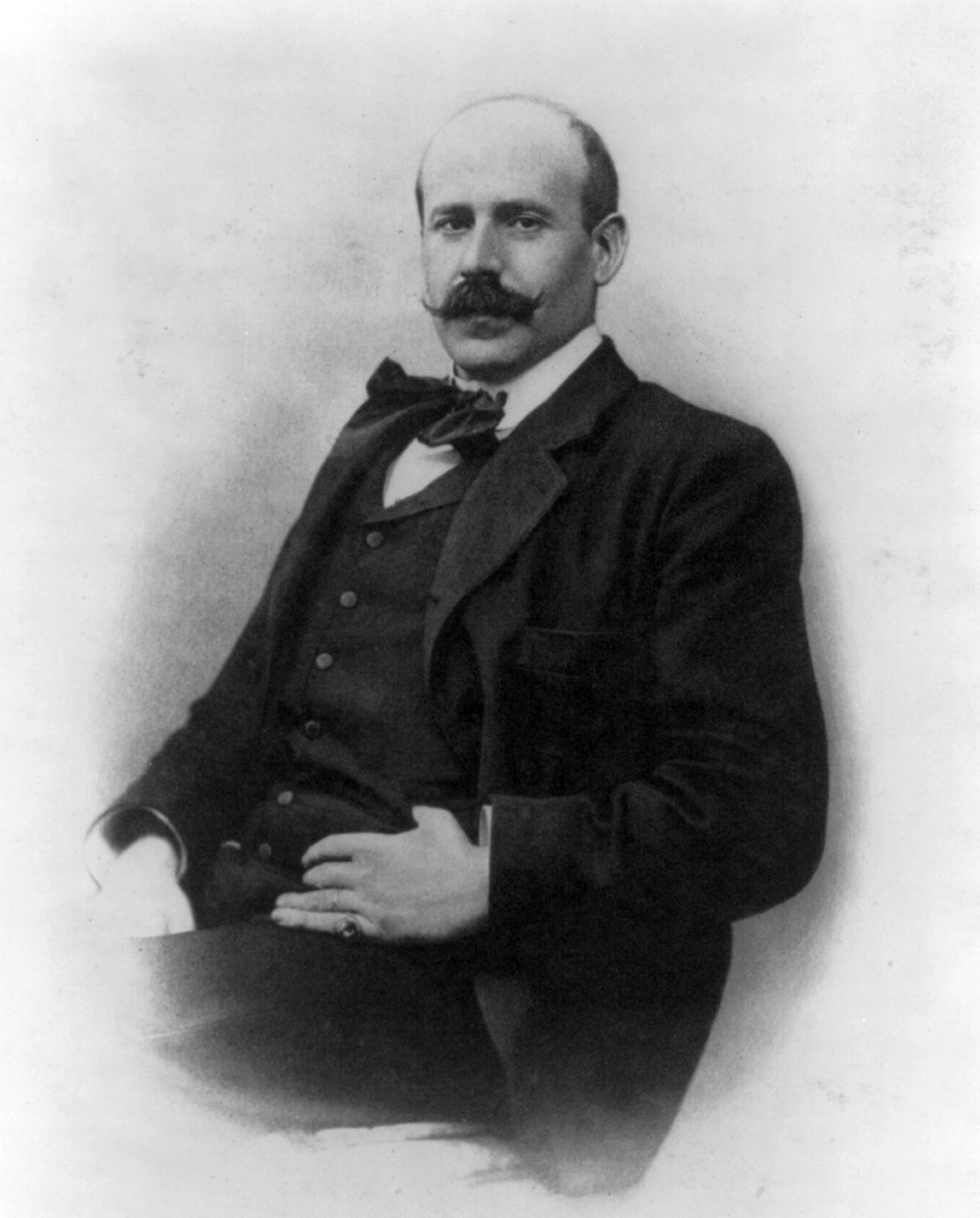
- Ignacio Zuloaga in 1909
- Born: Ignacio Zuloaga y Zabaleta; July 26, 1870; Eibar, Spain
- Died: October 31, 1945 (aged 75); Madrid, Spain
- Known for: Painting
- Relatives: Plácido Zuloaga (father), Eusebio Zuloaga (grandfather), Daniel Zuloaga (uncle)

Ignacio Zuloaga y Zabaleta (July 26, 1870 – October 31, 1945) was a Spanish painter, born in Eibar, Guipuzcoa, near the monastery of Loyola.

== Family ==
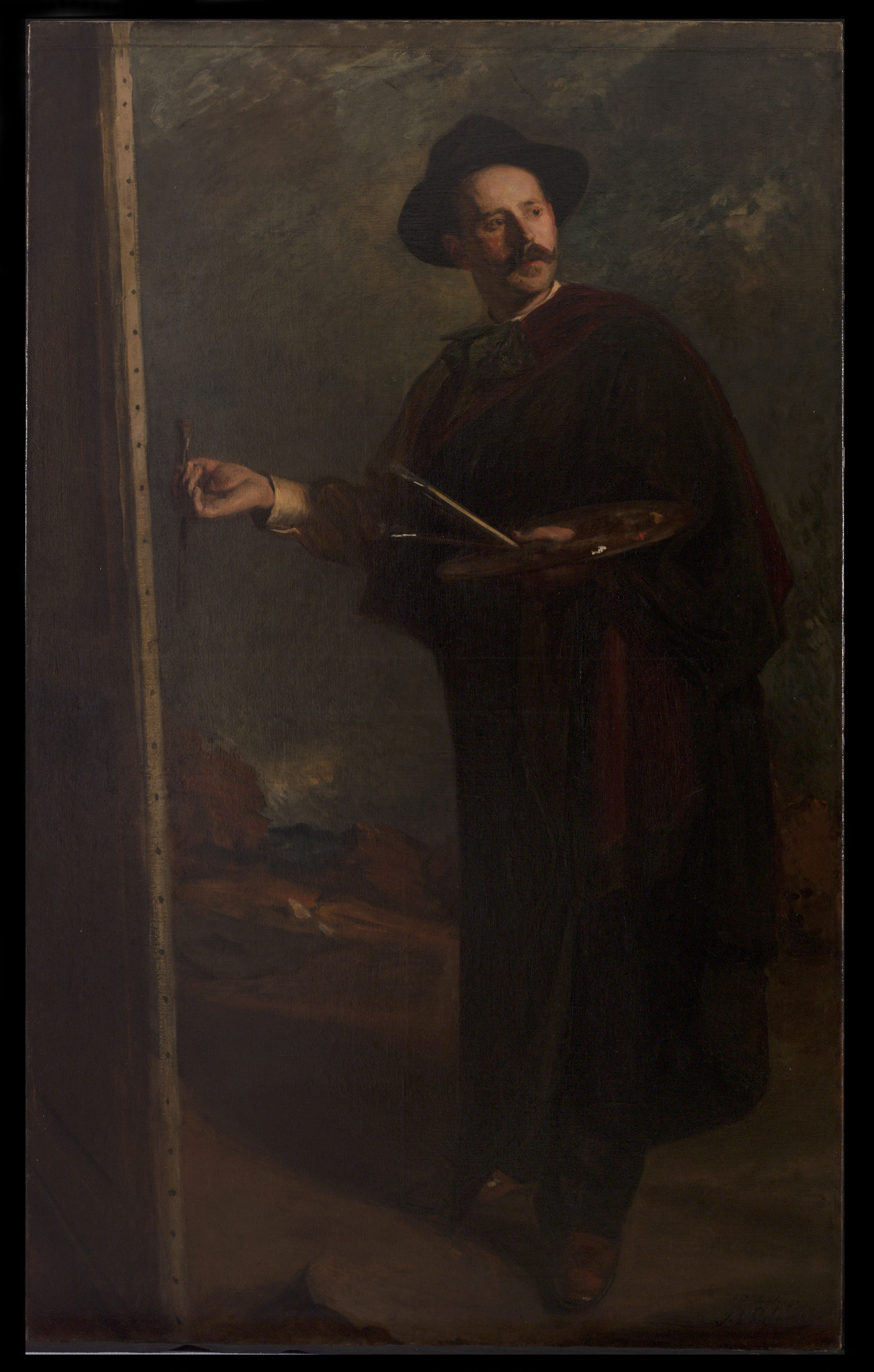
Portrait of Zuloaga by Jacques-Émile Blanche

He was the son of metalworker and damascener Plácido Zuloaga and grandson of the organizer and director of the royal armoury (Don Eusebio) in Madrid. His uncle was Daniel Zuloaga. His great-grandfather who was also the royal armourer was a friend and contemporary of Goya.

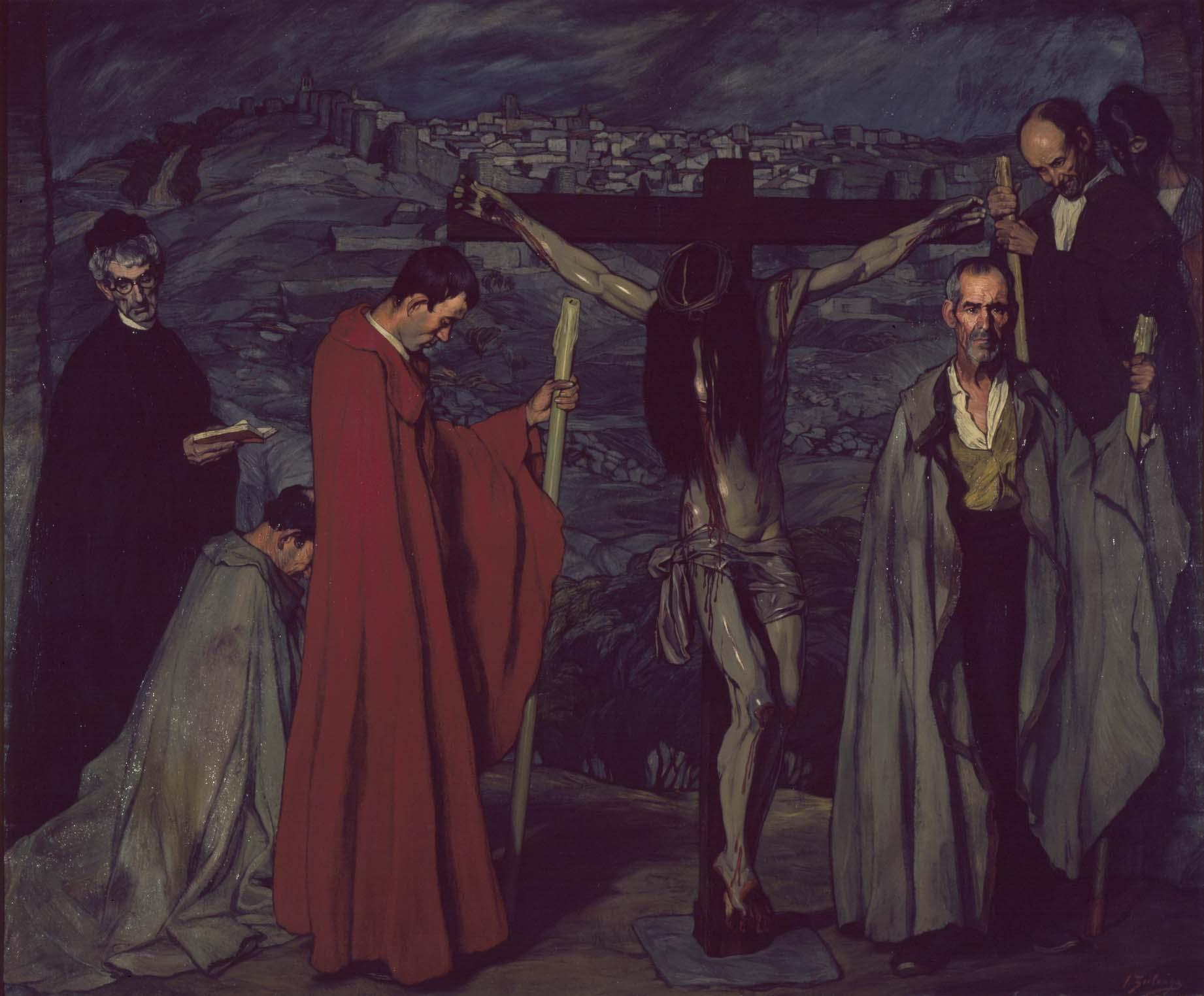
El Cristo de la Sangre (1911), Madrid, Museo Nacional Centro de Arte Reina Sofía

== Biography ==
In his youth, he drew and worked in the armourer's workshop of his father, Plácido. His father's craftmanship, a familial trade, was highly respected throughout Europe, but he intended his son for either commerce, engineering, or architecture, but during a short trip to Rome with his father, he decided to become a painter. His first painting was exhibited in Paris in 1890.

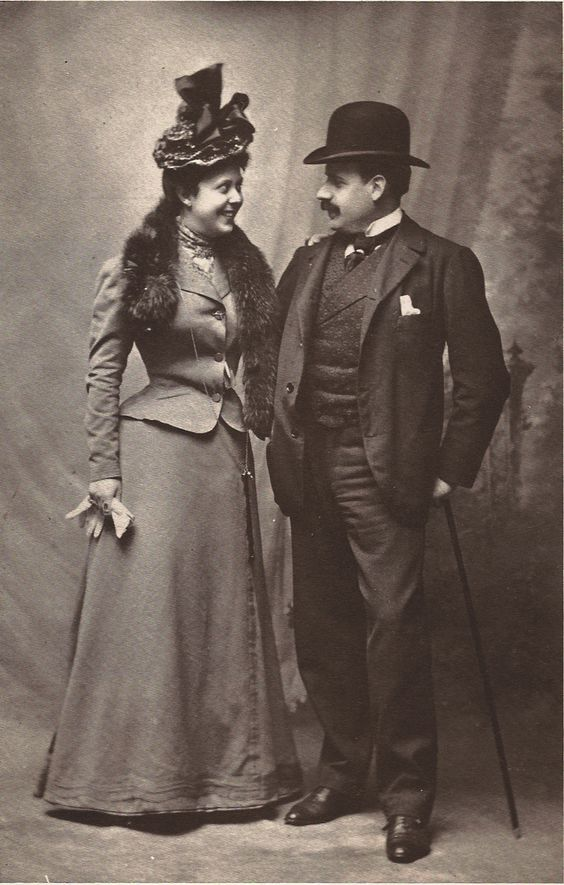
Zuloaga and his wife (c. 1900)

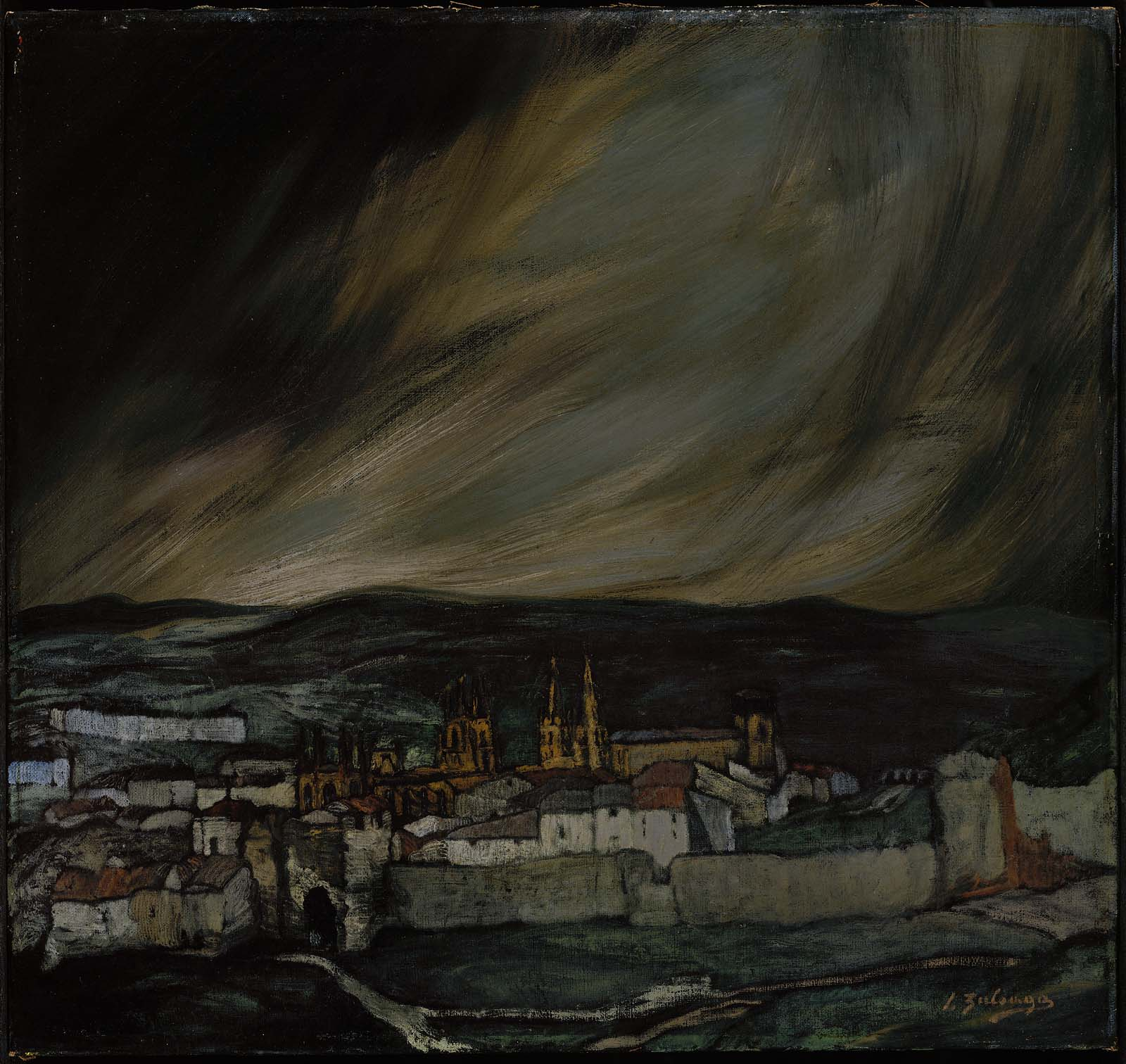
Castilian Landscape (1909), Museum of Fine Arts, Boston

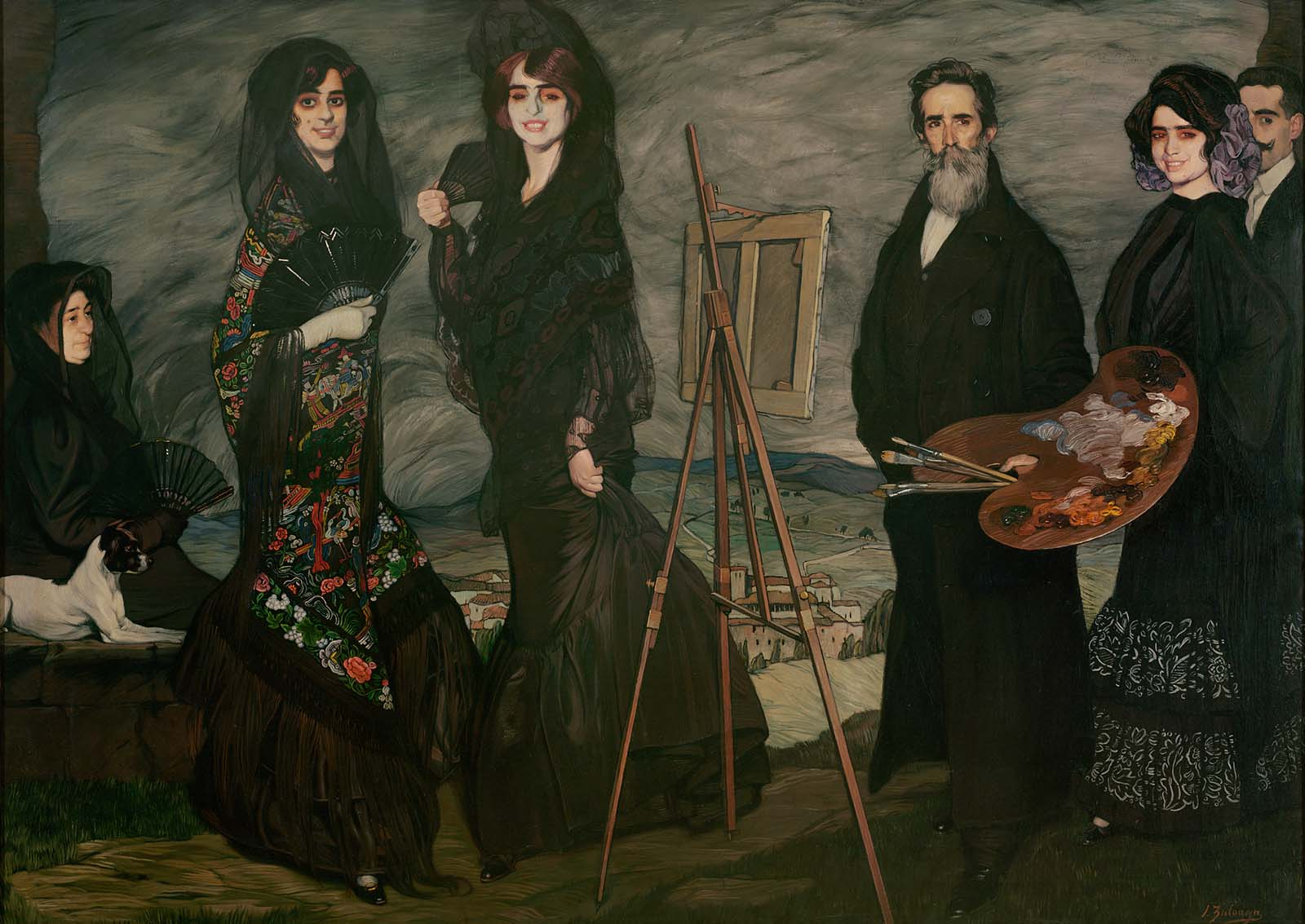
My Uncle Daniel and his Family (1910), Museum of Fine Arts, Boston

At the age of 18 he moved to Paris, settling in Montmartre, to find work and training as a painter. He was nearly destitute, and lived off some meager contributions by his mother and the benevolence of fellow Spaniards, including Paco Durrio, Pablo Uranga, and Santiago Rusiñol.

After only six months' work he completed his first picture, which was exhibited at the Paris Salon of 1890. Continuing his studies in Paris, where he lived for five years, he was in contact with post-impressionists such as Ramon Casas, Gauguin and Toulouse-Lautrec, yet his tendencies were always to a thematic that was more ethnic in scope.

He attempted to gain success during a sojourn in London; but lackluster patronage led him to return to Spain, settling in Seville, then Segovia, and developed a style based on a realist Spanish tradition, recalling Velázquez and Murillo in their earthy colouring and genre themes. He painted portraits of attired bullfighters and flamenco dancers; or portraits of family members and friends in such attire. He also painted village dwarves (El enano Gregorio el Botero; Hermitage, St Petersburg, Russia) and beggars, often as stark figures in a dreary landscape with a traditional landscape or town in the background. He also painted some village-scape scenes. He favored earth or muted tones, including maroon, black, and grey, with the exception of colorful folk attire or the bright red cassock in some paintings.

Zuloaga married Valentine Dethomas on May 18, 1899. Valentine's brother, Maxime Dethomas, was a fellow student of Zuloaga in Paris.

Zuloaga and his patrons felt slighted in 1900, when his painting Before the Bull-fight was rejected for inclusion into the Spanish representation at the Universal Exposition in Brussels. In 1899, one of his paintings exhibited in Paris had been purchased for the Luxembourg Palace. However, he did exhibit the painting at the Exposition of the Libre Esthetique in Brussels, and did see it acquired by the Modern Gallery in Brussels. He was accepted into the Venice Biennale in 1901 and 1903, and displayed 34 canvases at the Barcelona International exposition of 1907.

Among the more prominently displayed works is his Cristo de la Sangre (Christ of the Blood) or Hermandad del Cristo Crucificado (Brotherhood of the Crucified Christ), on display at the Museo Reina Sofia in Madrid. He also painted a similarly painting of individuals undergoing a traditional mortification of the flesh and a bleeding crucified Christ called The Flagellants (1900). These paintings were praised by Unamuno in his book on De Arte Pictorico as being honest representation of Spain: a Spain religious and tragic, a black Spain. rooted in the particularly Spanish Catholic fascination with mutilating penance.

Brinton in his review of an exposition in America in 1909, he states that:

It is this racy and picturesque life which Zuloaga seeks above all else to place on record, and it is these popular types unspoiled by ruthless modernism which he pursues into the farthest corners of his native land. In this zealous quest of congenial models he hesitates at nothing. He will haunt for hours a fiesta on the outskirts of some provincial town, or hasten away to the mountains, passing months at a time with smugglers and muleteers, with the superstitious fanatics of Anso in the extreme north of Aragon or with the monkish cutthroats of Las Baluecas, a little village on the southern boundary line of Salamanca.

Gil says that the faces of the old folk he paints are

severe, roughly mystical, beset by painful thoughts, shadowed by the remembrance of the glory they once were, they have sad souls, moaning under the weight of an ideal of centuries, they are not individual representations, but the synthesis of the sadness of the Spanish Soul.

One of the American collections to feature Zuloaga's work is the Johns Hopkins University's Evergreen Museum & Library, Baltimore, Maryland. Officially owned by the Evergreen House Foundation, an independent entity started by Zuloaga's great friend, philanthropist Alice Warder Garrett (1877–1952), Evergreen's works include full-length portraits of Mrs. Garrett (1915; 1928); a seated portrait of Ambassador John Work Garrett (1872–1942); a Spanish landscape; a painting based on the opera Goyescas; and a landscape of Calatayud (Spain).

An Iberia airline Airbus A340-642 aircraft, registration EC-IZY, is named after him.

== Zuloaga during and after the Spanish Civil War ==
Zuloaga was committed to the Nationalist faction during the Spanish Civil War and the Spanish State of the caudillo, Francisco Franco, whose portrait he painted in 1940. During the war, Zuloaga honored the defenders of the Siege of the Alcázar in 1936, when the building's Nationalist defenders refused to surrender despite the building being in flames. This siege, and other events such as the death of General José Moscardó Ituarte's son, served as a rallying cry for the Nationalist forces. In January 1939, this painting was hung in adjacent room displaying Picasso's modernist painting of Guernica during an exhibition of Spanish art in London. The nationalist content of his depiction of the Alcazar was allied to Zuloaga's celebration of folk traditions. Stylistically, the directness of the Siege painting also avoids modernity's challenge to realistic depictions: Fascism did not tolerate complex symbolism like that of Picasso's Guernica.

In an April 1939 letter to his patron, Mrs Garret, Zuloaga stated:

Thanks to God, and to Franco, at last the war is won and over! And over, despite the goodwill of those so-called democratic countries – what a farce, what shame, when those countries learn the truth of this drama! We all will work with all our strength to rebuild a new Spain (free, great and unified) to Spanishize Spain, and get rid of all outside influences, so that we can keep our great nature. That’s my dream in art. I hate fads (which are destructive to racial characteristics) One must (for good or bad) be oneself, and not ape the style of anyone else. I will dedicate the years that are left to me to that end. What shame there will be in the future, for those countries who inflicted crime, savage vandalism, which reigned within the soviet clan in Spain!

He was later to claim that he was aghast, as a francophile, when Hitler defeated France in 1940. After his death in 1945, he appeared on Spain's 500 peseta banknote emitted by Francoist Spain in its 1954 series, with a depiction of Toledo on the back.

Brinton in his 1909 essay was prescient of Zuloaga's future enamourment with Falangism:

He personifies in extreme form the spirit of autocracy in art, the principle of absolutism so typical of his race and country. You will meet in these bold, affirmative canvases no hint of cowardice or compromise. The work is defiant, almost despotic. It does not strive to enlist sympathy nor does it fear to be frankly antipathetic...the tones not infrequently acidulous, and the surfaces sometimes hard and metallic. Reactionary if you will...

== Gallery ==
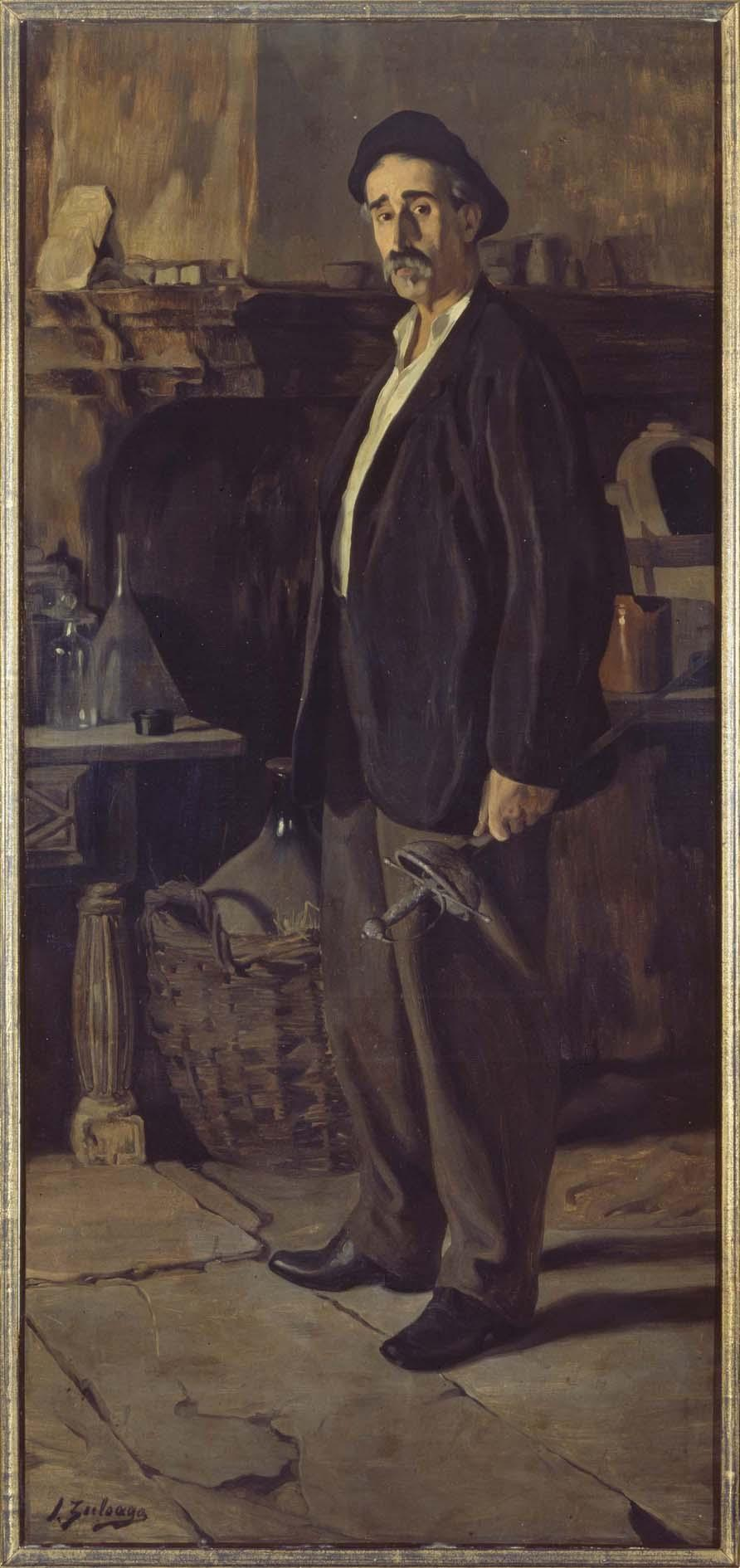
Don Plácido Zuloaga en su taller (1895), Madrid, Museo Nacional Centro de Arte Reina Sofía

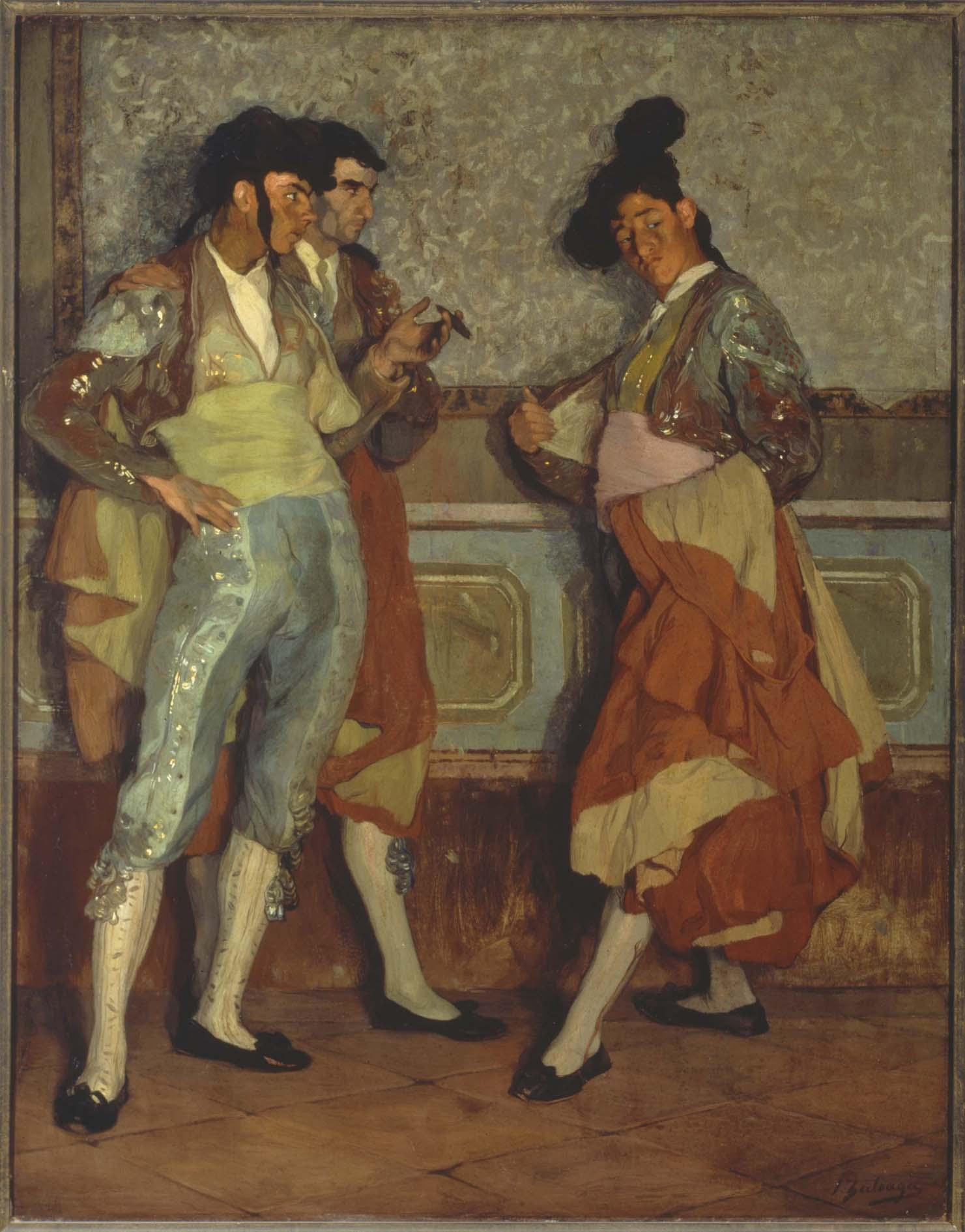
Torerillos de pueblo (1906), Madrid, Museo Nacional Centro de Arte Reina Sofía

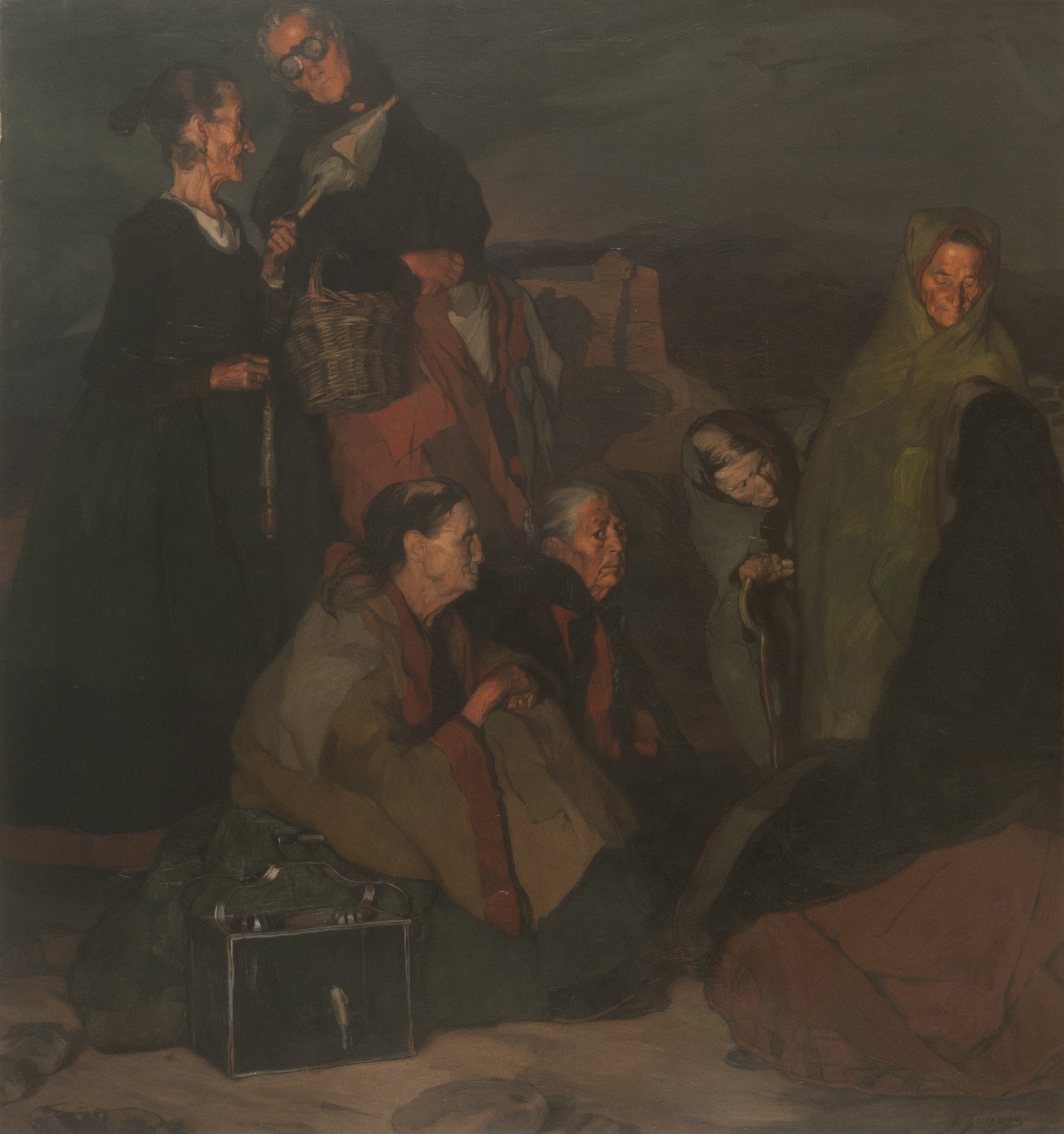
Las brujas de San Millán (1907)

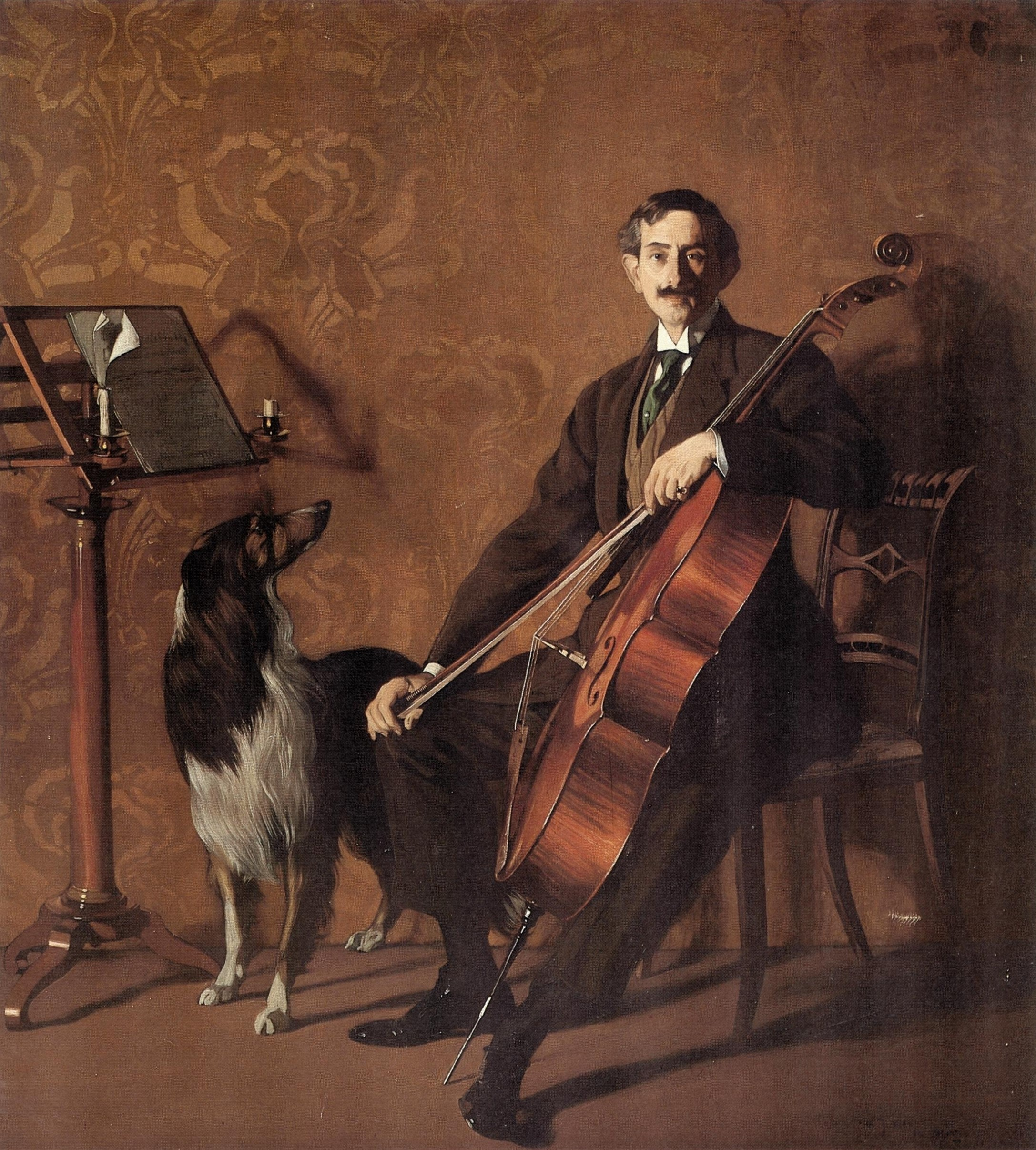
Juan de Azurmendi (1909)

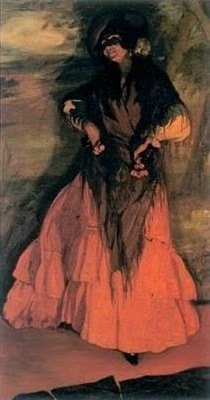
Gitanilla (after 1910)

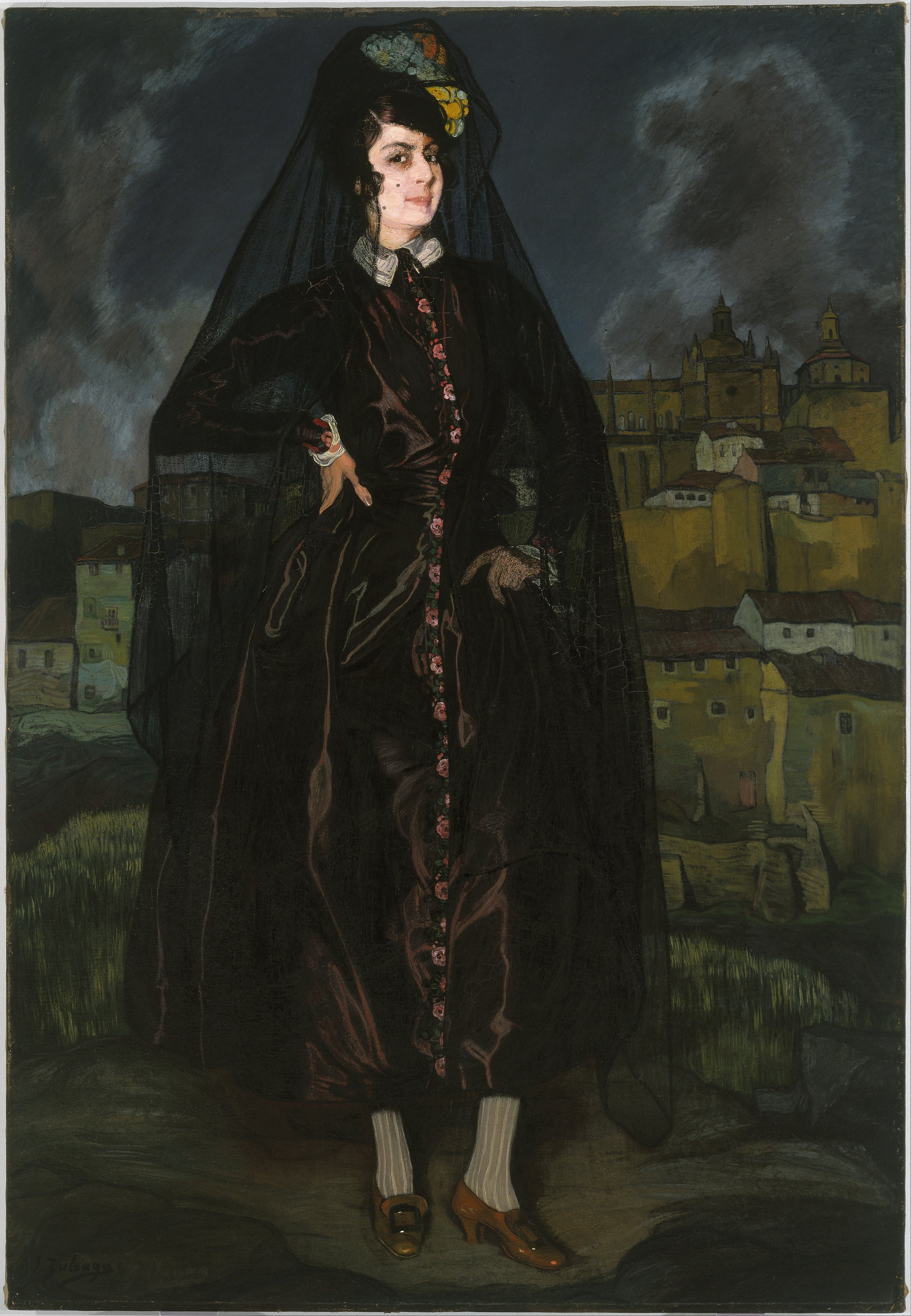
Portrait of Anita Ramírez in Black (ca. 1915), Brooklyn Museum
