= Fermín Arango =

Argentine-Spanish painter (1874–1962)

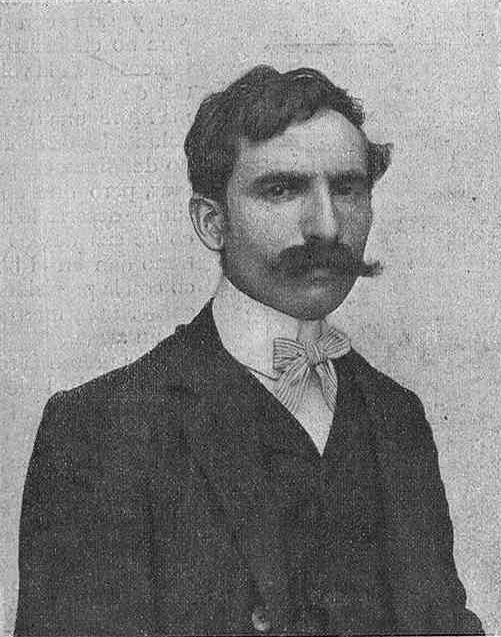
- Portrait of Fermin Arango published in La Ilustracíon Artística, 1905.
- Born: April 9, 1874; Santa Eulalia de Oscos, Asturias, Spain
- Died: October 5, 1962 (aged 88); Ham, Somme, France
- Movement: Impressionism, Symbolism (arts)
- Spouse: Géneviève Yrat Hubert

Fermín Arango Barcia (April 9, 1874 – October 5, 1962) was a Spanish-Argentine painter. He produced over sixty works in his career, which were predominantly landscapes. His work has been described as part of Impressionism and Symbolism, and was influenced by French painting.

== Biography ==
Born in the Asturian town of Santa Eulalia de Oscos, Arango emigrated to Buenos Aires with his family when he was very young. There he completed his artistic training at the Association for the Promotion of Fine Arts of Buenos Aires. He had his first exhibition there in 1904 at the Witcomb Gallery, where he displayed paintings including El embarcadero del lago, La trancera y puerto Hauret, Nocturno, Idilio, Femme, La toillete, and Paisaje del Sena. During this time, he worked as an illustrator for La Nación and Caras y Caretas (Argentina).

In 1905, he moved to Paris, France, where he was in frequent contact with Pablo Picasso, Ignacio Zuloaga, Juan Gris, Guillaume Apolinaire, and Hermenegildo Camarasa. Between 1910 and 1913, he exhibited paintings several times at the "Autumn Salon" of the Grand Palais. In 1914, his work was exhibited in the salon of La Libre Esthétique in Brussels, in honor of Darío de Regoyos, who had died the previous year. In 1919, he participated in the Exposition of Spanish Painting at the Beaux-Arts de Paris, along with works from several of the aforementioned artists.

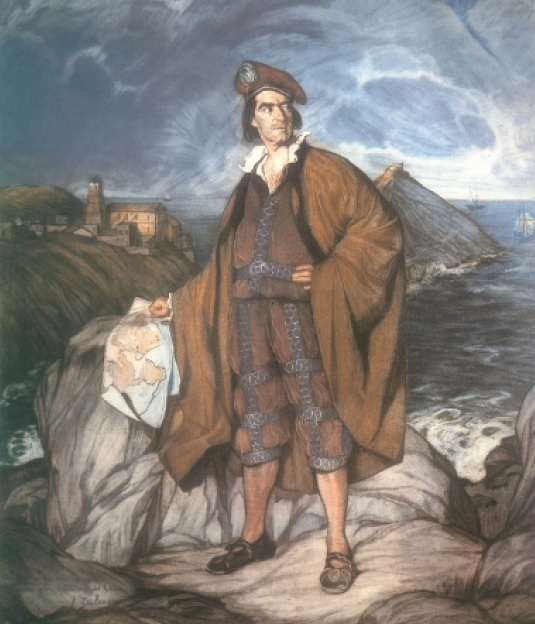
Ignacio Zuloaga's portrait of Juan Sebastián Elcano (1921–1922) was among the first Arango engraved for reproduction.

He returned to Spain periodically, including in 1914, 1919, and 1952. During this time, we was in high demand as an engraver for the creation of reproductions of oil paintings; which he did most notably for his friend, Ignacio Zuloaga as well as for the governments of Spain, the city of San Sebastian, and L'Estampe Moderne publishing house. Zuloaga rendered him in a notable portrait in 1934, which is currently on display at the Museum of Fine Arts of Asturias.

Later in life, he retreated from most of his artistic activities and retired to his house in Ham, near Paris. He died there on October 5, 1962.

== Gallery ==
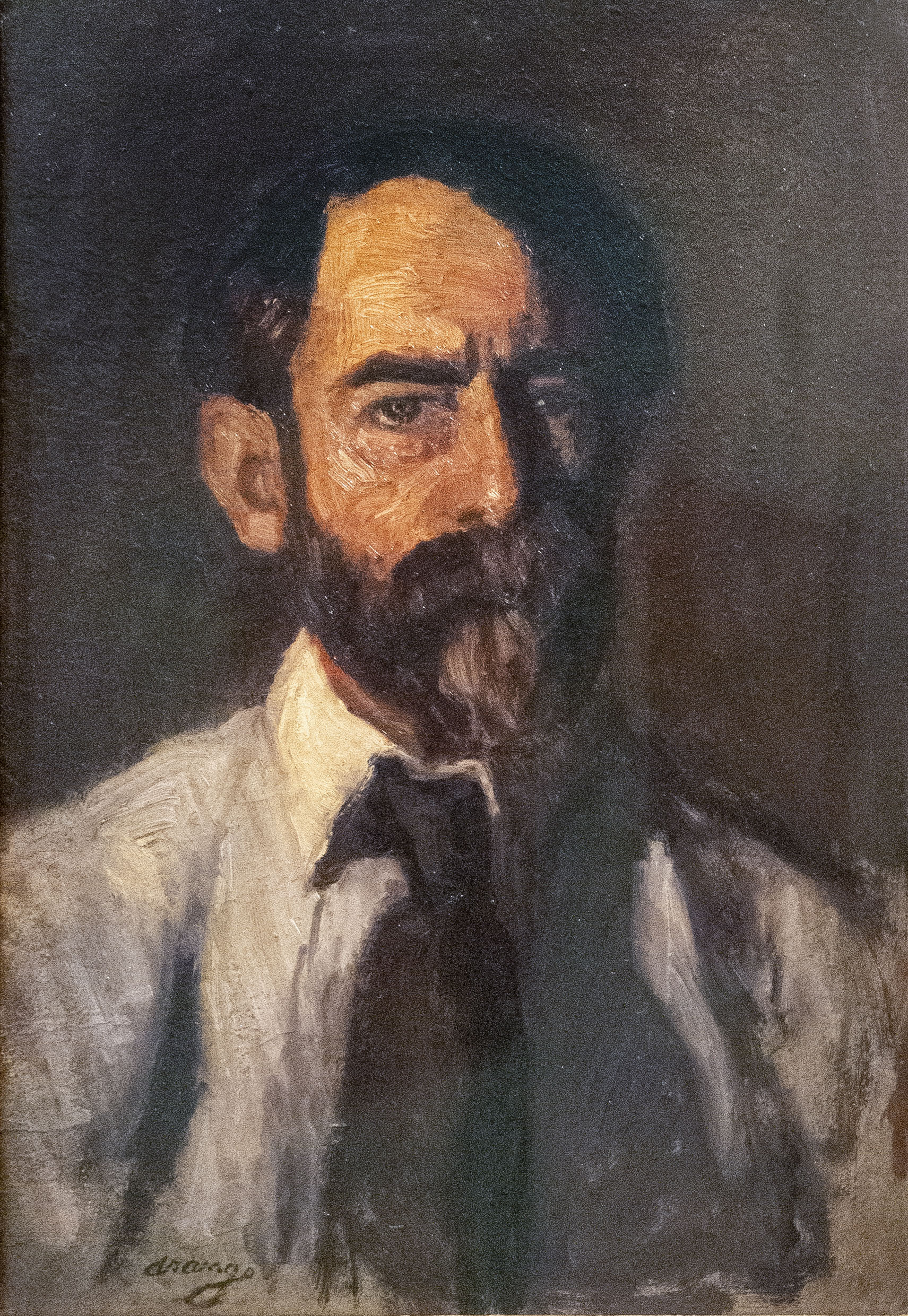
Self-Portrait by Fermin Arango (1925)

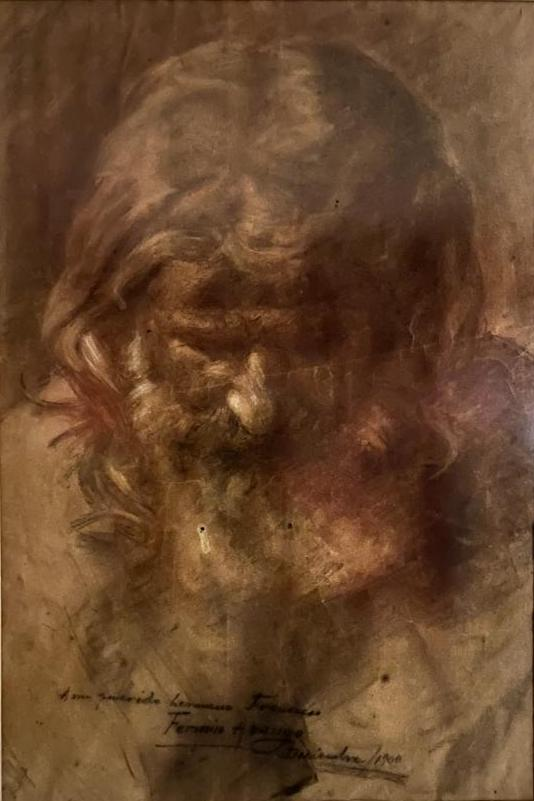
Portrait of an old man by Fermin Arango (1900). It is inscribed "to my dear brother Francisco, December 1900".

== See also ==
- While most paintings by Fermin Arango are not in the public domain, some can be viewed here.
- A portrait of Fermin Arango painting, rendered by Ignacio Zuloaga, can be viewed on the website of the Museum of Fine Arts of Asturias, here.
