= Challenge Sculpture =

1993 sculpture by Salvador Arango

Coordinates: 6.1781°N 75.6028°W

- Artist: Salvador Arango
- Year: 1993
- Type: Bronze
- Location: Itagüí

The Challenge Sculpture (Spanish: Reto) is a monument of 8 meters located in a park called The Artist in Itagüi, Colombia.

== Background ==
It was built in the period of 1991–1993 by the master Salvador Arango. It is located in a park called The Artist in Itagüi, Colombia. It is considered one of the most important sculptures of the city and of Aburrá Valley.

It was built on the initiative of the government of Itagüi as a social and cultural project for the sector. The sculpture is inspired by the challenges of humanity and the importance of giving meaning to life.

Arango has received awards from the government of Antioquia, with representative works of the city of Medellín.
