= Cristian Machín =

Uruguayan footballer (born 1988)

Cristian Adrián Machín Ramírez (born December 5, 1988) is a Uruguayan footballer who plays for Boston River in the Uruguayan Segunda División. He was born in Montevideo, Uruguay.

== Teams ==
- (Uruguay) Fénix 2006-2012
- (Argentina) Atlético Rafaela 2012–2013
- (Uruguay) Boston River 2013–present
