= Isaac Mattia =

South Sudanese footballer

Personal information
- Full name: Isaac Mattia Mokonzi
- Date of birth: 1 January 1988 (age 38)
- Position: Midfielder

Team information
- Current team: Kator FC

Senior career*
Years	Team	Apps	(Gls)
2015–	Kator FC		

International career^{‡}
2014–	South Sudan	12	(0)
- * Club domestic league appearances and goals ‡ National team caps and goals as of 20 July 2020

Isaac Mattia Mokonzi (born 1 January 1988) is a South Sudanese footballer who plays as a midfielder for Kator FC and the South Sudan national football team.

== Career ==
=== International ===
Mattia made his senior international debut on 30 May 2014, in a 0-0 draw with Mozambique during qualifying for the 2015 Africa Cup of Nations. He was included in South Sudan's squad for the 2015 CECAFA Cup, appearing in all three group stage matches against Djibouti, Sudan, and Malawi.

== Career statistics ==
=== International ===
As of matches played 10 June 2017.

National team	Year	Apps	Goals
South Sudan	2014	1	0
South Sudan	2015	8	0
South Sudan	2016	1	0
South Sudan	2017	2	0
Total		12	0
