= 1988 Greenlandic Men's Football Championship =

- Season: 1988
- Champions: Kissaviarsuk-33 (5th title)

The 1988 Greenlandic Men's Football Championship was the 18th edition of the Greenlandic Men's Football Championship. The final round was held in Aasiaat. It was won by Kissaviarsuk-33 for the fifth time in its history.

== Final round ==
=== Pool 1 ===
Pos	Team	Pld	W	D	L	GF	GA	GD	Pts	Qualification or relegation
1	Nagdlunguaq-48	3	3	0	0	9	1	+8	6	1988 Greenlandic Men's Football Championship Semi-finals
2	Nuuk IL	3	2	0	1	14	5	+9	4	1988 Greenlandic Men's Football Championship Semi-finals
3	Nagtoralik Paamiut	3	0	1	2	4	7	−3	1	
4	Sisimiut-68	3	0	1	2	1	15	−14	1	

Nuuk IL	4–3	Nagtoralik Paamiut

Aasiaat Stadium, Aasiaat

Nagdlunguaq-48	5–0	Sisimiut-68

Aasiaat Stadium, Aasiaat

Nagtoralik Paamiut	1–1	Sisimiut-68

Aasiaat Stadium, Aasiaat

Nuuk IL	1–2	Nagdlunguaq-48

Aasiaat Stadium, Aasiaat

Nagdlunguaq-48	2–0	Nagtoralik Paamiut

Aasiaat Stadium, Aasiaat

Nuuk IL	9–0	Sisimiut-68

Aasiaat Stadium, Aasiaat

=== Pool 2 ===
Pos	Team	Pld	W	D	L	GF	GA	GD	Pts	Qualification or relegation
1	Kissaviarsuk-33	3	3	0	0	14	8	+6	6	1988 Greenlandic Men's Football Championship Semi-finals
2	Ilulissat-69	3	2	0	1	7	5	+2	4	1988 Greenlandic Men's Football Championship Semi-finals
3	FC Malamuk	3	1	0	2	9	11	−2	2	
4	Tupilak-41	3	0	0	3	8	14	−6	0	

FC Malamuk	5–4	Tupilak-41

Aasiaat Stadium, Aasiaat

Kissaviarsuk-33	3–2	Ilulissat-69

Aasiaat Stadium, Aasiaat

Kissaviarsuk-33	5–3	FC Malamuk

Aasiaat Stadium, Aasiaat

Tupilak-41	1–3	Ilulissat-69

Aasiaat Stadium, Aasiaat

FC Malamuk	1–2	Ilulissat-69

Aasiaat Stadium, Aasiaat

Tupilak-41	3–6	Kissaviarsuk-33

Aasiaat Stadium, Aasiaat

== Playoffs ==
=== Semi-finals ===
Nagdlunguaq-48	3–2	Ilulissat-69

Aasiaat Stadium, Aasiaat

Kissaviarsuk-33	4–2	Nuuk IL

Aasiaat Stadium, Aasiaat

=== Third place match ===
Ilulissat-69	4–1	Nuuk IL

Aasiaat Stadium, Aasiaat

=== Final ===
Kissaviarsuk-33	2–1	Nagdlunguaq-48

Aasiaat Stadium, Aasiaat

== See also ==
- Football in Greenland
- Football Association of Greenland
- Greenland national football team
- Greenlandic Men's Football Championship
