= Joaelton =

Brazilian footballer

Personal information
- Full name: Joaelton Jonathan Sampaio
- Date of birth: 11 March 1988
- Place of birth: Indaiatuba, Brazil
- Position: Forward

Senior career*
Years	Team	Apps	(Gls)
2009	Tigres do Brasil	4	(0)
- Sousa Esporte Clube
2013	Paulista Futebol Clube	1	(0)
2013	Esporte Clube Taubaté		
2013	Real Estelí F.C.	14	(5)
2014	New Radiant S.C.		
- * Club domestic league appearances and goals

Joaelton (born 11 March 1988 in Indaiatuba, Brazil) is a Brazilian footballer who is last known to have played for New Radiant S.C. of the Maldivian Dhivehi Premier League in 2014.

== Playing career ==
While playing in Nicaragua, Joaelton reported being the victim of racist abuse from opposing club's staff and supporters.

Signed by New Radiant in the Maldives for 2014, Joaelton was involved in a serious car accident during his stay there, causing him to be incapacitated and undergo surgeries. Shortly afterwards, his agent and New Radiant decided to cancel his contract by mutual understanding.

Later in 2014, Joaelton moved to Angola where he played for Sporting Clube de Cabinda in the Girabola.
