= Irina Birvagen =

Kazakhstani footballer

Personal information
- Date of birth: 24 July 1988 (age 38)
- Position: Forward

Senior career*
| Years | Team | Apps | (Gls) |
- CSHVSM

International career^{‡}
| 2006 | Kazakhstan U19 | 3 | (0) |
| 2009–2012 | Kazakhstan | 12 | (0) |
- * Club domestic league appearances and goals ‡ National team caps and goals as of 19 September 2012

Irina Birvagen (Russian: Ирина Бирваген; born 24 July 1988) is a Kazakhstani former footballer who played as a forward. She has been a member of the Kazakhstan women's national team.
