= Jougle =

Brazilian footballer

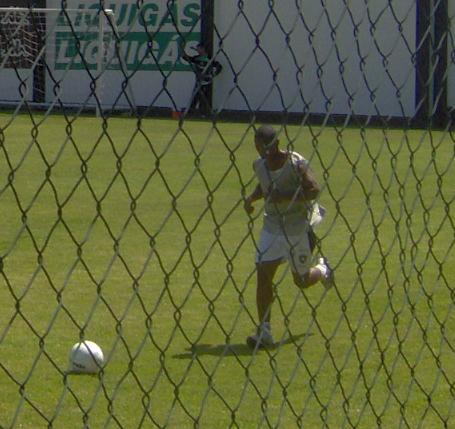

Personal information
- Full name: Jougle Manoel Rodrigues
- Date of birth: January 20, 1988 (age 38)
- Place of birth: Rio de Janeiro, Brazil
- Height: 1.66 m (5 ft 5 in)
- Position: Attacking midfielder

Youth career
- 2005–2006: Botafogo

Senior career*
Years	Team	Apps	(Gls)
2007–2010	Botafogo	3	(0)
2009	→ Botafogo-PB (loan)		
2010	→ Boavista (loan)		
2010	→ Duque de Caxias (loan)	4	(1)
2011	Duque de Caxias		
- * Club domestic league appearances and goals

Jougle Manoel Rodrigues or simply Jougle (born January 20, 1988) is a Brazilian footballer who plays as an attacking midfielder.

== Career ==
He made his professional debut with Botafogo in 6-2 away win at Nova Iguaçu on April 8, 2007 in the Rio de Janeiro State League.

== Honours ==
- Botafogo
  - Taça Rio: 2007

== Contract ==
- 2 January 2007 to 31 December 2011.
