= İsmail Baydil =

Turkish footballer

Personal information
- Full name: İsmail Baydil
- Date of birth: 26 February 1988 (age 38)
- Place of birth: Denizli, Turkey
- Position: Midfielder

Team information
- Current team: Kozanspor

Youth career
- 2002–2007: Denizlispor

Senior career*
Years	Team	Apps	(Gls)
2007–2012	Denizlispor		
2008	→ İzmirspor (loan)		
2009–2010	→ Denizli Belediyespor (loan)		
2012–2013	Denizli Belediyespor	10	(0)
2013–2014	Nazilli Belediyespor	2	(0)
2015	Kızılcabölükspor	11	(1)
2015–2016	Denizli Belediyespor	44	(3)
2017	Cizrespor	17	(0)
2017	12 Bingölspor	13	(2)
2018	Cizrespor	10	(1)
2018	Muğlaspor	10	(0)
2019–2020	Erbaaspor	34	(4)
2020–	Kozanspor	0	(0)

International career^{‡}
2009	Turkey U21	1	(0)
- * Club domestic league appearances and goals ‡ National team caps and goals as of 15 March 2020

İsmail Baydil (born 26 February 1988) is a Turkish footballer who plays for Kozanspor. He made his Süper Lig debut for Denizlispor against Galatasaray on 23 August 2008.
