= Vitali Seletskiy =

Russian footballer

Personal information
- Full name: Vitali Igorevich Seletskiy
- Date of birth: 23 April 1988 (age 38)
- Place of birth: Chita, Russian SFSR
- Height: 1.68 m (5 ft 6 in)
- Position: Midfielder

Team information
- Current team: FC Irkutsk (assistant coach)

Senior career*
Years	Team	Apps	(Gls)
2006	FC Chita	1	(0)
2008–2013	FC Chita	100	(5)
2013–2016	FC Baikal Irkutsk	64	(2)
2016–2018	FC Zenit Irkutsk	48	(2)
2019	FC Chita	6	(0)

Managerial career
- 2023–: FC Irkutsk (assistant)
- * Club domestic league appearances and goals

Vitali Igorevich Seletskiy (Russian: Виталий Игоревич Селецкий; born 23 April 1988) is a Russian professional football coach and a former player. He is an assistant coach with FC Irkutsk.

== Club career ==
He played two seasons in the Russian Football National League for FC Chita and FC Baikal Irkutsk.
