= Sergei Yuvenko =

Russian footballer

Personal information
- Full name: Sergei Sergeyevich Yuvenko
- Date of birth: 4 February 1988 (age 38)
- Height: 1.85 m (6 ft 1 in)
- Position: Striker

Senior career*
Years	Team	Apps	(Gls)
2006–2009	FC Mordovia Saransk	48	(9)
2010–2011	FC Biokhimik Saransk		
2017	FC Saransk		
2018–2019	FC Lada Dimitrovgrad (amateur)		
2019–2020	FC Dorozhnik Kamenka		
- * Club domestic league appearances and goals

Sergei Sergeyevich Yuvenko (Russian: Серге́й Серге́евич Ювенко; born 4 February 1988) is a Russian former professional football player.

== Club career ==
He played in the Russian Football National League for FC Mordovia Saransk in 2007.
