= Sascha Imholz =

Swiss footballer (born 1988)

Personal information
- Date of birth: 15 November 1988 (age 37)
- Place of birth: Altdorf, Switzerland
- Height: 1.80 m (5 ft 11 in)
- Position: Midfielder

Team information
- Current team: FC Sursee (Manager)

Youth career
- 2001–2006: FC Luzern

Senior career*
Years	Team	Apps	(Gls)
2006–2010	FC Luzern	13	(0)
2010–2012	SC Kriens	60	(0)
2012–2020	FC Gunzwil		

Managerial career
- 2013–2020: FC Gunzwil (player-manager)
- 2020–2023: FC Hergiswil
- 2023–: FC Sursee
- * Club domestic league appearances and goals

Sascha Imholz (born 15 November 1988) is a retired Swiss football midfielder and current manager of Swiss club FC Sursee.

== Coaching career ==
After a year as a player at FC Gunzwil, Imholz took over as player-manager starting from the 2013–14 season, where, in his first season, he led the club to an impressive second place finish in the 2. Liga Interregional. His tenure met with mixed success, but along the way, it also resulted in several contract extensions. In January 2020, it was announced that Imholz would leave the club after eight years at the end of the season.

Just three months later, in April 2020, it was revealed that Imholz would take charge of FC Hergiswil starting from the 2020–21 season. On 30 May 2023, it was confirmed that Imholz had been sacked after the team found itself in relegation trouble.

On 27 June 2023, Imholz was announced as new manager of FC Sursee.
