= Oleg Sibalov =

Russian footballer

Personal information
- Full name: Oleg Vladimirovich Sibalov
- Date of birth: 11 April 1988 (age 38)
- Height: 1.75 m (5 ft 9 in)
- Position: Forward

Senior career*
Years	Team	Apps	(Gls)
2005–2009	FC Amur Blagoveshchensk	42	(7)
2010	FC Amur-2010 Blagoveshchensk (amateur)		
2011–2012	FC Amur-2010 Blagoveshchensk	19	(1)
2013	FC Blagoveshchensk		
2014	FC DSI Komsomolsk-na-Amure		
2015–2020	FC Blagoveshchensk		
- * Club domestic league appearances and goals

Oleg Vladimirovich Sibalov (Russian: Олег Владимирович Сибалов; born 11 April 1988) is a Russian former professional football player.

== Club career ==
He played in the Russian Football National League for FC Amur Blagoveshchensk in 2005.
