= Martín Castillo (footballer) =

Mexican footballer (born 1988)

Personal information
- Full name: Martín Jesús Castillo Sánchez
- Date of birth: 9 June 1988 (age 38)
- Place of birth: Salamanca, Guanajuato, Mexico
- Height: 1.64 m (5 ft 5 in)
- Position: Defender

Senior career*
Years	Team	Apps	(Gls)
2009–2012	Reboceritos de La Piedad	28	(0)
2013–2017	Alebrijes	59	(1)
2017–2018	Correcaminos	0	(0)
Total		87	(1)
- * Club domestic league appearances and goals

Martín Jesús Castillo Sánchez (born 9 June 1988) is a Mexican former professional footballer, who played for clubs including Correcaminos of Ascenso MX.
