= Marco Gasparri =

Italian footballer

Personal information
- Date of birth: 13 October 1988 (age 38)
- Place of birth: Tradate, Italy
- Height: 1.85 m (6 ft 1 in)
- Position: Midfielder

Team information
- Current team: Varesina

Youth career
- 2004–2006: Como

Senior career*
Years	Team	Apps	(Gls)
2006–2008	Como	19	(1)
2008–2009	Borgomanero	27	(6)
2009–2013	Verbano	133	(53)
2013–2015	Borgosesia	69	(29)
2015–2016	Seregno	36	(9)
2016–2017	Monza	38	(3)
2018–2019	Chieri	52	(18)
2019–2022	Legnano	101	(34)
2022–	Varesina	52	(18)
- * Club domestic league appearances and goals as of 20 December 2023

Marco Gasparri (born 13 October 1988) is an Italian professional football player who plays for Serie D club Varesina.

== Honours ==
=== Club ===
Monza

- Serie D: 2016-17
- Scudetto Dilettanti: 2016-17
