= Bohdan Karkovskyi =

Ukrainian footballer

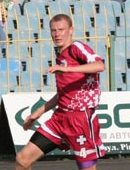

Personal information
- Full name: Bohdan Mykhaylovych Karkovskyi
- Date of birth: 29 January 1988 (age 38)
- Place of birth: Lviv Oblast, Ukrainian SSR
- Height: 1.89 m (6 ft 2 1/2 in)
- Positions: Defender; midfielder

Youth career
- 2004: Youth Sportive School #4 Lviv

Senior career*
Years	Team	Apps	(Gls)
2005–2007	Rava Rava-Ruska	9	(0)
2008–2011	Volyn Lutsk	69	(6)
2014	Volyn Lutsk	0	(0)
2014–2016	Piast Tuczempy		
2017–2021	Hirnyk Novoyavorivsk (amateurs)		
- * Club domestic league appearances and goals

Bohdan Karkovskyi (Ukrainian: Богдан Михайлович Карковський; born 29 January 1988) is a Ukrainian former professional footballer who played as a defender.

He made his debut for Volyn Lutsk as a substitute in a game against Lviv on 18 March 2008 in the Ukrainian First League. Karkovskyi for a long time did not play due to injuries.
