= Salvador Arango =

Colombian sculptor

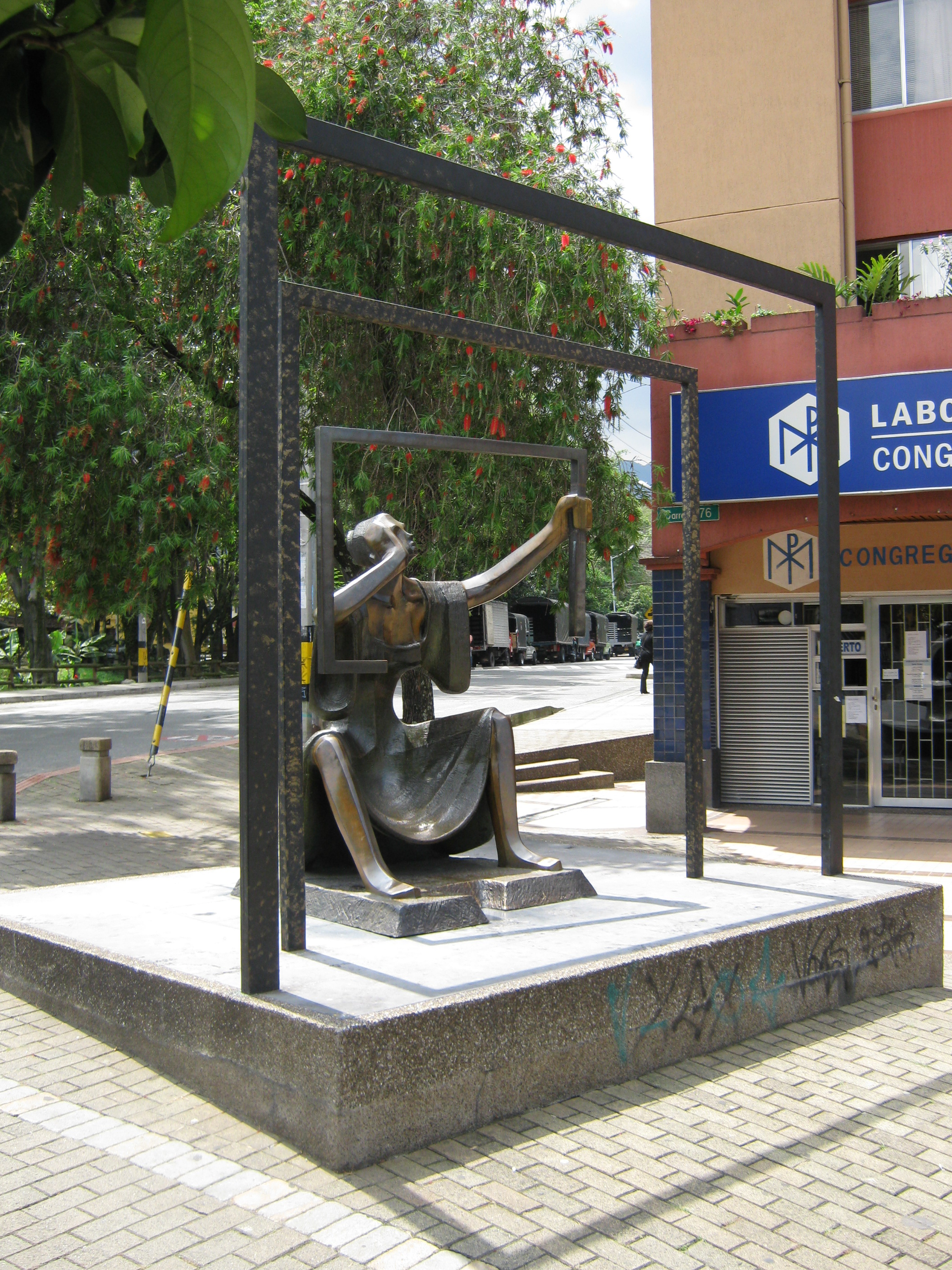
- The Lady of the Mirror, located in Bogotá.
- Born: 16 March 1944 (age 81); Itagüí, Antioquia
- Known for: Sculptor

Salvador Arango is a Colombian sculptor, born in Itagüi, Colombia in 1944. He is known as "SAAR".

== Career ==
In 1976, Arango attended the Ninth International Sculpture Conference in New Orleans on behalf of Colombia, and was invited by the University of Pennsylvania.

== Recognition ==
In 1978, documentary films of Bogotá performed "Bootstrap," a 15-minute film on his life and work. The film was screened across the country, led by Leopoldo Pinzon.

In 1990 he was invited by International Art Connection to represent Colombia in a major exhibition of visual arts International Des Createurs Laura La Chapelle de la Sorbonne in Paris.

== Works ==
- The Beetle
- A New Beginning
- The Thinker
- The Lady of the Harp
- The Lady of Justice
- The Lady of the Mirror
- The Challenge

== See also ==
- Museum of Antioquia
