= Soheil Rahmani =

Iranian footballer (born 1988)

Personal information
- Full name: Soheil Rahmani
- Date of birth: 20 November 1988 (age 37)
- Place of birth: Fuman, Iran
- Positions: Left winger; left back

Youth career
- Malavan

Senior career*
Years	Team	Apps	(Gls)
2010–2015	Malavan	35	(3)
2015–2018	Nassaji	?	(?)
2018–2019	Baadraan	?	(?)
- * Club domestic league appearances and goals as of 29 August 2012 (UTC)

Soheil Rahmani (Persian: سهیل رحمانی) is an Iranian footballer who plays for Baadraan in the Azadegan League.

== Club career ==
Rahmani played his entire career in Malavan. In July 2012 Malavan put him in transfer list. He participate in Malavan's rival, Damash pre-season trainings. After passing the technical tests, Malavan didn't let him to join Damash. So he remain in Bandar-e Anzali for his contract's last year.

=== Statistics ===
As of 29 August 2012

Club performance			League		Cup		Continental		Total	
Season	Club	League	Apps	Goals	Apps	Goals	Apps	Goals	Apps	Goals
Iran			League		Hazfi Cup		Asia		Total	
2010–11	Malavan	Pro League	11	0			–			
2011–12	Malavan	Pro League	3	0			–			
2012–13	Malavan	Pro League	2	0	0	0	–		2	0
Career total			16	0			0	0		
