= Fred Santana =

Brazilian footballer (born 1988)

Personal information
- Full name: Frederico Neves Souza Santana
- Date of birth: 12 April 1988 (age 38)
- Place of birth: São Paulo, Brazil
- Height: 1.83 m (6 ft 0 in)
- Position: Forward

Team information
- Current team: Tourizense

Senior career*
Years	Team	Apps	(Gls)
2011	Itapipoca	10	(3)
2011	Taubaté		
2012–2013	Atlético El Vigía	10	(1)
2014	Taboão da Serra		
2014	Ferroviário		
2015	Formosa		
2015–2016	Oliveira do Hospital	27	(11)
2016	Anadia	3	(0)
2017–	Tourizense	7	(0)
- * Club domestic league appearances and goals as of 2 April 2017

Frederico Neves Souza Santana, known as Fred Santana (born 12 April 1988) is a Brazilian football player who plays for Tourizense.

== Club career ==
He made his professional debut in the Venezuelan Primera División for Atlético El Vigía on 20 January 2013 in a game against Aragua.
