= Linda Bengtsson =

Swedish football defender

Personal information
- Date of birth: 12 February 1988 (age 38)
- Position: Defender

Youth career
- Vimmerby IF

Senior career*
Years	Team	Apps	(Gls)
2010–2011	Hammarby	9	(0)
2011–2012	Rågsved	20	(3)
2014	Djurgården	18	(0)
- * Club domestic league appearances and goals

Linda Bengtsson (born 12 February 1988) is a Swedish football defender who currently plays for Djurgårdens IF. She has played Damallsvenskan football for Hammarby IF.

== Career ==
Bengtsson started her career in Vimmerby IF. During the 2010 and 2011 season, she played for Damallsvenskan side Hammarby IF, where she made a total of nine appearances.
