= Anastasios Christofileas =

Greek footballer (born 1988)

Personal information
- Full name: Anastasios Christofileas
- Date of birth: 21 December 1988 (age 37)
- Place of birth: Athens, Greece
- Height: 1.82 m (6 ft 0 in)
- Position: Centre-back

Youth career
- Palliniakos

Senior career*
Years	Team	Apps	(Gls)
2007–2009	Aittitos Spata		
2009–2010	Keravnos Keratea		
2010–2011	Diagoras	17	(0)
2011–2012	Vyzas Megara	26	(1)
2012–2014	Kallithea	36	(0)
2014–2015	Kalamata		
2015–2017	Acharnaikos	32	(1)
2017	Lamia	9	(0)
2017–2019	Aittitos Spata		
2019	Ethnikos Piraeus		
2019	A.E. Kifisia		
2020–	Kalamata	5	(0)
- * Club domestic league appearances and goals as of 9 February 2020

Anastasios Christofileas (Greek: Αναστάσιος Χριστοφιλέας; born 21 December 1988) is a Greek professional footballer who plays as a centre-back.
