= José Márquez (footballer, born 1988) =

Guatemalan footballer

Personal information
- Full name: José Alberto Márquez Àrdan
- Date of birth: 6 August 1988 (age 38)
- Place of birth: San Benito, Guatemala
- Height: 1.79 m (5 ft 10 in)
- Position: Defensive midfielder

Senior career*
Years	Team	Apps	(Gls)
2016–2023	Guastatoya	256	(11)

International career
2018-	Guatemala	6	(1)
- * Club domestic league appearances and goals as of 00:15, 8 November 2024 (UTC)

José Alberto Márquez Àrdan (born 6 August 1988) is a Guatemalan former professional footballer who played as a midfielder.

== Personal life ==
He is from San Benito, Petén and has the nickname "la Toña". Marquez suffered the loss of his mother, Tere Ardón, who died in August 2021.

== Career ==
Marquez courted controversy in 2018 when Antigua GFC announced his signing on their website when his current team Guastatoya said he was still under contract. Ultimately, Marquez stayed with Guastatoya and signed a new 2-year contract with the club. He was a member of the Guastatoya side that won the Guatemalan title in 2018.

== International career ==
He made his debut for the full Guatemalan team against Cuba on the 16 August 2018. He scored the opening goal of the game on his debut in a match Guatemala won 3–0. He was in the Guatemalan squad that competed at the 2021 CONCACAF Gold Cup.

== Honours ==
Guastatoya

- Liga Nacional de Guatemala: Clausura 2018, Apertura 2018, Apertura 2020
