= Alex Porfirio =

Brazilian footballer (born 1988)

Personal information
- Full name: Alex Porfirio de Lima
- Date of birth: 29 May 1988 (age 38)
- Place of birth: Alvorada, Brazil
- Height: 1.88 m (6 ft 2 in)
- Position: Forward

Team information
- Current team: Velo Clube

Senior career*
Years	Team	Apps	(Gls)
2008–2011	São Carlos		
2011	→ BATE Borisov (loan)	11	(0)
2012	Velo Clube		
2013	Taubaté		
2014	Inter de Limeira		
- * Club domestic league appearances and goals as of 20 December 2011

Alex Porfirio de Lima (born 29 May 1988, in Alvorada) is a Brazilian former footballer.

== Career ==
In 2012 he played for Velo Clube in Campeonato Paulista Série A2.
