= Andri Abubakar =

Indonesian footballer

Personal information
- Full name: Andri Abubakar
- Date of birth: 7 November 1988 (age 38)
- Place of birth: Ternate, Indonesia
- Height: 1.69 m (5 ft 7 in)
- Position: Winger

Senior career*
Years	Team	Apps	(Gls)
2007–2010	Persigo Gorontalo	66	(14)
2011–2012	PSMS Medan	20	(2)
2013–2015	PSPS Pekanbaru	10	(4)
2016–2017	Persiter Ternate	0	(0)
2018	PSPS Riau	12	(4)
2018–2020	Persiraja Banda Aceh	40	(11)
2021	PSPS Riau	8	(2)
2022–2023	Tiga Naga	2	(0)
- * Club domestic league appearances and goals

Andri Abubakar (born 7 November 1988) is an Indonesian former footballer who plays as a winger.

== Club career ==
=== PSPS Riau ===
He was signed for PSPS Riau to play in Liga 2 in the 2018 season.

=== Persiraja Banda Aceh ===
He was signed for Persiraja Banda Aceh to play in the middle season of Liga 2 in 2018.

=== Return to PSPS Riau ===
On 18 August 2021, Andri signed a contract with Indonesian Liga 2 club PSPS Riau. He made his league debut on 6 October against Semen Padang at the Gelora Sriwijaya Stadium, Palembang.

== Honours ==
=== Club ===
Persiraja Banda Aceh

- Liga 2 third place (play-offs): 2019
