= Laura Chomiuk =

American radio astronomer and astrophysicist

Laura Beth Chomiuk is an American radio astronomer and astrophysicist whose research involves the study of stellar evolution, stellar explosions (especially novae), and the effects of ejected material from stellar explosions on subsequent stellar evolution, as well as building a detailed radio map of the Andromeda Galaxy. She is a professor in the Department of Physics & Astronomy at Michigan State University.

== Education and career ==
Chomiuk grew up in Detroit, and was inspired to study astronomy through seeing the 1997 film Contact. She became an undergraduate at Wesleyan University, where she graduated with high honors in astronomy in 2003. She continued her studies at the University of Wisconsin–Madison. There, she received a master's degree in atmospheric and oceanic sciences in 2006, and completed a Ph.D. in 2010. Her dissertation, Supernova remnants across the Hubble Sequence, was supervised by Eric Wilcots.

After postdoctoral research from 2010 to 2013 as a Jansky Fellow at the National Radio Astronomy Observatory, the Harvard–Smithsonian Center for Astrophysics, and Michigan State University, she joined Michigan State University as an assistant professor in 2013. At Michigan State, she has founded multiple programs providing astronomy research opportunities to undergraduates, and hosts outreach events for the public to attend observations. She was promoted to associate professor in 2018 and full professor in 2023.

== Recognition ==
Chomiuk was a 2025 recipient of the Presidential Early Career Award for Scientists and Engineers.

== Personal life ==
In 2020, Chomiuk was diagnosed as having stage IV cancer.
