= Enoch Oteng =

Belgian footballer

Personal information
- Date of birth: 8 July 1988 (age 38)
- Place of birth: Brussels, Belgium
- Height: 1.69 m (5 ft 7 in)
- Position: Defensive midfielder

Team information
- Current team: Cappellen FC
- Number: 6

Youth career
- 1998–2006: VAV Beerschot

Senior career*
Years	Team	Apps	(Gls)
2006–2007	Germinal Beerschot	18	(2)
2007–2008	Verbroedering Geel	3	(0)
2009	Larissa	0	(0)
2009–2010	VC Herentals	15	(1)
2010–2011	VV Axel		
2011–2014	K. Merksem SC		
2014–2015	K. Lyra	8	(0)
2015–	Cappellen FC	26	(0)
- * Club domestic league appearances and goals

Enoch Oteng (born 8 July 1988 in Brussels) is a Belgian footballer, who currently plays for Cappellen FC. He is of Ghanaian descent.

== Career ==
Oteng began his career 1998 with VAV Beerschot. After merger named: Germinal Beerschot. He served Germinal Beerschot in the Jupiler League for one year and joined Verbroedering Geel in July 2007. He was released by his club in January 2009 and joined to Greek side AE Larissa. After he plays with V.C. Herentals the season 2009–2010. At the end he quit there and go plays for fun in an Antwerp pubteam. He joined than in summer 2010 to Dutch side VV Axel., before in Juni 2011 returned to Belgium and signed for K. Merksem SC.

== Personal life ==
Oteng is of Ghanaian descent and his parents are Belgian immigrants from Accra.
