= Faber Cañaveral =

Colombian footballer (born 1988)

Personal information
- Full name: Faber Cañaveral Rentería
- Date of birth: 31 August 1988 (age 38)
- Place of birth: Cali, Colombia
- Height: 1.76 m (5 ft 9 in)
- Position: Midfielder

Team information
- Current team: Santa Rita

Senior career*
Years	Team	Apps	(Gls)
2007–2008	Córdoba		
2009–2010	Atlético de la Sabana		
2011	Deportivo Cali		
2012	Millonarios		
2013	América de Cali	28	(1)
2014	Uniautónoma	27	(1)
2015	Envigado	33	(5)
2016	Atlético Bucaramanga	18	(2)
2016–2017	Atlético Junior	14	(0)
2017–2018	Once Caldas	23	(0)
2018–2019	Correcaminos UAT	6	(0)
2020–	Santa Rita		
- * Club domestic league appearances and goals as of 15 September 2019

Faber Cañaveral Rentería (born August 31, 1988) is a Colombian professional footballer who plays as a midfielder for Santa Rita.
