= Andreas Niederquell =

German footballer

Personal information
- Full name: Andreas Niederquell
- Date of birth: 18 November 1988 (age 37)
- Place of birth: Borisoyskoe, Soviet Union
- Height: 1.78 m (5 ft 10 in)
- Position: Midfielder

Youth career
- –2004: SV Gendorf Burgkirchen
- 2004–2007: Wacker Burghausen

Senior career*
Years	Team	Apps	(Gls)
2007–2009	Wacker Burghausen II	27	(2)
2007–2010	Wacker Burghausen	18	(0)
2010–2011	TSV Ampfing	20	(0)
2011–2013	Wacker Burghausen II	50	(8)
2013–2015	FC Töging	33	(6)
2014	FC Töging II	2	(0)
2016–2017	SV Gendorf Burgkirchen	18	(3)
- * Club domestic league appearances and goals

Andreas Niederquell (born 18 November 1988) is a German former footballer who played as a midfielder.

== Career ==
Niederquell made his professional debut for Wacker Burghausen in the 3. Liga on 25 July 2009, starting the match against Borussia Dortmund II, which finished as a 4–3 home win.
