= Diego Basto =

Colombian footballer (born 1988)

Personal information
- Full name: Diego Armando Basto Rengifo
- Date of birth: January 1, 1988 (age 38)
- Place of birth: Bogotá, Colombia
- Height: 1.79 m (5 ft 10 in)
- Position: Midfielder

Team information
- Current team: Llaneros

Youth career
- Millonarios

Senior career*
Years	Team	Apps	(Gls)
2007–2008	Millonarios	1	(0)
2008	Patriotas		
2009–2010	Cúcuta Deportivo		
2011	Fortaleza	4	(0)
2012	Real Cartagena		
2012–2013	Llaneros	14	(0)
- * Club domestic league appearances and goals as of 17 September 2012

Diego Armando Basto Rengifo (born 1 January 1988) is a Colombian football midfielder, who plays for Llaneros in Categoría Primera B. He previously played for Millonarios in the Copa Mustang.

== Honours ==
América de Cali

- Categoría Primera B (1): 2016.
