= 1988 Campeonato da 1ª Divisão do Futebol =

Campeonato da 1ª Divisão do Futebol
- Season: 1988
- Champions: Wa Seng

Statistics of Campeonato da 1ª Divisão do Futebol in the 1988 season.

== Overview ==
Wa Seng won the championship.
