= Crispin Olando =

Kenyan international footballer (born 1988)

Personal information
- Full name: Crispin Olando
- Date of birth: 3 January 1988 (age 38)
- Place of birth: Kenya
- Position: Midfielder

Senior career*
Years	Team	Apps	(Gls)
–2010	Thika United F.C.		
2010–2013	Tusker F.C.		

International career^{‡}
2011–	Kenya	1	(0)
- * Club domestic league appearances and goals as of 23 January 2013 ‡ National team caps and goals as of 23 January 2013

Crispin Olando (born 3 January 1988) is a Kenyan international footballer who plays professionally as a midfielder.

== Club career ==
Olando has played his entire career in the Kenyan Premier League, starting with Thika United FC in 2006 before moving to Tusker FC in 2010.

== International career ==
Olando was a member of the Kenya national under-20 football team.

Olando was first called up to the Kenya national football team in September 2011 for qualifying matches for the 2012 Africa Cup of Nations. He scored in a warm-up friendly against high school side Kakamega School boys, then made his competitive debut against Uganda on October 8, 2011, coming on the in 88th minute.

== Honours ==
Olando was team captain of Thika United in 2008. He was nominated for the Kenyan Premier League Footballer of the Year Awards for 2009 for Best Midfielder, and nominated for the same award in 2010. Olando won the Kenyan Premier League title with Tusker FC in 2011.
