= Ruslan Tarala =

Russian footballer

Personal information
- Full name: Ruslan Igorevich Tarala
- Date of birth: 15 May 1988 (age 38)
- Place of birth: Omsk, Russian SFSR
- Height: 1.90 m (6 ft 3 in)
- Position: Striker

Youth career
- FC Torpedo Moscow

Senior career*
| Years | Team | Apps | (Gls) |
| 2004–2007 | FC Torpedo Moscow | 4 | (0) |
| 2008 | FC Dynamo Bryansk | 16 | (3) |
| 2008 | FC Dynamo Barnaul | 4 | (0) |
| 2009–2010 | FC Torpedo-ZIL Moscow | 42 | (10) |
| 2011 | FC Neftekhimik Nizhnekamsk | 0 | (0) |
| 2011 | FC Zvezda Ryazan | 7 | (0) |
| 2012 | FC Irtysh Omsk | 19 | (6) |
| 2013 | FC Metallurg-Oskol Stary Oskol | 13 | (3) |
| 2014 | FC Dynamo Bryansk | 2 | (0) |
- * Club domestic league appearances and goals

Ruslan Igorevich Tarala (Russian: Руслан Игоревич Тарала; born 15 May 1988) is a former Russian professional football player.

== Club career ==
He made his debut in the Russian Premier League in 2005 for FC Torpedo Moscow.
