= Ibrahim Morad =

Emirati footballer (born 1988)

Personal information
- Full name: Ibrahim Abdullah Morad Ali
- Date of birth: 9 December 1988 (age 37)
- Place of birth: United Arab Emirates
- Height: 1.68 m (5 ft 6 in)
- Position: Winger

Youth career
- Ittihad Kalba

Senior career*
Years	Team	Apps	(Gls)
2009–2012	Ittihad Kalba		
2012–2014	Al Dhafra		
2014–2017	Ittihad Kalba		
2019–2020	Al Urooba		
- * Club domestic league appearances and goals

Ibrahim Morad (Arabic:إبراهيم مراد) (born 9 December 1988) is an Emirati footballer plays, who played in the Arabian Gulf League for Ittihad Kalba and Al Dhafra.
