= Kamil Cholerzyński =

Polish footballer (born 1988)

Personal information
- Date of birth: 5 December 1988 (age 37)
- Place of birth: Katowice, Poland
- Height: 1.78 m (5 ft 10 in)
- Position: Defender

Team information
- Current team: GKS Katowice III
- Number: 6

Youth career
- GKS Katowice

Senior career*
| Years | Team | Apps | (Gls) |
| 2007–2015 | GKS Katowice | 155 | (6) |
| 2015–2016 | Rozwój Katowice | 21 | (0) |
| 2017 | Motor Lublin | 22 | (2) |
| 2018–2020 | Gwarek Tarnowskie Góry | 56 | (3) |
| 2020–2025 | GKS Katowice II | 120 | (12) |
| 2025– | GKS Katowice III | 8 | (1) |

International career
| 2009 | Poland U21 | 1 | (0) |
- * Club domestic league appearances and goals as of 22:50, 13 September 2026 (UTC)

Kamil Cholerzyński (born 5 December 1988) is a Polish professional footballer who plays as a defender for GKS Katowice III. He also works as a youth coach for GKS' academy.

He has previously played for GKS Katowice, Rozwój Katowice, and Motor Lublin.

== Club career ==
Cholerzyński began his career at GKS Katowice. On 9 September 2007, he made his professional debut, playing the first half of a 1–3 home loss against Wisła Płock. On 4 November 2009, he scored his first I liga goal against Podbeskidzie Bielsko-Biała, scoring the third goal in the match, which GKS won 3–1. In his eight years in the GKS first team, Cholerzyński made a total of 164 appearances in all competitions, scoring 6 goals.

On 29 June 2015, it was announced that Cholerzyński had signed with I liga side Rozwój Katowice. On 18 July 2015, he made his debut for Rozwój, against Stal Mielec in the Polish Cup. He left the club at the end of the 2015–16 season, having made 21 league appearances.

On 7 February 2017, he signed a contract with Motor Lublin.

== International career ==
Cholerzyński made his first and only appearance for the Poland under-21s on 9 October 2009 in a 2011 UEFA EURO Under-21 qualification away match to Liechtenstein at Sportpark Eschen-Mauren.

== Honours ==
Motor Lublin

- Polish Cup (Lublin District regionals): 2016–17

Gwarek Tarnowskie Góry

- Polish Cup (Bytom regionals): 2017–18

GKS Katowice II

- Regional league Silesia IV: 2024–25
- Polish Cup (Katowice regionals): 2021–22, 2024–25

GKS Katowice III

- Klasa A Katowice: 2025–26
