= Michael Ludäscher =

Swiss footballer (born 1988)

Personal information
- Date of birth: 4 May 1988 (age 38)
- Height: 1.85 m (6 ft 1 in)
- Position: Defender

Team information
- Current team: FC Schönenwerd-Niedergösgen

Youth career
- –2006: Team Aargau U21

Senior career*
Years	Team	Apps	(Gls)
2006–2012	Aarau	29	(1)
2006–2007	→ Wangen b.O. (loan)	19	(1)
2009	→ Baden (loan)	20	(3)
2010	→ Gossau (loan)	14	(0)
2012–2013	Baden	31	(2)
2013–2016	FC Muri	66	(8)
2016–2017	Schötz	20	(0)
2017–	FC Schönenwerd-Niedergösgen	0	(0)
- * Club domestic league appearances and goals as of 27 May 2017

Michael Ludäscher (born 4 May 1988) is a Swiss football defender who plays for FC Schönenwerd-Niedergösgen.

== Career ==
He was loaned twice during his career to Baden: from 30 March 2008 to the end of the 2007–08 season, and 7 January 2009 to 30 June 2009.
