= Artur Gieraga =

Polish footballer

Personal information
- Date of birth: 4 May 1988 (age 38)
- Place of birth: Zgierz, Poland
- Height: 1.83 m (6 ft 0 in)
- Position: Defender

Team information
- Current team: Boruta Zgierz
- Number: 4

Senior career*
Years	Team	Apps	(Gls)
2006–2007	Orzeł Parzęczew		
2007–2013	ŁKS Łódź	70	(4)
2013–2014	Ruch Chorzów	4	(0)
2015	GKS Tychy	12	(0)
2015–2018	Motor Lublin	95	(28)
2018–2021	Sokół Aleksandrów Łódzki	70	(8)
2021	Kotwica Kołobrzeg	17	(2)
2021–2022	RKS Radomsko	31	(0)
2022–2024	AKS SMS Łódź	56	(8)
2024–	Boruta Zgierz	59	(13)
- * Club domestic league appearances and goals as of 11:27, 20 July 2026 (UTC)

Artur Gieraga (born 4 May 1988) is a Polish footballer who plays as a defender for IV liga Łódź club Boruta Zgierz.

== Honours ==
ŁKS Łódź

- I liga: 2010–11

Motor Lublin

- III liga Lublin–Subcarpathia: 2015–16

Boruta Zgierz

- Regional league Łódź: 2024–25
