= Cédric De Troetsel =

Belgian footballer

Cedric De Troetsel
Personal information
- Full name: Cedric De Troetsel
- Date of birth: 8 July 1988 (age 38)
- Place of birth: Etterbeek, Belgium
- Height: 1.78 m (5 ft 10 in)
- Position: Right back

Youth career
- Anderlecht
- RWDM Brussels

Senior career*
| Years | Team | Apps | (Gls) |
| 2004–2005 | Lierse SK | 2 | (0) |
| 2005–2007 | FC Brussels | 6 | (0) |
| 2007–2008 | Verbroedering Meldert | 13 | (0) |
| 2008–2014 | Rupel Boom | 104 | (3) |
| 2014–2015 | KFC Oosterzonen | 27 | (0) |
| 2015–2016 | RWDM Brussels | 8 | (0) |
| 2016–2019 | FC Ganshoren | | |
- * Club domestic league appearances and goals

Cedric De Troetsel (born 8 July 1988) is a Belgian retired football defender.

== Career ==
Before his time with K Rupel Boom FC, Cedric De Troetsel played for SK Lierse.

After a spell with Belgian First Division club FC Brussels, Cedric joined K. Rupel Boom FC in the Derde Klasse in 2008.

Amongst the fans, De Troetsel is affectionately known as "Jeromeke", because of his relentless defending and never giving up.

== International career ==
De Troetsel was part of the national -16 and -21 teams.
