= Sékou Fadiga =

Ivorian footballer

Personal information
- Full name: Sékou Fadiga
- Date of birth: January 1, 1988 (age 38)
- Place of birth: Sikensi, Ivory Coast
- Position: Midfielder

Team information
- Current team: Al-Salmiya SC
- Number: 30

Senior career*
Years	Team	Apps	(Gls)
2007–2008	AS Denguélé		
2008–2011	USM Annaba		
2011	Alahly Tripoli S.C.		
2011–2013	Al-Salmiya SC	13	(2)
2011–20xx	AS Denguélé		

International career^{‡}
2010–20xx	Ivory Coast U-23		
- * Club domestic league appearances and goals as of 01:49, 21 April 2008 (UTC) ‡ National team caps and goals as of 01:49, 21 April 2008 (UTC)

Sékou Fadiga is an Ivorian footballer.
