= Salome Khubuluri =

Georgian association footballer

Personal information
- Date of birth: 17 November 1988 (age 37)
- Position: Midfielder

Senior career*
Years	Team	Apps	(Gls)
- Norchi Dinamoeli

International career^{‡}
2005–2006	Georgia U19	5	(0)
2009	Georgia	4	(0)
- * Club domestic league appearances and goals ‡ National team caps and goals as of 24 October 2015

Salome Khubuluri (Georgian: სალომე ხუბულური; born 17 November 1988) is a Georgian footballer who plays as a midfielder. She has been a member of the Georgia women's national team.

== International career ==
Khubuluri capped for Georgia at senior level during the 2011 FIFA Women's World Cup qualification – UEFA Group 3.
