= Alex Marrello =

Canadian soccer player (born 1988)

Personal information
- Date of birth: 28 September 1988 (age 38)
- Place of birth: Vancouver, British Columbia, Canada
- Height: 1.75 m (5 ft 9 in)
- Position: Midfielder

Team information
- Current team: Coquitlam Metro-Ford SC

Youth career
- 2002–2005: Alpha Aztecs
- 2006–2008: Buffalo Bulls
- 2004: NTC British Columbia
- 2009: Ontario United FC
- 2009: Vancouver Thunderbirds

Senior career*
Years	Team	Apps	(Gls)
2011–2012	Veendam	11	(0)
2012	Vancouver Whitecaps FC Residency	7	(0)
2012	Khalsa SC		
2013–	Inter FC		
- * Club domestic league appearances and goals

Alexander Marrello (born 28 September 1988) is a Canadian soccer player, who plays for Vancouver Metro Soccer League club Inter FC.

== Early and personal life ==
Marrello was born to Italian immigrants in Vancouver, British Columbia. His brother Joe Marrello, is a former semi-professional soccer player in the Canadian Soccer League.

== Career ==
Marrello attended the Alpha Secondary school and played club soccer for Burnaby Royals., before playing college soccer for the Cincinnati Bearcats in 2006. He moved to the Buffalo Bulls in 2007. During his last year at the Bulls, he played for Vancouver Whitecaps FC Residency in the PDL. After his graduation in 2011 he signed for Dutch club Veendam. He played 11 games for Veendam in the Eerste Divisie, before returning to Vancouver Whitecaps FC Residency in March 2012, making a further 7 appearances for them in the PDL. Than joined to club Khalsa Sporting Club and played for the club, six months in the Pacific Coast Soccer League. In August 2013 Marrello signed for Inter FC in the Vancouver Metro Soccer League.

=== International ===
Marrello was called up to the Canada men's national under–17 soccer team for the first time for a training camp in Burnaby in February 2014.

== Honours ==
- 2014: BC Adult Player of the Year
