= Adrian Chomiuk =

Polish footballer

Personal information
- Date of birth: 23 June 1988 (age 38)
- Place of birth: Biała Podlaska, Poland
- Height: 1.70 m (5 ft 7 in)
- Position: Defender

Youth career
- 2001–2003: TOP 54 Biała Podlaska
- 2005–2007: Gwarek Zabrze

Senior career*
Years	Team	Apps	(Gls)
2007–2012	Polonia Bytom	44	(0)
2008	→ Kolejarz Stróże (loan)	10	(0)
2009	→ Polonia Słubice (loan)	11	(0)
2009	→ MKS Mielnik (loan)	15	(0)
2012	Bytovia Bytów	13	(0)
2012–2014	GKS Tychy	58	(0)
2014–2015	Termalica Bruk-Bet	11	(0)
2015–2016	Bytovia Bytów	21	(1)
2016	Asker	6	(0)
2017–2018	Flint Fotball	9	(1)
2019	Eik Tønsberg		
- * Club domestic league appearances and goals

Adrian Chomiuk (born 23 June 1988) is a Polish former professional footballer who played as a defender.

== Club career ==
Chomiuk started his career in 2001 in the student sports club TOP 54 Biała Podlaska, where he trained until 2003. In 2005, he became a player of Gwarek Zabrze. In 2006, Chomiuk took part in Gwarek's successful Polish Under-19 Championship campaign.

In 2007, he moved to Polonia Bytom. On 6 October 2007, he made his debut in Ekstraklasa in a 3–0 win over GKS Bełchatów, entering the playing field in the 82nd minute as a substitute for Jakub Dziółka. Before the 2008–09 season, he was loaned to the third tier club Kolejarz Stróże, then to Polonia Słubice in the same division, and, on 24 August 2009, for six months to III liga side MKS Mielnik. In the spring of the 2009–10 season, Chomiuk returned to Polonia. On 2 July 2010, he signed a new deal, tying him with the club until 30 June 2013. On 14 December 2011, at the player's request, his contract was terminated.

On 18 February 2012, he signed a contract with third division side Bytovia Bytów.

On 12 July 2012, he moved up one tier by signing a one-year contract with GKS Tychy, with an option to extend it for another year. On 4 July 2013, the option to prolong the contract for a further twelve months was exercised. On 28 June 2014, it was announced his deal would not be extended. (Note: "Adrian Chomiuk pożegnał się z GKS-em Tychy" [Adrian Chomiuk said goodbye to GKS Tychy]. 90minut (in Polish). 28 June 2014.)

Two days later, he signed a one-year contract with Bruk-Bet Termalica Nieciecza. On 7 July, he tore his Achilles tendon; the day after, he underwent surgery. For the first time after the injury (it was also his debut for the club in Nieciecza), he appeared on 11 April 2015 in a 1–2 loss to Widzew Łódź in the 25th round of the 2014–15 season. On 30 May, together with Termalica, he secured a promotion to Ekstraklasa.
