= Silvio Arango =

Colombian footballer (born 1988)

Personal information
- Full name: Silvio Arango Betancourt
- Date of birth: June 22, 1988 (age 38)
- Place of birth: Victoria, Colombia
- Height: 1.75 m (5 ft 9 in)
- Position: Midfielder

Senior career*
Years	Team	Apps	(Gls)
2006–2007	Once Caldas	24	(1)
2008–2009	La Equidad	3	(0)
2009–2010	Aucas	3	(1)
2011	Sportivo Trinidense	0	(0)
2012	Once Caldas	23	(1)
2014	Deportivo Pereira	10	(3)
Medal record
First place	Copa Colombia	2008
- * Club domestic league appearances and goals

Silvio Arango Betancourt (born June 22, 1988) is a Colombian former footballer.

== Titles ==
- La Equidad 2008 (Copa Colombia)
