= Paco Durrio =

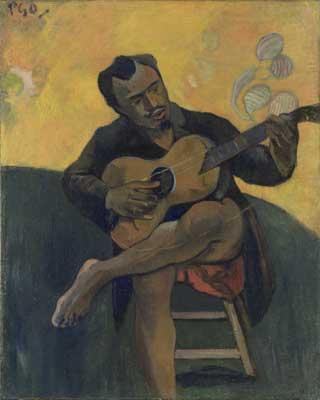
The Guitarist; a portrait of Paco Durrio by Paul Gauguin (c.1900)

Francisco Durrio de Madrón, known as Paco Durrio (22 May 1868, Valladolid - 30 August 1940, Paris) was a Spanish sculptor, ceramicist and goldsmith; of French descent. He worked in the Art Nouveau and Symbolist styles.

== Life and work ==
His father was a basket maker from France and the family name was originally "Durrieu". He received his initial training in Bilbao, then went to Madrid in 1881, where he trained with the sculptor, Justo de Gandarias. In 1888, he moved to Paris; joining a group of artists centered around Paul Gauguin and, from 1893 to 1895, sharing a studio with him. During this time, he was largely involved with ceramics.

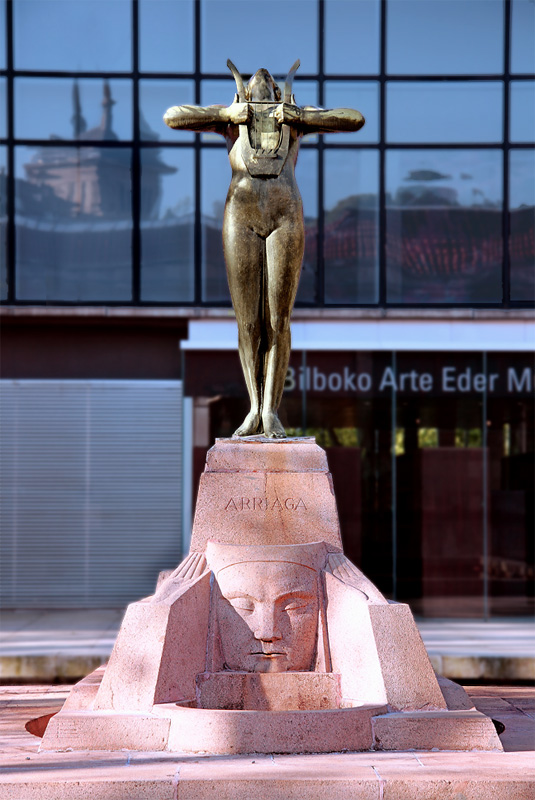
Monument to Arriaga

His first solo exhibit took place in 1896 and, in 1900, he participated in a major Modernist exhibition in Bilbao. In 1901, he moved into a studio in Montmartre, which was taken over by Pablo Picasso in 1904. That year, he built his own home nearby and installed a huge ceramic kiln. He would live there until 1939. He helped Picasso create his first ceramic works in 1905.

After 1905, he began work on a memorial to the composer, Juan Crisóstomo de Arriaga but, rather than portraying the composer himself, he chose to depict the muse, Melpomene, playing a lyre. As a result, the statue was not erected until almost thirty years later, in 1933. Overall, the most positive criticism was reserved for his ceramics. He was also a devoted art collector; acquiring numerous works by his contemporaries, including a large number by Gauguin.

He died poor and almost forgotten in a Paris hospital. In 1945, after the war, a major retrospective was held at the Salon d’Automne and a large selection of his jewelry went on display at the Victoria and Albert Museum in London. In 2013, the Museo de Bellas Artes de Bilbao held another retrospective that included pieces from his art collection.
