= Marcos Román =

Nicaraguan footballer

Personal information
- Full name: Marcos Antonio Román Solís
- Date of birth: October 4, 1988 (age 38)
- Place of birth: Nicaragua
- Position: Midfielder

Team information
- Current team: Diriangén

Senior career*
Years	Team	Apps	(Gls)
2008–2012	Diriangén		
2012–2013	Managua		
2013–present	Diriangén		

International career^{‡}
2011–	Nicaragua	3	(0)
- * Club domestic league appearances and goals as of 02:32, 23 February 2012 (UTC) ‡ National team caps and goals as of 02:32, 23 February 2012 (UTC)

Marcos Antonio Román Solís (born 4 October 1988) is a Nicaraguan professional footballer who plays as a midfielder for Diriangén.

== Club career ==
He has played his entire career for Diriangén, except for one season at Managua whom he left after a major clear-out in summer 2013.

== International career ==
Román made his debut for Nicaragua in a May 2011 friendly match against Cuba and has, as of December 2013, earned a total of 3 caps, scoring no goals.
