= Longitude by chronometer =

Navigational method

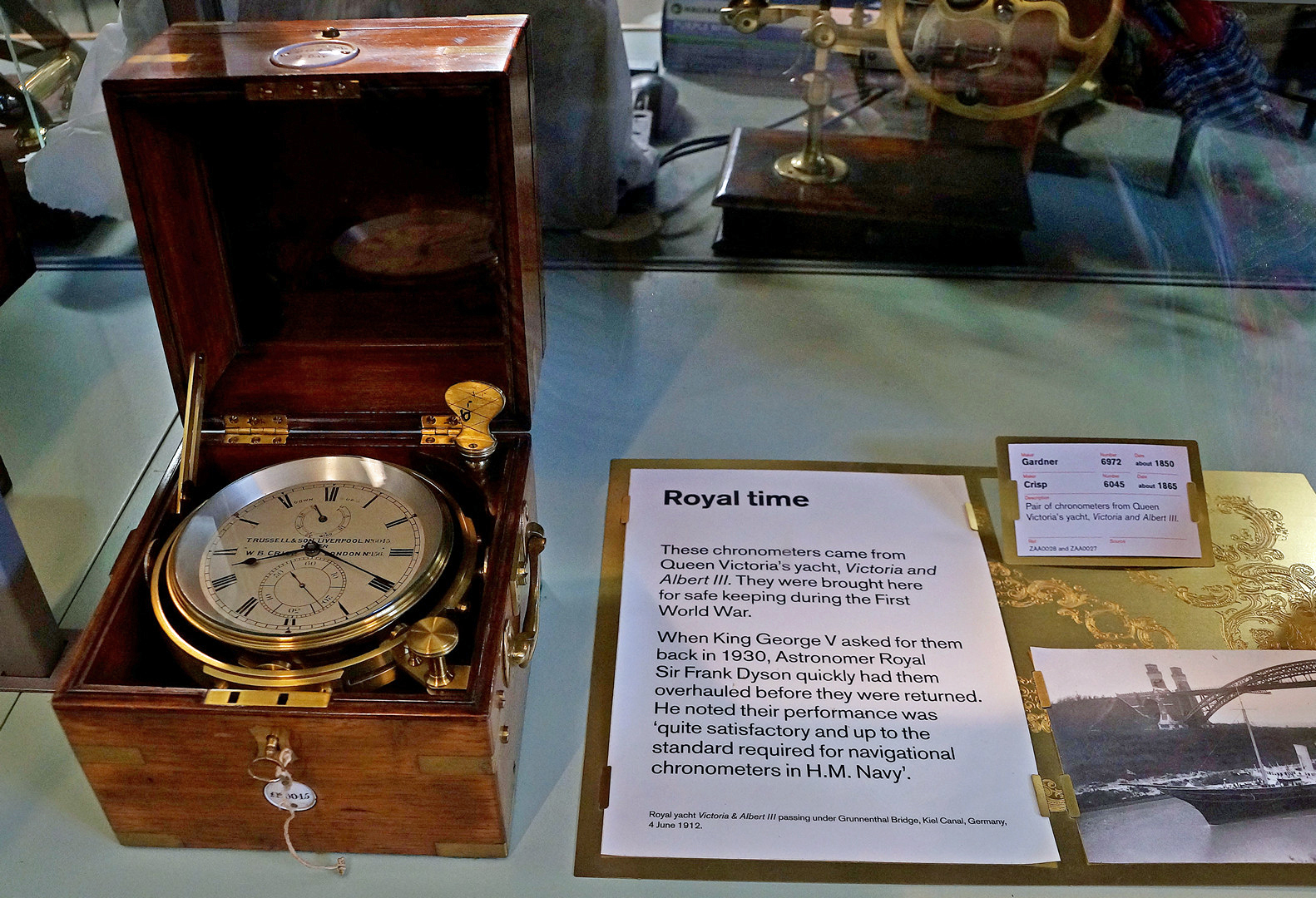
Mechanical boxed Marine Chronometer used on Queen Victoria's royal yacht, made about 1865

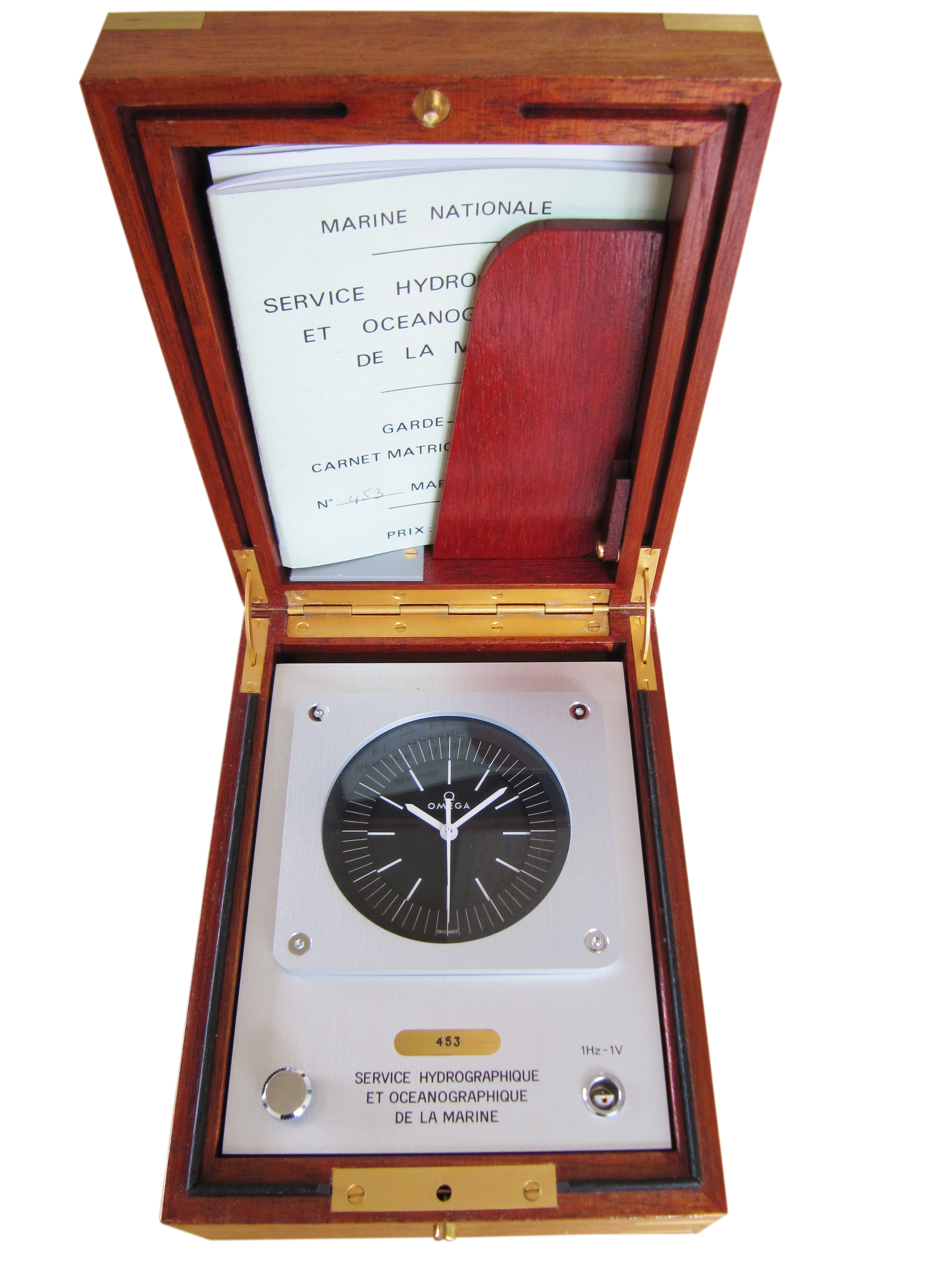
Omega 4.19 MHz (4194304 = 2^{22} high frequency quartz resonator) Ships Marine Chronometer giving an autonomous accuracy of less than ± 5 seconds per year, French Navy issued,1980

Longitude by chronometer is a method, in navigation, of determining longitude using a marine chronometer, which was developed by John Harrison during the first half of the eighteenth century. It is an astronomical method of calculating the longitude at which a position line, drawn from a sight by sextant of any celestial body, crosses the observer's assumed latitude. In order to calculate the position line, the time of the sight must be known so that the celestial position i.e. the Greenwich Hour Angle (Celestial Longitude - measured in a westerly direction from Greenwich) and Declination (Celestial Latitude - measured north or south of the equational or celestial equator), of the observed celestial body is known. All that can be derived from a single sight is a single position line, which can be achieved at any time during daylight when both the sea horizon and the sun are visible. To achieve a fix, more than one celestial body and the sea horizon must be visible. This is usually only possible at dawn and dusk.

The angle between the sea horizon and the celestial body is measured with a sextant and the time noted. The Sextant reading is known as the 'Sextant Altitude'. This is corrected by use of tables to a 'True Altitude'. The actual declination and hour angle of the celestial body are found from astronomical tables for the time of the measurement and together with the 'True Altitude' are put into a formula with the assumed latitude. This formula calculates the 'True Hour Angle' which is compared to the assumed longitude providing a correction to the assumed longitude. This correction is applied to the assumed position so that a position line can be drawn through the assumed latitude at the corrected longitude at 90° to the azimuth (bearing) on the celestial body. The observer's position is somewhere along the position line, not necessarily at the found longitude at the assumed latitude. If two or more sights or measurements are taken within a few minutes of each other a 'fix' can be obtained and the observer's position determined as the point where the position lines cross.

The azimuth (bearing) of the celestial body is also determined by use of astronomical tables and for which the time must also be known.

From this, it can be seen that a navigator will need to know the time very accurately so that the position of the observed celestial body is known just as accurately. The position of the sun is given in degrees and minutes north or south of the equational or celestial equator and east or west of Greenwich, established by the English as the Prime Meridian.

The desperate need for an accurate chronometer was finally met in the mid 18th century when an Englishman, John Harrison, produced a series of chronometers that culminated in his celebrated model H-4 that satisfied the requirements for a shipboard standard time-keeper.

Many nations, such as France, have proposed their own reference longitudes as a standard, although the world’s navigators have generally come to accept the reference longitudes tabulated by the British. The reference longitude adopted by the British became known as the Prime Meridian and is now accepted by most nations as the starting point for all longitude measurements. The Prime Meridian of zero degrees longitude runs along the meridian passing through the Royal Observatory at Greenwich, England. Longitude is measured east and west from the Prime Meridian. To determine "longitude by chronometer," a navigator requires a chronometer set to the local time at the Prime Meridian. Local time at the Prime Meridian has historically been called Greenwich Mean Time (GMT), but now, due to international sensitivities, has been renamed as Coordinated Universal Time (UTC), and is known colloquially as "zulu time".

== Noon sight for Longitude ==
Noon sights obtain the observer's Latitude. It is impossible to determine longitude with an accuracy better than 10 nautical miles (19 km) by means of a noon sight without averaging techniques. A noon sight is called a Meridian Altitude. While it is very easy to determine the observer's latitude at noon without knowing the exact time, longitude cannot accurately be measured at noon. At noon the sun's change of altitude is very slow, so determining the exact time that the sun is at its highest by direct observation is impossible, and therefore it is impossible to obtain an accurate longitude at the moment of culmination. However, it is possible to determine the time of culmination for longitude with a useful accuracy by performing a mean time of observation when the sun is on its ascent and descent prior to and following its moment of culmination. By taking a sextant reading within 15 to 30 minutes prior to local noon (culmination) and noting the time, then leaving the sextant set to the same angle and subsequently observing the moment in time at which the sun passes through the sight tube on its descent from its highest altitude between a half-hour and hour later, the two times can be averaged to obtain a longitude sufficiently accurate for navigation (within 2 nautical miles [3.7 km]).

=== Corrections to the process ===
Unfortunately, the Earth does not make a perfect circular orbit around the Sun. Due to the elliptical nature of the Earth’s orbit around the Sun, the speed of the Sun’s apparent orbit around the Earth varies throughout the year and that causes it to appear to speed up and slow down very slightly. Consequently, noon at the Prime Meridian is rarely if ever exactly at 12:00 UTC, but rather it occurs some minutes and seconds before or after that time each day. This slight daily variation has been calculated and is listed for each day of the year in the Nautical almanac under the title of Equation of time. This variation must be added to or subtracted from the UTC of local apparent noon to improve the accuracy of the calculation. Using the Equation of time correction along with the time averaged ascending/descending noon sights can result in accuracies of 1 nautical mile (1.9 km) or less. Without time averaging, the difficulties in determining the exact moment of local noon due to the flattening of the Sun’s arc across the sky reduce the accuracy of calculation. Other celestial navigation methods involving more extensive use of both the Nautical almanac and sight reduction tables are also used by navigators at various times of day for longitudinal readings within 1 nautical mile (1.9 km).

== Time sight ==
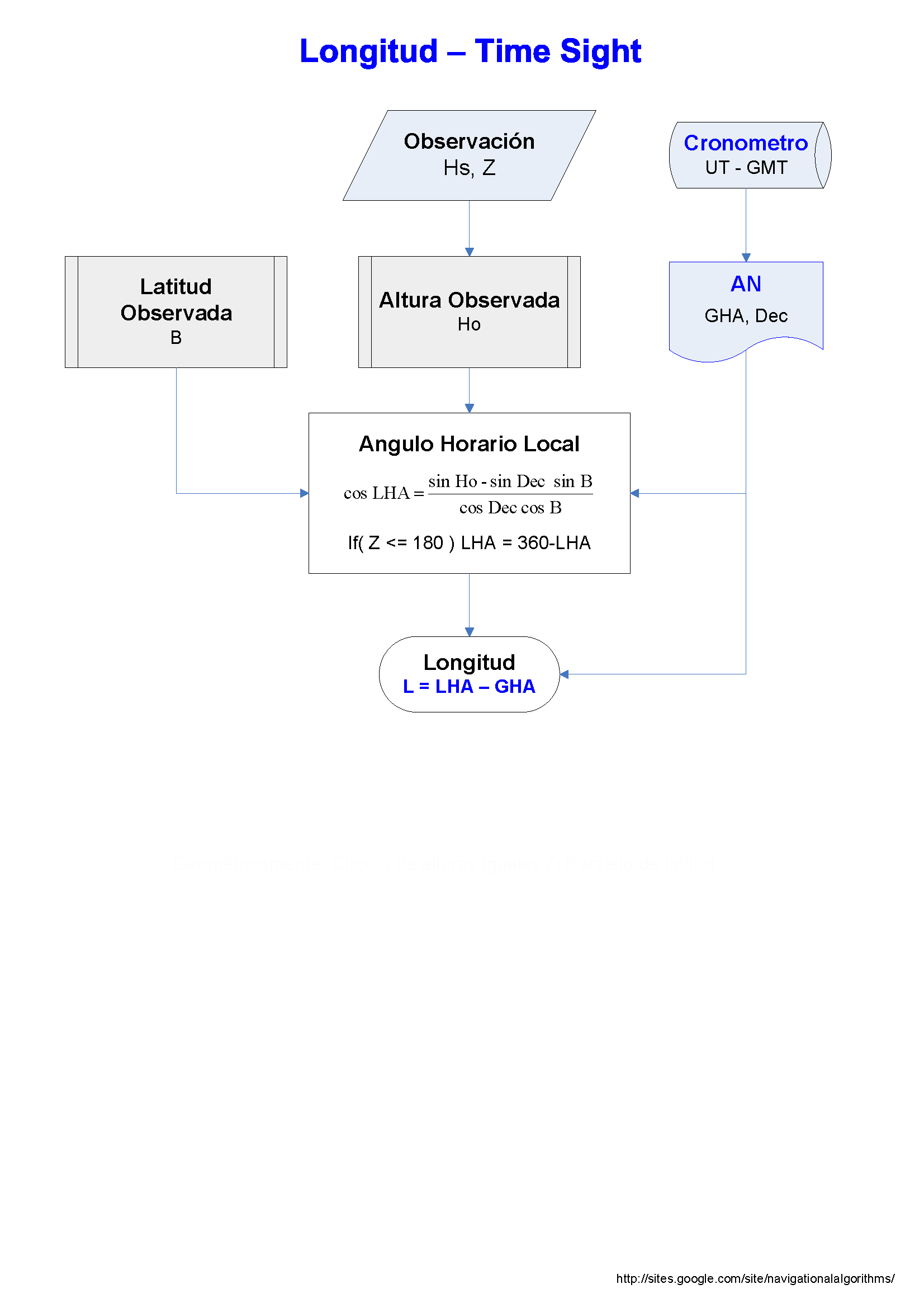
Calculating longitude by time sight.

This only calculates a longitude at the assumed latitude, though a position line can be drawn. The observer is somewhere along the position line.

Time sight is a general method for determining longitude by celestial observations using a chronometer; these observations are reduced by solving the navigational triangle for meridian angle and require known values for altitude, latitude, and declination; the meridian angle is converted to local hour angle and compared with Greenwich hour angle.

If δ is the declination of the observed celestial body and H_{o} is its observed altitude, the local hour angle, LHA, is obtained for a known latitude B by:

$$\cos(\mathrm{LHA}) = \frac{\sin(H_\mathrm{o}) - \sin(\delta) \cdot \sin(B)}{\cos(\delta) \cdot \cos(B)}.$$

The time sight was a complement to the noon sight or latitude by Polaris in order to obtain a fix.

== See also ==
- Celestial navigation
- Navigation
- Latitude
- Longitude
- Haversine formula
- Intercept method
- Meridian altitude
- Lunar distance
- Navigational algorithms
- Sight reduction
