= Intercept method =

Astronomical navigation technique

In astronomical navigation, the intercept method, also known as Marcq St. Hilaire method, is a method of calculating an observer's position on Earth (geopositioning). It was originally called the azimuth intercept method because the process involves drawing a line which intercepts the azimuth line. This name was shortened to intercept method and the intercept distance was shortened to 'intercept'.

The method yields a line of position (LOP) on which the observer is situated. The intersection of two or more such lines will define the observer's position, called a "fix". Sights may be taken at short intervals, usually during hours of twilight, or they may be taken at an interval of an hour or more (as in observing the Sun during the day). In either case, the lines of position, if taken at different times, must be advanced or retired to correct for the movement of the ship during the interval between observations. If observations are taken at short intervals, a few minutes at most, the corrected lines of position by convention yield a "fix". If the lines of position must be advanced or retired by an hour or more, convention dictates that the result is referred to as a "running fix".

== Summary ==
The intercept method is based on the following principle. The actual distance from the observer to the geographical position (GP) of a celestial body (that is, the point where it is directly overhead) is "measured" using a sextant. The observer has already estimated his position by dead reckoning and calculated the distance from the estimated position to the body's GP; the difference between the "measured" and calculated distances is called the intercept.

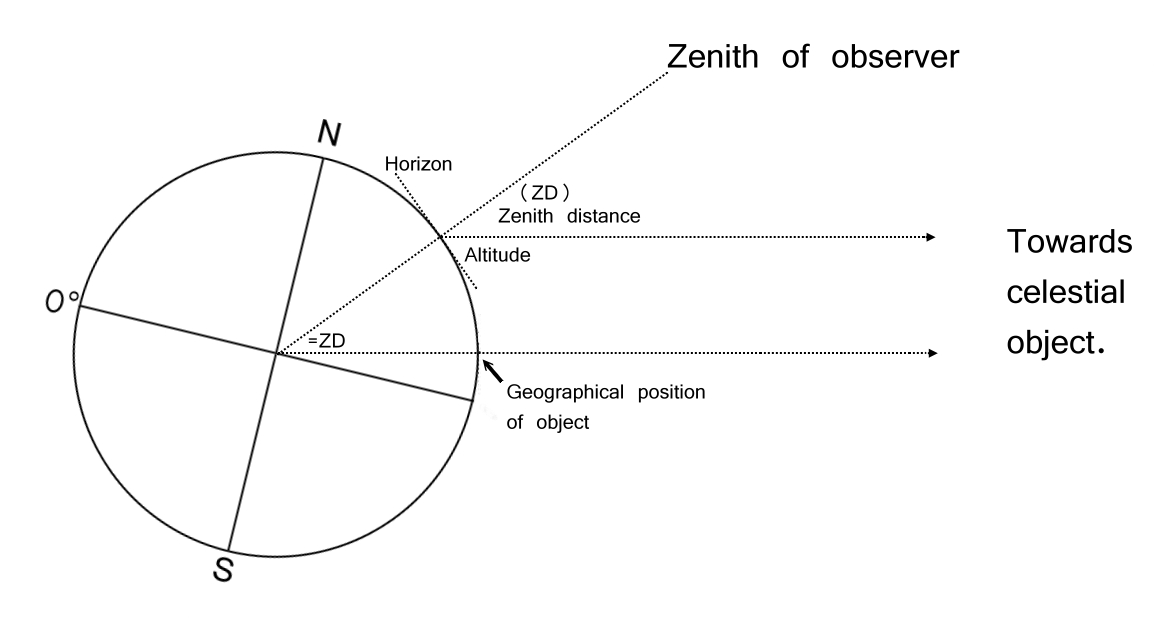

The diagram on the right shows why the zenith distance of a celestial body is equal to the angular distance of its GP from the observer's position.

The rays of light from a celestial body are assumed to be parallel (unless the observer is looking at the moon, which is too close for such a simplification). The angle at the centre of the Earth that the ray of light passing through the body's GP makes with the line running from the observer's zenith is the same as the zenith distance. This is because they are corresponding angles. In practice it is not necessary to use zenith distances, which are 90° minus altitude, as the calculations can be done using observed altitude and calculated altitude.

Taking a sight using the intercept method consists of the following process:

- Observe the altitude above the horizon Ho of a celestial body and note the time of the observation.
- Assume a certain geographical position (lat., lon.), it does not matter which one so long as it is within, say, 50 NM of the actual position (or even 100 NM would not introduce too much error). Compute the altitude Hc and azimuth Zn with which an observer situated at that assumed position would observe the body.
- If the actual observed altitude Ho is smaller than the computed altitude Hc this means the observer is farther away from the body than the observer at the assumed position, and vice versa. For each minute of arc the distance is one NM and the difference between Hc and Ho expressed in minutes of arc (which equal NM) is termed the "intercept". The navigator now has computed the intercept and azimuth of the body.
- On the chart he marks the assumed position AP and draws a line in the direction of the azimuth Zn. He then measures the intercept distance along this azimuth line, towards the body if Ho>Hc and away from it if Ho<Hc. At this new point he draws a perpendicular to the azimuth line and that is the line of position LOP at the moment of the observation.
- The reason that the chosen AP is not important (within limits) is that if a position closer to the body is chosen then Hc will be greater but the distance will be measured from the new AP which is closer to the body and the end resulting LOP will be the same.

== Methodology ==
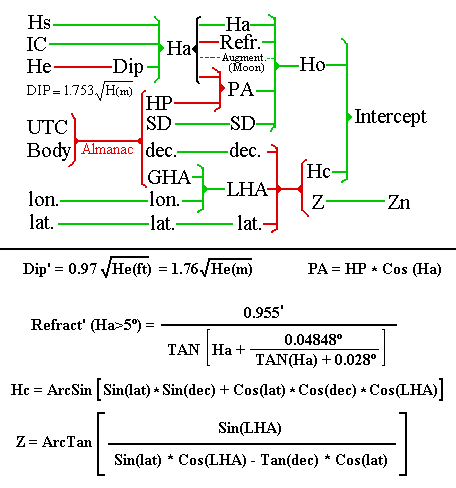
Diagram illustrating the intercept sight reduction process

Suitable bodies for celestial sights are selected, often using a Rude Star Finder. Using a sextant, an altitude is obtained of the Sun, the Moon, a star or a planet. The name of the body and the precise time of the sight in UTC is recorded. Then the sextant is read and the altitude (Hs) of the body is recorded. Once all sights are taken and recorded, the navigator is ready to start the process of sight reduction and plotting.

The first step in sight reduction is to correct the sextant altitude for various errors and corrections. The instrument may have an error, IC or index correction (see article on adjusting a sextant). Refraction by the atmosphere is corrected for with the aid of a table or calculation and the observer's height of eye above sea level results in a "dip" correction (as the observer's eye is raised the horizon dips below the horizontal). If the Sun or Moon was observed, a semidiameter correction is also applied to find the centre of the object. The resulting value is "observed altitude" (Ho).

Next, using an accurate clock, the observed celestial object's geographic position (GP) is looked up in an almanac. That's the point on the Earth's surface directly below it (where the object is in the zenith). The latitude of the geographic position is called declination, and the longitude is usually called the hour angle.

Next, the altitude and azimuth of the celestial body are computed for a selected position (assumed position or AP). This involves resolving a spherical triangle. Given the three magnitudes: local hour angle (LHA), observed body's declination (dec), and assumed latitude (lat), the altitude Hc and azimuth Zn must be computed. The local hour angle, LHA, is the difference between the AP longitude and the hour angle of the observed object. It is always measured in a westerly direction from the assumed position.

The relevant formulas (derived using the spherical trigonometric identities) are:

$$\sin(Hc) = \sin(lat) \cdot \sin(dec) + \cos(lat) \cdot \cos(dec) \cdot \cos(LHA)$$

$$\begin{align}
\tan(Zn) = \tan(Zn \pm 180) &= \frac{\sin(LHA)}{\sin(lat) \cdot \cos(LHA) - \cos(lat) \cdot \tan(dec)} \triangleq tanZ \\
Z &= arctan(tanZ) \text{   } \in [-90,+90] \\
Zn &= \begin{cases}
Z     & \text{if }LHA \in [0,90] \\
Z+180 & \text{if }LHA \in [90,270]\\
Z+360 & \text{if }LHA \in [270,360] && \equiv \text{ mod 360}\\
\end{cases} \\
\end{align}$$

The adjustment from Z to Zn (which is in $[0,360]$, and measured from North) has two reasons:

(1)The angles in [0,360] with the same $\tan$ is not unique (since $\tan(X) = tan (X \pm 180)$), but $\arctan$ is defined only in $[-90,90]$.
(2)The negative angle must be adjusted to positive angle.

or, alternatively,

$$\begin{align}
\cos(\pm Zn) &= \frac{\sin(dec) - \sin(lat) \cdot \sin(Hc)}{\cos(lat) \cdot \cos(Hc)} \triangleq cosZ \\
Z & = \arccos(cosZ) \text {   } \in [0,180] \\
Zn &= \begin{cases}
+Z     & \text{if }LHA \in [180,360] \\
-Z+360 & \text{if }LHA \in [0,180] \\
\end{cases} \\
\end{align}$$
The adjustment for disambiguating $\cos$ values has similar reasons.

Where

Hc = Computed altitude
Zn = Computed azimuth (Zn=0 at North)
Z = preliminary result for Zn (in some nautical almanacs)
lat = Latitude
dec = Declination
LHA = Local Hour Angle

These computations can be done easily using electronic calculators or computers but traditionally there were methods which used logarithm or haversine tables. Some of these methods were H.O. 211 (Ageton), Davies, haversine, etc. The relevant haversine formula for Hc is

$$\operatorname{hav}(\overline{Hc}) = \operatorname{hav}(LHA) \cdot cos(lat) \cdot cos(dec) + \operatorname{hav}(lat \pm dec)$$

Where H̅c̅ is the zenith distance, or complement of Hc.

H̅c̅ = 90° - Hc.

The relevant formula for Zn is

$$\operatorname{hav}(Zn) = \frac{ \cos(lat - Hc) - \sin(dec)}{2 \cdot \cos(lat) \cdot \cos(Hc)}$$

When using such tables or a computer or scientific calculator, the navigation triangle is solved directly, so any assumed position can be used. Often the dead reckoning DR position is used. This simplifies plotting and also reduces any slight error caused by plotting a segment of a circle as a straight line.

With the use of astral navigation for air navigation, faster methods needed to be developed and tables of precomputed triangles were developed. When using precomputed sight reduction tables, selection of the assumed position is one of the trickier steps for the fledgling navigator to master. Sight reduction tables provide solutions for navigation triangles of integral degree values. When using precomputed sight reduction tables, such as H.O. 229, the assumed position must be selected to yield integer degree values for LHA (local hour angle) and latitude. West longitudes are subtracted and east longitudes are added to GHA to derive LHA, so AP's must be selected accordingly. When using precomputed sight reduction tables each observation and each body will require a different assumed position.

Professional navigators are divided in usage between sight reduction tables on the one hand, and handheld computers or scientific calculators on the other. The methods are equally accurate. It is simply a matter of personal preference which method is used. An experienced navigator can reduce a sight from start to finish in about five minutes using nautical tables or a scientific calculator.

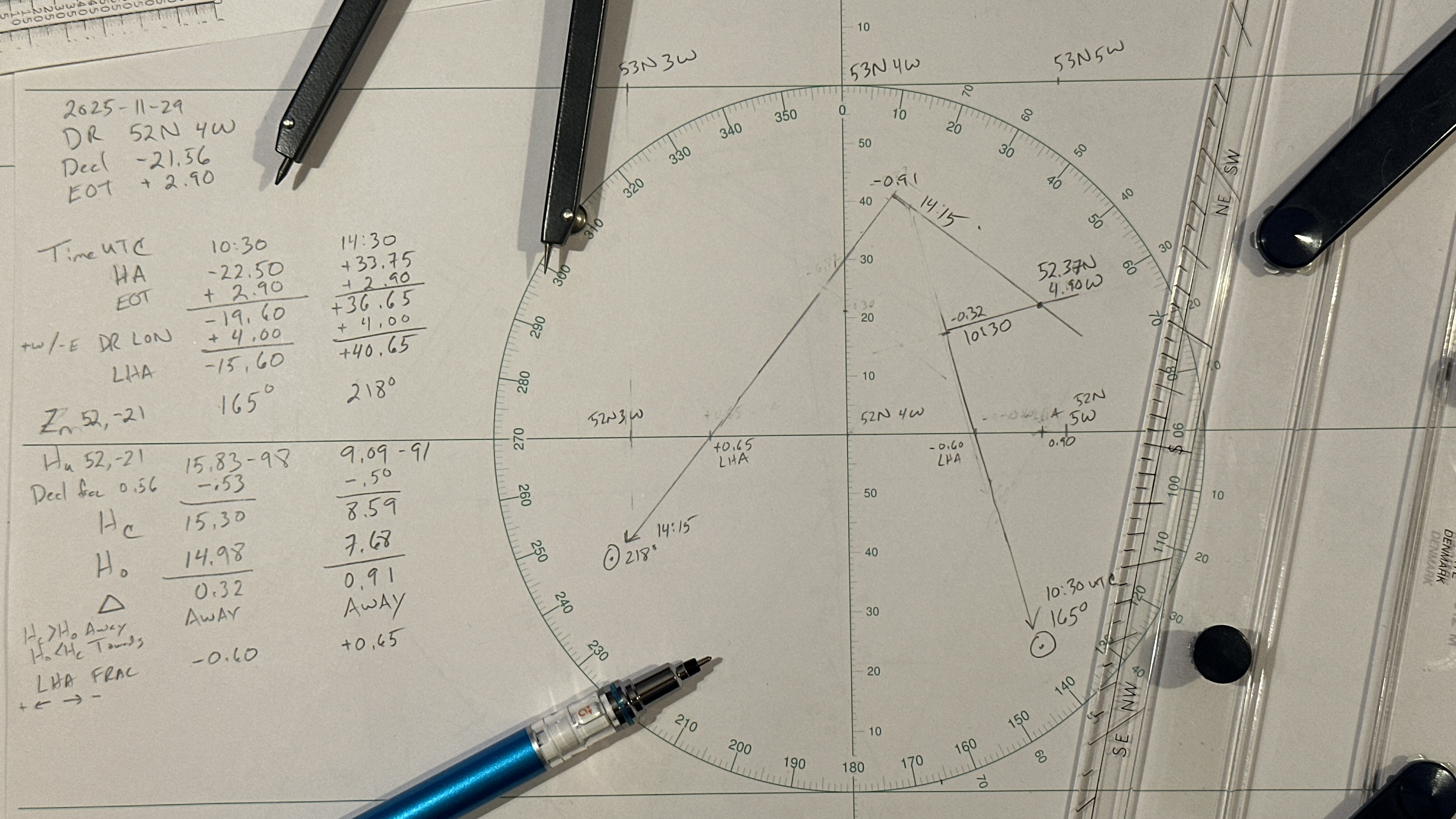
The lines of positions for two sun sights are plotted using the intercept method along with the computation of the Hc and Zn values.

The precise location of the assumed position has no great impact on the result, as long as it is reasonably close to the observer's actual position. An assumed position within 1 degree of arc of the observer's actual position is usually considered acceptable.

The calculated altitude (Hc) is compared to the observed altitude (Ho, sextant altitude (Hs) corrected for various errors). The difference between Hc and Ho is called "intercept" and is the observer's distance from the assumed position. The resulting line of position (LOP) is a small segment of the circle of equal altitude, and is represented by a straight line perpendicular to the azimuth of the celestial body. When plotting the small segment of this circle on a chart it is drawn as a straight line, the resulting tiny errors are too small to be significant.

Navigators use the memory aid "computed greater away" to determine whether the observer is farther from the body's geographic position (measure intercept from Hc away from the azimuth). If the Hc is less than Ho, then the observer is closer to the body's geographic position, and intercept is measured from the AP toward the azimuth direction.

The last step in the process is to plot the lines of position LOP and determine the vessel's location. Each assumed position is plotted first. Best practise is to then advance or retire the assumed positions to correct for vessel motion during the interval between sights. Each LOP is then constructed from its associated AP by striking off the azimuth to the body, measuring intercept toward or away from the azimuth, and constructing the perpendicular line of position.

To obtain a fix (a position) this LOP must be crossed with another LOP either from another sight or from elsewhere e.g. a bearing of a point of land or crossing a depth contour such as the 200 metre depth line on a chart.

== Sights ==
Until the age of satellite navigation ships usually took sights at dawn, during the forenoon, at noon (meridian transit of the Sun) and dusk. The morning and evening sights were taken during twilight while the horizon was visible and the stars, planets and/or Moon were visible, at least through the telescope of a sextant. Two observations are always required to give a position accurate to within a mile under favourable conditions. Three are always sufficient.

== Running fix ==
A fix is called a running fix when one or more of the LOPs used to obtain it is an LOP advanced or retrieved over time. In order to get a fix the LOP must cross at an angle, the closer to 90° the better. This means the observations must have different azimuths. During the day, if only the Sun is visible, it is possible to get an LOP from the observation but not a fix as another LOP is needed. What may be done is take a first sight which yields one LOP and, some hours later, when the Sun's azimuth has changed substantially, take a second sight which yields a second LOP. Knowing the distance and course sailed in the interval, the first LOP can be advanced to its new position and the intersection with the second LOP yields a running fix.

Any sight can be advanced and used to obtain a running fix. It may be that the navigator due to weather conditions could only obtain a single sight at dawn. The resulting LOP can then be advanced when, later in the morning, a Sun observation becomes possible. The precision of a running fix depends on the error in distance and course so, naturally, a running fix tends to be less precise than an unqualified fix and the navigator must take into account his confidence in the exactitude of distance and course to estimate the resulting error in the running fix.

Determining a fix by crossing LOPs and advancing LOPs to get running fixes are not specific to the intercept method and can be used with any sight reduction method or with LOPs obtained by any other method (bearings, etc.).

== See also ==
- Celestial navigation
- Circle of equal altitude
- Sight reduction
- Intersection (air navigation)
- Intersection (land navigation)
- Navigation
- Latitude
- Longitude
- Haversine formula
- Longitude by chronometer
