= Position circle =

A position circle is a circle that can be measured both from a chart and from the surface of the earth for the purpose of position fixing. For the purposes of land or coastal navigation, a position circle can be generated by making a horizontal angle measurement between two landmarks using a sextant. Two overlapping position circles, or one position circle and one or more other observations can be used to give a position fix.

When a horizontal angle measurement is made between two known points on land, the observer will be located at the apex of a triangle, with the other two corners of this triangle consisting of the landmark pair. The observer will also be sitting on a set of points that fall along a large circle. The diameter of the circle will be dependent upon the distance between the landmark pair and the range of the observer to the landmark pair. At each point along this circle, the angular separation between the landmark pairs will be the same. Two such circles exist, one in front of the landmark pair, and one on the backside. It is usually straightforward to tell which circle is relevant. After the observation is made, the angular reading can be transferred onto a nautical chart (or map) by means of a protractor instrument.

The origin of the circle can be found as follows. Draw a baseline connecting the two landmarks. Bisect the line using a compass. Construct a line 90 degrees to the baseline using a compass. Using a protractor, draw a line from either landmark to intersect the 90 degree line off the baseline at the observed angle. This point is the origin of the circle of position. Using a compass again, the entire circle can be drawn.

== See also ==
- Circle of equal altitude
- Navigation
- Position line
- Compass
