= Intersection (aeronautics) =

Virtual navigational fix for aircraft

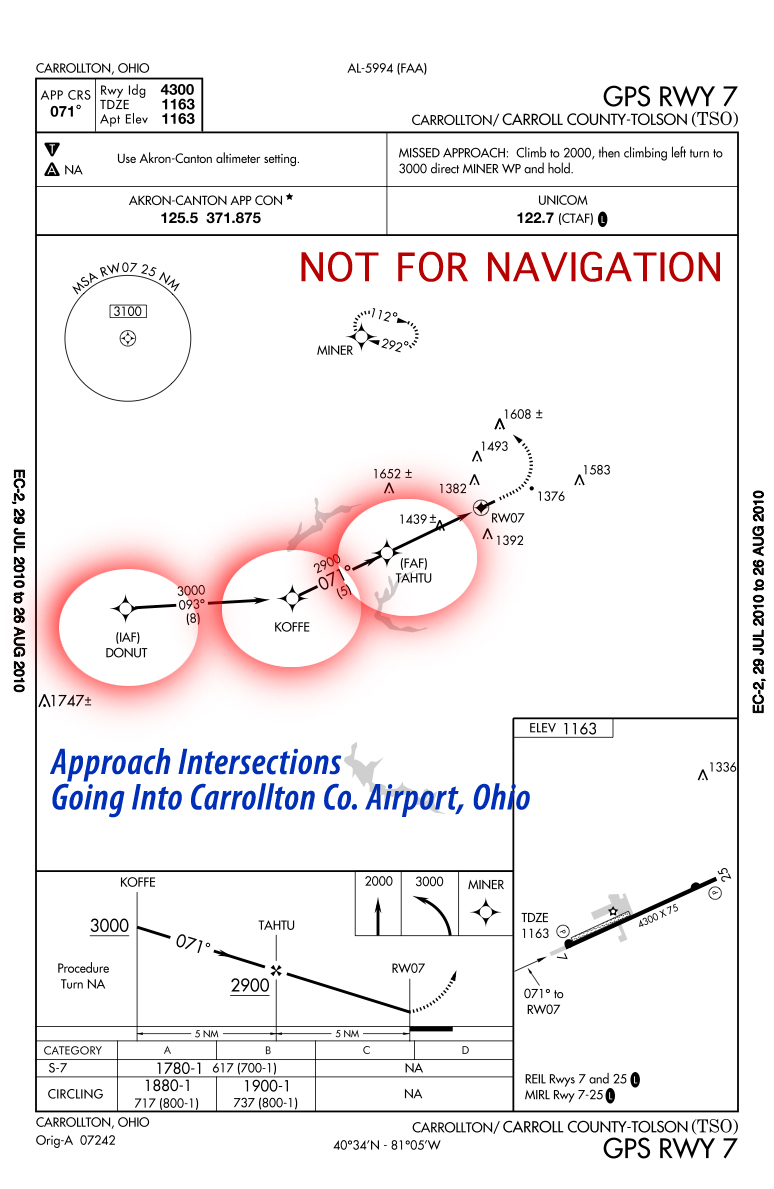
Terminal Procedure with Approach Intersections

In aviation, an intersection is a virtual navigational fix that helps aircraft maintain their flight plan. It is usually defined as the intersection (in the geometrical sense) of two VOR (VHF Omnidirectional Range) radials. They are usually identified as major airway intersections where aircraft, operating under instrument flight rules, often change direction of flight while en route. According to the Federal Aviation Regulations, some intersections are designated as mandatory reporting points for pilots who are not in radar contact with air traffic control.

Intersections also play an important role in departure and approach procedures. All intersections have an alphabetical or alphanumeric designation. Near major airports, the intersection designation code typically consists of three letters followed by the runway number. Most other intersection designations consist of five-letter combinations that are either pronounceable or chosen for their mnemonic value, since either air traffic control or the flight plan may require the pilot to announce the designation. In the terminal procedure or approach plate example to the right, note that two of the intersections are called DONUT and KOFFE. Many intersections are named because of local points of interest. In the case of Carroll County Airport, there is a popular diner located on the field to which many pilots fly.

== See also ==
- Fix (position)
- Position line
- Intercept method
- Intersection (land navigation)
