= Almucantar =

Circle on the celestial sphere parallel to the horizon

The celestial sphere with the zenith and almucantar marked in red, the horizon in green, and the path of a star or the Sun in blue.

An almucantar (also spelled almucantarat or almacantara) is a circle on the celestial sphere parallel to the horizon. Two stars that lie on the same almucantar have the same altitude.

The term was introduced into European astronomy by monastic astronomer Hermann Contractus of Reichenau, Latinized from the Arabic word al-muqanṭarah ("the almucantar, sundial", plural: al-muqanṭarāt), derived from qanṭarah ("arch, bridge")

== Almucantar staff ==
An almucantar staff is an instrument chiefly used to determine the time of sunrise and sunset, in order to find the amplitude and consequently the variations of the compass. Usually made of pear tree or boxwood, with an arch of 15° to 30°, it is an example of a backstaff.

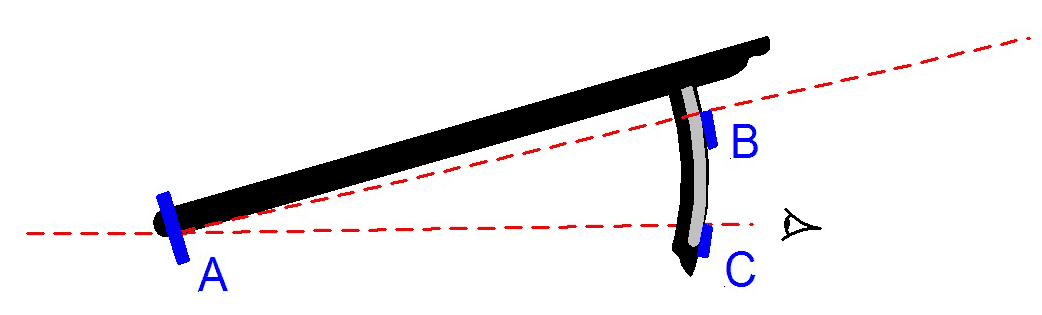
This is a drawing of an almucantar staff. There are three vanes - the horizon vane (A), the shadow vane (B) and the sighting vane (C).

The sun casts a shadow of a vane (B in the adjacent image) on a horizon vane (A). The horizon vane has a slit or hole to allow the observer to see the horizon in the distance. The observer aligns the horizon and shadow so they show at the same point on the horizon vane and sets the sighting vane (C) to align his line of sight with the horizon. The altitude of the sun is the angle between the shadow vane and the sighting vane (B-A-C).

== Solar almucantar ==
The almucantar plane that contains the Sun is used to characterize multiple scattering of aerosols. Measurements are carried out rapidly at several angles at both sides of the Sun using a spectroradiometer or a photometer. There are several models to obtain aerosol properties from the solar almucantar. The most relevant were developed by Oleg Dubovik and used in the NASA AERONET network, and by Teruyuki Nakajima (named SkyRad.pack).

== See also ==
- Circle of equal altitude
