= Navigational triangle =

Spherical triangle used in astronavigation

The navigational triangle or PZX triangle is a spherical triangle used in astronavigation to determine the observer's position on the globe. It is composed of three reference points on the celestial sphere:

- P is the Celestial Pole (either North or South). It is a fixed point.
- Z is the observer's zenith, or their position on the celestial sphere.
- X is the position of a celestial body, such as the sun, moon, a planet, or a star.

The position of Z or X is described via its declination—the angular distance north or south of the equator (corresponding to its latitude)—and the hour angle—the angle between its meridian and the Greenwich meridian (corresponding to its longitude). If the observer knows the angles subtended by P, Z, and X, they can calculate their position on the globe. By measuring the angle of the celestial body in the sky, the observer can get the local hour angle (LHA) of X, which is the angle subtended at P between Z and X (the angle between the Z and X's meridians) and calculate the longitude by subtracting from the Greenwich hour angle of the celestial body. Finding the latitude requires measuring the vertical angle (altitude) of X from the horizon using a sextant, the declination of X from a reference book, and a set of sight reduction Tables.

The sun, moon, and planets move relative to the celestial sphere, but only the stars' hour angles change with the rotation of the earth, completing a full 360 degrees every sidereal day.

== Gallery ==
PZX triangle with altitude, azimuth, right ascension, hour angle and declination.

RPM triangle. Here "M" is the celestial body ("X") and "R" is the ecliptic north pole; "P" is still the Earth rotational north pole. This is not for navigation, but for showing the difference between astronomical coordinate systems – ecliptic and equatorial in this case.

GPR triangle. "R" is the body in question, "G" is the Earth's north pole, and "P" is the galactic north pole. This is not for navigation, but for showing the difference between astronomical coordinate systems – galactic and equatorial in this case.
