= Sight reduction =

Celestial navigational algorithm

In astronavigation, sight reduction is the process of deriving from a sight (in celestial navigation usually obtained using a sextant) the information needed for establishing a line of position, generally by intercept method.

Sight is defined as the observation of the altitude, and sometimes also the azimuth, of a celestial body for a line of position; or the data obtained by such observation.

The mathematical basis of sight reduction is the circle of equal altitude. The calculation can be done by computer, or by hand via tabular methods and longhand methods.

== Algorithm ==
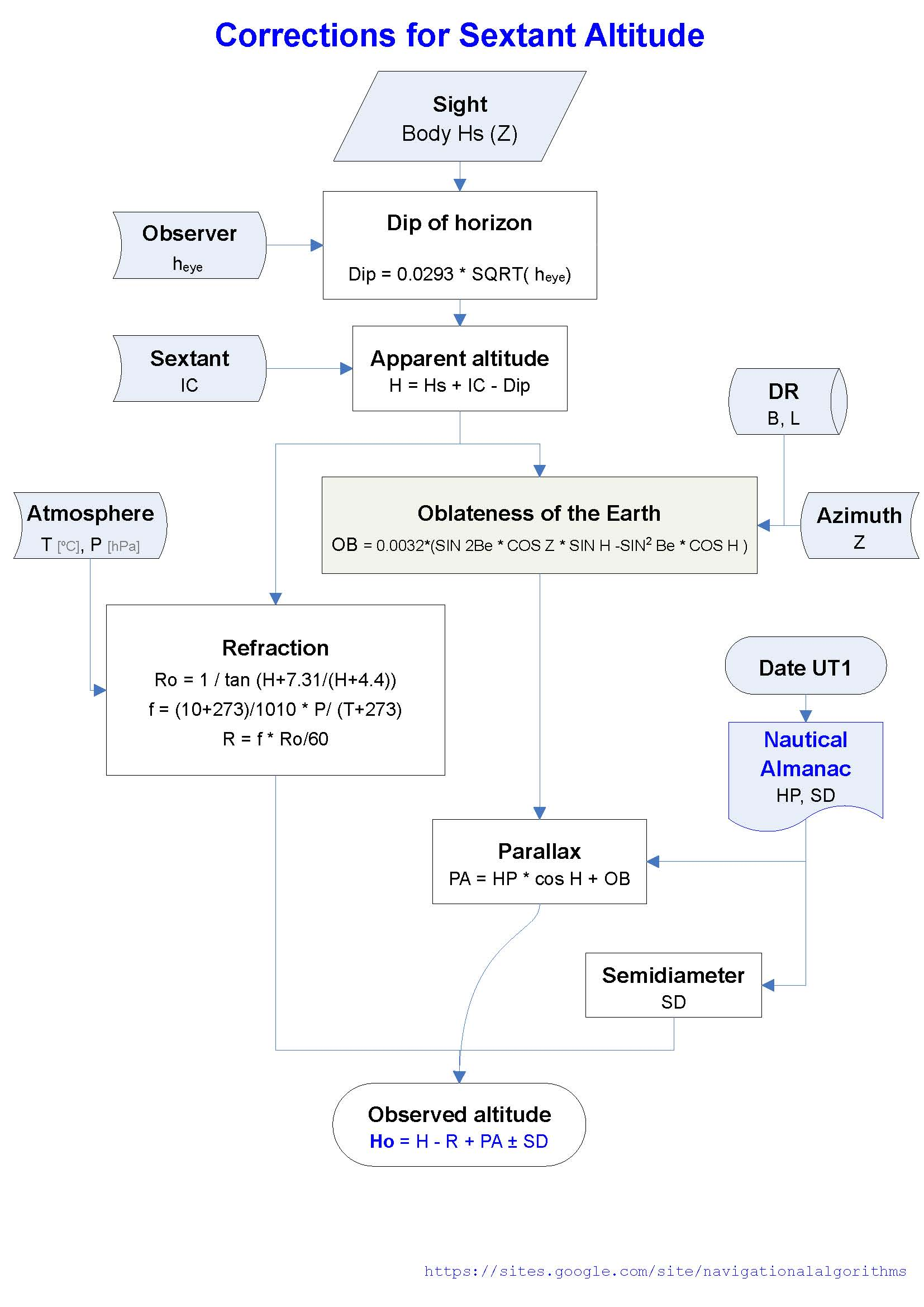
Steps for measuring and correcting Ho using a sextant.

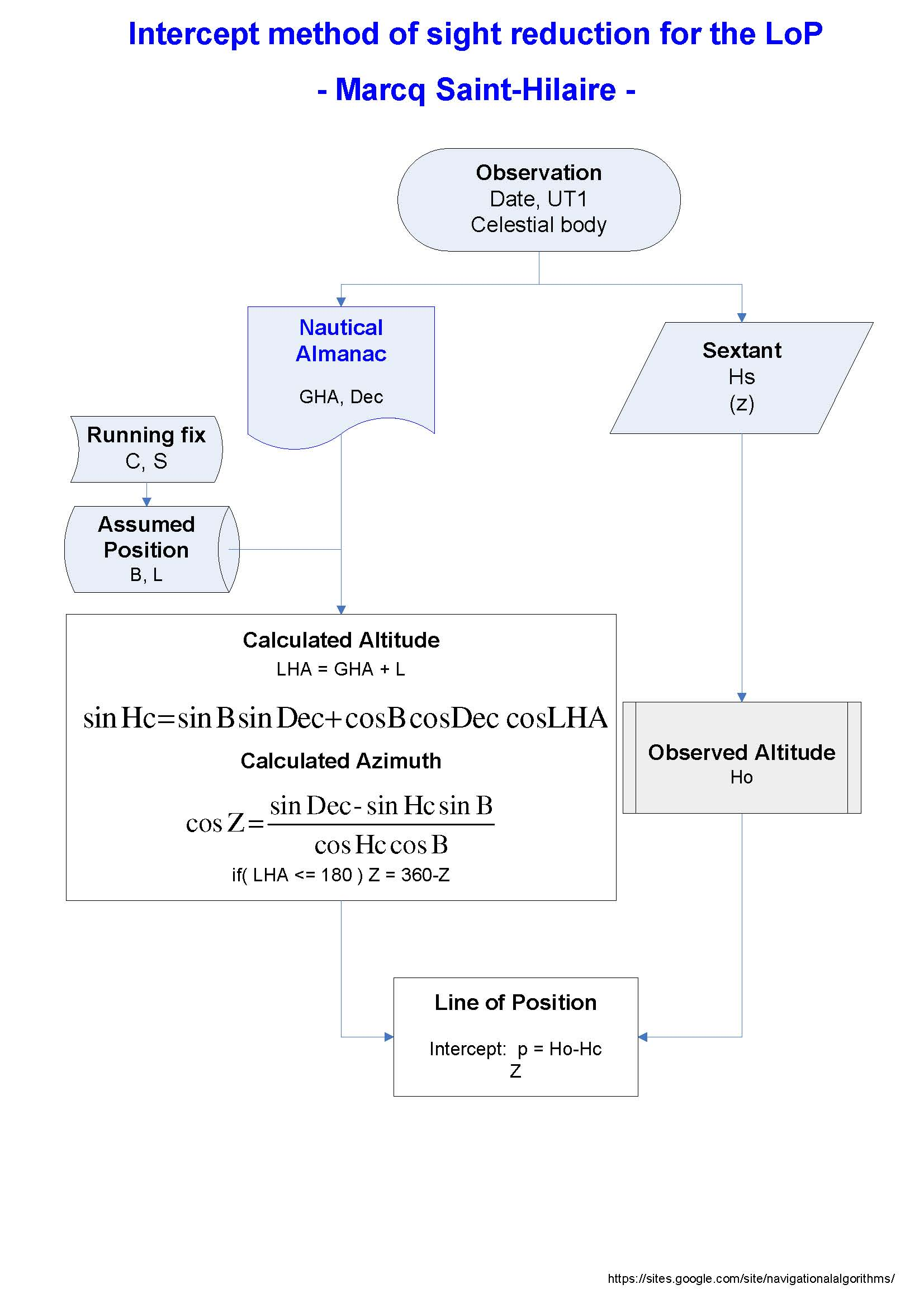
Using Ho, Z, Hc in intercept method.

Given:

- $Lat$, the latitude (North - positive, South - negative), $Lon$ the longitude (East - positive, West - negative), both approximate (assumed);
- $Dec$, the declination of the body observed;
- $GHA$, the Greenwich hour angle of the body observed;
- $LHA = GHA + Lon$, the local hour angle of the body observed.

First calculate the altitude of the celestial body $Hc$ using the equation of circle of equal altitude:

$$\sin(Hc) = \sin(Lat) \cdot \sin(Dec) + \cos(Lat) \cdot \cos(Dec) \cdot \cos(LHA).$$

The azimuth $Z$ or $Zn$ (Zn=0 at North, measured eastward) is then calculated by:

$$\cos(Z) = \frac{\sin(Dec) - \sin(Hc) \cdot \sin(Lat)}{\cos(Hc) \cdot \cos(Lat)} = \frac{\sin(Dec)}{\cos(Hc) \cdot \cos(Lat)} - \tan(Hc) \cdot \tan(Lat).$$

These values are contrasted with the observed altitude $Ho$. $Ho$, $Z$, and $Hc$ are the three inputs to the intercept method (Marcq St Hilaire method), which uses the difference in observed and calculated altitudes to ascertain one's relative location to the assumed point.

== Tabular sight reduction ==
The methods included are:

- The Nautical Almanac Sight Reduction (NASR, originally known as Concise Tables for Sight Reduction or Davies, 1984, 22pg)
- Pub. 249 (formerly H.O. 249, Sight Reduction Tables for Air Navigation, A.P. 3270 in the UK, 1947–53, 1+2 volumes)
- Pub. 229 (formerly H.O. 229, Sight Reduction Tables for Marine Navigation, H.D. 605/NP 401 in the UK, 1970, 6 volumes.
- The variant of HO-229: Sight Reduction Tables for Small Boat Navigation, known as Schlereth, 1983, 1 volume)
- H.O. 214 (Tables of Computed Altitude and Azimuth, H.D. 486 in the UK, 1936–46, 9 vol.)
- H.O. 211 (Dead Reckoning Altitude and Azimuth Table, known as Ageton, 1931, 36pg. And 2 variants of H.O. 211: Compact Sight Reduction Table, also known as Ageton–Bayless, 1980, 9+ pg. S-Table, also known as Pepperday, 1992, 9+ pg.)
- H.O. 208 (Navigation Tables for Mariners and Aviators, known as Dreisonstok, 1928, 113pg.)

== Longhand haversine sight reduction ==
This method is a practical procedure to reduce celestial sights with the needed accuracy, without using electronic tools such as calculator or a computer. And it could serve as a backup in case of malfunction of the positioning system aboard.

=== Doniol ===
The first approach of a compact and concise method was published by R. Doniol in 1955 and involved haversines. The altitude is derived from $\sin (Hc) = n - a \cdot (m + n)$, in which $n = \cos (Lat - Dec)$, $m = \cos (Lat + Dec)$, $a = \operatorname{hav}(LHA)$.

The calculation is:

n = cos(Lat − Dec)
m = cos(Lat + Dec)
a = hav(LHA)
Hc = arcsin(n − a ⋅ (m + n))

=== Ultra compact sight reduction ===
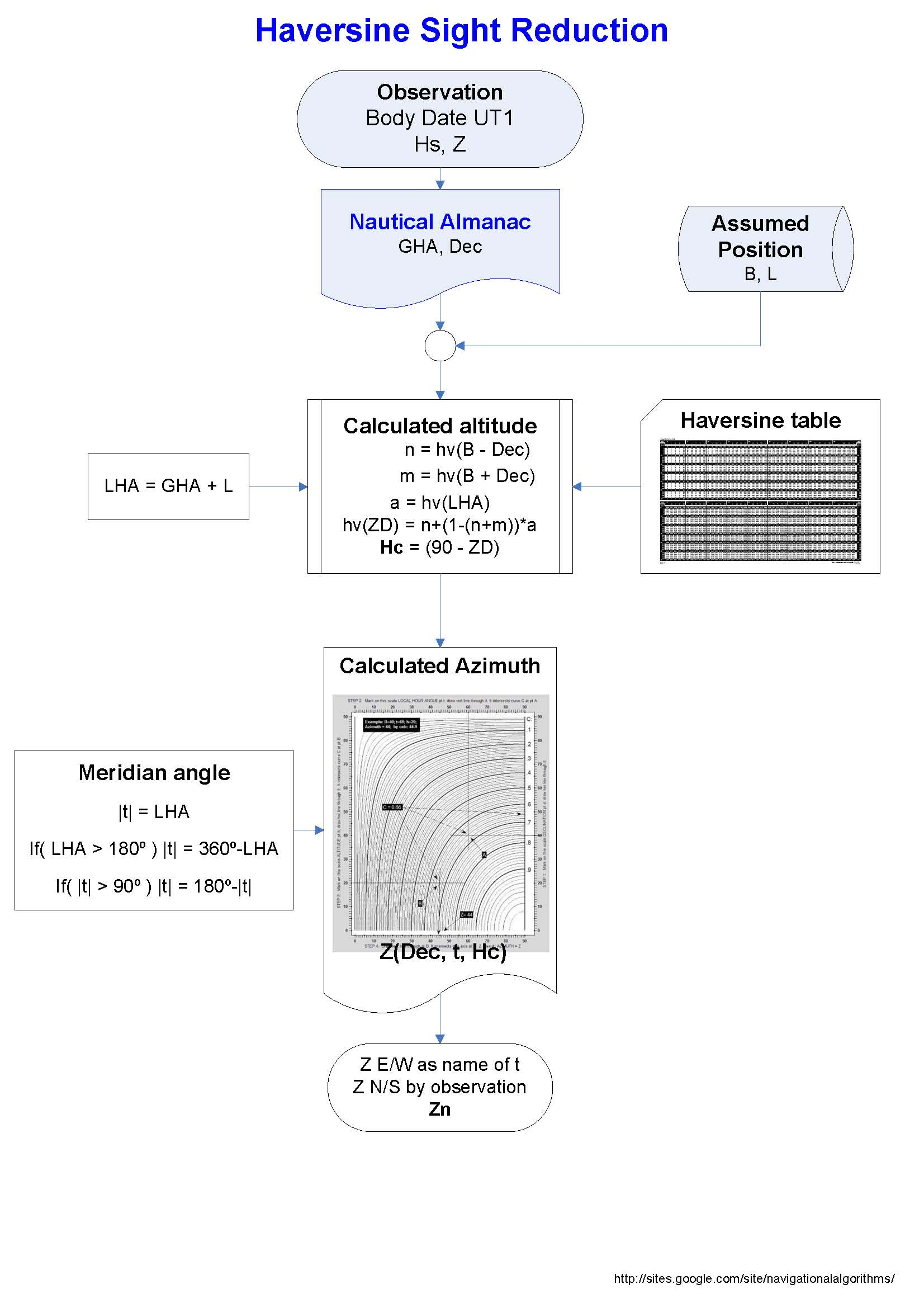
Haversine Sight Reduction algorithm

A practical and friendly method using only haversines was developed between 2014 and 2015, and published in NavList.

A compact expression for the altitude was derived using haversines, $\operatorname{hav}()$, for all the terms of the equation: $\operatorname{hav}(ZD) = \operatorname{hav}(Lat - Dec) + \left( 1 - \operatorname{hav}(Lat - Dec) - \operatorname{hav}(Lat + Dec) \right) \cdot \operatorname{hav}(LHA)$

where $ZD$ is the zenith distance,

$Hc = (90^\circ - ZD)$ is the calculated altitude.

The algorithm if absolute values are used is:

if same name for latitude and declination (both are North or South)
  ''n'' = hav(|<span class="nowrap" style="padding-left:0.1em; padding-right:0.1em;">Lat</span>| − |<span class="nowrap" style="padding-left:0.1em; padding-right:0.1em;">Dec</span>|)
  ''m'' = hav(|<span class="nowrap" style="padding-left:0.1em; padding-right:0.1em;">Lat</span>| + |<span class="nowrap" style="padding-left:0.1em; padding-right:0.1em;">Dec</span>|)
if contrary name (one is North the other is South)
  ''n'' = hav(|<span class="nowrap" style="padding-left:0.1em; padding-right:0.1em;">Lat</span>| + |<span class="nowrap" style="padding-left:0.1em; padding-right:0.1em;">Dec</span>|)
  ''m'' = hav(|<span class="nowrap" style="padding-left:0.1em; padding-right:0.1em;">Lat</span>| − |<span class="nowrap" style="padding-left:0.1em; padding-right:0.1em;">Dec</span>|)
''q'' = ''n'' + ''m''
''a'' = hav(''LHA'')
hav(''ZD'') = ''n'' + ''a'' · (1 − ''q'')
''ZD'' = archav() -> inverse look-up at the haversine tables
''Hc'' = 90° − ''ZD''

For the azimuth a diagram was developed for a faster solution without calculation, and with an accuracy of 1°.

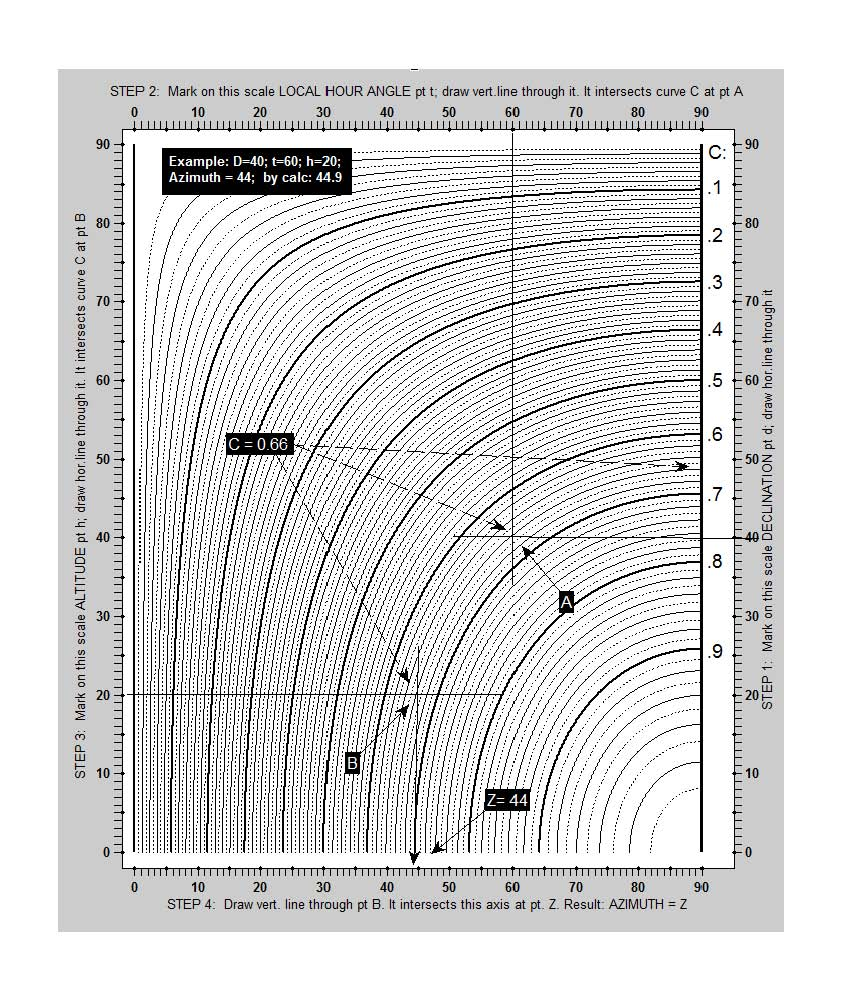
Azimuth diagram by Hanno Ix

This diagram could be used also for star identification.

An ambiguity in the value of azimuth may arise since in the diagram $0^\circ \leqslant Z \leqslant 90^\circ$. $Z$ is E↔W as the name of the meridian angle, but the N↕S name is not determined. In most situations azimuth ambiguities are resolved simply by observation.

When there are reasons for doubt or for the purpose of checking the following formula should be used:

$\operatorname{hav}(Z) = \frac{\operatorname{hav}(90^\circ \pm \vert Dec\vert) - \operatorname{hav}(\vert Lat\vert - Hc)}{1 - \operatorname{hav}(\vert Lat\vert - Hc) - \operatorname{hav}(\vert Lat \vert + Hc)}$

The algorithm if absolute values are used is:

if same name for latitude and declination (both are North or South)
  ''a'' = hav(90° − |<span class="nowrap" style="padding-left:0.1em; padding-right:0.1em;">Dec</span>|)
if contrary name (one is North the other is South)
  ''a'' = hav(90° + |<span class="nowrap" style="padding-left:0.1em; padding-right:0.1em;">Dec</span>|)
''m'' = hav(|<span class="nowrap" style="padding-left:0.1em; padding-right:0.1em;">Lat</span>| + ''Hc'')
''n'' = hav(|<span class="nowrap" style="padding-left:0.1em; padding-right:0.1em;">Lat</span>| − ''Hc'')
''q'' = ''n'' + ''m''
hav(''Z'') = (''a'' − ''n'') / (1 − ''q'')
''Z'' = archav() -> inverse look-up at the haversine tables
if Latitude ''N'':
  if ''LHA'' > 180°, ''Zn'' = ''Z''
  if ''LHA'' < 180°, ''Zn'' = 360° − ''Z''
if Latitude ''S'':
  if ''LHA'' > 180°, ''Zn'' = 180° − ''Z''
  if ''LHA'' < 180°, ''Zn'' = 180° + ''Z''

This computation of the altitude and the azimuth needs a haversine table. For a precision of 1 minute of arc, a four figure table is enough.

==== An example ====
Data:
  ''Lat'' = 34° 10.0′ N (+)
  ''Dec'' = 21° 11.0′ S (−)
  ''LHA'' = 57° 17.0′
Altitude ''Hc'':
  ''a'' = 0.2298
  ''m'' = 0.0128
  ''n'' = 0.2157
  hav(''ZD'') = 0.3930
  ''ZD'' = archav(0.3930) = 77° 39′
  ''Hc'' = 90° - 77° 39′ = 12° 21′
Azimuth ''Zn'':
  ''a'' = 0.6807
  ''m'' = 0.1560
  ''n'' = 0.0358
  hav(''Z'') = 0.7979
  ''Z'' = archav(0.7979) = 126.6°
  Because ''LHA'' < 180° and Latitude is ''North'': ''Zn'' = 360° - ''Z'' = 233.4°

== See also ==
- Navigation
- Celestial navigation
- Circle of equal altitude
- Intercept method
