= Position line =

A position line or line of position (LOP) is a line (or, on the surface of the Earth, a curve) that can be both identified on a chart (nautical chart or aeronautical chart) and translated to the surface of the Earth. The intersection of a minimum of two position lines is a fix that is used in position fixing to identify a navigator's location.

There are several types of position line:

- Compass bearing – the angle between a compass point and the line passing through the compass and the point of interest
- Transit – a line passing through the observer and two other reference points
- Leading line – the line passing through two marks indicating a safe channel
- Leading lights – the line passing through two beacons indicating a safe channel
- Sector lights – the lines created by masked colored lights that indicate a safe channel

== See also ==
- Coordinate line
- Intersection (aeronautics)
- Navigation
- Position circle
- Sight reduction
