= Navigation =

Process of monitoring and controlling the movement of a craft or vehicle

Map reading with a paper trail map

Navigation is a field of study that focuses on the process of monitoring and controlling the movement of a craft or vehicle from one place to another. The field of navigation includes four general categories: land navigation, marine navigation, aeronautic navigation, and space navigation. It is also the term of art used for the specialized knowledge used by navigators to perform navigation tasks. All navigational techniques involve locating the navigator's position compared to known locations or patterns. Navigation, in a broader sense, can refer to any skill or study that involves the determination of position and direction. In this sense, navigation includes orienteering and pedestrian navigation.

For marine navigation, this involves the safe movement of ships, boats and other nautical craft either on or underneath the water using positions from navigation equipment with appropriate nautical charts (electronic and paper). Navigation equipment for ships is mandated under the requirements of the SOLAS Convention, depending on ship size.

For land navigation, this usually involves the movement of persons, animals and vehicles from one place to another by means of navigation equipment (such as a compass or GNSS receivers), maps and visual navigation marks across urban or rural environments. Aeronautic (air) navigation involves piloting an aircraft from one geographic position to another position while monitoring the position as the flight progresses.

== Etymology ==
The term stems from the 1530s, from Latin navigationem (nom. navigatio), from navigatus, pp. of navigare "to sail, sail over, go by sea, steer a ship," from navis "ship" and the root of agere "to drive".

== History ==
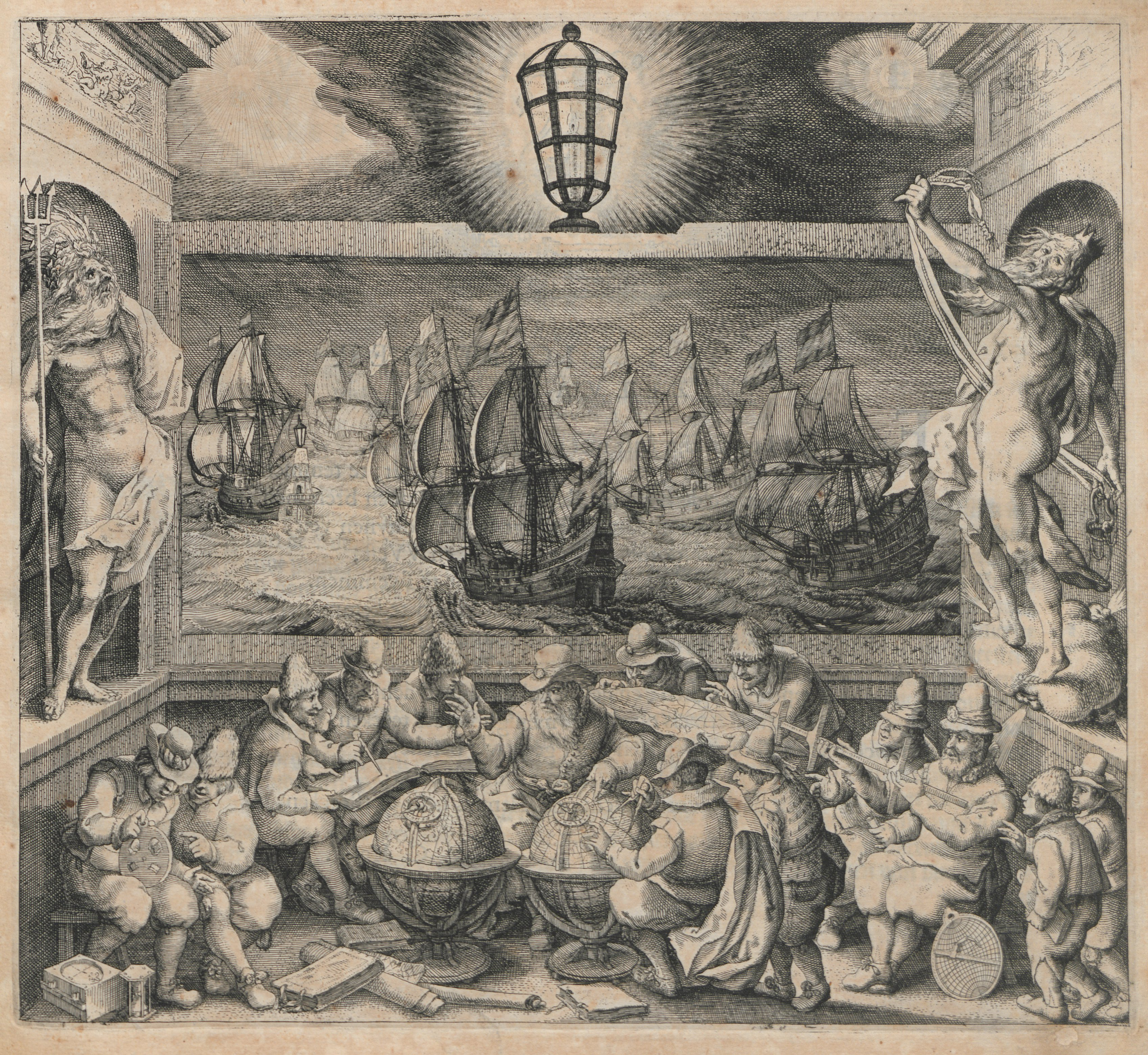
"The light of navigation", Dutch sailing handbook, 1608, showing compass, hourglass, sea astrolabe, terrestrial and celestial globes, divider, Jacob's staff and astrolabe.

Polynesian navigation is probably the earliest form of open-ocean navigation; it was based on memory and observation recorded on scientific instruments like the Marshall Islands Stick Charts of Ocean Swells. Early Pacific Polynesians used the motion of stars, weather, the position of certain wildlife species, or the size of waves to find the path from one island to another. Among the first proper navigational instruments was the compass, with one of the oldest Chinese in origin from the Han dynasty (since c. 206 BC). The compass was later adopted for sea navigation by the Song dynasty Chinese during the 11th century. The first usage of a compass recorded in Western Europe and the Islamic world occurred around 1190.

Maritime navigation using scientific instruments such as the mariner's astrolabe first occurred in the Mediterranean during the Middle Ages. Although land astrolabes were invented in the Hellenistic period and existed in classical antiquity and the Islamic Golden Age, the oldest record of a sea astrolabe is that of Spanish astronomer Ramon Llull dating from 1295. The perfecting of this navigation instrument is attributed to Portuguese navigators during early Portuguese discoveries in the Age of Discovery.

The earliest known description of how to make and use a sea astrolabe comes from Spanish cosmographer Martín Cortés de Albacar's Arte de Navegar (The Art of Navigation) published in 1551, based on the principle of the archipendulum used in constructing the Egyptian pyramids. The first altitude measuring instrument to navigate extensively used at sea was the quadrant. This was reintroduced by Leonardo of Pisa in the 13th century. Its first recorded use was in 1461 by Diogo Gomes. As well as astrolabes and quadrants, the first cross-staff used in navigation was known from the 14th century onwards, believed to have come from early Arab navigators. However, it had many errors and was also difficult to use as it required squinting at the sun. These disadvantages were overcome with the invention of the backstaff in 1595 by John Davis.

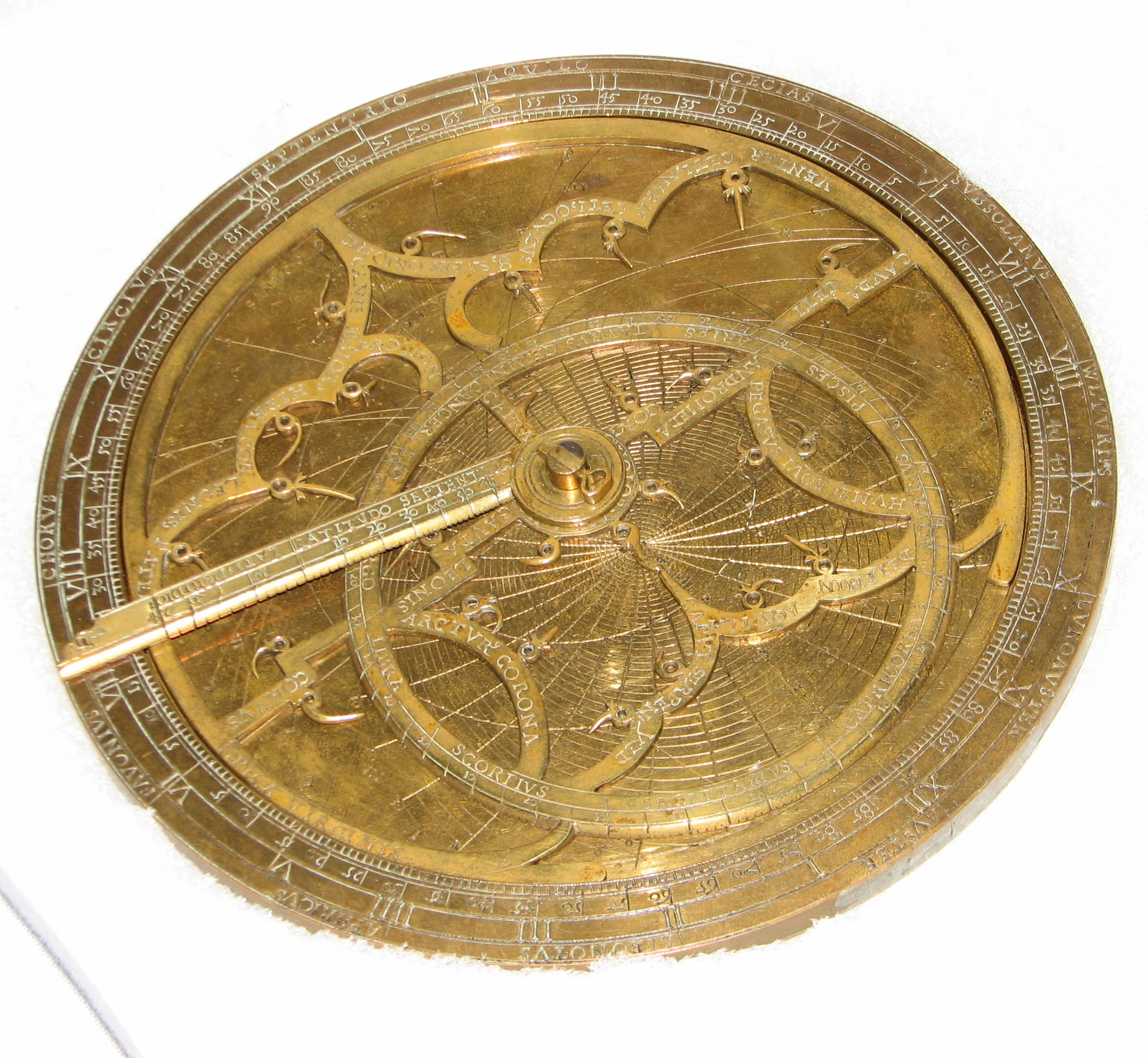
A German 16th century astrolabe

Widespread open-seas navigation using the astrolabe, quadrant, backstaff and the compass started during the Age of Discovery in the 15th century. The Portuguese began systematically exploring the Atlantic coast of Africa from 1418, under the sponsorship of Prince Henry. In 1488 Bartolomeu Dias reached the Indian Ocean by this route. In 1492 the Spanish monarchs funded Christopher Columbus's expedition to sail west to reach the Indies by crossing the Atlantic, which resulted in the Discovery of the Americas.

In 1498, a Portuguese expedition commanded by Vasco da Gama reached India by sailing around Africa, opening up direct trade with Asia. Soon, the Portuguese sailed further eastward, to the Spice Islands in 1512, landing in China one year later. The first circumnavigation of the earth was completed in 1522 with the Magellan-Elcano expedition, a Spanish voyage of discovery led by Portuguese explorer Ferdinand Magellan and completed by Spanish navigator Juan Sebastián Elcano after the former's death in the Philippines in 1521.

For sailing ships, other developments took place with charting and methods to record courses. One of the oldest surviving marine charts is the Carta Pisana, drawn on a sheepskin, dating to 1275. On land, improvements in the production of maps led to improved navigation by armies, traders and other travellers. For sailing ships, navigation by dead reckoning requires frequent recording of course changes and the ship tacks with the wind. To prevent paper charts, which were expensive and in the early days, rare, from being worn out, other methods were used, including the Traverse board and traverse tables (the oldest traverse tables, dates back to 1428). Quadrants were further developed by inventors such as Robert Hooke, Isaac Newton and John Hadley leading to the invention of the octant.

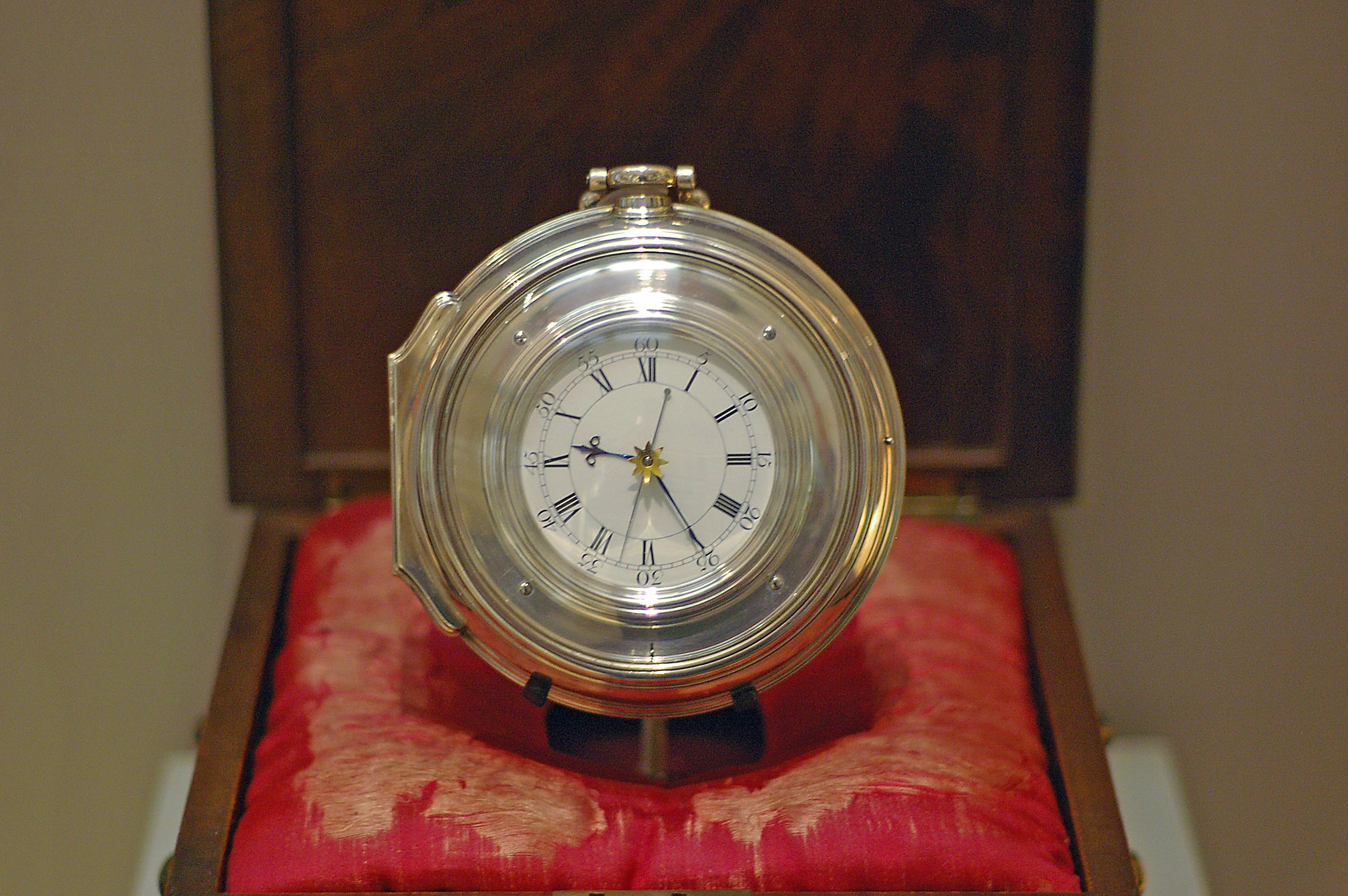
Harrison's Chronometer H5 of 1772, now on display at the Science Museum, London

Developments in mathematics were also important in the history of navigation. These include initially meridional parts, then developments in spherical trigonometry and logarithms enabled navigators from the 1700s onwards to navigate more accurately. On land, mathematical and new instruments led to developments in Surveying and triangulation which further improved maps, as well as the construction of better roads, paths, canals and eventually railways. Development of an accurate marine chronometer under John Harrison and others ensured accurate timekeeping for calculating longitude.

Further improvements in ocean navigation led to the first proper sextant in 1757, the parts and usage developed by various inventors including Pierre Vernier and John Campbell. Methods for calculation with sextant and chronometer evolved over time, beginning with the Duller method (1728) but reached their most accessible with the Douwes method (1821), the Sumner method (1837), modified by Henry Raper (1844) and the Marc St Hilaire or intercept method (1877). Modifications to the magnetic compass and better methods of determining course were also important, include developments in the compass by Matthew Flinders, Lord Kelvin and others.

The sextant, together with the chronometer, compass and astronomical calculations became the most widely used methods of maritime navigation until developments in the 20th century with radio-navigation and gyrocompasses. These were superseded with the advent of computers, electronic calculators and later satellite navigation in the 20th century. On land, the development of handheld GPS occurred in the 1980s and with the advent of smartphones, with in-build compassess and satellite receivers, navigation is now widely achieved through technology globally.

== Basic concepts ==
In terrestrial navigation, the location of a person, ship, plane, etc is defined as a position using a reference point/coordinates (see Cartesian coordinate system). Positions can either be referenced as latitude/longitude or a distance and direction from a fixed reference point (bearing). Lines of position can be derived from a variety of methods and equipment. By determining and monitoring positions it is possible to find and direct a person, ship, plane, etc in a scientific way from one place to another. This often involves the use of maps or charts from which if desired, courses can be calculated or followed depending on the projection or methods used (Rhumb line, Great circle, etc).

=== Latitude ===
Roughly, the latitude of a place on Earth is its angular distance north or south of the equator. Latitude is usually expressed in degrees (marked with °) ranging from 0° at the Equator to 90° at the North and South poles. The latitude of the North Pole is 90° N, and the latitude of the South Pole is 90° S. Mariners calculated latitude in the Northern Hemisphere by sighting the pole star (Polaris) with a sextant and using sight reduction tables to correct for height of eye and atmospheric refraction. The height of Polaris in degrees above the horizon is the latitude of the observer, within a degree or so.

=== Longitude ===
Similar to latitude, the longitude of a place on Earth is the angular distance east or west of the prime meridian or Greenwich meridian. Longitude is usually expressed in degrees (marked with °) ranging from 0° at the Greenwich meridian to 180° east and west. Sydney, for example, has a longitude of about 151° east. New York City has a longitude of 74° west. For most of history, mariners struggled to determine longitude. Longitude can be calculated if the precise time of a sighting is known.

Lacking that, one can use a sextant to take a lunar distance (also called the lunar observation, or "lunar" for short) that, with a nautical almanac, can be used to calculate the time at zero longitude (see Greenwich Mean Time). Reliable marine chronometers were unavailable until the late 18th century and not affordable until the 19th century. For about a hundred years, from about 1767 until about 1850, mariners lacking a chronometer used the method of lunar distances to determine Greenwich time to find their longitude. A mariner with a chronometer could check its reading using a lunar determination of Greenwich time.

=== Loxodrome ===
In navigation, a rhumb line (or loxodrome) is a line crossing all meridians of longitude at the same angle, i.e. a path derived from a defined initial bearing. That is, upon taking an initial bearing, one proceeds along the same bearing, without changing the direction as measured relative to true or magnetic north.

== Methods of navigation ==
Most modern navigation relies primarily on positions determined electronically by receivers collecting information from satellites. Most other modern techniques rely on finding intersecting lines of position or LOP.

A line of position can refer to two different things, either a line on a chart or a line between the observer and an object in real life. A bearing is a measure of the direction to an object. If the navigator measures the direction in real life, the angle can then be drawn on a nautical chart and the navigator will be somewhere on that bearing line on the chart.

In addition to bearings, navigators also often measure distances to objects. On the chart, a distance produces a circle or arc of position. Circles, arcs, and hyperbolae of positions are often referred to as lines of position.

If the navigator draws two lines of position, and they intersect he must be at that position. A fix is the intersection of two or more LOPs.

If only one line of position is available, this may be evaluated against the dead reckoning position to establish an estimated position.

Lines or circles of position can be derived from a variety of sources:

- celestial observation (a short segment of the circle of equal altitude, but generally represented as a line),
- terrestrial range (natural or man made) when two charted points are observed to be in line with each other,
- compass bearings to a charted object,
- radar range to a charted object,
- on certain coastlines, a depth sounding from echo sounder or hand lead line.

There are some methods seldom used today such as the maritime method of "dipping a light" to calculate the geographic range from observer to lighthouse, where the height of the lighthouse is known, from a list of lights or from a chart.

Methods of navigation have changed through history. Each new method has enhanced the mariner's ability to complete his voyage. One of the most important judgments the navigator must make is the best method to use. Some types of navigation are depicted in the table.

Illustration	Description	Application
Traditional navigation methods include:
	In marine navigation, dead reckoning or DR, in which one advances a prior position using the ship's course and speed. The new position is called a DR position. It is generally accepted that only course and speed determine the DR position. Correcting the DR position for leeway, current effects, and steering error result in an estimated position or EP. An inertial navigator develops an extremely accurate EP.	Used at all times.
	In marine navigation, pilotage involves navigating in restricted/coastal waters with frequent determination of position relative to geographic and hydrographic features.	When within sight of land.
	Land navigation is the discipline of following a route through terrain on foot or by vehicle, using maps with reference to terrain, a compass, and other basic navigational tools and/or using landmarks and signs. Wayfinding is the more basic form.	Used at all times.
	Celestial navigation involves reducing celestial measurements to lines of position using tables, spherical trigonometry, and almanacs. It is primarily used at sea but can also be used on land.	Used primarily as a backup to satellite and other electronic systems in the open ocean.
Electronic navigation covers any method of position fixing using electronic means, including:
	Radio navigation uses radio waves to determine position by either radio direction finding systems or hyperbolic systems, such as Decca, Omega and LORAN-C.	Availability has declined due to the development of accurate GNSS.
	Radar navigation uses radar to determine the distance from or bearing of objects whose position is known. This process is separate from radar's use as a collision avoidance system.	Primarily when within radar range of land.
	Satellite navigation uses a Global Navigation Satellite System (GNSS) to determine position.	Used in all situations.

The practice of navigation usually involves a combination of these different methods.

=== Mental navigation checks ===
By mental navigation checks, a pilot or a navigator estimates tracks, distances, and altitudes which will then help the pilot avoid gross navigation errors.

=== Piloting ===
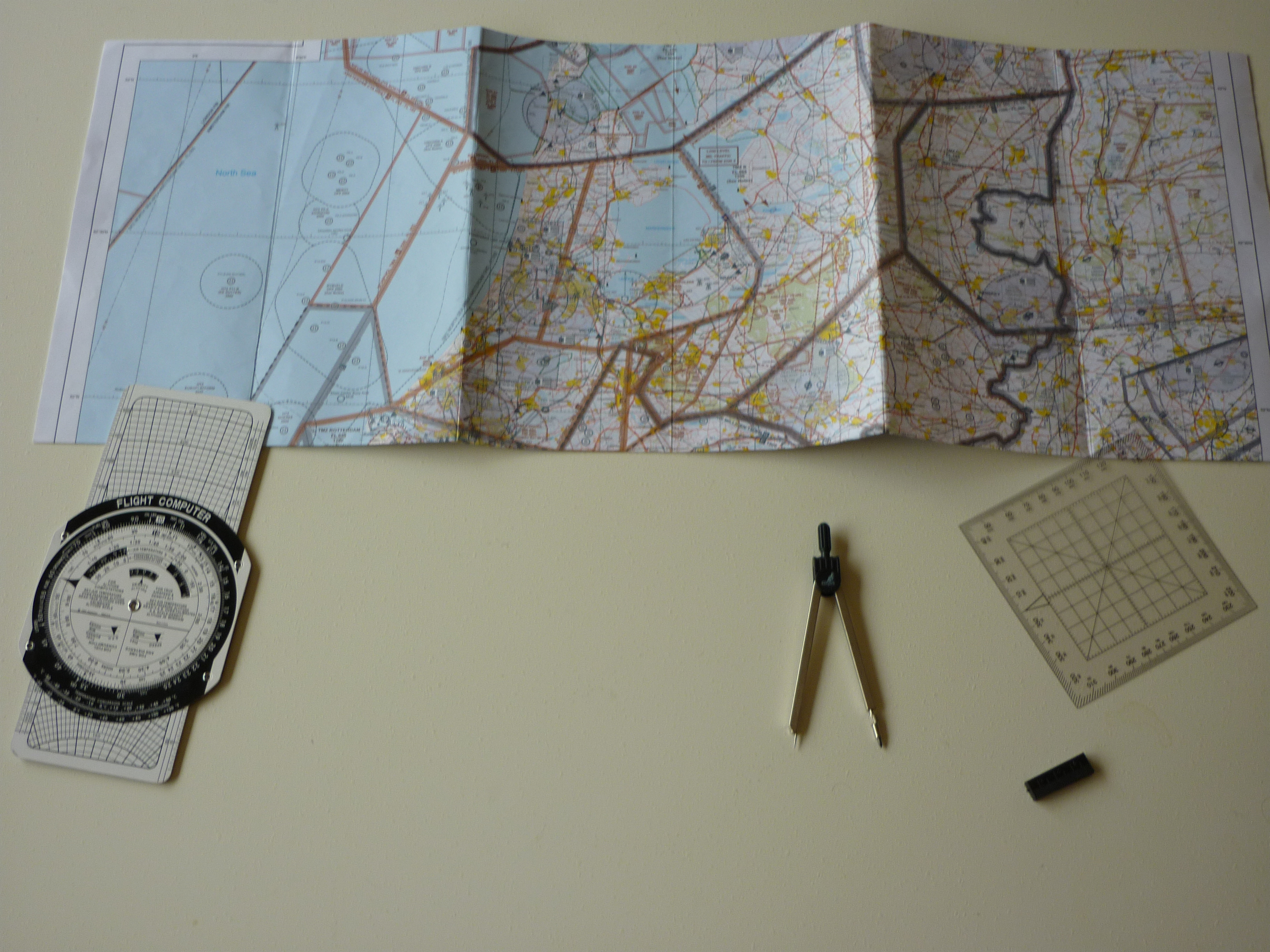
Manual navigation through Dutch airspace

Piloting (also called pilotage) involves navigating an aircraft by visual reference to landmarks, or a water vessel in restricted waters and fixing its position as precisely as possible at frequent intervals. More so than in other phases of navigation, proper preparation and attention to detail are important. Procedures vary from vessel to vessel, and between military, commercial, and private vessels.

As pilotage takes place in shallow waters, it typically involves following courses to ensure sufficient under keel clearance, ensuring a sufficient depth of water below the hull as well as a consideration for squat. It may also involve navigating a ship within a river, canal or channel in close proximity to land.

A military navigation team will nearly always consist of several people. A military navigator might have bearing takers stationed at the gyro repeaters on the bridge wings for taking simultaneous bearings, while the civilian navigator on a merchant ship or leisure craft must often take and plot their position themselves, typically with the aid of electronic position fixing. While the military navigator will have a bearing book and someone to record entries for each fix, the civilian navigator will simply pilot the bearings on the chart as they are taken and not record them at all.

If the ship is equipped with an ECDIS, it is reasonable for the navigator to simply monitor the progress of the ship along the chosen track, visually ensuring that the ship is proceeding as desired, checking the compass, sounder and other indicators only occasionally. If a pilot is aboard, as is often the case in the most restricted of waters, his judgement can generally be relied upon, further easing the workload. But should the ECDIS fail, the navigator will have to rely on his skill in the manual and time-tested procedures.

=== Celestial navigation ===
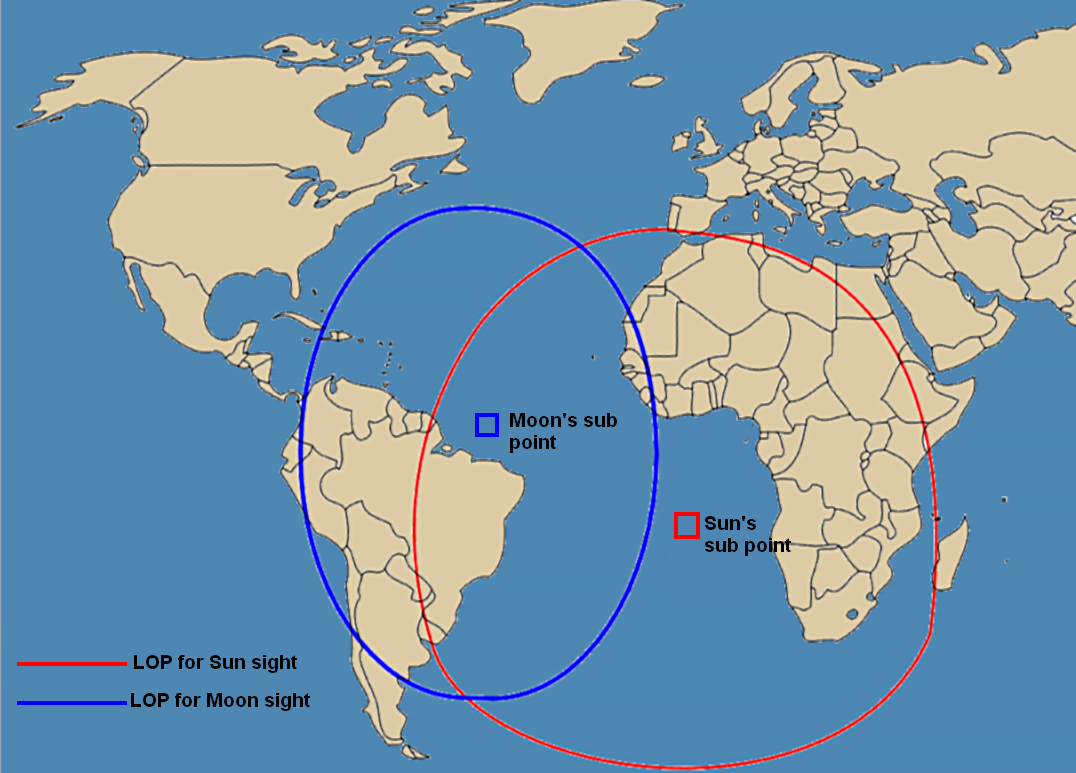
A celestial fix will be at the intersection of two or more circles.

Celestial navigation systems are based on observation of the positions of the Sun, Moon, planets and navigational stars using a sextant or similar navigation instrument. By knowing which point on the rotating Earth a celestial object is above and measuring its height above the observer's horizon, the navigator can determine his distance from that subpoint using mathematical calculation.

A nautical almanac and a source of time, typically a marine chronometer are used to compute the subpoint on Earth a celestial body is over, and a sextant is used to measure the body's angular height above the horizon. That height can then be used to compute distance from the subpoint to create a circular line of position. Alternatively sight reduction tables can be used.

A navigator shoots a number of stars in succession to give a series of overlapping lines of position. Where they intersect is the celestial fix. The Moon and Sun may also be used. The Sun can also be used by itself to shoot a succession of lines of position (best done around local noon) to determine a position. Since the advent of GNSS, celestial navigation is less used for marine and air navigation, though it remains useful as a backup or as another method to cross-check the accuracy of electronic systems, particularly in the open ocean.

==== Marine chronometer ====
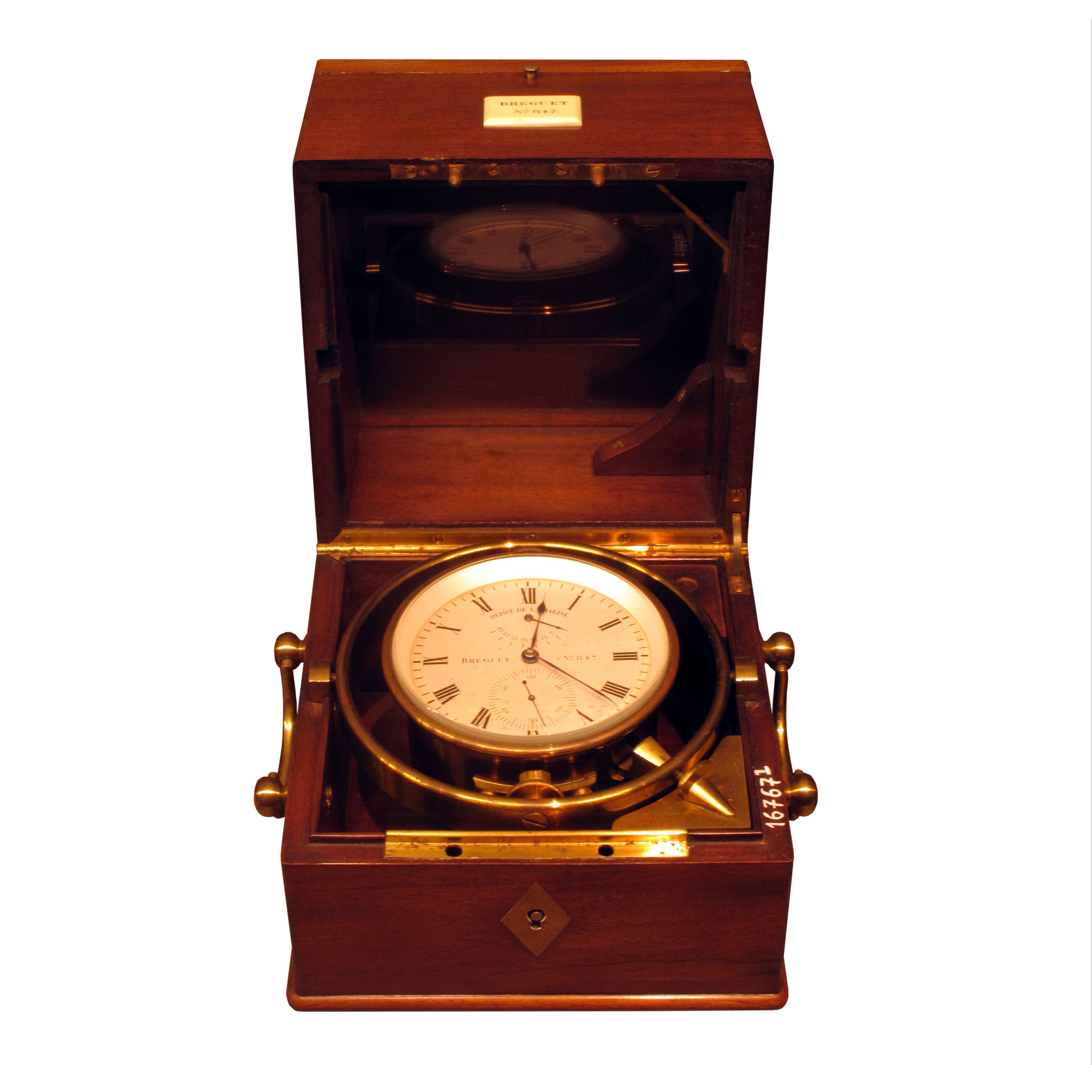
A Breguet marine chronometer

In order to accurately measure longitude, the precise time is required of a sextant sighting (down to the second, if possible) which is then recorded for subsequent calculation. Each second of error is equivalent to 15 seconds of longitude error, which at the equator is a position error of .25 of a nautical mile, about the accuracy limit of manual celestial navigation.

The spring-driven marine chronometer is a precision timepiece used aboard ship to provide accurate time for celestial observations. A chronometer differs from a spring-driven watch principally in that it contains a variable lever device to maintain even pressure on the mainspring, and a special balance designed to compensate for temperature variations.

A spring-driven chronometer is set approximately to Greenwich mean time (GMT) and is not reset until the instrument is overhauled and cleaned, usually at three-year intervals. The difference between GMT and chronometer time is carefully determined and applied as a correction to all chronometer readings. Spring-driven chronometers must be wound at about the same time each day.

Quartz crystal marine chronometers have replaced spring-driven chronometers onboard modern ships because of their greater accuracy. They are maintained on GMT directly from radio time signals. This eliminates chronometer error and watch error corrections. Should the second hand be in error by a readable amount, it can be reset electrically. The basic element for time generation is a quartz crystal oscillator. The quartz crystal is temperature compensated and is hermetically sealed in an evacuated envelope. A calibrated adjustment capability is provided to adjust for the aging of the crystal.

The chronometer is typically designed to operate for a minimum of one year on a single set of batteries. Observations may be timed and ship's clocks set with a comparing watch, which is set to chronometer time and taken to the bridge wing for recording sight times. In practice, a wrist watch coordinated to the nearest second with the chronometer will be adequate. A stop watch, either spring wound or digital, may also be used for celestial observations. In this case, the watch is started at a known GMT by chronometer, and the elapsed time of each sight added to this to obtain GMT of the sight. All chronometers and watches should be checked regularly with a radio time signal. Times and frequencies of radio time signals are listed in publications such as Radio Navigational Aids.

==== The marine sextant ====
The marine sextant is used to measure the elevation of celestial bodies above the horizon.

The second critical component of celestial navigation is to measure the angle formed at the observer's eye between the celestial body and the sensible horizon. The sextant, an optical instrument, is used to perform this function. The sextant consists of two primary assemblies. The frame is a rigid triangular structure with a pivot at the top and a graduated segment of a circle, referred to as the "arc", at the bottom.

The second component is the index arm, which is attached to the pivot at the top of the frame. At the bottom is an endless vernier which clamps into teeth on the bottom of the "arc". The optical system consists of two mirrors and, generally, a low power telescope. One mirror, referred to as the "index mirror" is fixed to the top of the index arm, over the pivot. As the index arm is moved, this mirror rotates, and the graduated scale on the arc indicates the measured angle ("altitude").

The second mirror, referred to as the "horizon glass", is fixed to the front of the frame. One half of the horizon glass is silvered and the other half is clear. Light from the celestial body strikes the index mirror and is reflected to the silvered portion of the horizon glass, then back to the observer's eye through the telescope. The observer manipulates the index arm so the reflected image of the body in the horizon glass is just resting on the visual horizon, seen through the clear side of the horizon glass.

There are three main errors that must be corrected in order to each usage for navigation. The main errors are perpendicular error, side error and index error. Adjustment of the sextant consists of checking and aligning all the optical elements to eliminate the overall "index error" (or index correction). Index correction should be checked, using the horizon or more preferably a star, each time the sextant is used. The practice of taking celestial observations from the deck of a rolling ship, often through cloud cover and with a hazy horizon, is by far the most challenging part of celestial navigation.

==== Bubble octant ====
Until the widespread usage of technologies such as inertial navigation systems, VHF omnidirectional range and GNSS, air navigators used the Bubble octant or bubble sextant. Using this instrument to take sights, mathematical calculations could then be carried out to determine the past position of the aircraft.

=== Inertial navigation ===
Inertial navigation system (INS) is a dead reckoning type of navigation system that computes its position based on motion sensors. Before actually navigating, the initial latitude and longitude and the INS's physical orientation relative to the Earth (e.g., north and level) are established. After alignment, an INS receives impulses from motion detectors that measure (a) the acceleration along three axes (accelerometers), and (b) rate of rotation about three orthogonal axes (gyroscopes). These enable an INS to continually and accurately calculate its current latitude and longitude (and often velocity).

Advantages over other navigation systems are that, once aligned, an INS does not require outside information. An INS is not affected by adverse weather conditions and it cannot be detected or jammed. Its disadvantage is that since the current position is calculated solely from previous positions and motion sensors, its errors are cumulative, increasing at a rate roughly proportional to the time since the initial position was input. Inertial navigation systems must therefore be frequently corrected with a location 'fix' from some other type of navigation system.

The first inertial system is considered to be the V-2 guidance system deployed by the Germans in 1942. However, inertial sensors are traced to the early 19th century. The advantages INSs led their use in aircraft, missiles, surface ships and submarines. For example, the U.S. Navy developed the Ships Inertial Navigation System (SINS) during the Polaris missile program to ensure a reliable and accurate navigation system to initial its missile guidance systems. Inertial navigation systems were in wide use until satellite navigation systems (GPS) became available. INSs are still in common use on submarines (since GPS reception or other fix sources are not possible while submerged) and long-range missiles but are not now widely found elsewhere.

==== Gravity-aided navigation ====
Gravity-aided navigation originated in the 1990s and provides a technology to obtain a position fix for navigation. It utilises the concept that an onboard sensor measures elements of the gravitational vector while the platform is in motion and then these measurements are referenced to a map of the Earth's gravitational field to determine a position.

==== Space navigation ====
Not to be confused with satellite navigation, which depends upon satellites to function, space navigation refers to the navigation of spacecraft themselves. This has historically been achieved (during the Apollo program) via a navigational computer, an Inertial navigation system, and via celestial inputs entered by astronauts which were recorded by sextant and telescope. Space rated navigational computers, like those found on Apollo and later missions, are designed to be hardened against possible data corruption from radiation. Navigation in space has three main components: the use of a suitable reference trajectory which describes the planned flight path of the spacecraft, monitoring the actual spacecraft position while the mission is in flight (orbit determination) and creating maneuvers to bring the spacecraft back to the reference trajectory as required (flight path control).

Another possibility that has been explored for deep space navigation is Pulsar navigation, which compares the X-ray bursts from a collection of known pulsars in order to determine the position of a spacecraft. This method has been tested by multiple space agencies, such as NASA and ESA.

=== Electronic navigation ===
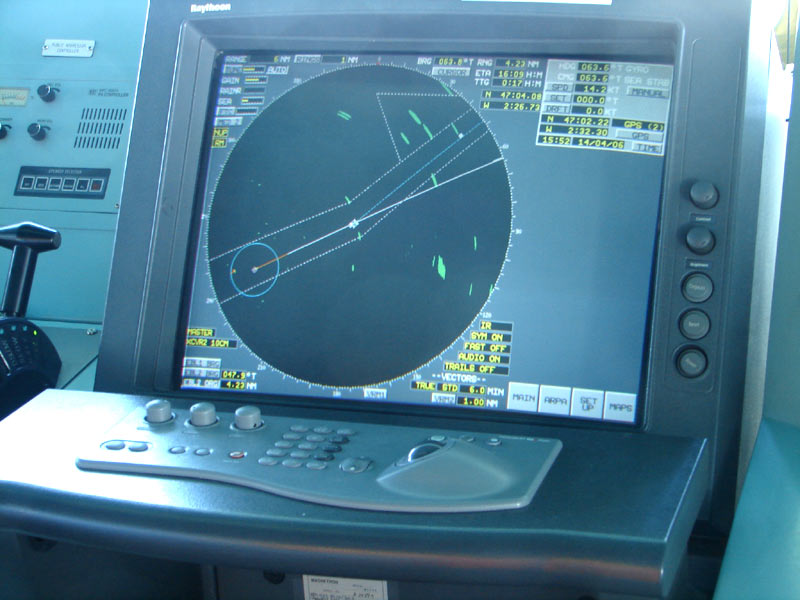
Radar ranges and bearings can be used to determine a position.

==== Radar navigation ====
Radars can be used for navigation and marine radars are commonly fitted to ships for navigation at sea. Radar is an effective aid to navigation because it provides ranges and bearings to objects within range of the radar scanner. When a vessel (ship or boat) is within radar range of land or fixed objects (such as special radar aids to navigation and navigation marks) the navigator can take distances and angular bearings to charted objects and use these to establish arcs of position and lines of position on a chart.

A fix consisting of only radar information is called a radar fix. Types of radar fixes include "range and bearing to a single object," "two or more bearings," "tangent bearings," and "two or more ranges." Radar can also be used with ECDIS as a means of position fixing with the radar image or distance/bearing overlaid onto an Electronic nautical chart.

Parallel indexing is a technique defined by William Burger in the 1957 book The Radar Observer's Handbook. This technique involves creating a line on the screen that is parallel to the ship's course, but offset to the left or right by some distance. This parallel line allows the navigator to maintain a given distance away from hazards. The line on the radar screen is set to a specific distance and angle, then the ship's position relative to the parallel line is observed. This can provide an immediate reference to the navigator as to whether the ship is on or off its intended course for navigation.

Other techniques that are less used in general navigation have been developed for special situations. One, known as the "contour method," involves marking a transparent plastic template on the radar screen and moving it to the chart to fix a position. Another special technique, known as the Franklin Continuous Radar Plot Technique, involves drawing the path a radar object should follow on the radar display if the ship stays on its planned course. During the transit, the navigator can check that the ship is on track by checking that the pip lies on the drawn line.

==== Radio navigation ====

A radio direction finder or RDF is a device for finding the direction to a radio source. Due to radio's ability to travel very long distances "over the horizon", it makes a particularly good navigation system for ships and aircraft that might be flying at a distance from land. RDFs works by rotating a directional antenna and listening for the direction in which the signal from a known station comes through most strongly. This sort of system was widely used in the 1930s and 1940s. RDF antennas are easy to spot on German World War II aircraft, as loops under the rear section of the fuselage, whereas most US aircraft enclosed the antenna in a small teardrop-shaped fairing.

In navigational applications, RDF signals are provided in the form of radio beacons, the radio version of a lighthouse. The signal is typically a simple AM broadcast of a morse code series of letters, which the RDF can tune in to see if the beacon is "on the air". Most modern detectors can also tune in any commercial radio stations, which is particularly useful due to their high power and location near major cities.

Decca, OMEGA, and LORAN-C are three similar hyperbolic navigation systems. Decca was a hyperbolic low frequency radio navigation system, also known as multilateration, that was first deployed during World War II when the Allied forces needed a system which could be used to achieve accurate landings. As with Loran C, its primary use was for ship navigation in coastal waters. Fishing vessels were major post-war users, but it was also used on aircraft, including a very early (1949) application of moving-map displays. The system was deployed in the North Sea and was used by helicopters operating to oil platforms.

The OMEGA Navigation System was the first truly global radio navigation system for aircraft, operated by the United States in cooperation with six partner nations. OMEGA was developed by the United States Navy for military aviation users. It was approved for development in 1968 and promised a true worldwide oceanic coverage capability with only eight transmitters and the ability to achieve a four-mile (6 km) accuracy when fixing a position. Initially, the system was to be used for navigating nuclear bombers across the North Pole to Russia. Later, it was found useful for submarines. Due to the success of the Global Positioning System the use of Omega declined during the 1990s, to a point where the cost of operating Omega could no longer be justified. Omega was terminated on September 30, 1997, and all stations ceased operation.

LORAN is a terrestrial navigation system using low frequency radio transmitters that use the time interval between radio signals received from three or more stations to determine the position of a ship or aircraft. The current version of LORAN in common use is LORAN-C, which operates in the low frequency portion of the EM spectrum from 90 to 110 kHz. Many nations are users of the system, including the United States, Japan, and several European countries. Russia uses a nearly exact system in the same frequency range, called CHAYKA. LORAN use is in steep decline, with GPS being the primary replacement. There are attempts to enhance and re-popularize LORAN. LORAN signals are less susceptible to interference and can penetrate better into foliage and buildings than GPS signals.

==== Satellite navigation ====
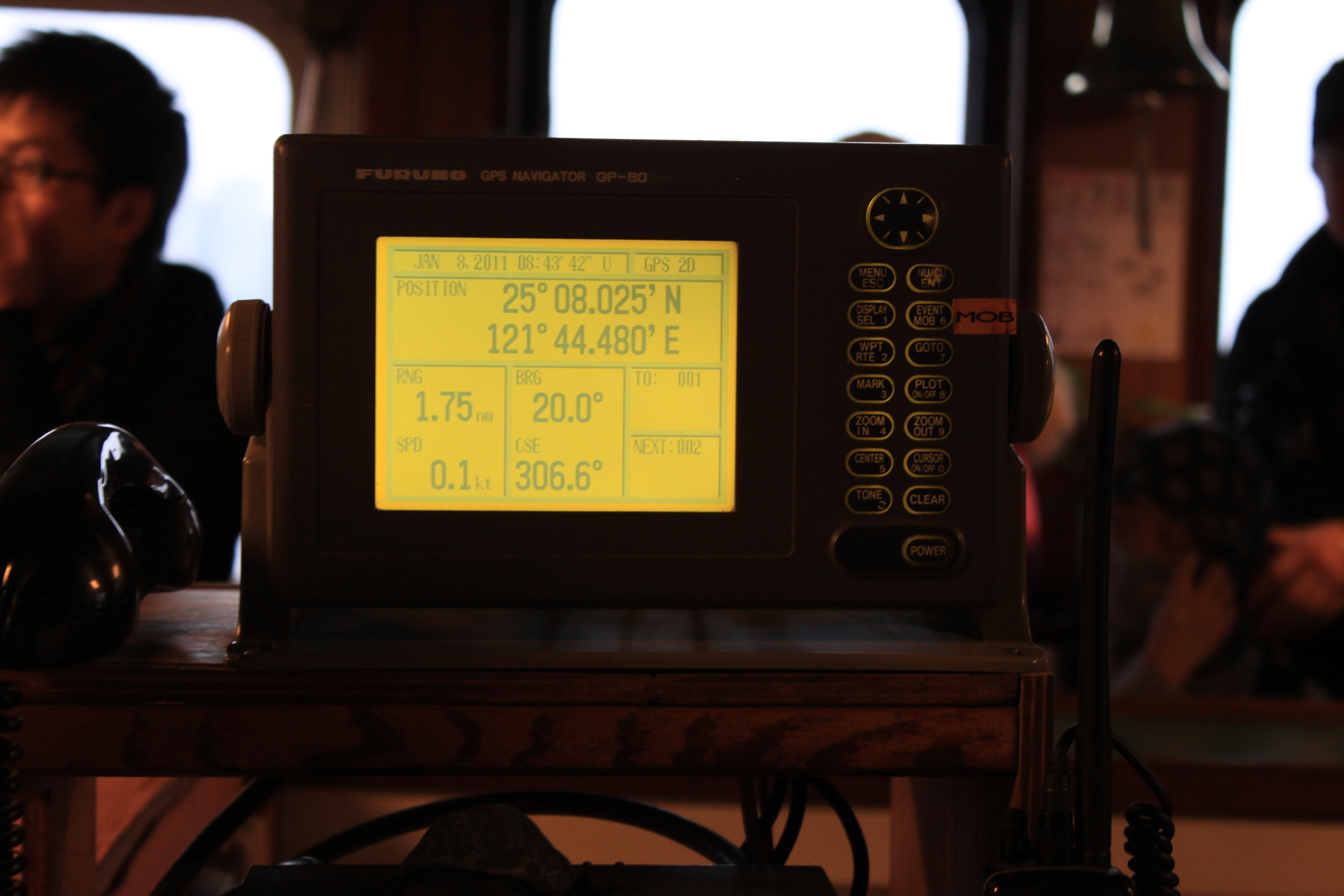
A ship's Furuno GNSS receiver showing a GPS position

A GNSS allow small electronic receivers to determine their location (longitude, latitude, and altitude) within a few meters using time signals transmitted along a line of sight by radio from satellites. Positions derived can then be used with maps and charts for satellite navigation. Since the first experimental satellite was launched in 1978, GNSS have become an indispensable aid to navigation around the world, and an important tool for map-making and land surveying. GNSS also provides a precise time reference used in many applications including scientific study of earthquakes, and synchronization of telecommunications networks. Global Navigation Satellite System or GNSS is the term for satellite navigation systems that provide positioning with global coverage.

The first system, GPS was developed by the United States Department of Defense and officially named NAVSTAR GPS (NAVigation Satellite Timing And Ranging Global Positioning System). The satellite constellation is managed by the United States Air Force 50th Space Wing. The cost of maintaining the system is approximately US$750 million per year, including the replacement of aging satellites, and research and development. Despite this fact, GPS is free for civilian use as a public good.

With improvements in technology and developments globally, as of 2024, there are several different operational GNSS now available for navigation by the public. These include the United States NAVSTAR Global Positioning System (GPS), the Russian GLONASS, the European Union's Galileo positioning system and the Beidou navigation system of China. The different global systems have varying differences in accuracy but stated positions are normally in the range of between 1 and 10 metres accuracy depending on system and on that system's satellite coverage.

As a result over 100 satellites are in medium Earth orbit, transmitting signals allowing GNSS receivers to determine the receiver's location, speed and direction. There are also several regional GNSS systems available for navigation, including the Indian Regional Navigation Satellite System and the Quasi-Zenith Satellite System. However, not all GNSS receivers are capable of operating with these systems and older GNSS receivers, such as on old ships may not be capable of receiving all of the GNSS now available to users.

Modern smartphones act as personal GNSS navigators for civilians who own them. Overuse of these devices, whether in the vehicle or on foot, can lead to a relative inability to learn about navigated environments, resulting in sub-optimal navigation abilities when and if these devices become unavailable. Typically a compass is also provided to determine direction when not moving.

The increasing prevalence of Global Navigation Satellite System (GNSS) jamming and spoofing has renewed interest in resilient navigation methods that do not rely solely on satellite signals. Modern ships may use integrated navigation architectures combining inertial navigation systems, fibre-optic gyrocompasses, radar, and terrestrial navigation methods to maintain reliable heading and positional awareness during satellite signal disruption.

==== Acoustic navigation ====
Acoustic location is a method of navigation by the use of acoustic positioning systems which determine the position of an object by using sound waves. It is primarily used by submarines and ships fitted with sonar and similar transducer based technologies. Underwater acoustic positioning systems are also commonly used by divers and Remotely operated underwater vehicles, specifically the Long baseline acoustic positioning system, the Short baseline acoustic positioning system and the Ultra-short baseline acoustic positioning system.

== Navigation processes ==
=== Passage planning ===
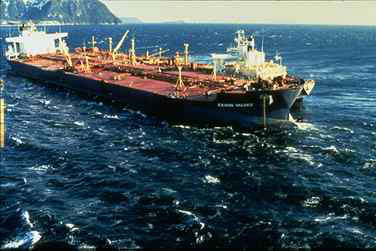
Poor passage planning and deviation from the plan can lead to groundings, ship damage and cargo loss.

Passage planning or voyage planning is a procedure to develop a complete description of vessel's voyage from start to finish. The plan includes leaving the dock and harbor area, the en route portion of a voyage, approaching the destination, and mooring. According to international law, a vessel's captain is legally responsible for passage planning, however on larger vessels, the task will be delegated to the ship's navigator.

Studies show that human error is a factor in 80 percent of navigational accidents and that in many cases the human making the error had access to information that could have prevented the accident. The practice of voyage planning has evolved from penciling lines on nautical charts to a process of risk management.

Passage planning consists of four stages: appraisal, planning, execution, and monitoring, which are specified in International Maritime Organization Resolution A.893(21), Guidelines For Voyage Planning, and these guidelines are reflected in the local laws of IMO signatory countries (for example, Title 33 of the U.S. Code of Federal Regulations), and a number of professional books or publications. There are some fifty elements of a comprehensive passage plan depending on the size and type of vessel.

The appraisal stage deals with the collection of information relevant to the proposed voyage as well as ascertaining risks and assessing the key features of the voyage. This will involve considering the type of navigation required e.g. Ice navigation, the region the ship will be passing through and the hydrographic information on the route. In the next stage, the written plan is created. The third stage is the execution of the finalised voyage plan, taking into account any special circumstances which may arise such as changes in the weather, which may require the plan to be reviewed or altered. The final stage of passage planning consists of monitoring the vessel's progress in relation to the plan and responding to deviations and unforeseen circumstances.

=== Integrated bridge systems ===
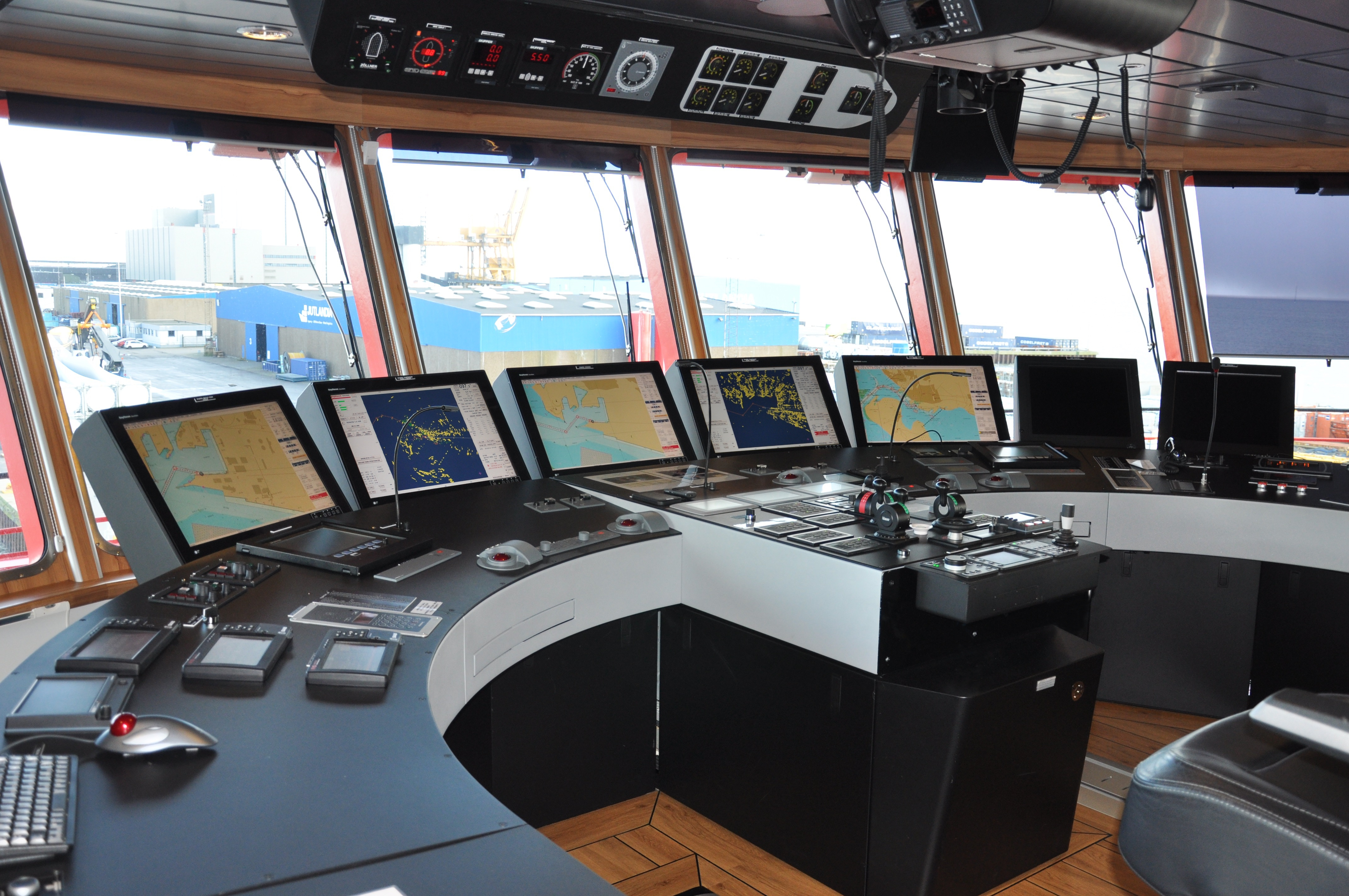
Integrated Bridge System, integrated on an Offshore Service Ship

Electronic integrated bridge concepts are driving future navigation system planning. Integrated systems take inputs from various ship sensors, electronically display positioning information, and provide control signals required to maintain a vessel on a preset course. The navigator becomes a system manager, choosing system presets, interpreting system output, and monitoring vessel response.

Modern commercial and naval vessels increasingly use Integrated Bridge Systems (IBS), which combine radar, Electronic Chart Display and Information Systems (ECDIS), automatic identification systems (AIS), gyrocompasses, autopilot controls, machinery data, and navigation sensors into a unified operator environment. Integrated systems improve situational awareness, reduce bridge workload, and support safer navigation by allowing watchkeepers to access and correlate information from multiple ship systems simultaneously.

In the 2020s, Integrated Bridge Systems evolved to support autonomous-ready vessel operations, open-system interoperability, cyber resilience, and low-emission shipping initiatives. Advanced bridge platforms have been deployed aboard vessels to support voyage efficiency, remote diagnostics, and future autonomous and highly-automated navigation capabilities.

Autonomous and autonomous-ready maritime navigation systems commonly rely on sensor fusion combining radar, AIS, satellite navigation, inertial navigation systems, cameras, and voyage-management software within an integrated bridge architecture.

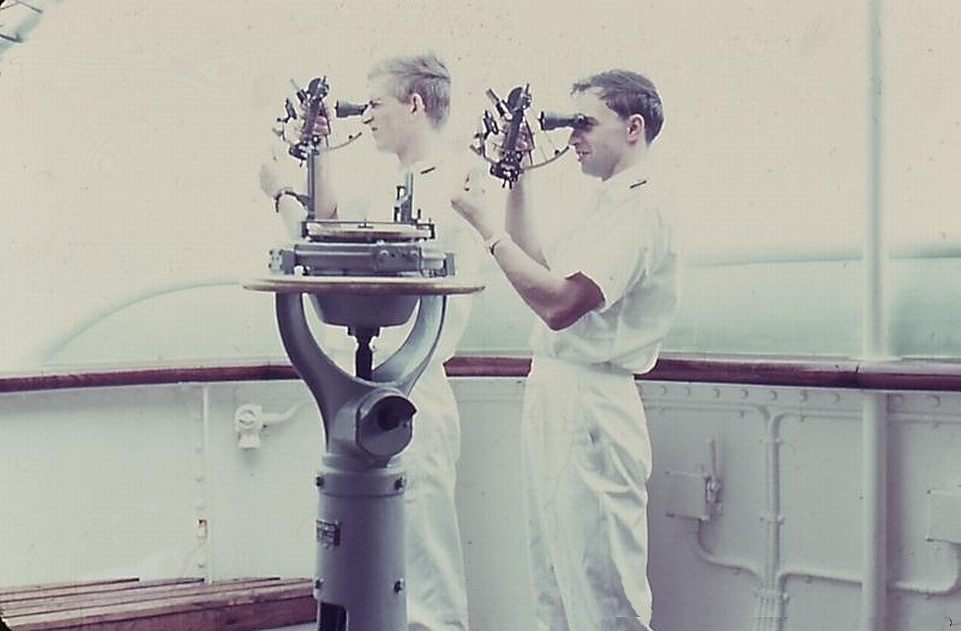
Two ship's officers practicing traditional celestial navigation taking a sunsight by sextant

=== Ships and similar vessels ===
==== One day's work in traditional navigation ====
In traditional marine navigation, one day's work in navigation is a minimal set of tasks consistent with prudent celestial navigation. The definition and processes vary on military and civilian vessels, and from ship to ship, but the traditional method takes a form resembling:

1. Maintain a continuous dead reckoning plot.
2. Take two or more star observations at morning twilight for a celestial fix (prudent to observe six stars).
3. Morning Sun observation. Can be taken on or near prime vertical for longitude, or at any time for a line of position.
4. Determine compass error by azimuth observation of the Sun.
5. Computation of the interval to noon, watch time of local apparent noon, and constants for meridian or ex-meridian sights.
6. Noontime meridian or ex-meridian observation of the Sun for noon latitude line. Running fix or cross with Venus line for noon fix.
7. Noontime determination the day's run and day's set and drift.
8. At least one afternoon Sun line, in case the stars are not visible at twilight.
9. Determine compass error by azimuth observation of the Sun.
10. Take two or more star observations at evening twilight for a celestial fix (prudent to observe six stars).

Navigation on ships is usually always conducted on the bridge. It may also take place in adjacent space, where chart tables and publications are available. Increasingly traditional navigation processes have been replaced with technological processes for marine navigation.

=== Land navigation ===
Navigation for cars and other land-based travel typically uses maps, landmarks, and in recent times computer navigation ("satnav", short for satellite navigation), as well as any means available on water.

Computerized navigation commonly relies on GPS for current location information, a navigational map database of roads and navigable routes, and uses algorithms related to the shortest path problem to identify optimal routes.

Pedestrian navigation is involved in orienteering, land navigation (military), and wayfinding.

=== Underwater navigation ===
Submariners, divers, remotely operated underwater vehicles (ROVs) and other underwater craft carry out underwater navigation by a variety of methods and processes including GNSS, radar navigation and sonar/acoustic position fixing.

=== Artificial intelligence ===
Artificial intelligence can be utilised to assist with planning, problem-serving and decision-making processes in navigation. This includes using AI in navigation systems such as GNSS as well as in general computing to assist with position fixing and monitoring from one position to another such as in vehicles, planes and cars.

== Standards, training and organisations ==
Professional standards for navigation depend on the type of navigation and vary by country. For marine navigation, Merchant Navy deck officers are trained and internationally certified according to the STCW Convention. Leisure and amateur mariners may undertake lessons in navigation at local/regional training schools. Naval officers receive navigation training as part of their naval training.

In land navigation, courses and training is often provided to young persons as part of general or extra-curricular education. Land navigation is also an essential part of army training. Additionally, organisations such as the Scouts and DoE programme teach navigation to their students. Orienteering organisations are a type of sports that require navigational skills using a map and compass to navigate from point to point in diverse and usually unfamiliar terrain whilst moving at speed.

In aviation, pilots undertake air navigation training as part of learning to fly.

Professional organisations also assist to encourage improvements in navigation or bring together navigators in learned environments. The Royal Institute of Navigation (RIN) is a learned society with charitable status, aimed at furthering the development of navigation on land and sea, in the air and in space. It was founded in 1947 as a forum for mariners, pilots, engineers and academics to compare their experiences and exchange information. In the US, the Institute of Navigation (ION) is a non-profit professional organisation advancing the art and science of positioning, navigation and timing.

=== Publications ===
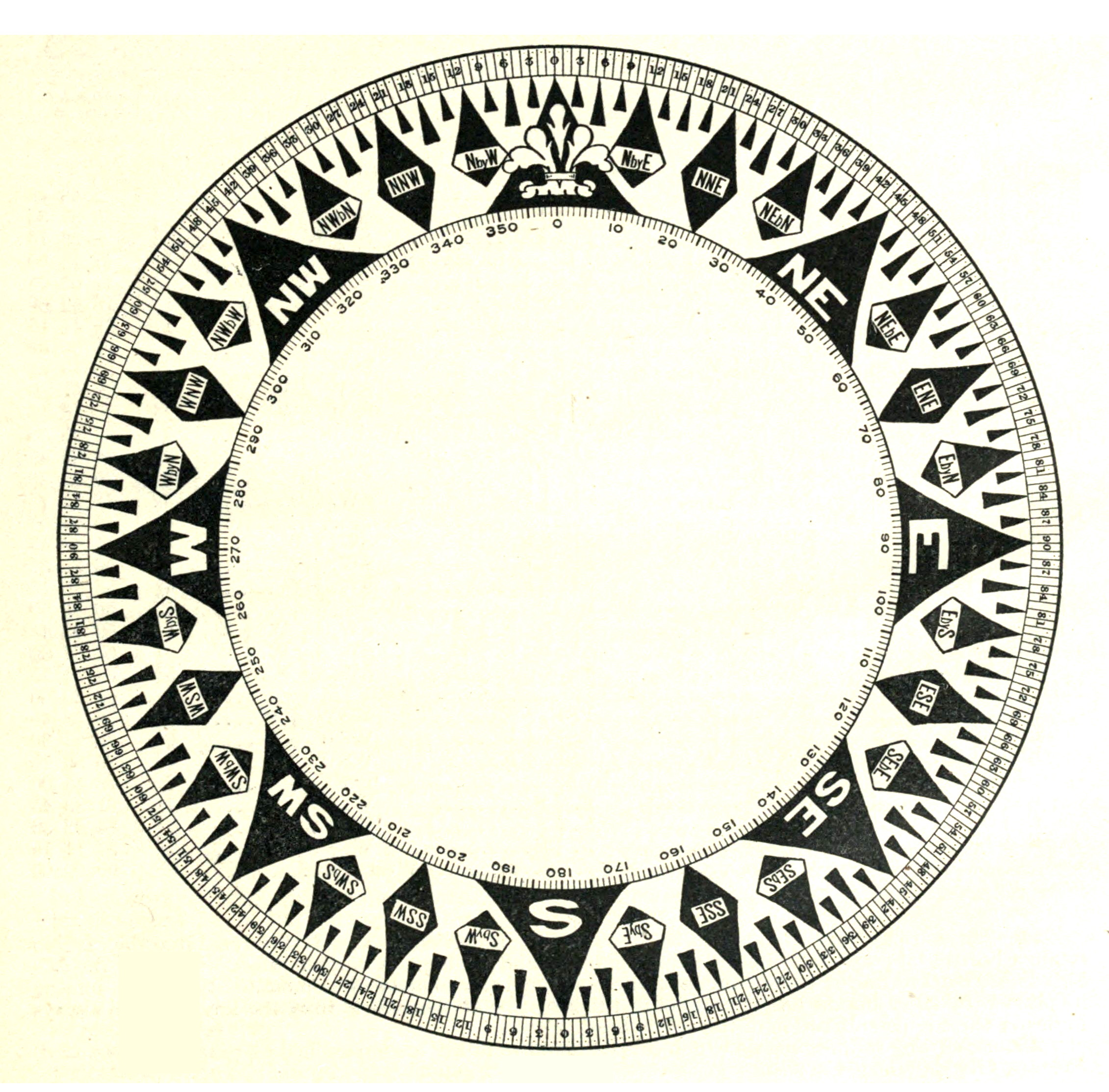
An illustration showing a compass used for navigation from Bowditch's American Practical Navigator

Numerous nautical publications are available on navigation, which are published by professional sources all over the world. In the UK, the United Kingdom Hydrographic Office, the Witherby Publishing Group and the Nautical Institute provide numerous navigational publications, including the comprehensive Admiralty Manual of Navigation.

In the US, Bowditch's American Practical Navigator is a free available encyclopedia of navigation issued by the US Government.

== Navigation in spatial cognition ==
Navigation is an essential everyday activity that involves a series of abilities that help humans and animals to locate, track, and follow paths in order to arrive at different destinations. Navigation, in spatial cognition, allows for acquiring information about the environment by using the body and landmarks of the environment as frames of references to create mental representations of our environment, also known as a cognitive map. Humans navigate by transitioning between different spaces and coordinating both egocentric and allocentric frames of reference.

Navigation can be distinguished into two sptial components: locomotion and wayfinding. Locomotion is the process of movement from one place to another, both in humans and in animals. Locomotion helps you understand an environment by moving through a space in order to create a mental representation of it. Wayfinding is defined as an active process of following or deciding upon a path between one place to another through mental representations. It involves processes such as representation, planning and decision which help to avoid obstacles, to stay on course or to regulate pace when approaching particular objects.

Navigation and wayfinding can be approached in the environmental space. According to Dan Montello's space classification, there are four levels of space with the third being the environmental space. The environmental space represents a very large space, like a city, and can only be fully explored through movement since all objects and space are not directly visible. Also Barbara Tversky systematized the space, but this time taking into consideration the three dimensions that correspond to the axes of the human body and its extensions: above/below, front/back and left/right. Tversky ultimately proposed a fourfold classification of navigable space: space of the body, space around the body, space of navigation and space of graphics.

=== Wayfinding ===
There are two types of wayfinding in navigation: aided and unaided. Aided wayfinding requires a person to use various types of media, such as maps, GPS, directional signage, etc., in their navigation process which generally involves low spatial reasoning and is less cognitively demanding. Unaided wayfinding involves no such devices for the person who is navigating. Unaided wayfinding can be subdivided into a taxonomy of tasks depending on whether it is undirected or directed, which basically makes the distinction of whether there is a precise destination or not: undirected wayfinding means that a person is simply exploring an environment for pleasure without any set destination.

Directed wayfinding can be further subdivided into search vs. target approximation. Search means that a person does not know where the destination is located and must find it either in an unfamiliar environment, which is labeled as an uninformed search, or in a familiar environment, labeled as an informed search. In target approximation, the location of the destination is known to the navigator but a further distinction is made based on whether the navigator knows how to arrive or not to the destination.

Path following means that the environment, the path, and the destination are all known which means that the navigator simply follows the path they already know and arrive at the destination without much thought. For example, when you are in your city and walking on the same path as you normally take from your house to your job or university.

Path finding means that the navigator knows where the destination is, but does not know the route they have to take to arrive at the destination: you know where a specific store is but you do not know how to arrive there or what path to take. If the navigator does not know the environment, it is called path search, which means that only the destination is known while neither the path nor the environment is: you are in a new city and need to arrive at the train station but do not know how to get there.

Path planning, means that the navigator knows both where the destination is and is familiar with the environment so they only need to plan the route or path that they should take to arrive at their target. For example, if you are in your city and need to get to a specific store that you know the destination of but do not know the specific path you need to take to get there.

== See also ==
- Robot navigation
- TVMDC
- Collision avoidance in transportation
- Spatial cognition#Navigation

== Bibliography ==
- Nathaniel Bowditch, The American Practical Navigator, (2002) by the United States government
- Anwar, Nadeem (2015). Navigation Advanced for Mates and Masters (2nd ed.). Edinburgh: Witherby Publishing Group. ISBN 978-1-85609-627-0.
- Cutler, Thomas J. (December 2003). Dutton's Nautical Navigation (15th ed.). Annapolis, MD: Naval Institute Press. ISBN 978-1-55750-248-3.
- Department of the Air Force (March 2001). Air Navigation (PDF). Department of the Air Force. Archived from the original (PDF) on 2007-03-25.
- Great Britain Ministry of Defence (Navy) (1995). Admiralty Manual of Seamanship. The Stationery Office. ISBN 978-0-11-772696-3.
- Gilardoni, Eduardo O.; Presedo, Juan P. (2017). Navigation in Shallow Waters. Livingston, Scotland: Witherbys. ISBN 978-1-85609-667-6.
- Bernhard Hofmann-Wellenhof; K. Legat; M. Wieser (2003). Navigation: principles of positioning and guidance. Springer. ISBN 978-3-211-00828-7.
- Maloney, Elbert S. (December 2003). Chapman Piloting and Seamanship (64th ed.). New York: Hearst Communications Inc. ISBN 978-1-58816-089-8.
- National Imagery and Mapping Agency (2001). Publication 1310: Radar Navigation and Maneuvering Board Manual (7th ed.). Bethesda, MD: U.S. Government Printing Office. Archived from the original (PDF) on 2007-03-07.
- Turpin, Edward A.; McEwen, William A. (1980). Merchant Marine Officers' Handbook (4th ed.). Centreville, MD: Cornell Maritime Press. ISBN 978-0-87033-056-8.
- Martin, William Robert (1911). "Navigation" . In Chisholm, Hugh (ed.). Encyclopædia Britannica. Vol. 19 (11th ed.). Cambridge University Press. pp. 284–298.
- Bunbury, Edward Herbert; Beazley, Charles Raymond (1911). "Pytheas" . In Chisholm, Hugh (ed.). Encyclopædia Britannica. Vol. 22 (11th ed.). Cambridge University Press. pp. 703–704.
- Raol, Jitendra; Gopal, Ajith (2013), Mobile Intelligent Autonomous Systems, Boca Raton, FL: CRC Press Taylor and Francis Group, ISBN 978-1-4398-6300-8
- Williams, J. E. D. (1992). From Sails to Satellites. Oxford: Oxford University Press, USA. ISBN 0-19-856387-6.
