= Lahore family of astrolabists =

Astronomer family from Lahore, Punjab

The Lahore family of astrolabists were seven scientific instrument makers from four generations of the same family. They worked at Lahore in the Mughal Empire (present-day Pakistan) in the period from 1567 to 1692. They made astrolabes, celestial globes, and other astronomical instruments including some for emperors and other noble patrons. The most prolific of the family, Diya al-Din Muhammad, made scientific instruments for two different Mughal emperors. The Lahore family were known for technically precise engraving and for innovative designs. They made each astrolabe individually, never by reusing moulds or any kind of mass-production.

They are not mentioned in any contemporary documents. Everything known about them has been assembled from inscriptions on their surviving instruments, now present in a number of countries. Each maker usually signed their own name and the names of their ancestors, allowing scholars to reconstruct the family tree. More than one hundred scientific instruments in present-day collections have their signatures. Dozens more have been attributed to them because of stylistic similarity. A great majority of the surviving Indian astrolabes from the sixteenth and seventeenth centuries were made by this family; no other maker or family of makers had similar success. The astrolabes they made are called "Indo-Persian" because they have Arabic or Persian inscriptions rather than Indian languages.

== Individuals and their creations ==
Astrolabe by Allah-Dad, History of Science Museum, Oxford, UK

=== Allah-Dad ===
The head of the family was known as Allah-Dad (also written Ilah-Dad) and used the toponym "Lahuri", meaning that he worked in Lahore. He had the titles shaykh (meaning "elder") and ustad (meaning "master craftsman"). According to an inscription by his son Isa, he was scientific instrument maker to the emperor Humayun. At least two of his creations have survived to the present day: an astrolabe in the Salar Jung Museum in India and another, from around 1570, in the History of Science Museum in the UK (inventory number 47376). An unsigned astrolabe in the collection of the National Maritime Museum in the UK (inventory number AST0560), dating from around 1570, has many similarities to the Salar Jung Museum's instrument and is thought to be from the same maker. Allah-Dad engraved astrolabes with gazetteers of named locations including their latitudes and longitudes. This practice was continued by the rest of the family.

=== Isa ===
Allah-Dad's son Isa is known by three surviving astrolabes. One, dated 1010 AH (1600 CE), is in the Museum of Islamic Art, Doha. The Adler Planetarium has two more, from 1601 (inventory number N-69) and 1604/5 (inventory A-79). Isa introduced the practice of engraving astrolabes with graphs showing the annual variation of solar meridian altitude.

Isa had two sons who also made scientific instruments: Qaim Muhammad and Muhammad Muqim.

=== Qaim Muhammad ===
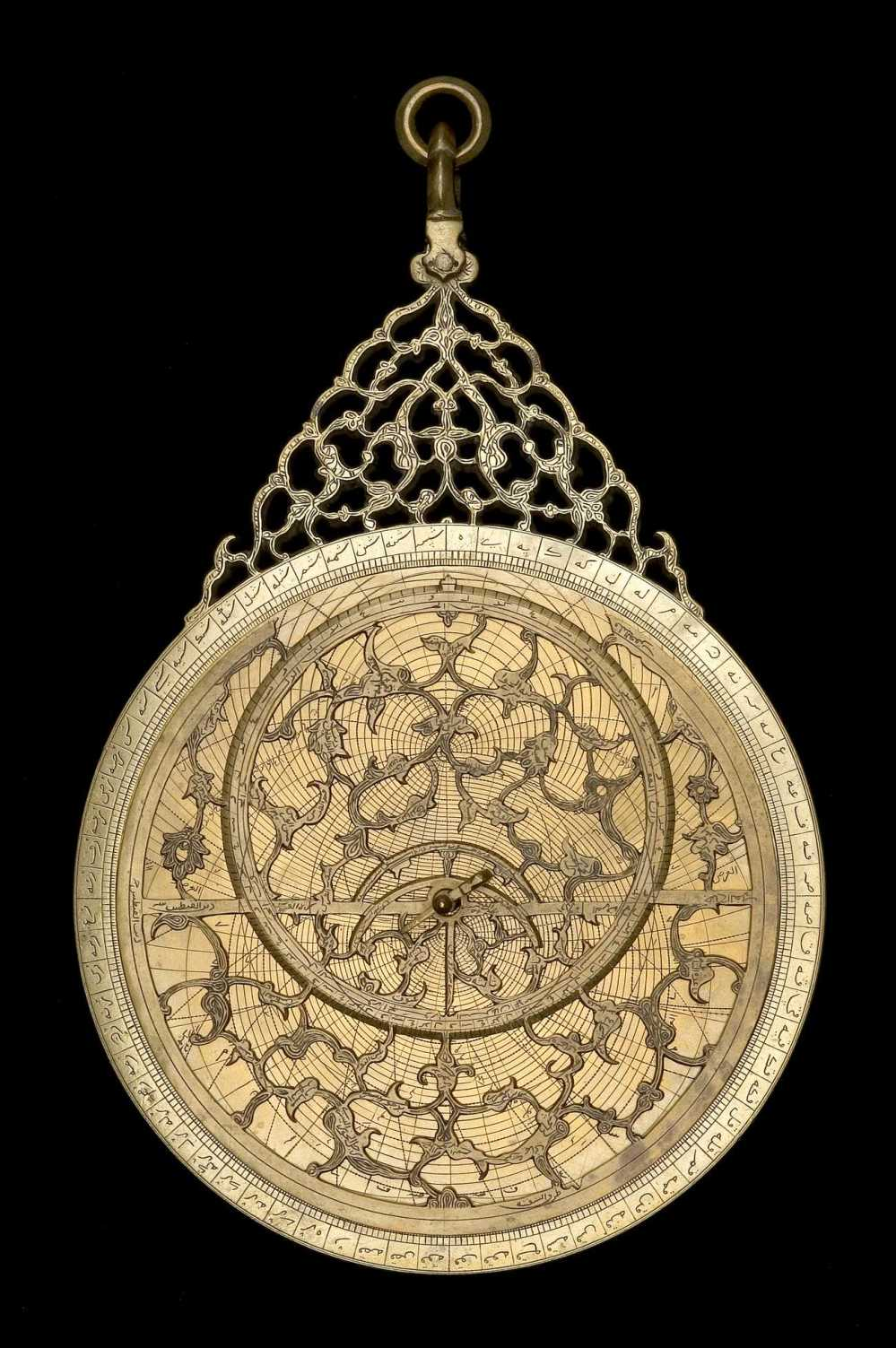
Astrolabe by Qaim Muhammad, History of Science Museum

Six astrolabes and five celestial globes made by Qaim Muhammad have survived to the present day. Celestial globes had previously been made by creating two hemispheres separately and joining them together, leaving a seam. Qaim Muhammad worked out how to make the whole instrument at once using lost-wax casting. One of these celestial globes was made for Nawāb Iʿtiqād Khān, brother of the emperor Jahangir's consort Nur Jahan.

One celestial globe, dated the 18th year of emperor Jahangir's reign (1622–1623 CE) is at Stonyhurst College in the UK. Another, dated to the 22nd year of the same reign (1626/7 CE) is in the collection of the V&A Museum in London, UK. The History of Science Museum has an astrolabe dated 1044 AH (1634/5 CE) (inventory number 42730).

An unsigned and undated celestial globe in the National Museum of American History (inventory number 330,781) has been attributed to Qaim Muhammad because of similarities in construction and in the representation of constellations.

There are two astrolabes known to be made jointly by Qaim Muhammad and his brother, Muhammad Muqim. One is in a museum in Iraq. The other was made for Aqa Afzal, a nobleman who held senior posts in the courts of Jahangir and Shah Jahan. The latter astrolabe was sold at auction in London in April 2006 for more than £2 million, setting a record price for a scientific instrument from the Islamic world.

Qaim Muhammad's son, Diya al-Din Muhammad, was another scientific instrument maker.

=== Muhammad Muqim ===
In the period 1609 to 1659, Muhammad Muqim constructed 45 astrolabes (eight of which are attributed to him because of similarity to the signed examples) and one celestial globe. His astrolabes were in a wide variety of sizes, never repeating designs. They range from a miniature version only 43 millimetres (1.7 in) across to some unusually large astrolabes made for presentation rather than practical use.

The Islamabad Museum has one astrolabe by Muhammad Muqim made in 1637 (inventory number N.M.1959–407). The Lahore Museum has an undated astrolabe, inventory number M-44-1. The Tomb of Humayun museum in Delhi has two astrolabes signed by Muhammad Muqim, dated 1034 AH (1625 CE) and 1047 AH (1637/8 CE). The National Maritime Museum in London has a signed and dated astrolabe from 1051 AH (1641/2 CE), inventory number AST0579. The History of Science Museum, Oxford has an astrolabe from around 1650 (inventory number 37530).

Muhammad Muqim had two sons, Hamid and Jamal al-Din.

=== Diya al-Din Muhammad ===
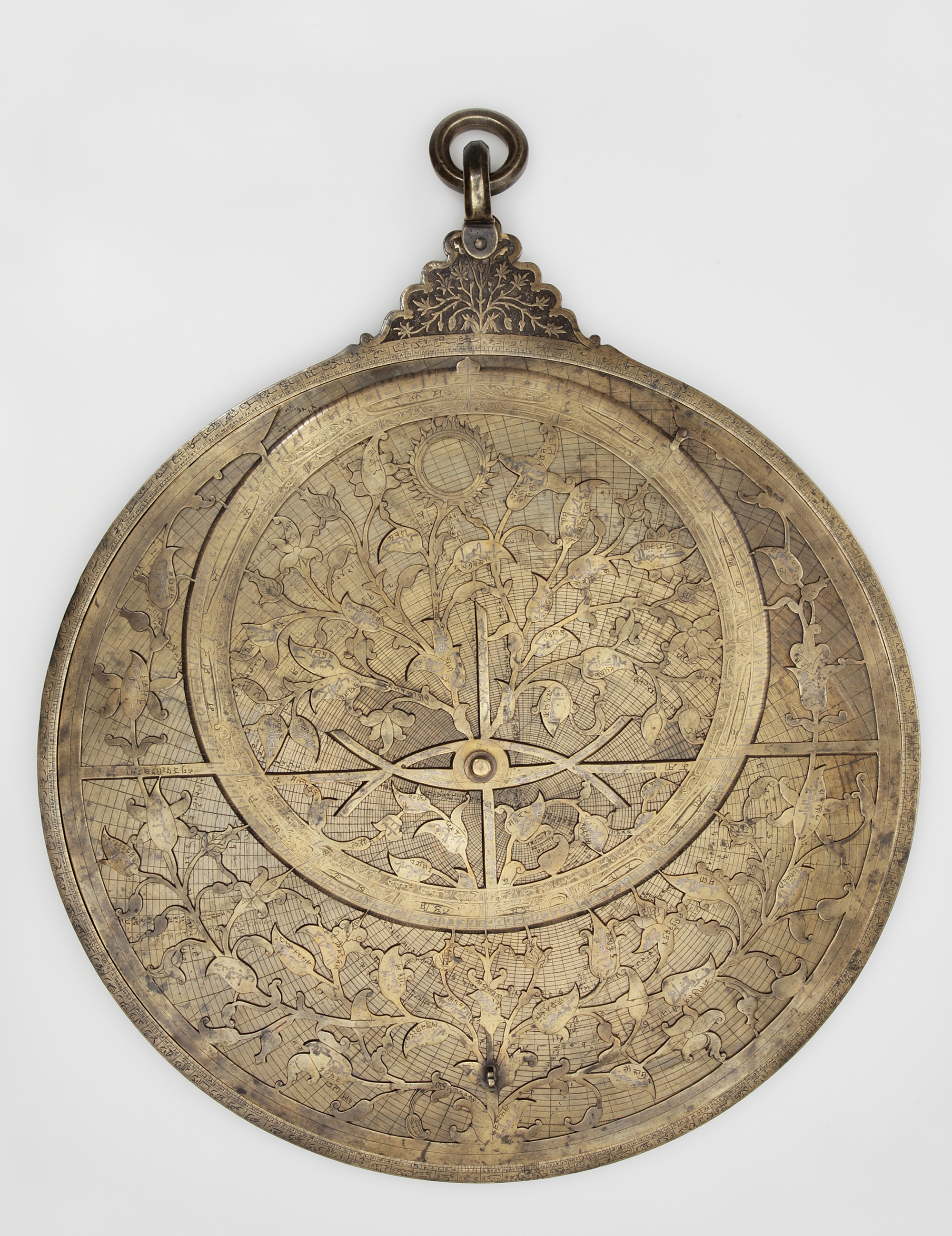
The Khalili astrolabe

Diya al-Din Muhammad (also written Ziauddin Muhammad) was the most prolific of the family in terms of the number of instruments created, and also the most versatile, producing unusual designs. He made many celestial globes, continuing the seamless technique invented by his father.

For the Mughal emperor Aurangzeb, Diya al-Din made a celestial globe that, when lit from within, projected the shapes of constellations as shadows. That globe is now in the collection of the Adler Planetarium in Chicago, US. For the emperor Shah Jahan, he created an unusually large astrolabe which is now in the Khalili Collection of Islamic Art and known as the Khalili astrolabe. Although the date has been erased, it must have been made between 1648 and 1658. Commenting on the Khalili Collection's scientific instruments, scholar David A. King described it as "the pride of the collection".

Some current collections with his instruments are shown in the table below.

Date	Type	Collection	Inventory no.	Reference
1637–8	astrolabe	Adler Planetarium, US	A-86	
1647–8	astrolabe	Adler Planetarium, US	A-70	
1648–58	astrolabe (Khalili astrolabe)	Khalili Collection of Islamic Art, UK	SCI 53	
1649	astrolabe	Darul Uloom Nadwatul Ulama, India		
1651–2	astrolabe	National Museum Cardiff, UK	39.573/2	
1656	astrolabe	Jaipur Observatory, India		
1656–7	celestial sphere	V&A museum, UK	IS.2324-1883	
1657–8	celestial globe	National Museum Cardiff, UK	39.573/1	
1658–9	astrolabe	History of Science Museum, Oxford, UK	53637	
1659–60	celestial globe	Museum of Islamic Art, Cairo	3800	
1660–1	astrolabe	Adler Planetarium, US	A-81	
1660–1	celestial globe	Staatliche Museen zu Berlin		
1662–3	astrolabe	Adler Planetarium, US	A-78	
1663	astrolabe	Khuda Bakhsh Oriental Public Library, India		
1669–70	mater of an astrolabe	Khalili Collection of Islamic Art, UK	SCI 283	
1679–80	celestial sphere	Adler Planetarium, US	A-398	

Adler Planetarium, A-86

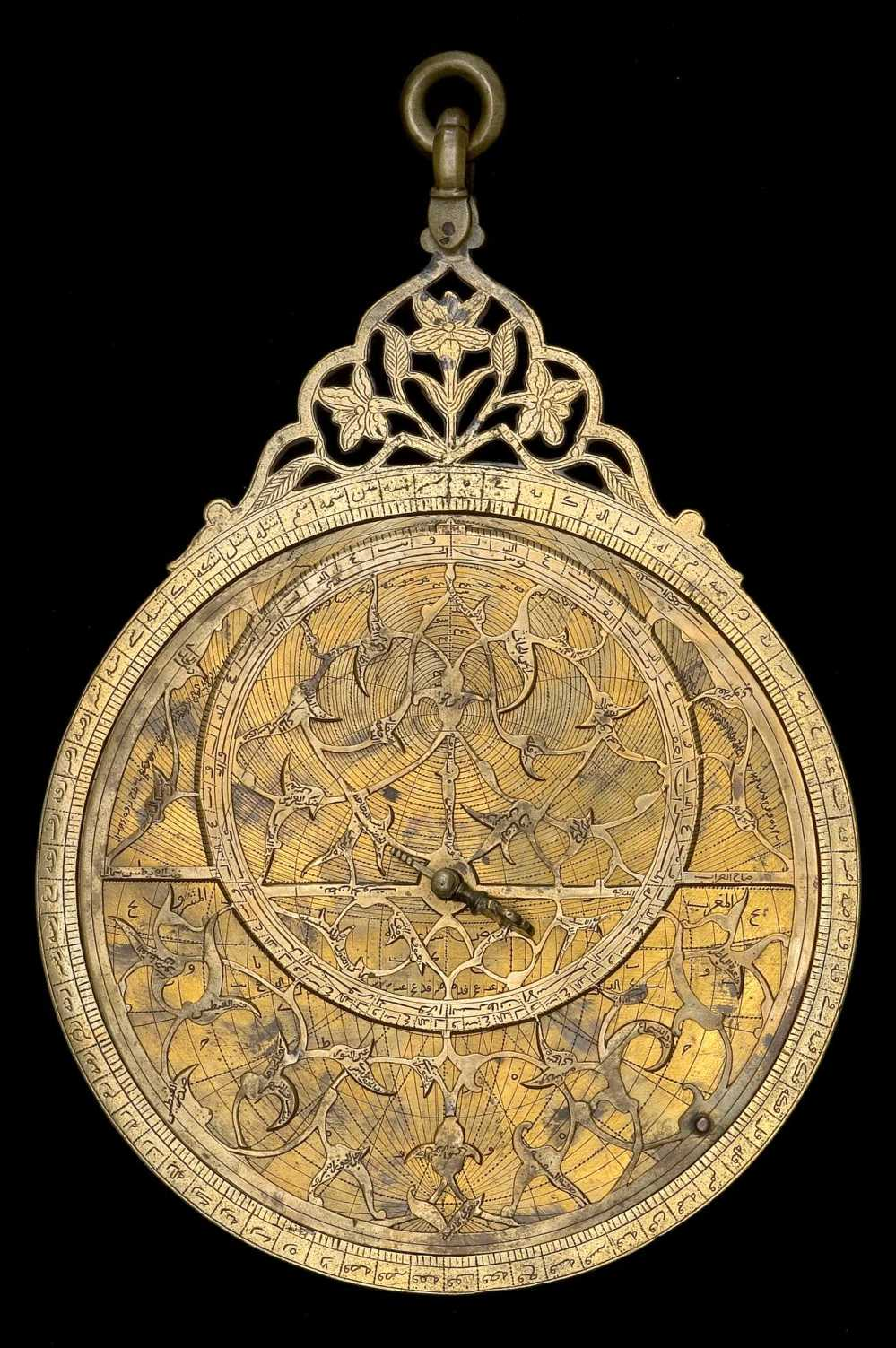
History of Science Museum, 53637

Khalili Collection of Islamic Art, SCI 283

=== Hamid ===
Combined planispheric astrolabe and qiblah indicator, signed by Hamid, Khalili Collection of Islamic art

Diya al-Din Muhammad's cousins, Hamid and Jamal al-Din, produced works of noticeably lower quality than the rest of the family, and quality declined towards the end of their careers.

Hamid produced eleven astrolabes and four celestial globes, dated from 1655 to 1691. One astrolabe, dated 1686, includes a world map allowing the user to find the direction of Mecca for prayer. This is in the Khalili Collection of Islamic Art (inventory number SCI 5). The same collection also has an astrolabe dated 1657 (inventory number SCI 13). A celestial globe dating from 1655 is now in the Whipple Museum of the History of Science in the UK (inventory number 1255).

=== Jamal al-Din ===
Jamal al-Din produced four astrolabes from 1666 to 1692. One of them is dated 1077 AH (1666/7 CE); like his brother's astrolabe, it bears a large map for finding the direction of Mecca. It has four solar meridian altitude curves corresponding to different latitudes, but no curve corresponding to Lahore, which suggests that the maker was no longer working there. It is now in the collection of the Science Museum, London (inventory number 1985-2077).

== Metallurgy ==
The brass used for Lahore astrolabes was of a different quality from that used anywhere else in the world. A 2006 metallurgical study of eight astrolabes, including two by Isa and four by Diya al-Din Muhammad, found that they used high-zinc brass. This required a more advanced manufacturing process than normal brass, but was easier to work into a thin sheet. The high-zinc process was not used at industrial scale in Europe until the nineteenth century. The study of the Lahore astrolabes suggests that it was in use in the Mughal Empire at the start of the seventeenth century.

== See also ==
- Lala Bulhomal Lahori
- Muhammad Saleh Thattvi
