= Khalili Collections =

8 art collections of Nasser D. Khalili

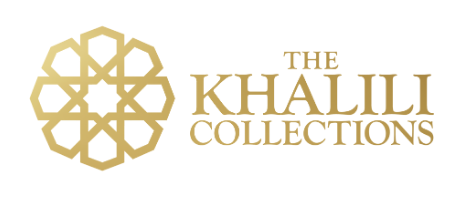
- Logo of the Khalili Collections
- Established: 1970; 56 years ago
- Collection size: 35,000
- Founder: Nasser D. Khalili
- Website: www.khalilicollections.org

The Khalili Collections are eight distinct art collections assembled by Nasser D. Khalili over five decades. Together, the collections include some 35,000 works of art, and each is considered among the most important in its field.

Among these are the largest private collection of Islamic art, with 26,000 objects. A separate collection includes around 5,000 objects relating to the Hajj, spanning from the 7th century AD to the present day. From Japan, there are 2,200 pieces of Meiji era decorative art and another collection of more than 450 kimono, covering a 300-year period. The most comprehensive private collection of enamels, with over 1,500 pieces, includes examples from China, Japan, Europe, and Islamic lands. The eight collections also include 100 flatweave textiles from southern Sweden, 150 examples of Spanish damascened metalwork (i.e. with metal inlaid into other metal), and 48 Aramaic documents from 4th century-BC Bactria. These various collections show two themes that commonly motivate private collections: collecting examples of the highest artistic merit and forming complete series.

One hundred catalogues and monographs describing the collections are being published. There have been numerous public exhibitions drawn exclusively from the collections, as well as loans of objects to heritage institutions.

== Collections ==
=== Islamic art (700–2000) ===
The Khalili Collections include one of the world's most comprehensive collections of Islamic art and the largest in private hands. The Nasser D. Khalili Collection of Islamic Art includes 26,000 objects documenting arts from Islamic lands over a period of almost 1400 years. It was described in 1998 as "one of the largest and most representative collections of Quranic manuscripts in the world" and is the largest private collection. Khalili is motivated by a belief that Islamic art is the most beautiful, yet has been underappreciated by the wider world. The collection has been described as presenting art works of interest to Westerners without abstracting them away from the aesthetic standards of Islamic culture. Khalili defines Islamic art as "art produced by Muslim artists for Muslim patrons"; only a minority of the objects have an explicitly religious purpose.

In addition to rare and illustrated manuscripts, the collection includes album and miniature paintings, lacquer, ceramics, glass and rock crystal, metalwork, arms and armour, jewellery, carpets and textiles, over 15,000 coins and architectural elements. The ceramic collection, numbering around 2,000, has been described as particularly strong in pottery of the Timurid era and also pottery of pre-Mongol Bamiyan. The jewellery collection includes more than 600 rings, many purely decorative but some with religious inscriptions or having a secular function, such as signet rings. Around two hundred objects relate to medieval Islamic science and medicine, including astronomical instruments for orienting towards Mecca, scales and weights, and supposedly magical objects intended for medical use.

This collection was the basis in 2008 for the first comprehensive exhibition of Islamic art to be staged in the Middle East, at the Emirates Palace in Abu Dhabi. This was also the largest exhibition of Islamic art held anywhere up to that date. Exhibitions drawing exclusively from the collection have been held at Art Gallery of New South Wales in Sydney, the Institut du Monde Arabe in Paris and the Nieuwe Kerk in Amsterdam as well as at many other museums and institutions worldwide.

The collection includes folios from manuscripts with Persian miniatures, including the Great Mongol Shahnameh (c. 1330s), ten folios from the Shahnameh of Shah Tahmasp (c. 1520), and 59 folios from the oldest manuscript of the Jami al-tawarikh (1314), Rashid-al-Din’s world history. There is also a 13th-century saddle from the era of Genghis Khan, and the Khalili astrolabe made for the Mughal emperor Shah Jahan.

The Wall Street Journal has called it the greatest collection of Islamic Art in existence. According to Edward Gibbs, Chairman of Middle East and India at Sotheby's, it is the best such collection in private hands.

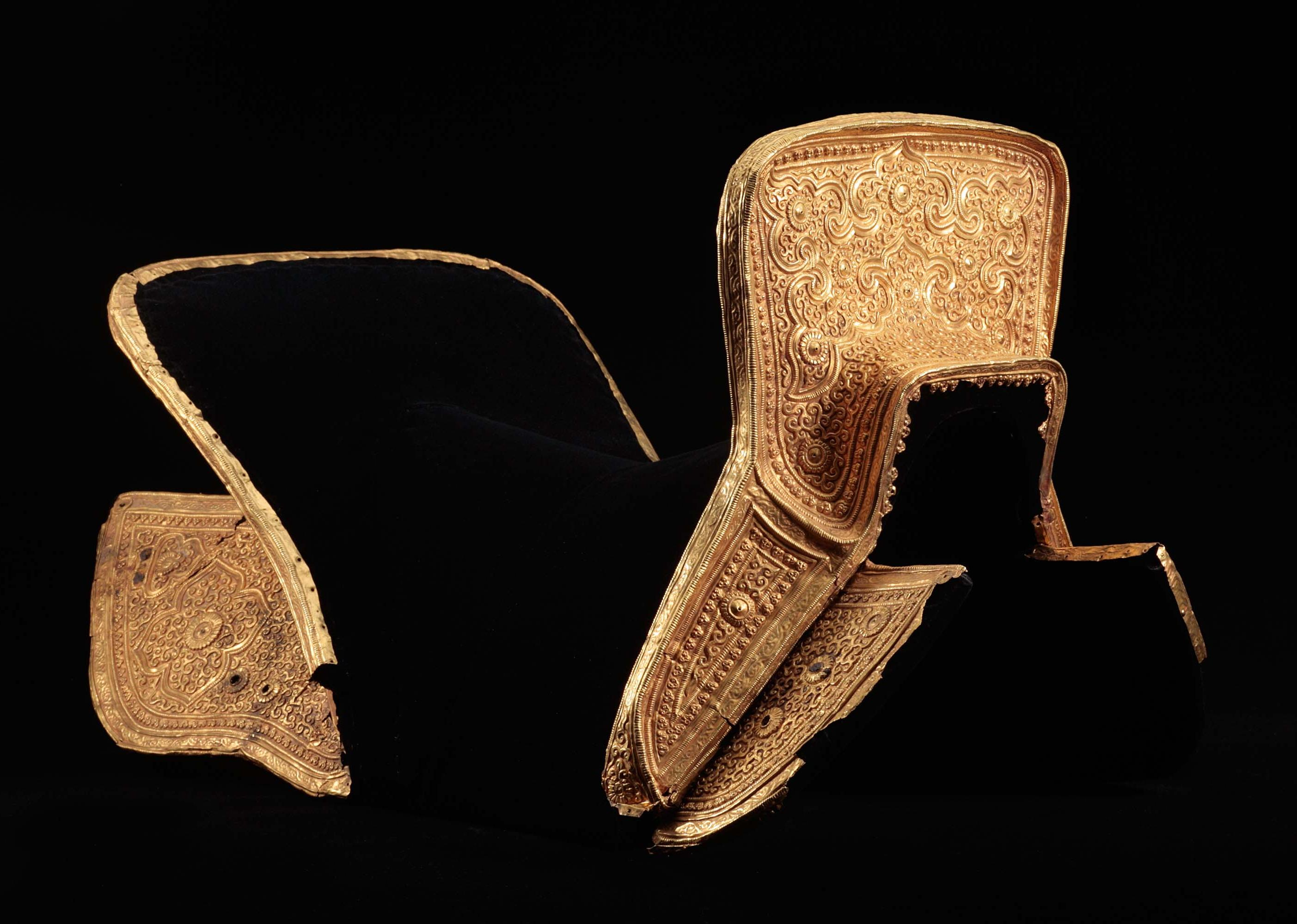
Saddle fittings and horse trappings, Central Asia or Western frontiers of China, circa 1200

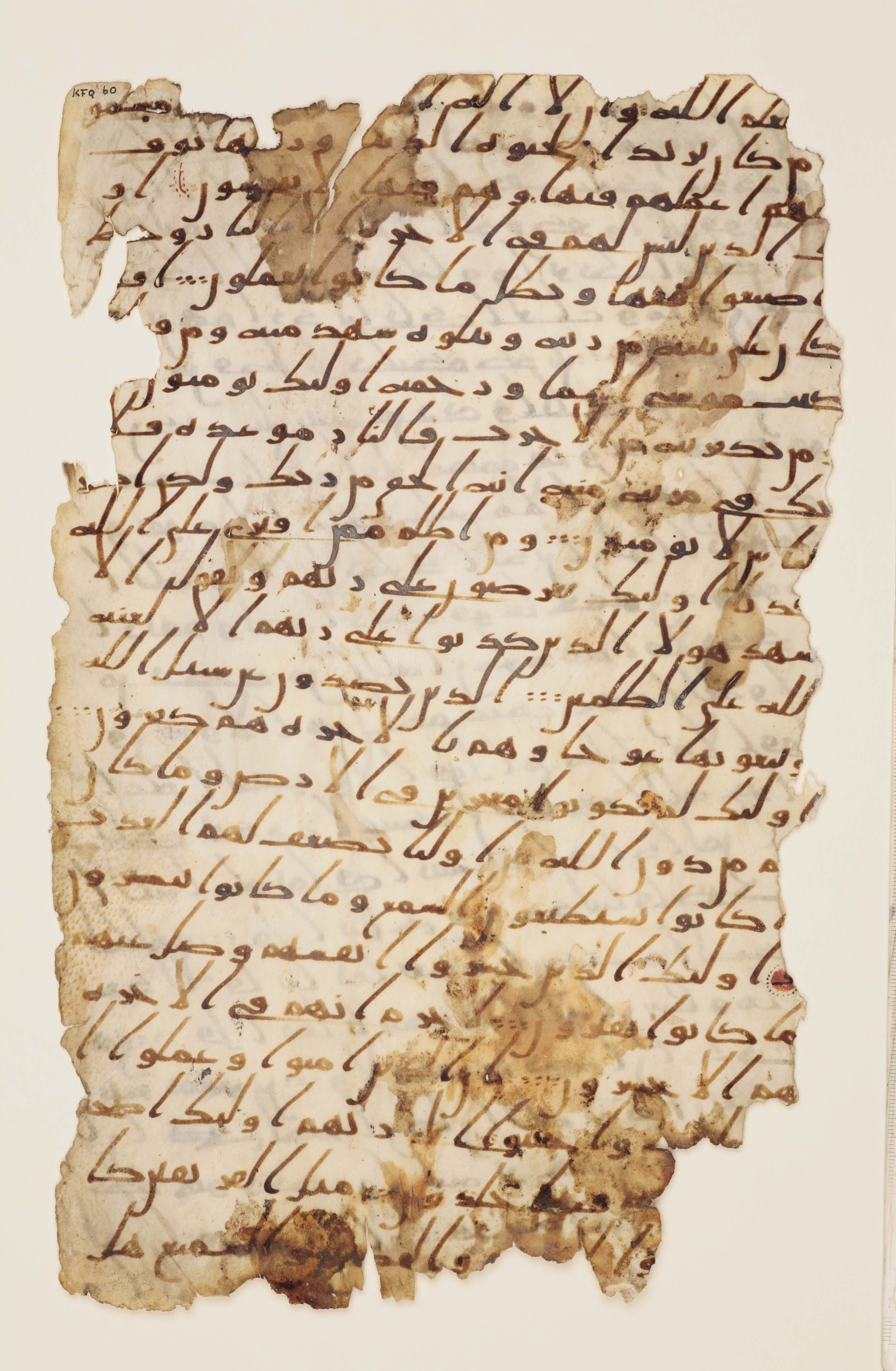
Single folio from the Codex Parisino-petropolitanus, one of the oldest manuscripts of the Quran

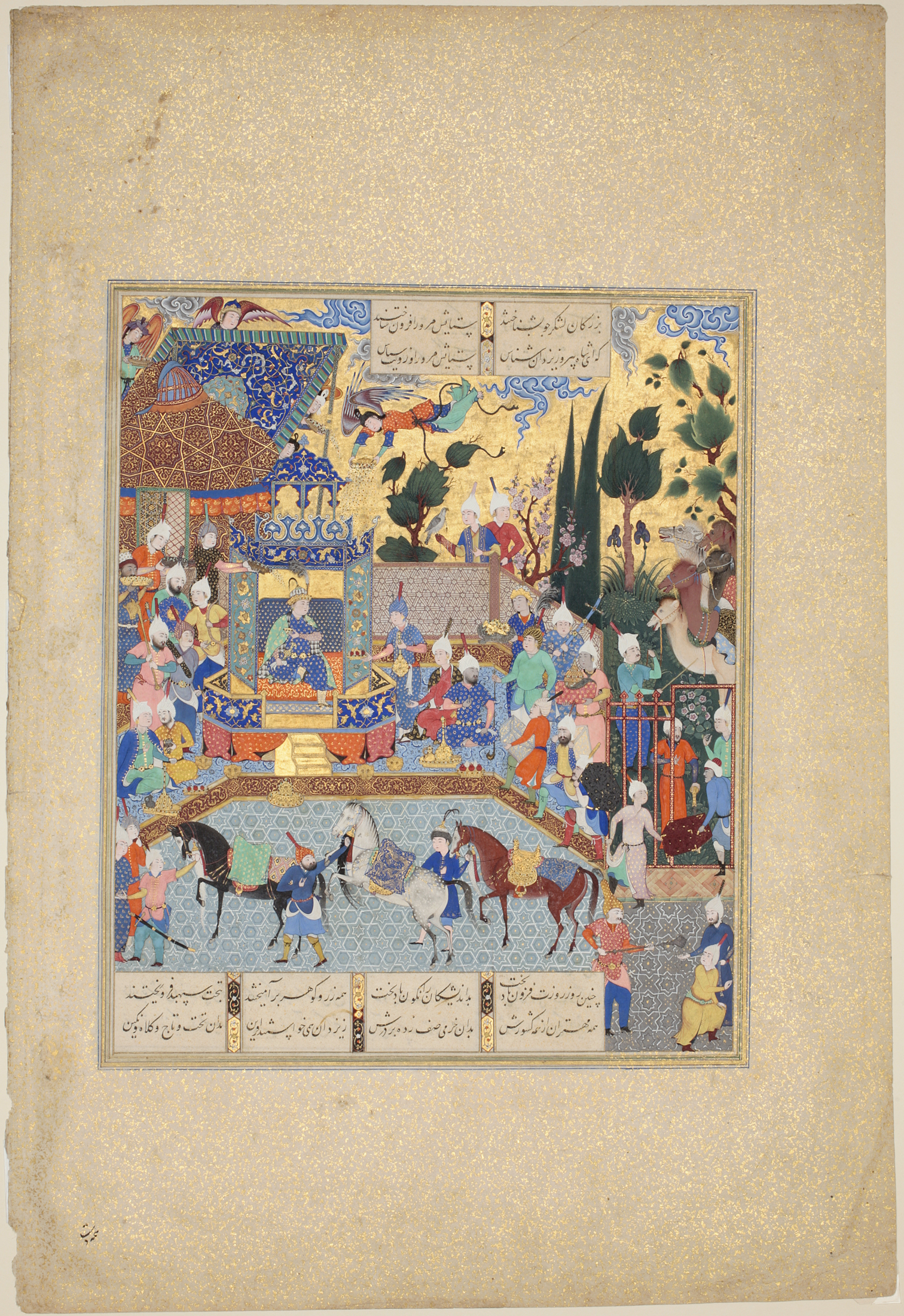
Folio from the Shahnameh of Shah Tahmasp, Tabriz, 1520s–1540s

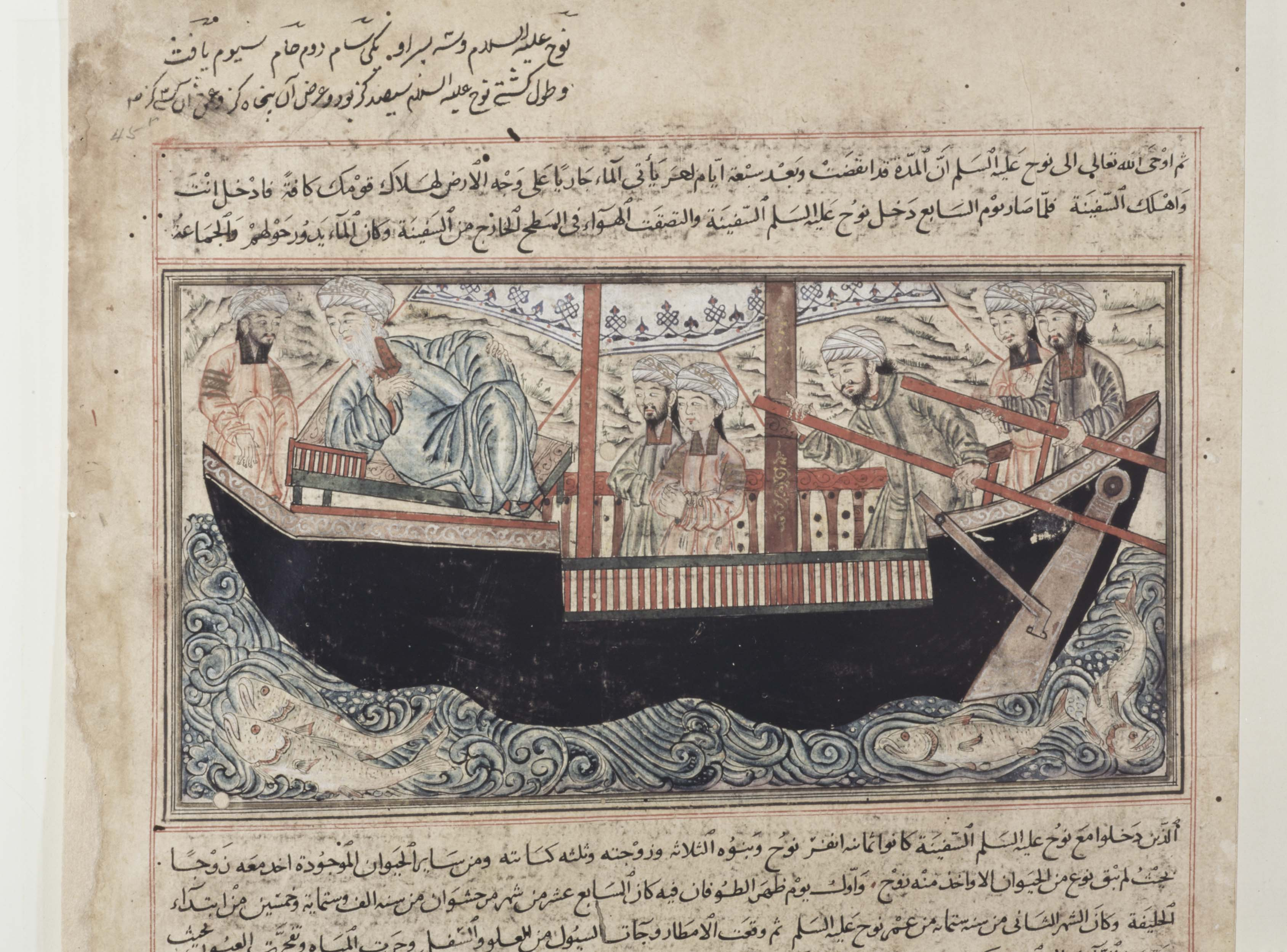
Noah's Ark, from The Jami‘ al-Tawarikh of Rashid al-Din, Tabriz, 1314–15

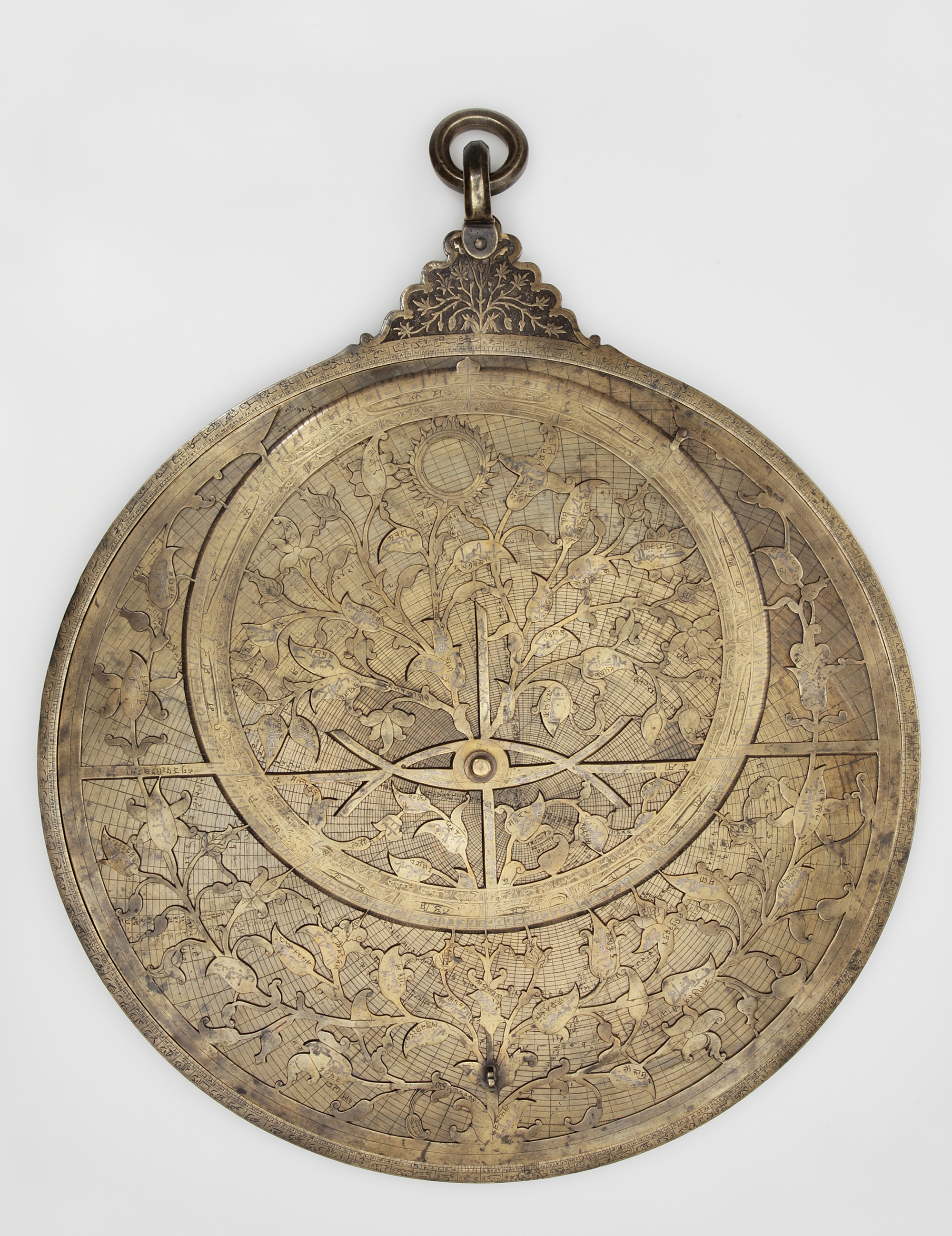
The Khalili astrolabe, a monumental planispheric astrolabe made for Shah Jahan, Punjab, 1648–58

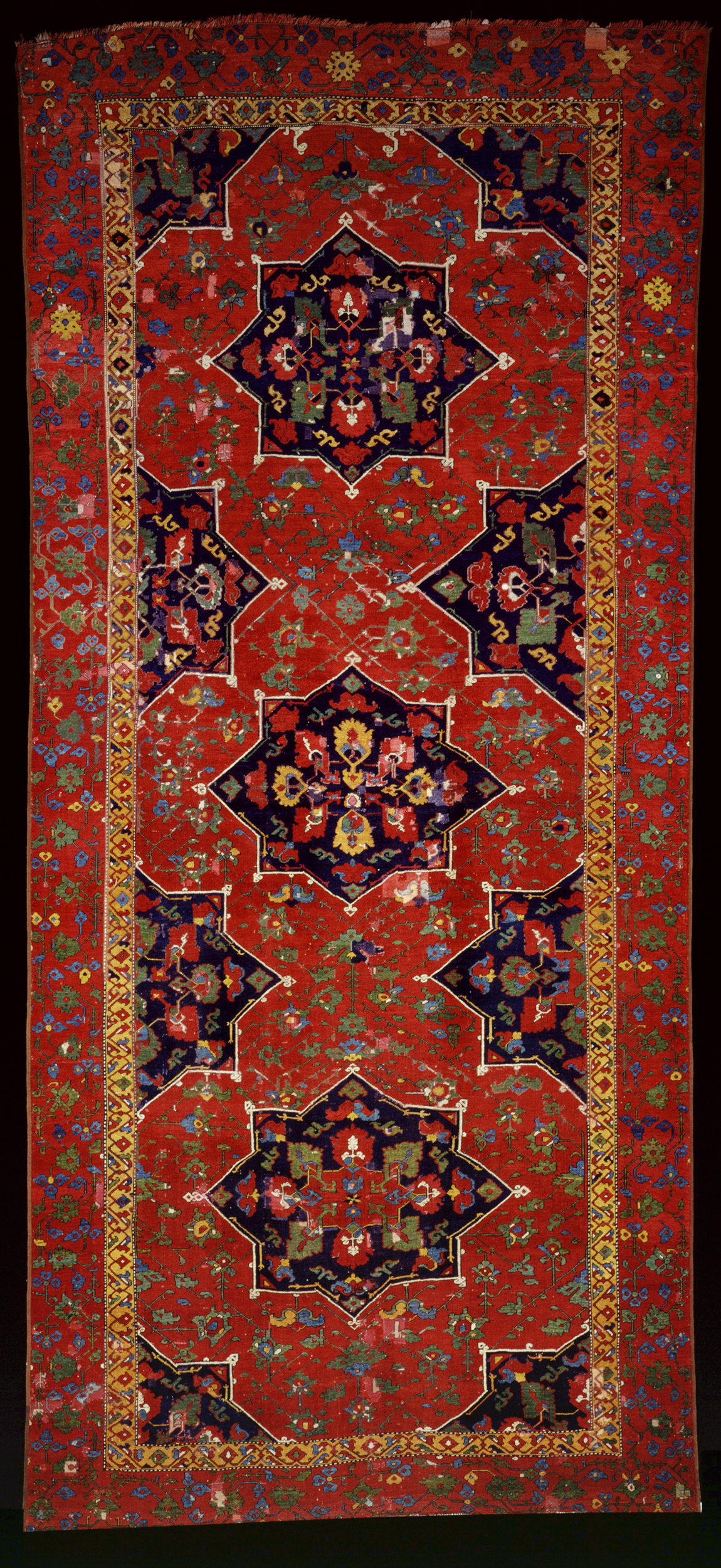
Carpet with star medallions, Uşak, Turkey, late 15th or early 16th century

=== Hajj and the Arts of Pilgrimage (700–2000) ===
Alongside the Topkapı Palace museum, the collection is considered the largest and most significant group of objects relating to the cultural history of the Hajj. It holds objects and archival documents from all over the Islamic world, from the Umayyad period to the 21st century. It includes over 300 textiles and many other objects such as coins, medals, miniatures, manuscripts and photographs relating to Mecca and Medina. In total, the collection contains approximately 5,000 objects. Among them are a mahmal (AH 1067 (AD 1656–7)) commissioned by the Ottoman Sultan Mehmet IV, sitaras (textile coverings) for the door of the Kaaba, for the mosque of the Prophet in Medina, and for the Station of Abraham, the earliest known accurate eyewitness account of Mecca and some of the earliest photographs taken of Mecca and the Hajj, by Mohammed Sadiq Bey.

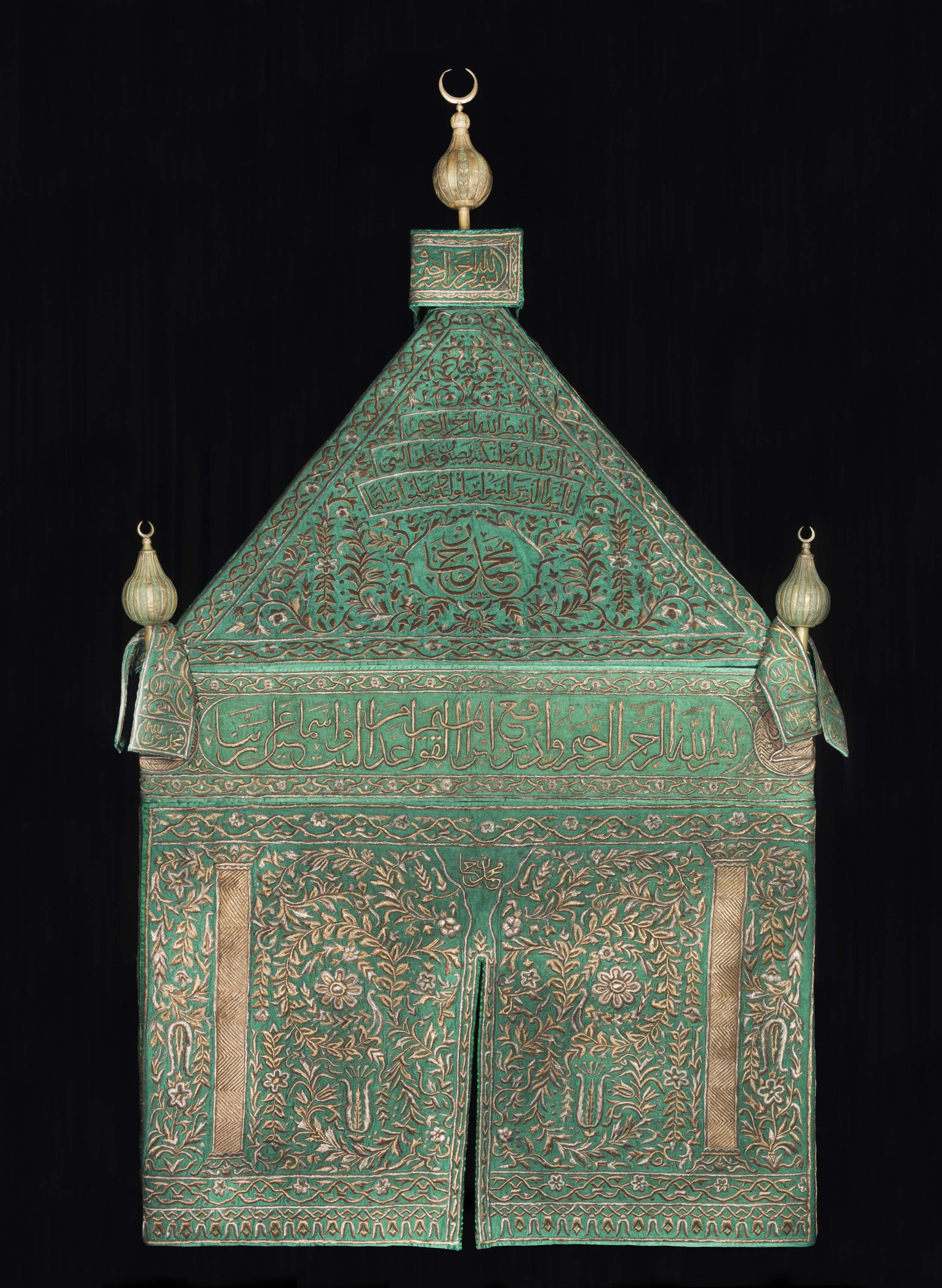
A complete cover for a Damascus mahmal, Istanbul, 16th century

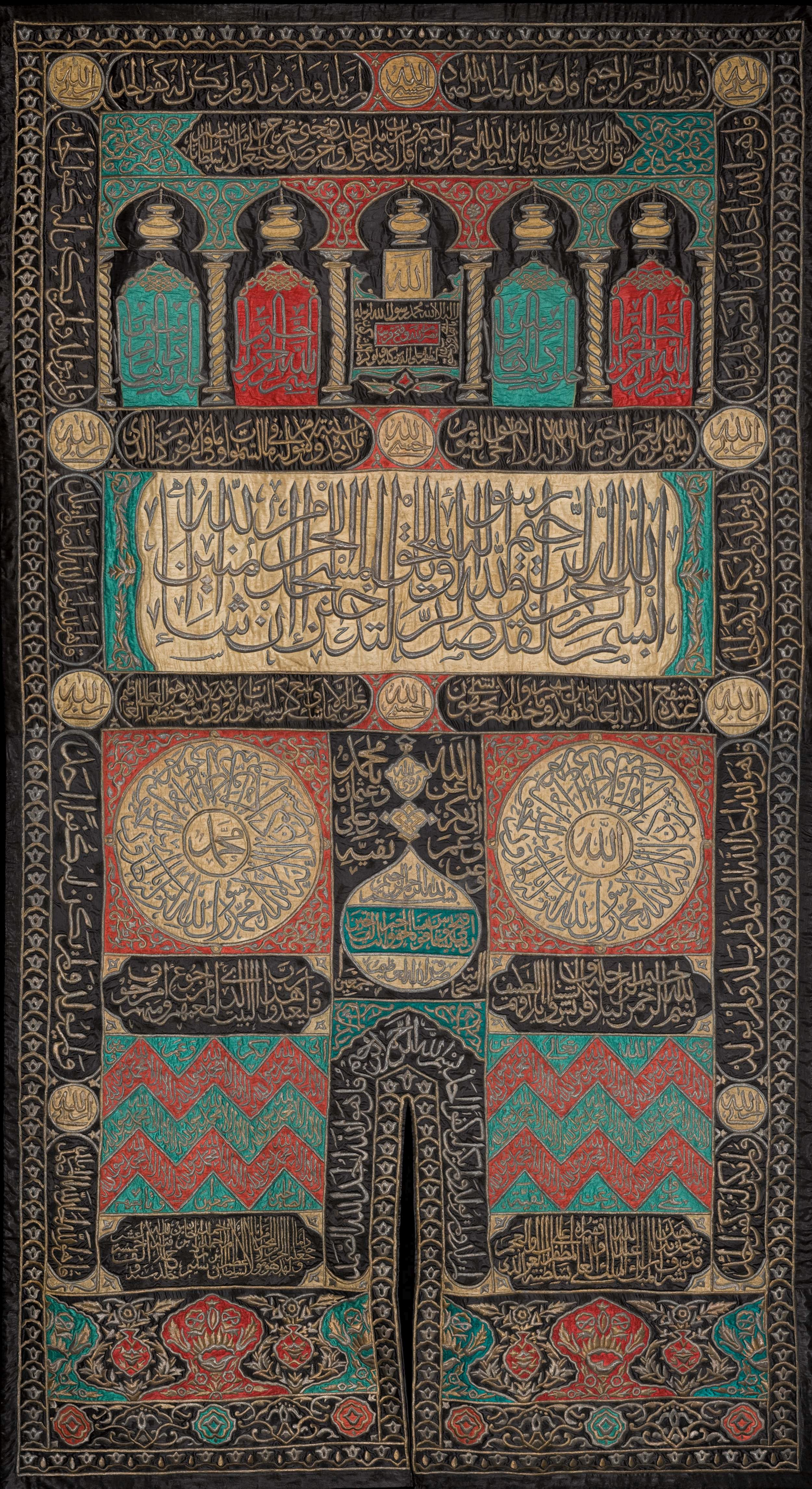
Curtain for door of the Kaaba, Cairo, 1015 AH (1606 AD)

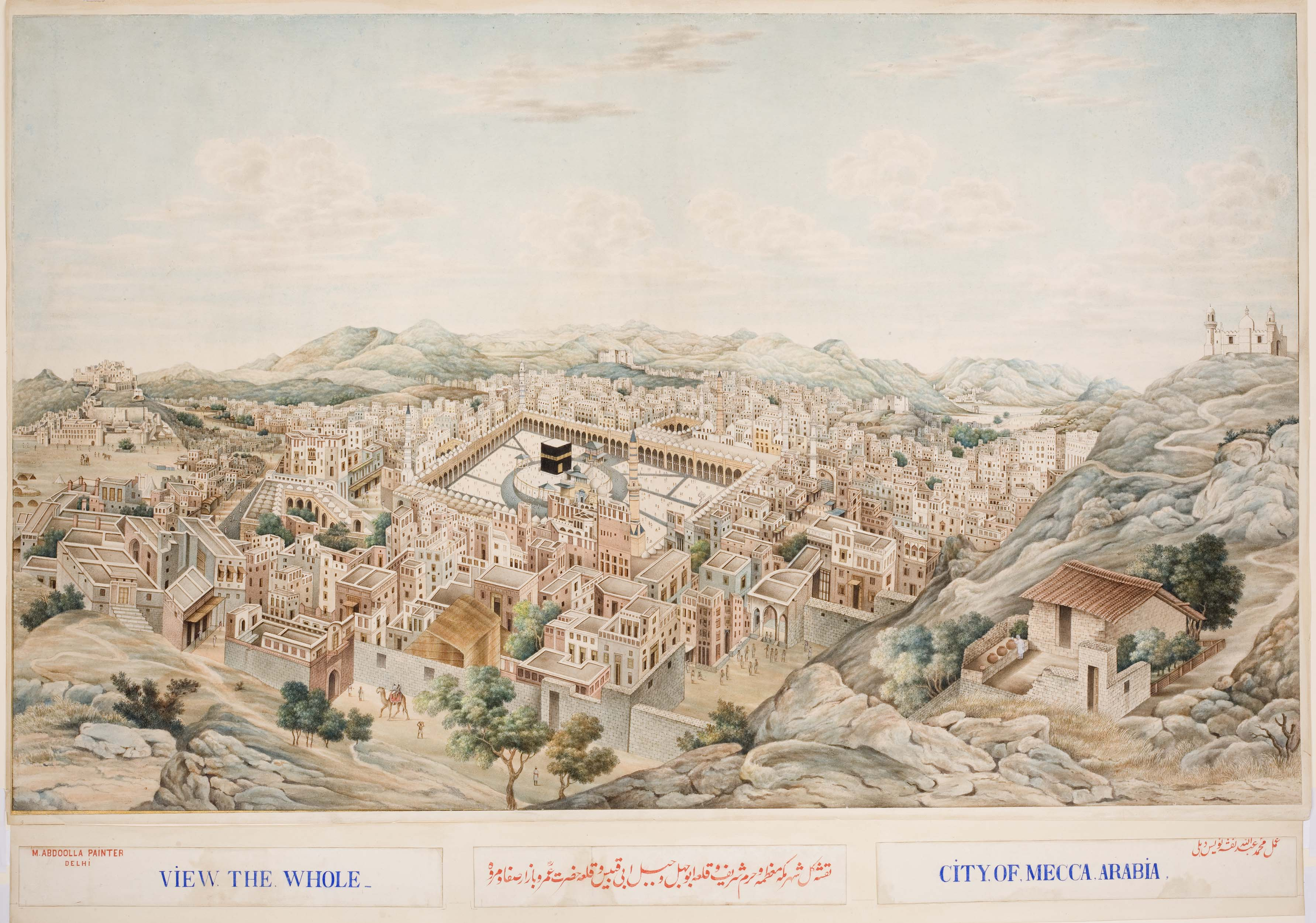
Panoramic view of Mecca, 1845

=== Aramaic Documents (353BC–324BC) ===
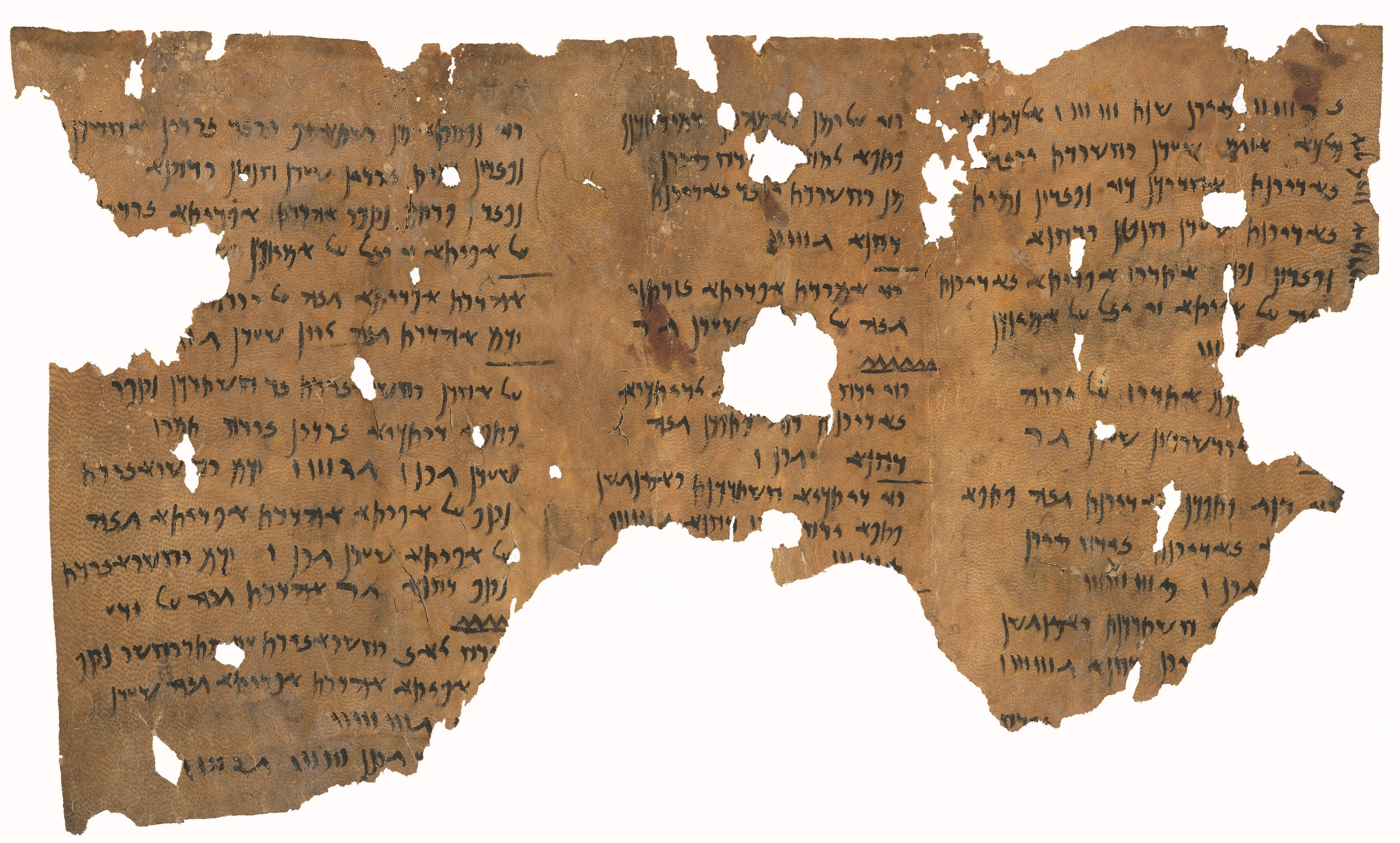
A Long List of Supplies Disbursed, Bactria, starts on 15 Sivan, year 7 of Alexander, corresponding to 8 June 324BC

The collection comprises 48 historically significant Aramaic documents from Ancient Bactria, consisting of mainly letters and accounts related to the court of the satrap of Bactria. Together these letters and accounts make up the oldest known correspondence of the administration of Bactria and Sogdiana. The documents, written in Official Aramaic, were likely to originate from the historical city of Balkh and all are dated within a period of less than 30 years, between 353 BC to 324 BC. The newest of the documents was written during Alexander the Great’s early reign in the region, using the name ‘Alexandros’ (‘Iksndrs’) by which he later became known.

=== Japanese Art of the Meiji Period (1868–1912) ===
The collection of Meiji decorative arts is only comparable in terms of quality to the collection of the Japanese Imperial family. It comprises over 2,200 pieces, including metalwork, enamels, lacquer, textiles and ceramics. The Meiji period saw a cultural revolution in Japan where traditional tastes were met with international ones. Since the beginning of Emperor Meiji’s reign in Japan, European and international collectors have sought pieces of Japanese art from this era. Many works in the collections were produced by Imperial Court artists and were exhibited at the Great Exhibitions of the late 19th century. These imperial court artists include Shibata Zeshin, Namikawa Yasuyuki, Makuzu Kozan, Yabu Meizan, Kano Natsuo, Suzuki Chokichi, and Shirayama Shosai.

Exhibitions drawing exclusively from the collection have been held at the British Museum, Israel Museum, Van Gogh Museum, Portland Museum, Moscow Kremlin Museums, and at many other museums and institutions worldwide.

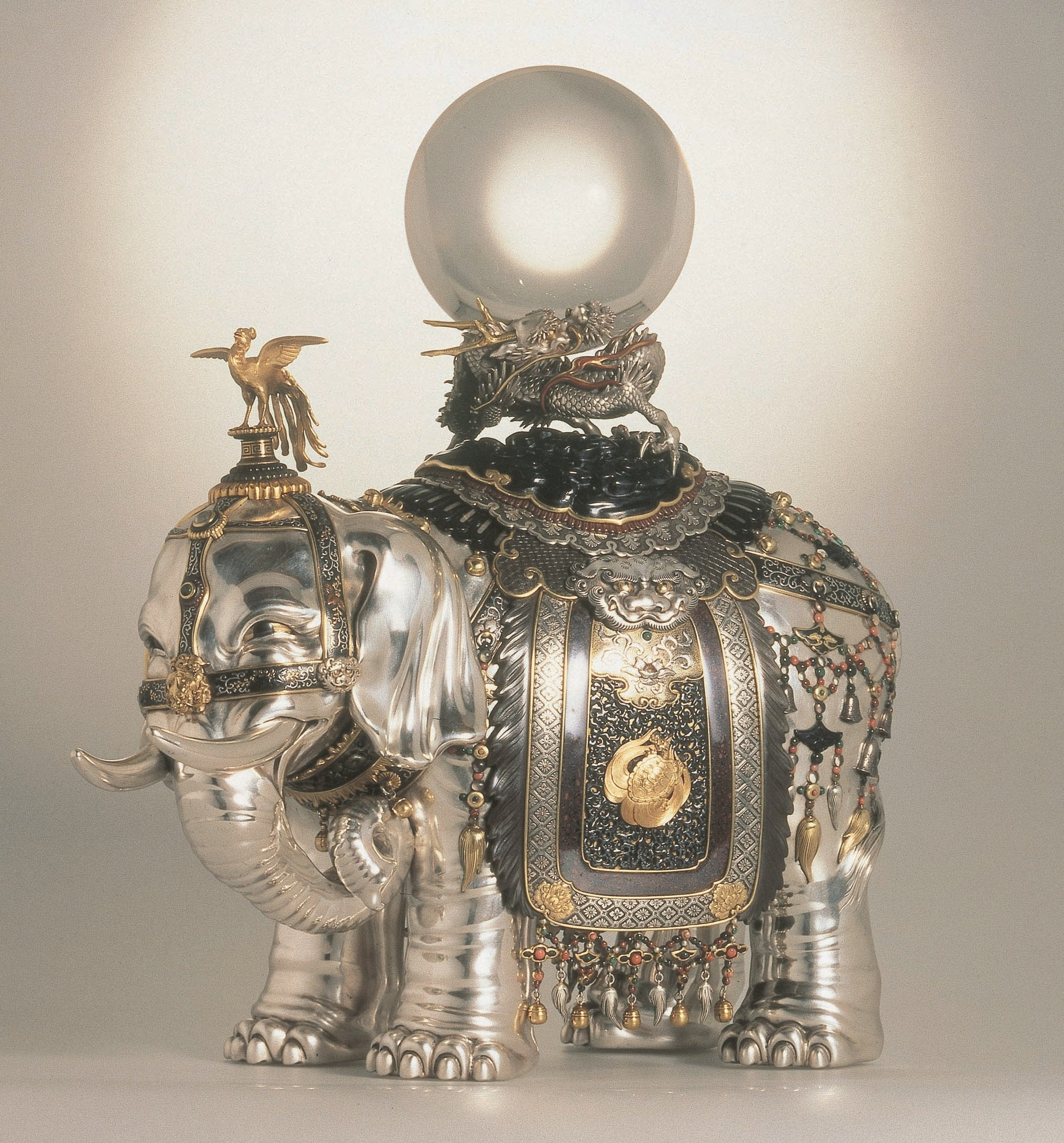
Incense burner (Koro), Japan, 1890

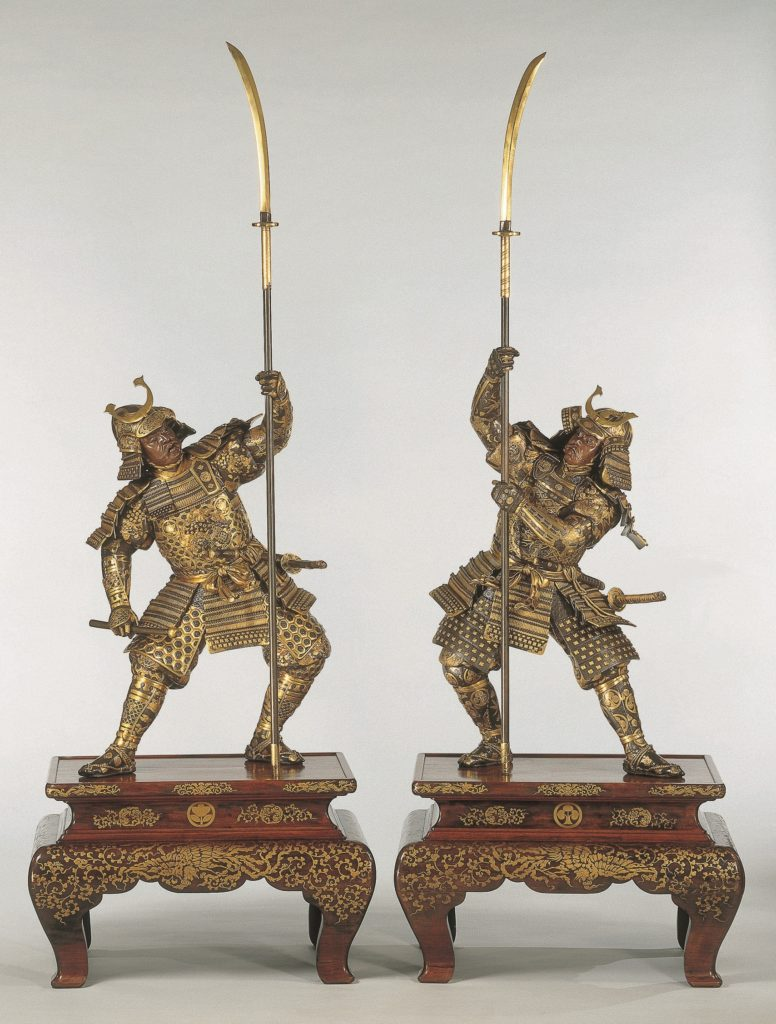
Pair of samurai figures, Japan, 1890

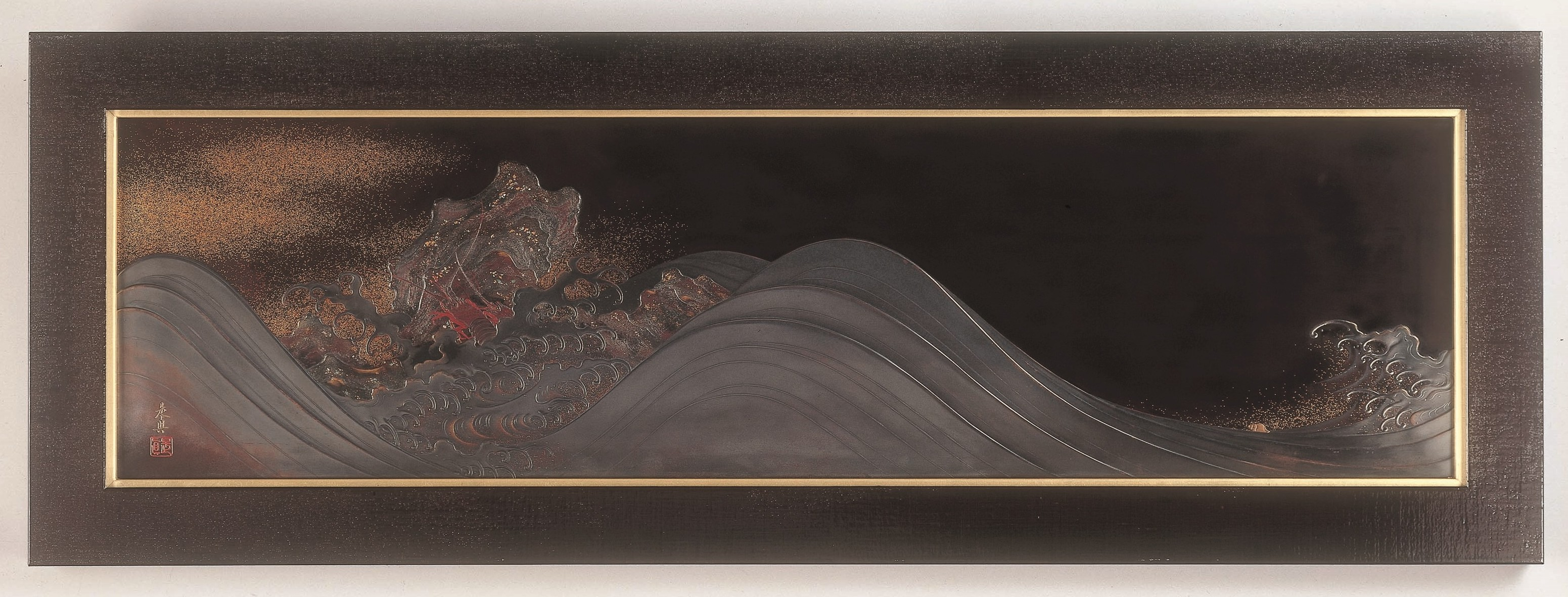
"Waves" panel by Shibata Zeshin, 1888-1890

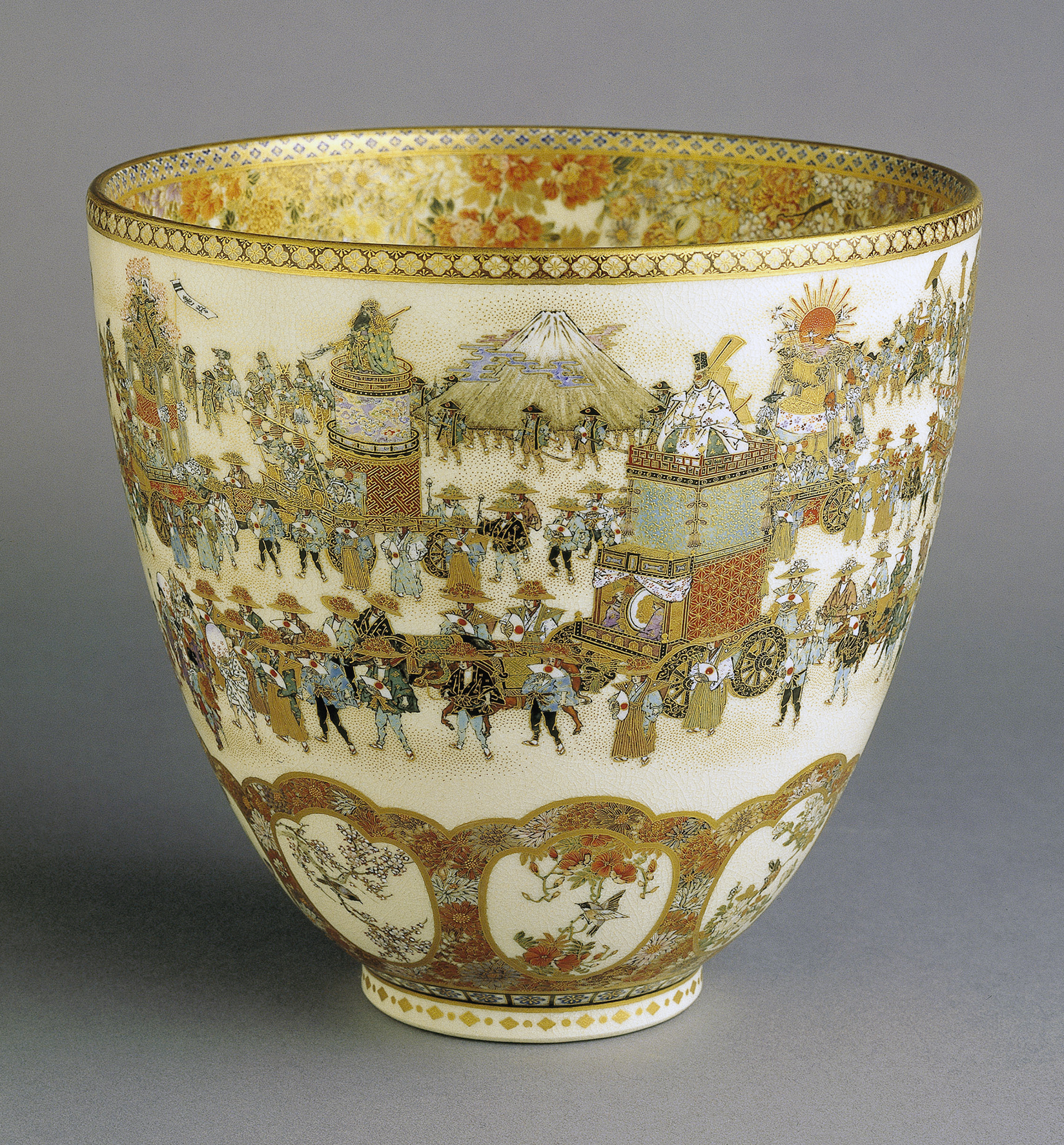
Earthenware bowl by Yabu Meizan, circa 1910

=== Japanese Kimono (1700–2000) ===
The collection represents three hundred years of the Japanese textile industry and contains over 450 garments. The garments have been worn to demonstrate gender, age, status and wealth throughout Japan's history. The core of the collection is made up of kimono from the Edo (1603–1868), Meiji (1868–1912), Taisho (1912–1926) and early Showa (1926–1989) eras.

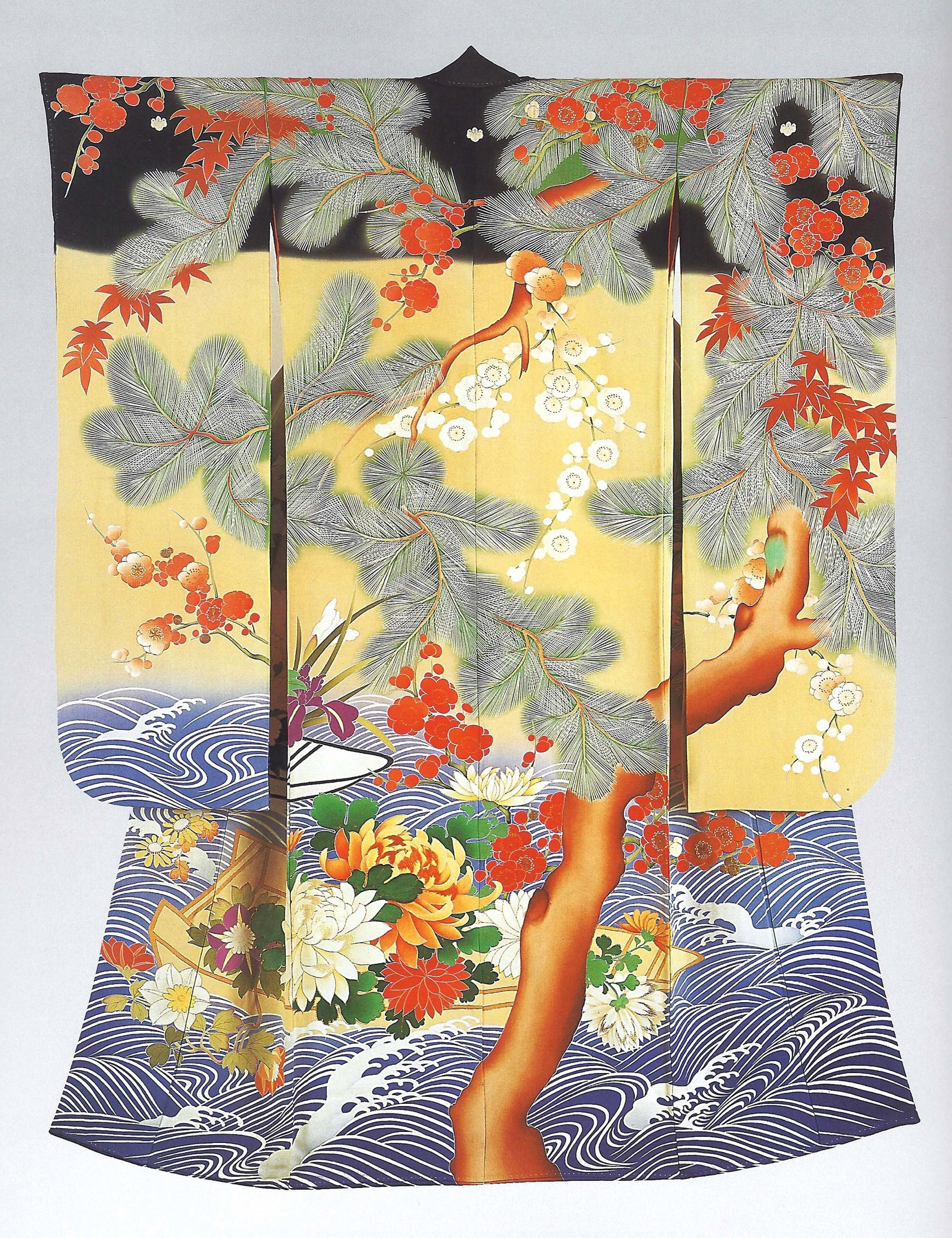
Kimono for a young woman (furisode), Japan, 1912-1926

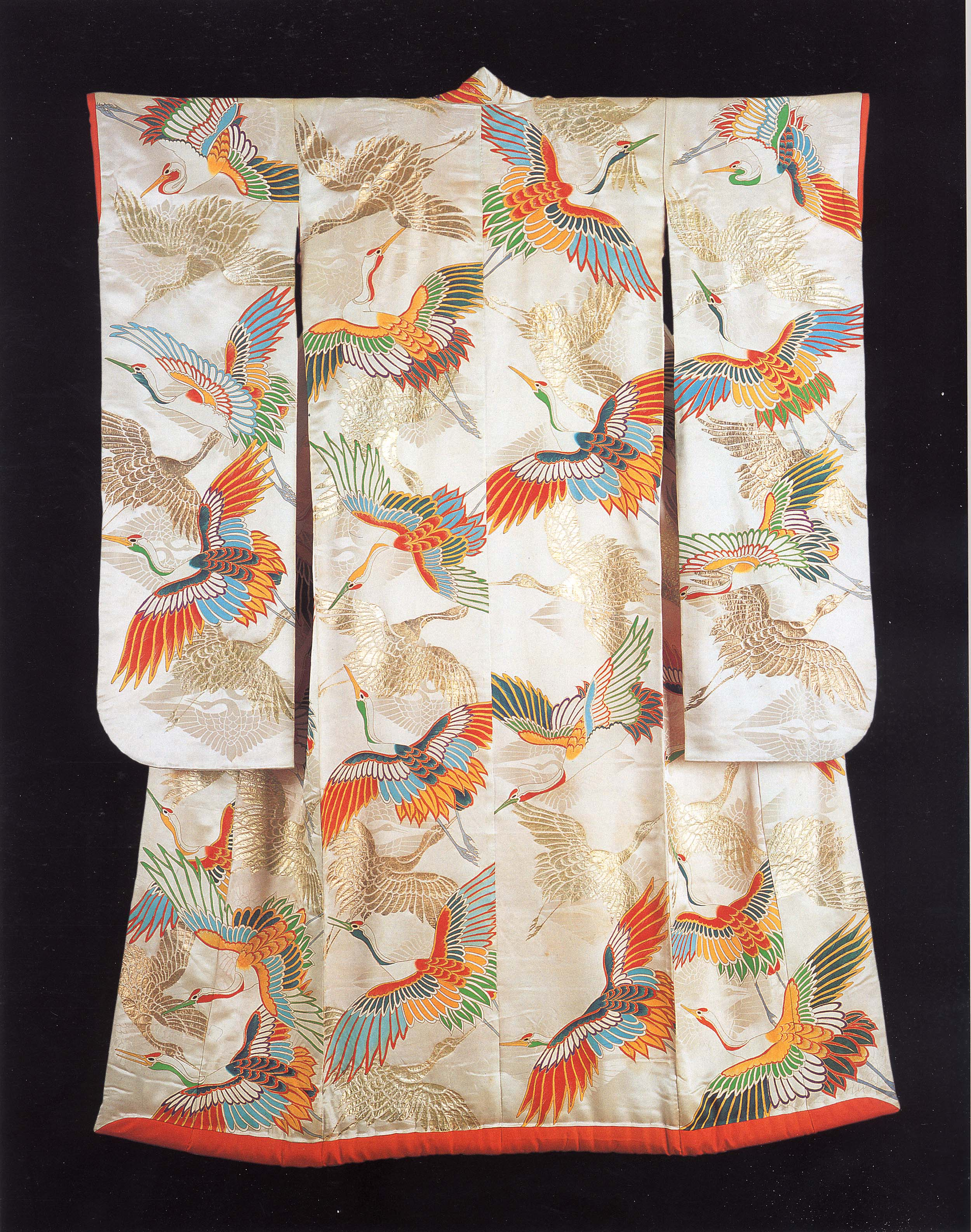
Outer kimono for a woman (uchikake), Japan, 1920-1930

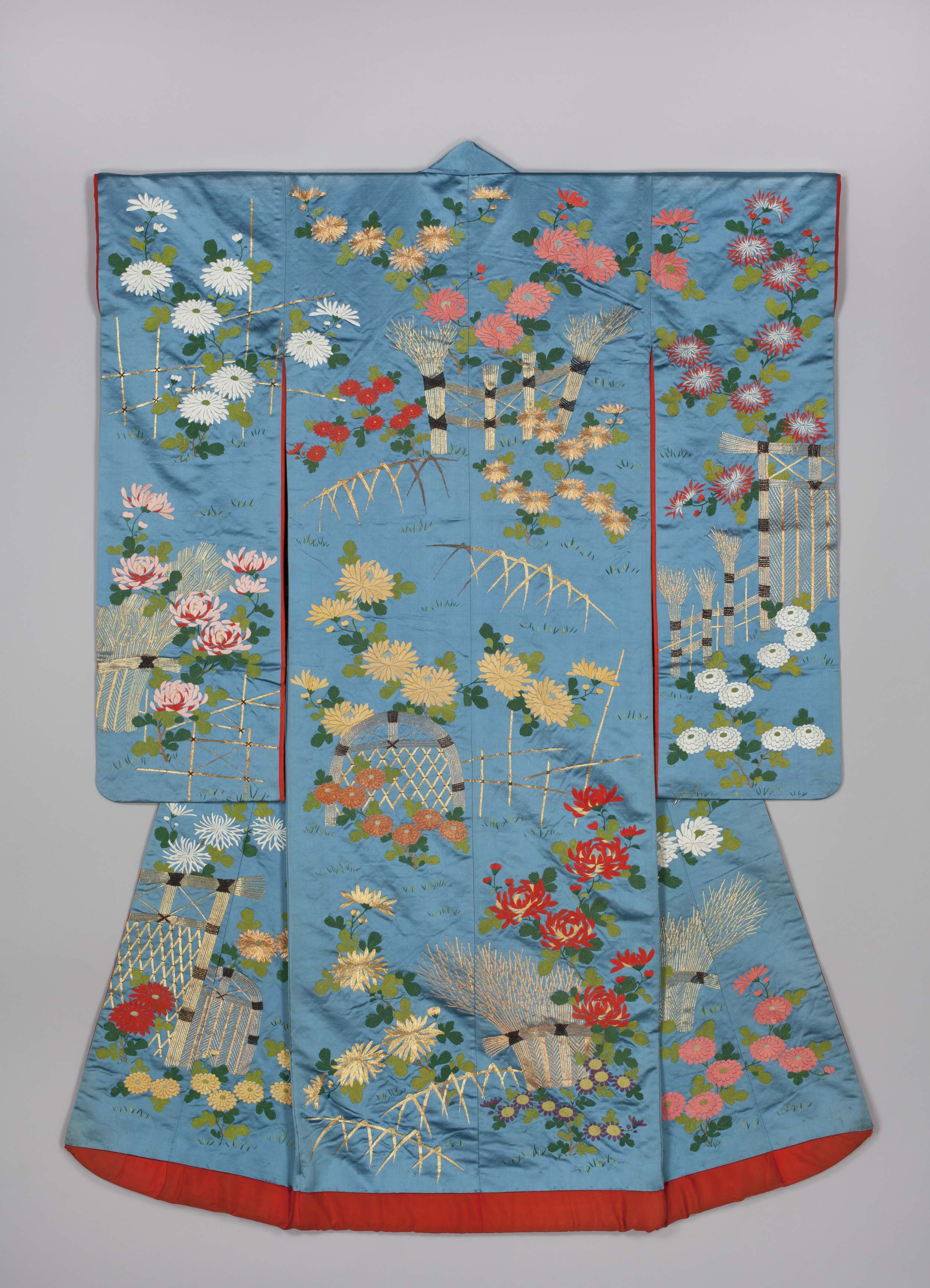
Outer kimono for a young woman (uchikake), Japan, 1840-1870

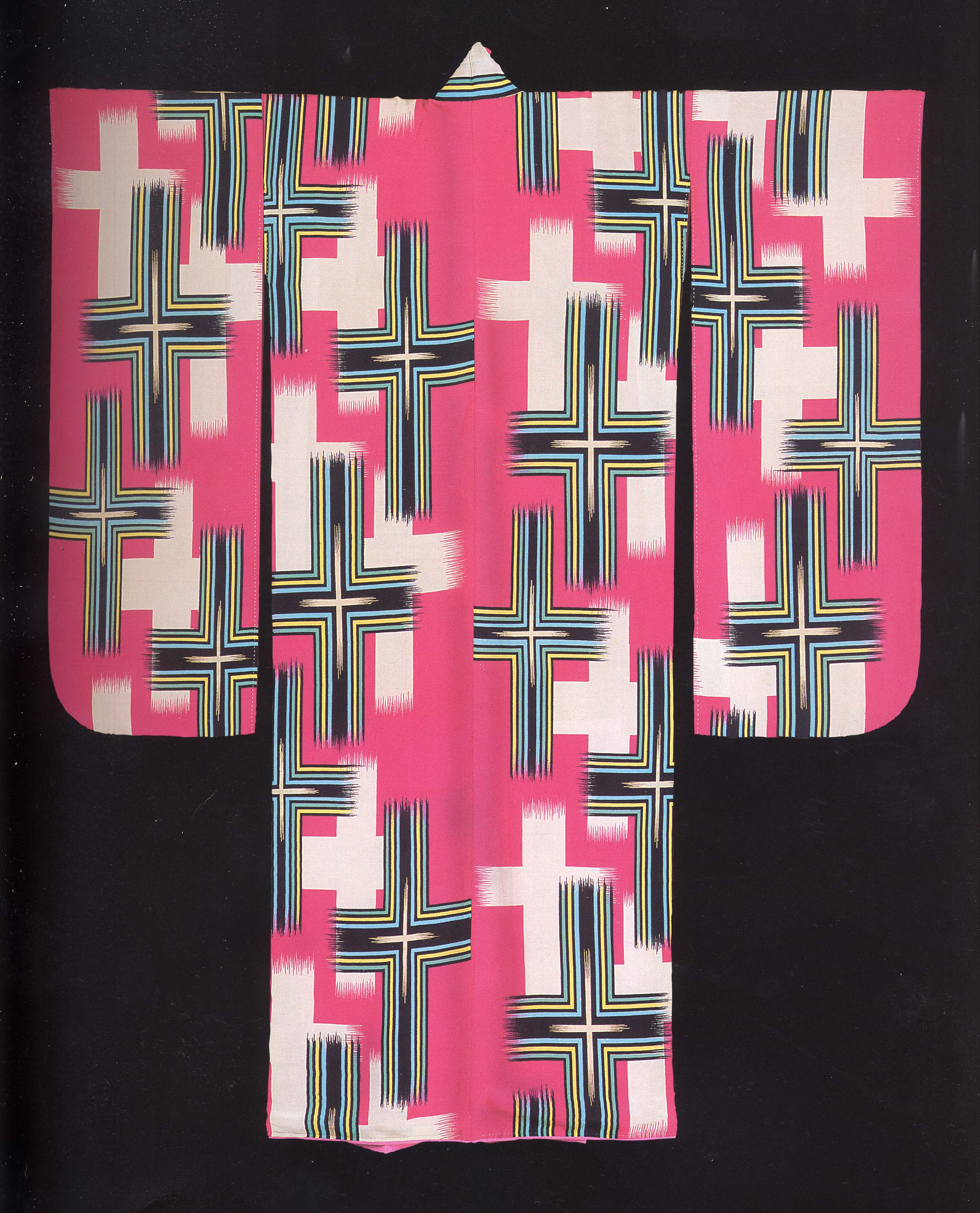
Kimono for a girl (furisode), Japan, 1920-1940

=== Swedish Textiles (1700–1900) ===
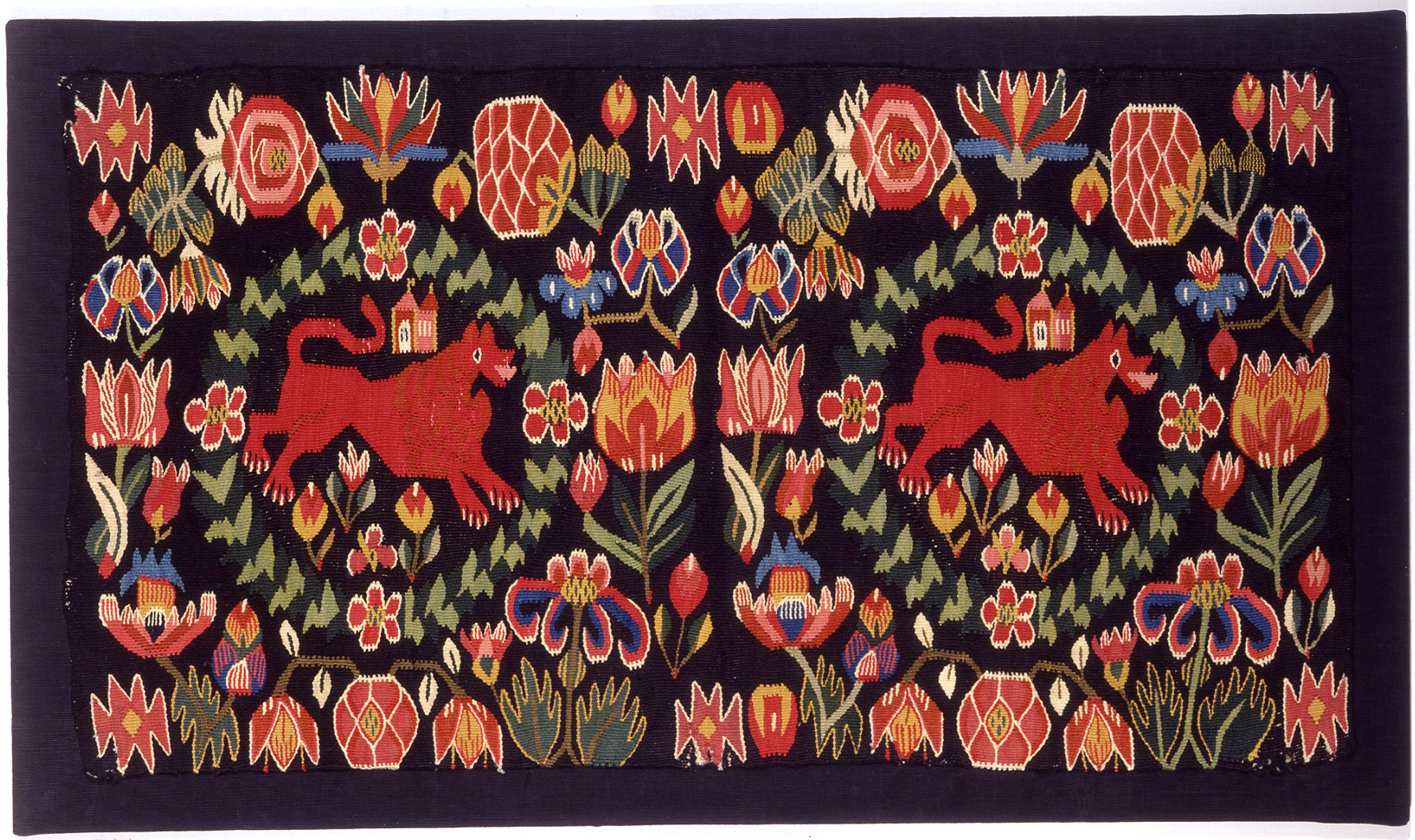
Carriage Cushion Cover (Two Lions in Floral Roundels), Sweden, Scania, Bara district, late 18th century

The collection consists mostly of textile panels, cushion and bed covers from the Scania region of southern Sweden, dating in the main from a hundred-year-old period of the mid-18th to mid-19th centuries. The majority of the pieces in the collection were made for wedding ceremonies in the region. While they played a part in the ceremonies, they were also a reflection of the artistry and skill of the weaver. Their designs often consist of symbolic illustrations of fertility and long life. The entire collection is made up of 100 pieces. In 2008 it was described as "the only extensive collection of Swedish flatweaves outside the country".

Exhibitions drawing exclusively from the collection have been held at the Swedish Cultural Institute in Paris and Boston University Art Gallery.

=== Spanish Damascene Metalwork (1850–1900) ===
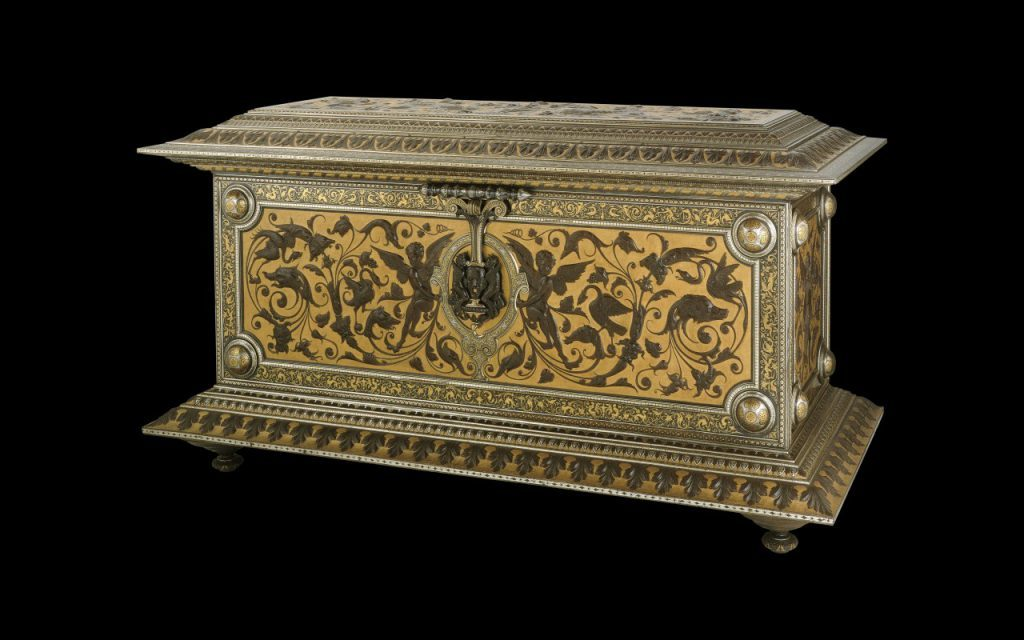
Iron Cassone, Spain, Eibar, 1871

One of the largest collections of its kind, the Spanish Metalwork collection pays homage to the Zuloaga family, which played a major part in the preservation of damascening in Spain. The collection contains pieces created by Plácido Zuloaga between 1834 and 1910. Some of the pieces, such as a giant iron cassone (marriage chest), were originally acquired by the 19th-century English collector, Alfred Morrison. The entire collection comprises over 150 pieces, 22 of which are signed by Plácido Zuloaga.

At the opening of the Khalili Zuloaga exhibition at the Victoria and Albert Museum in London, its then director Alan Borg said it was "a landmark in the study of 19th-century Spanish decorative art". Other exhibitions also drawing exclusively from the collection have been held at the Bilbao Fine Arts Museum and the Alhambra Palace in Granada.

=== Enamels of the World (1700–2000) ===
The collection consists of over 1,500 pieces and showcases the global significance and evolution of enamelling, covering a 300-year period. It is the most comprehensive private collection of its kind. The uniqueness of the collection lies in its geographic, artistic and historical range, including pieces from China, Japan, Islamic countries and Europe. Objects include the enamelled chariot belonging to the Indian Maharaja of Bhavnagar and a painted enamel throne table with the seal mark of the 18th century Chinese Qianlong emperor. Other objects include presentation chargers, jewellery, miniatures and ornamental pieces.

At the 2009–10 Enamels of the world exhibition held at the State Hermitage Museum, its director Mikhail Piotrovsky said "Unique in its scope, the Collection reveals the remarkable technical achievements of the enamellers and encourages a greater awareness of the range of their activity."

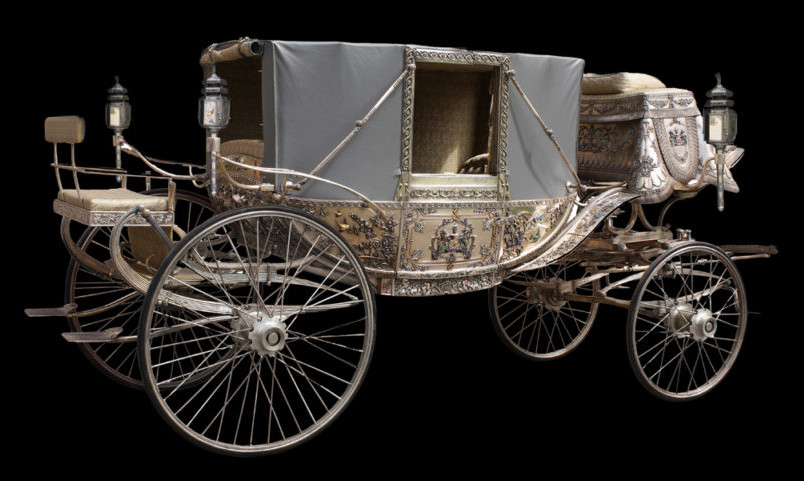
Enamelled chariot belonging to the Indian Maharaja of Bhavnagar

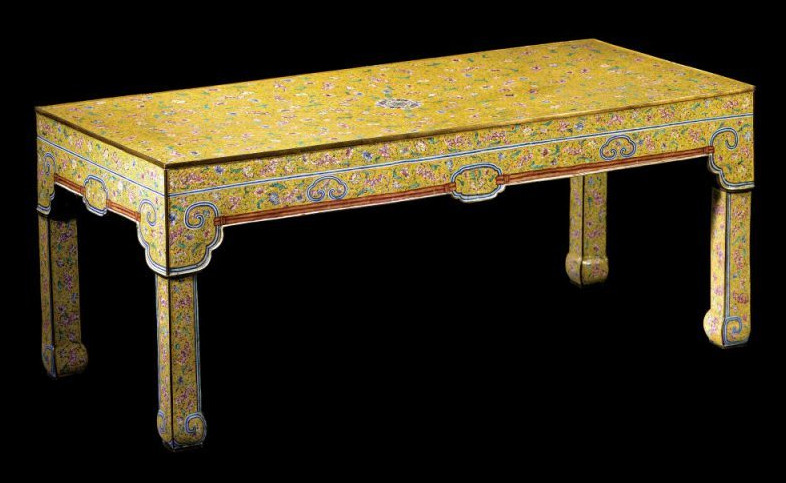
Painted enamel throne table with the seal mark of the Qianlong emperor

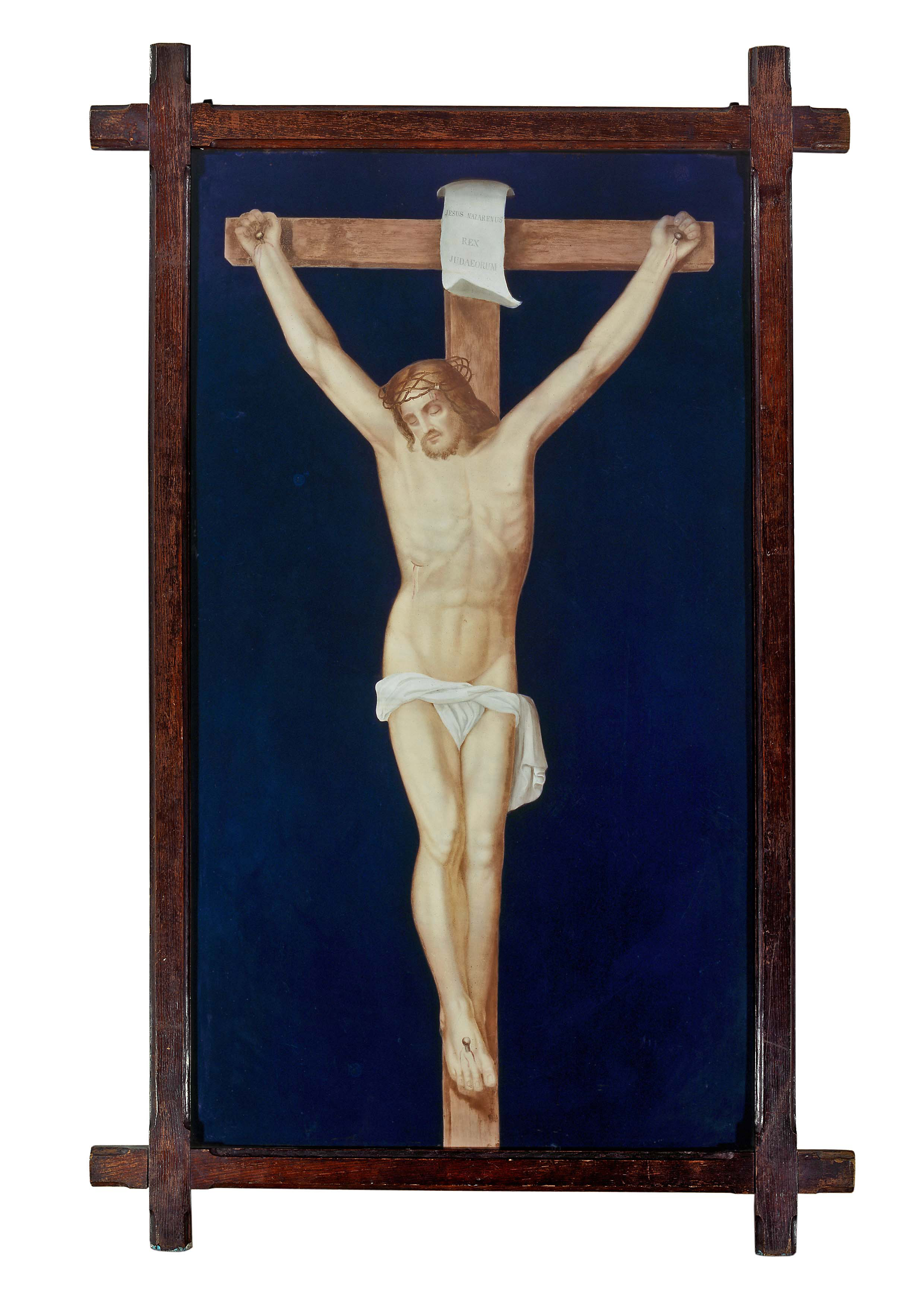
19th-century Limoges plaque depicting the crucifixion, the largest known single-piece enamel painting

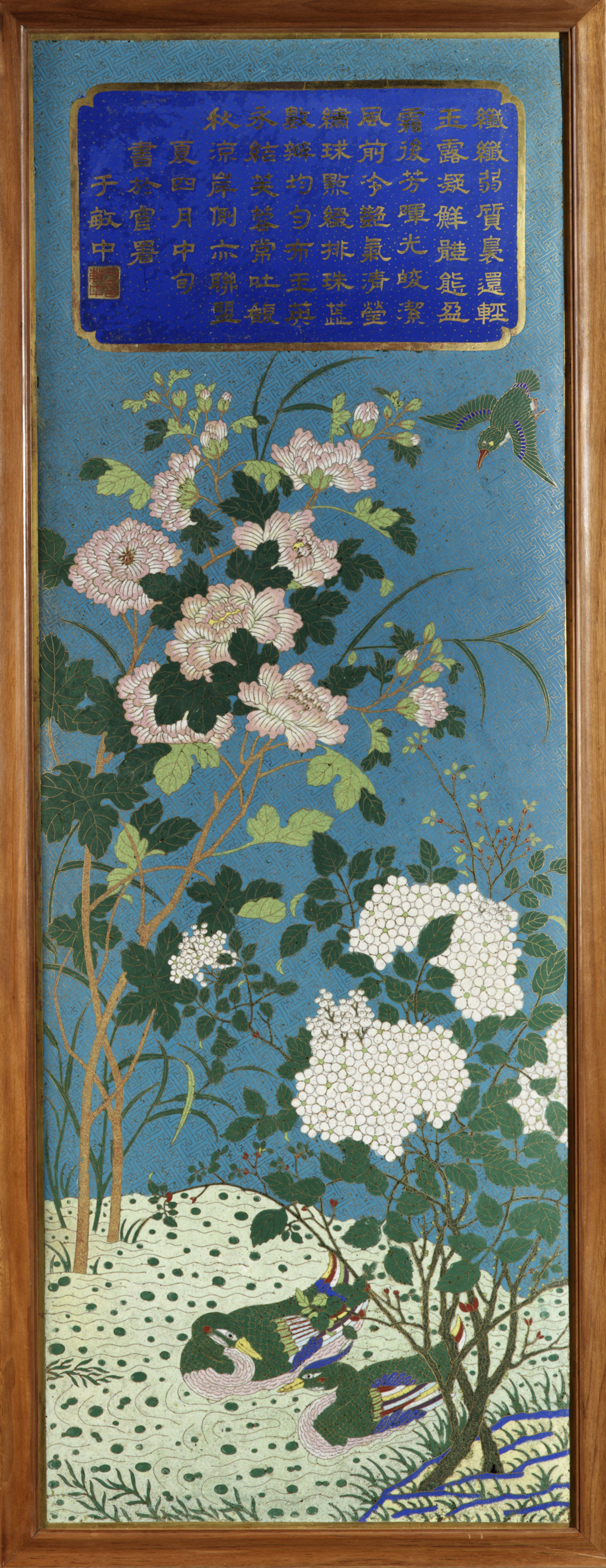
Panel from a set of eight bearing poems by Yu Minzhong

== Publications ==
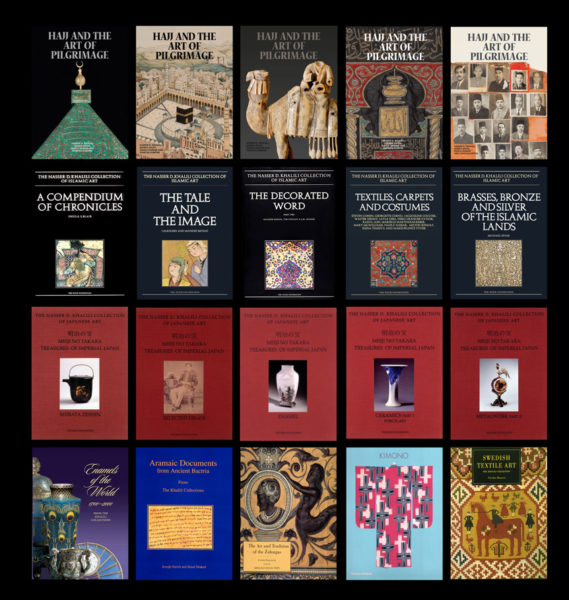
A selection of the over 100 publications representing the eight collections

The Khalili Collections are represented in 70 publications, including exhibition catalogues, with work in progress to extend this to 100. The total costs associated with the conservation, research, scholarship, and publication of the collections are estimated to be in the tens of millions of pounds.

=== Islamic art ===
- Déroche, François (1992). Volume I – The Abbasid Tradition: Qur'ans of the 8th to the 10th centuries AD. The Nour Foundation. ISBN 9781874780519.
- James, David (1992). Volume II – The Master Scribes: Qur'ans of the 10th to 14th centuries AD. The Nour Foundation. ISBN 9781874780526.
- James, David (1992). Volume III – After Timur: Qur'ans of the 15th and 16th centuries. The Nour Foundation. ISBN 9780197276020.
- Bayani, Manijeh; Contadini, Anna; Stanley, Tim (1999). Volume IV, Part I – The Decorated Word: Qur'ans of the 17th to 19th centuries. The Nour Foundation. ISBN 9780197276037.
- Bayani, Manijeh; Contadini, Anna; Stanley, Tim (2009). Volume IV, Part II – The Decorated Word: Qur'ans of the 17th to 19th centuries. The Nour Foundation. ISBN 9781874780540.
- Safwat, Nabil F. (1996). Volume V – The Art of the Pen: Calligraphy of the 14th to 20th Centuries. The Nour Foundation. ISBN 9780197276044.
- Khan, Geoffrey (1993). Volume VI – Bills, Letters and Deeds: Arabic Papyri of the 7th to 11th Centuries. The Nour Foundation. ISBN 9781874780564.
- Freeman, Deborah (1993). Volume VII – Learning, Piety and Poetry. Manuscripts from the Islamic world. The Nour Foundation. ISBN 9781874780847.
- Leach, Linda York (1998). Volume VIII – Paintings from India. The Nour Foundation. ISBN 9780197276242.
- Grube, Ernst J. (1994). Volume IX – Cobalt and Lustre: The first centuries of Islamic pottery. The Nour Foundation. ISBN 9780197276075.
- Grube, Ernst J. (2007). Volume X – A Rival to China. Later Islamic pottery. The Nour Foundation. ISBN 9781874780878.
- Spink, Michael (1992). Volume XI – Brasses, Bronze & Silver of the Islamic Lands, Part I and II. The Nour Foundation. ISBN 9781874780885.
- Maddison, Francis (1997). Volume XII – Science, Tools & Magic: Body and Spirit, Mapping the Universe, Part I and Mundane Bodies, Part II. The Nour Foundation. ISBN 9780197276105.
- Bayani, Manijeh (1997). Volume XIII – Seals and Talismans. The Nour Foundation. ISBN 9781874780779.
- Cohen, Steven (31 December 2011). Volume XIV – Textiles, Carpets and Costumes, Part I and II. The Nour Foundation. ISBN 9781874780786.
- Goldstein, Sidney M. (2005). Volume XV – Glass: From Sasanian antecedents to European imitations. The Nour Foundation. ISBN 9781874780502.
- Wenzel, Marian (1992). Volume XVI – Ornament and Amulet: Rings of the Islamic Lands. The Nour Foundation. ISBN 9780197276143.
- Spink, Michael; Ogden, Jack (2013). Volume XVII – The Art of Adornment: Jewellery of the Islamic lands. The Nour Foundation. ISBN 9781874780861.
- Carvalho, Pedro Moura (2010). Volume XVIII – Gems and Jewels of Mughal India. Jewelled and enamelled objects from the 16th to 20th centuries. The Nour Foundation. ISBN 9781874780724.
- Vardanyan, Aram R. (2022). Volume XIX – Dinars and Dirhams. Coins of the Islamic lands. The early period, Part I. The Nour Foundation. ISBN 9781874780823.
- Vardanyan, Aram R. (2022). Volume XX – Dinars and Dirhams. Coins of the Islamic lands. The later period, Part II. The Nour Foundation. ISBN 9781874780830.
- Alexander, David (1992). Volume XXI – The Arts of War: Arms and Armour of the 7th to 19th centuries. The Nour Foundation. ISBN 9781874780618.
- Khalili, Nasser D.; Robinson, B. W.; Stanley, Tim (1996). Volume XXII – Lacquer of the Islamic Lands, Part I. The Nour Foundation. ISBN 9781874780625.
- Khalili, Nasser D.; Robinson, B. W.; Stanley, Tim (1997). Volume XXII – Lacquer of the Islamic Lands, Part II. The Nour Foundation. ISBN 9781874780632.
- Vernoit, Stephen (1997). Volume XXIII – Occidentalism. Islamic Art in the 19th Century. The Nour Foundation. ISBN 9780197276204.
- Pinder-Wilson, Ralph; Chida-Razvi, Mehreen (28 April 2006). Volume XXIV – Monuments and Memorials. Carvings and tile work from the Islamic world. The Nour Foundation. ISBN 9781874780854.
- Sims, Eleanor; Bayani, Manijeh; Stanley, Tim (28 February 2006). Volume XXV, Part I – The Tale and the Image. Illustrated manuscripts and album paintings from Iran and Turkey (Part One). The Nour Foundation. ISBN 9781874780809.
- Rogers, J. M.; Bayani, Manijeh (31 December 2017). Volume XXV, Part II – The Tale and the Image. Illustrated manuscripts and album paintings from Iran and Turkey (Part Two). The Nour Foundation. ISBN 9781874780816.
- Blair, Shelia (1995). Volume XXVII – A Compendium of Chronicles: Rashid al-Din's illustrated history of the world. The Nour Foundation. ISBN 9781874780656.

=== Studies in the Khalili Collection – academic monographs ===
- Khan, Geoffrey (1992). Volume I – Selected Arabic Papyri. The Nour Foundation. ISBN 9781874780663.
- Soucek, Svat (1996). Volume II – Piri Reis and Turkish Mapmaking after Columbus, The Khalili Portolan Atlas. The Nour Foundation. ISBN 9781874780670.
- Sims-Williams, Nicholas (2012). Volume III – (Part One) Bactrian Documents from Northern Afghanistan, Legal and Economic Documents. The Nour Foundation. ISBN 9781874780922.
- Sims-Williams, Nicholas (2007). Volume III – (Part Two) Bactrian Documents from Northern Afghanistan, Letters and Buddhist Texts. The Nour Foundation. ISBN 9781874780908.
- Sims-Williams, Nicholas (2012). Volume III – (Part Three) Bactrian Documents from Northern Afghanistan, Plates. The Nour Foundation. ISBN 9781874780915.
- Goodwin, Tony (2005). Volume IV – Arab-Byzantine Coinage. The Nour Foundation. ISBN 9781874780755.
- Khan, Geoffrey (2007). Volume V – Arabic Documents from Early Islamic Khurasan. The Nour Foundation. ISBN 9781874780717.
- Chaldecott, Nada (2020). Volume VI – Turcoman Jewellery. The Nour Foundation. ISBN 9781874780939.

=== Aramaic documents ===
- Naveh, Joseph; Shaked, Shaul (2012). Aramaic Documents from Ancient Bactria. Khalili Family Trust. ISBN 9781874780748.

=== Japanese art of the Meiji period ===
- Impey, Oliver; Fairley, Malcolm (1995). Volume I – MEIJI NO TAKARA – Treasures of Imperial Japan; Selected Essays. Kibo Foundation. ISBN 9781874780014.
- Impey, Oliver; Fairley, Malcolm (1995). Volume II – MEIJI NO TAKARA – Treasures of Imperial Japan; Metalwork Parts One & Two. Kibo Foundation. ISBN 9781874780021.
- Impey, Oliver; Fairley, Malcolm (1995). Volume III – MEIJI NO TAKARA – Treasures of Imperial Japan; Enamel. Kibo Foundation. ISBN 9781874780038.
- Impey, Oliver; Fairley, Malcolm; Earle, Joe (1995). Volume IV – MEIJI NO TAKARA – Treasures of Imperial Japan; Lacquer Parts One & Two. Kibo Foundation. ISBN 9781874780045.
- Impey, Oliver; Fairley, Malcolm (1995). Volume V, Part I – MEIJI NO TAKARA – Treasures of Imperial Japan; Ceramics Part One: Porcelain. Kibo Foundation. ISBN 9781874780052.
- Impey, Oliver; Fairley, Malcolm (1995). Volume V, Part II – MEIJI NO TAKARA – Treasures of Imperial Japan; Ceramics Part Two: Earthenware. Kibo Foundation. ISBN 9781874780069.
- Earle, Joe (1995). Volume VI – MEIJI NO TAKARA – Treasures of Imperial Japan; Masterpieces by Shibata Zeshin. Kibo Foundation. ISBN 9781874780083.

=== Japanese kimono ===
- Jackson, Anna (2015). Kimono: The Japanese Art of Pattern and Fashion. Thames & Hudson. ISBN 9780500518021.

=== Swedish textile art ===
- Hansen, Viveka; Institutet för Kulturforskning (1996). Swedish Textile Art: Traditional Marriage Weavings from Scania: The Khalili Collection. Nour Foundation. ISBN 9781874780076.

=== Spanish damascene metalwork ===
- Lavin, James D.; Larrañaga, Ramiro (1997). The Art and Tradition of the Zuloagas: Spanish Damascene from the Khalili Collection. Khalili Family Trust. ISBN 9781874780113.

=== Enamels of the world ===
- Williams, Haydn (2009). Enamels of the World, 1700-2000: The Khalili Collections. Khalili Family Trust. ISBN 9781874780175.

== Exhibitions ==
The following exhibitions were drawn exclusively from the Khalili Collections.

=== Islamic art ===
This collection was the basis in 2008 for the first comprehensive exhibition of Islamic art to be staged in the Middle East, at the Emirates Palace in Abu Dhabi. This was also the largest exhibition of Islamic art held anywhere up to that date. Exhibitions drawing exclusively from the collection have been held at Art Gallery of New South Wales in Sydney, the Institut du Monde Arabe in Paris and the Nieuwe Kerk in Amsterdam as well as at many other museums and institutions worldwide.

Empire of the Sultans: Ottoman Art from the Khalili Collection

- July – Sep 1995 Musee Rath, Geneva, Switzerland
- July – Oct 1996 Brunei Gallery, School of Oriental and African Studies, London, UK
- Dec 1996 – June 1997 Israel Museum, Jerusalem, Israel
- Feb – Apr 2000 Society of the Four Arts, Palm Beach, Florida, USA

Marvels of the East: Indian Paintings of the Mughal Period from the Khalili Collection

- May – July 2000, Tel Aviv Museum of Art, Israel

Empire of the Sultans: Ottoman Art from the Khalili Collection

- July – Oct 2000 Detroit Institute of Arts, Detroit, Michigan, USA
- Oct 2000 – Jan 2001 Albuquerque Museum of Art and History, Albuquerque, New Mexico, USA
- Jan – Apr 2001 Portland Art Museum, Portland, Oregon, USA
- Aug – Oct 2001 Asian Art Museum of San Francisco, San Francisco, California, USA
- Oct 2001 – Jan 2002 Bruce Museum of Arts and Science, Greenwich, Connecticut, USA
- Feb – Apr 2002 Milwaukee Art Museum, Milwaukee, Wisconsin, USA
- May – July 2002 North Carolina Museum of Art, Raleigh, North Carolina, USA
- Aug 2002 – Jan 2003 Museum of Art, Brigham Young University, Provo, Utah, USA

Ornements de la Perse: Islamic Patterns in 19th Century Europe

- Oct – Dec 2002 Leighton House Museum, London, UK

Empire of the Sultans: Ottoman Art from the Khalili Collection

- Feb – Apr 2003 Oklahoma City Museum of Art, Oklahoma City, Oklahoma, USA
- May – Aug 2003 Frist Center for the Visual Arts, Nashville, Tennessee, USA
- Aug – Nov 2003 Museum of Arts and Sciences, Macon, Georgia, USA
- Nov 2003 – Feb 2004 Frick Art and Historical Center, Pittsburgh, Pennsylvania, USA

The Arts of Islam: Treasures from the Nasser D. Khalili Collection

- June – Sep 2007 Art Gallery of New South Wales, Sydney, Australia
- Jan – May 2008 Gallery One, Emirates Palace, Abu Dhabi, UAE
- Oct 2009 – Mar 2010 Institut du monde arabe, Paris, France

Passion for Perfection: Islamic Art from the Khalili Collection

- Dec 2010 – Apr 2011 Nieuwe Kerk, Amsterdam, Netherlands

=== Japanese art ===
Japanese Imperial Craftsmen: Meiji Art from the Khalili Collection

- Sep 1994 – Jan 1995 British Museum, London, UK

Treasures of Imperial Japan: Ceramics from the Khalili Collection

- Oct 1994 – Jan 1995 National Museum of Wales, Cardiff, UK

Shibata Zeshin: Masterpieces of Japanese Lacquer from the Khalili Collection

- Apr – Oct 1997 National Museums of Scotland, Edinburgh, UK

Splendors of Meiji: Treasures of Imperial Japan

- Apr – Oct 1999 First USA Riverfront Arts Centre, Wilmington, Delaware, USA

Shibata Zeshin: Masterpieces of Japanese Lacquer from the Khalili Collection

- Oct – Nov 1999 Toyama Sato Art Museum, Toyama, Japan
- Nov 2000 – Mar 2001 Roemer and Pelizaeus Museum, Hildesheim, Germany

Splendors of Imperial Japan: Arts of the Meiji Period from the Khalili Collection

- June – Sep 2002 Portland Art Museum, Portland, Oregon, USA

Splendors of Imperial Japan: Masterpieces from the Khalili Collection

- Sep 2004 – Feb 2005 Israel Museum, Jerusalem, Israel

Wonders of Imperial Japan: Meiji Art from the Khalili Collection

- July – Oct 2006 Van Gogh Museum, Amsterdam, Netherlands

Meiji-Kunst & Japonismus: Aus der Sammlung Khalili

- Feb – June 2007 Kunsthalle Krems, Krems, Austria

Beyond Imagination: Treasures of Imperial Japan from The Khalili Collection, 19th to early 20th century

- July – October 2017 Moscow Kremlin Museums, Moscow, Russia

=== Spanish damascene metalwork ===
Plácido Zuloaga: Spanish Treasures from The Khalili Collection

- May 1997 – Jan 1998 Victoria and Albert Museum, London, UK

El Arte y Tradición de los Zuloaga: Damasquinado Español de la Colección Khalili

- May – Aug 2000 Museo de Bellas Artes, Bilbao, Spain
- Feb – Apr 2001 Alhambra Palace, Granada, Spain
- May – Sep 2001 Real Fundacion de Toledo, Toledo, Spain

Plácido Zuloaga: Meisterwerke in gold, silber und eisen damaszener–schmiedekunst aus der Khalili-Sammlung

- Apr – Aug 2003 Roemer and Pelizaeus Museum, Hildesheim, Germany

Metal Magic: Spanish Treasures from the Khalili Collection

- Nov 2011 – Apr 2012 Auberge de Provence, Valletta, Malta

=== Swedish Textiles ===
Swedish Textile Art: The Khalili Collection

- Feb – Mar 1996 IK Foundation, Pildammarnas Vattentorn, Malmo, Sweden

Textiles de Scanie des XVIII et XIX Siècles dans la Collection Khalili

- Mar – May 2000 Swedish Cultural Centre, Paris, France

A Monument to Love: Swedish Marriage Textiles from the Khalili Collection

- Sep – Oct 2003 Boston University Art Gallery, Boston, Massachusetts, USA

=== Enamels of the world ===
Enamels of the World 1700–2000 from the Khalili Collection

- Dec 2009 – Apr 2010 State Hermitage Museum, St Petersburg, Russia

== Loans to museums and galleries ==
The collections have also loaned art for display in many countries.

Earthly Beauty, Heavenly Art: The Art of Islam, an exhibition of objects from the Islamic collection and the State Hermitage Museum was seen at

- Nieuwe Kerk, Amsterdam, Dec 1999 – Apr 2000
- State Hermitage Museum, St Petersburg, 2000 – Sep 2001
- Hermitage Rooms, Somerset House, London (as Heaven on Earth: Art From Islamic Lands) – Selected objects from the Khalili Collection and The State Hermitage Museum, March – August 2004

The Khalili Collections were the largest lender to the Hajj: Journey to the Heart of Islam exhibition at the British Museum from January to April 2012. This was the first major exhibition on the subject of the Hajj and its success inspired subsequent exhibitions at the National Museum of Ethnology in Leiden, the Tropenmuseum in Amsterdam, the Museum of Islamic Art in Doha, and the Arab World Institute in Paris which also drew from the Khalili Collections.

== Digitisation ==
Since 2019, the Khalili Collections have partnered with Wikimedia UK to share images of art works and improve Wikipedia articles. The collections have also provided images and text for Google Arts & Culture and Europeana. For the 2023 video game Assassin's Creed Mirage, the Khalili Collections were one of four partner institutions providing images for the game's educational database. An astrolabe and a statuette of a camel and rider were among the objects used to illustrate the game's setting of 9th century Baghdad.
