= Thattvi =

Thattvi is a surname meaning "of Thatta". Notable people having the surname include:

- Mir Ahmed Nasrallah Thattvi
- Mir Ali Sher Qaune Thattvi
- Muhammad Hashim Thattvi
- Muhammad Saleh Thattvi
- Tahir Muhammad Thattvi
