= Lala Bulhomal Lahori =

Indian metallurgist and instrument maker

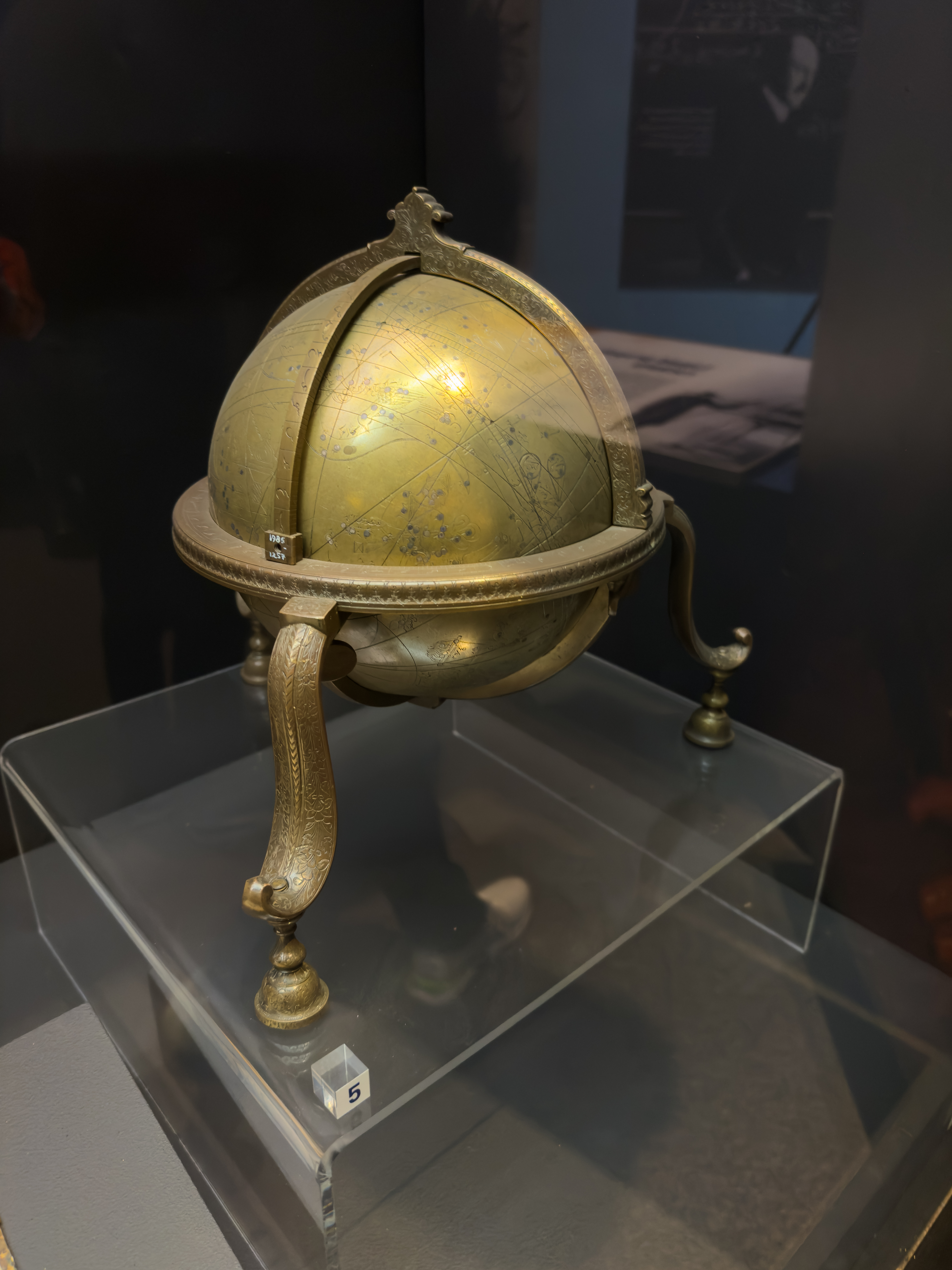
Celestial globe by Lala Bulhomal Lahori, 1842. Science Museum, London

Lāla Bulhomal (also Balhumal) Lāhorī was an Indian metallurgist and instrument maker from the city of Lahore in modern Pakistan. He was famous for crafting ornate astrolabes and celestial globes made in the tradition of Indo-Persian instruments. The toponymic surname Lāhorī indicates that he came from Lahore, while the prefix Lāla is an honorific indicating social status. His instruments, likely made between 1839 and 1851, were constructed mainly of brass, with inscriptions in Sanskrit, Devanagari, Arabic, and Persian. He is known to have produced at least twenty-eight such instruments. Forty-five instruments produced by Bulhomal and his associates are known to exist in museums and collections around the world; an 1849 astrolabe crafted for Sir Henry Miers Elliot, an officer of the East India Company, is now in the Science Museum, London.

Bulhomal's patron was Nihal Singh Ahluwalia, the Raja of Kapurthala (1837–1852), and his apprentices included Ghulām Qādir Kapūrthalī and Ustād Pīr Bakhsh Lāhorī. He may also have been associated with contemporary instrument maker Joshi Dharam Chand. Bulhomal's celestial globes were made both for decorative and instructive uses. The stars and constellations on these globes are labeled based on Arabic and Persian versions from Ptolemaic traditions. These seamless and hollow globes were constructed in the Lahore tradition by casting using the lost wax technique.

== See also ==
- Lahore family of astrolabists
