= Meridian altitude =

Meridian altitude is a method of celestial navigation to determine the latitude of an observer. It notes the altitude angle of an astronomical object above the horizon at culmination.

== Principle ==
Lines indicating solar meridian altitude over the course of a year, for three different cities, on the back of the Khalili astrolabe

Meridian altitude is the simplest calculation of celestial navigation. An observer determines their latitude by measuring the altitude of an astronomical object at the time of its meridian transit. A meridian is the imaginary plane running north–south and through the zenith, nadir, and celestial poles.

This is usually done with the equinox Sun at solar noon to determine the observer's latitude, but can be done with any celestial object. Solar noon is the time when the Sun crosses the meridian.

For example, imagine that the equinox Sun is overhead (at the zenith) at a point on the Equator (latitude 0°), and Observer A is standing at this point – the subsolar point. If he were to measure the height of the Sun above the horizon with a sextant, he would find that the altitude of the Sun was 90°. By subtracting this figure from 90°, he would find that the zenith distance of the Sun is 0°, which is the same as his latitude. If Observer B is standing at one of the geographical poles (latitude 90°N or 90°S), he would see the Sun on the horizon at an altitude of 0°. By subtracting this from 90°, he would find that the zenith distance is 90°, which is his latitude. Observer C at the same time is at latitude 20°N on the same meridian, i.e. on the same longitude as Observer A. His measured altitude would be 70°, and subtracting this from 90° gives a 20° zenith distance, which in turn is his latitude. In short, the zenith distance of a celestial object at meridian altitude is the difference in latitude between it and the observer.

== Methodology ==
The estimated time of meridian altitude of the heavenly object is extracted from the nautical almanac. A few minutes before this time the observer starts observing the altitude of the object with a sextant. The altitude of the object will be increasing and the observer will continually adjust the sextant to keep the reflected image of the object on the horizon. As the object passes the meridian a maximum altitude will be observed. The time in UTC of this is observed.

The altitude obtained is corrected for dip (the error caused by the observers height above the sea) and refraction to obtain the true altitude of the object above the horizon. This is then subtracted from 90° to obtain the angular distance from the position directly above to obtain the zenith distance.

A further correction must then be taken into account to counter the "wobble" of the earth's spin and rotation relative to the sun and planets. This is given in the declination for the body on a particular day in the year (also taken from the nautical almanac). If the declination of the body is in the opposite hemisphere (ie if you are in the northern hemisphere and the declination is in the southern hemisphere) then the declination must be subtracted from your true zenith distance, otherwise the declination is added.

== See also ==
- Celestial navigation
- Ex-meridian
- Haversine formula
- Intercept method
- Longitude by chronometer
