= Khalili astrolabe =

17th-century astrolabe made in Lahore

The Khalili astrolabe
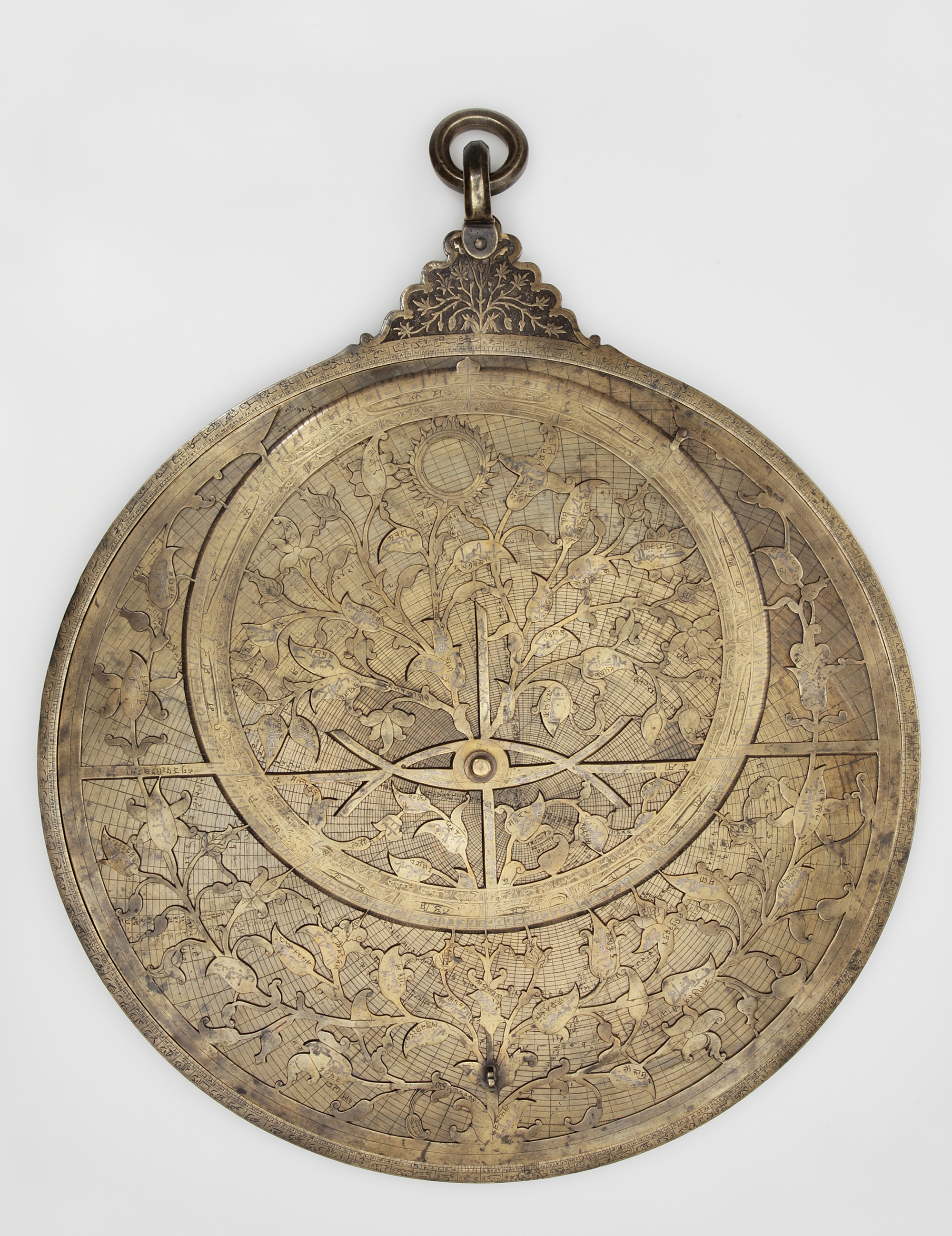
- Front of the astrolabe
- Artist: Ḍiyāʾ al-Dīn Muḥammad
- Completion date: Between 1648 and 1658
- Medium: brass
- Dimensions: 52.5 cm diameter (20.7 in)
- Location: Khalili Collection of Islamic Art
- Commissioner: Shah Jahan
- Accession: SCI 53
- Website: A large planispheric astrolabe made for Shah Jahan

The Khalili astrolabe is an unusually large 17th-century astrolabe made in Lahore for the Mughal emperor Shah Jahan. It has inscriptions in Arabic, Sanskrit, and Hindi, showing the influence of the Islamic and Hindu traditions of astronomy.

Although unsigned, it has been attributed to Ḍiyāʾ al-Dīn Muḥammad, maker of many astronomical instruments including one for Shah Jahan's successor, Aurangzeb. The Sanskrit and Hindi inscriptions are not original but were added by a later owner.

It is now in the Khalili Collection of Islamic Art, the world's largest private collection of Islamic art, after which it is named.

== Physical description ==
The mater (mother-plate into which other parts of the instrument fit) has a 52.5 centimetres (20.7 in) diameter and a thickness of 1.4 centimetres (0.55 in). At the top is a suspension bracket, decorated on the front with a floral pattern. On the back of the bracket is a scene of a falcon attacking small birds from above.

The rete is an overlay which shows the positions of the brightest stars. On this astrolabe, the rete is patterned in the form of a creeping vine whose leaves and flowers point to a total of 53 stars. The rete is 3 millimetres (0.12 in) thick at the centre and half that thickness at the rim. The stars on the rete are labelled in both Arabic and Sanskrit. The Arabic labels are written in very graceful calligraphy. The Sanskrit labels were added later, inexpertly, and in a way that erased the original maker's signature and the date of creation. Apart from the silver inlaid into the rete, all parts of the astrolabe are made of brass.

It has six different plates, each showing the stars visible at a different latitude. These fit into the mater and underneath the rete. The plates are 50.1 centimetres (19.7 in) in diameter. Each plate shows the length of the longest day at that latitude. Some give this time in hours and minutes; others use ghati, a Hindu unit of time equalling 24 minutes.

The alidade (plane for lining up with the Sun or a star), pin (to hold the different parts of the astrolabe together) and horse (a wedge that secures the pin) are missing.

== Academic study ==
The astrolabe was first published in 1997 by Francis Maddison, former curator of Oxford's History of Science Museum, in a volume of the Khalili Collection of Islamic Art's catalogue. Maddison dated its origin to the 17th century and described it as combining the Islamic and Hindu traditions of astrology and astronomy. David A. King of Johann Wolfgang Goethe University, in a review of the volume, raised doubts about some of its conclusions. He dated the astrolabe to the 1550s and attributed it to Maqsud Hirawi who worked for the emperor Humayun. He repeated this attribution when mentioning the astrolabe in other publications. King's observations were based on the catalogue's two photographs and short textual description. He described the astrolabe as "the pride of the collection" and said that a complete description of it "would be worth a Master's dissertation".

Engraved scene of birds fighting on the back of the astrolabe

In 2015, Sreeramula Rajeswara Sarma, a retired professor, conducted a physical examination of the Khalili Astrolabe. His findings, published in 2017, challenged some of Maddison's and King's conclusions. He found the engraved place name Shahjahanabad; this was the name used for Delhi once Shah Jahan moved the Mughal capital there in 1648. Sarma thus dated the astrolabe's origin to between 1648 and Shah Jahan's death in 1658. He ascribed it to Ḍiyāʾ al-Dīn Muḥammad of the Lahore family of scientific instrument-makers. He also linked the imagery of a falcon attacking a hoopoe to a letter Shah Jahan sent to the Sultan of Bijapur. Shah Jahan threatened the sultan that the Mughal Empire could, if smaller kingdoms did not accept the emperor's authority, tear them apart like a falcon savaging a hoopoe. A hoopoe is a small bird with a prominent crest, so it was used as a metaphor for a sultan who wears a crown but lacks military strength. On the basis of this connection, and on the overall quality and luxuriousness of the astrolabe, Sarma concluded that it was made for Shah Jahan. It was Sarma who introduced the name "The Khalili Astrolabe".

== Creator ==
Mater of the astrolabe, showing the gazetteer

Ḍiyāʾ al-Dīn Muḥammad (also written Ziauddin Muhammad) was one of the fourth generation of a family of scientific instrument makers working in Lahore. His great-grandfather, grandfather, father, uncle, and two cousins were all makers of astrolabes, celestial globes, or other astronomical instruments. The family were known for technically precise engraving and for innovative designs. They made each astrolabe individually, never by reusing moulds or any kind of mass-production. From at least as early as 1602, these makers worked with high-zinc brass that was not in industrial use in Europe until the nineteenth century.

The family benefited from the patronage of emperors and other noble clients. For the emperor Aurangzeb, Diya al-Din made a celestial globe that, when lit from within, projected the shapes of constellations as shadows.

== Inscriptions ==
Solar meridian altitudes for Agra, Delhi, and Lahore engraved on the back of the astrolabe

The Sanskrit inscriptions state that a new owner took possession of the astrolabe in 1701. A Hindu based in Delhi, he added further engravings, duplicating the numbers in Devanagari script and giving Sanskrit or Hindi equivalents for all the Arabic labels.

A gazetteer is inscribed on the inner face of the mater, giving Arabic or Persian names of 259 localities with their longitudes, latitudes, and day lengths. Gazetteers like this were frequently included on astrolabes made by Ḍiyāʾ al-Dīn Muḥammad; this is the largest example. The gazetteer is based on one created by the sultan and astronomer Ulugh Beg, with small changes.

The back of the astrolabe has three graphs of solar meridian altitudes for different latitudes. The latitudes 27°, 29°, and 32° north correspond to the cities of Agra, Delhi/Shahjahanabad, and Lahore. Around the edge are three clockwise angular scales, divided by fifths of a degree, single degrees, and divisions of three degrees. The three-degree angles are labelled with Abjad numerals, an Arabic system; Devanagari numerals have been fitted in around them where there is space.

The outer edge of the rete has four circular scales. These show 28 lunar mansions, twelve signs of the zodiac, individual degrees, and groups of three degrees. The signs of the zodiac are named in Sanskrit as well as Arabic.
