= Muhammad Saleh Thattvi =

Mughal craftsman

Celestial globe with Arabic and Sanskrit inscriptions, Khalili Collection of Islamic Art

Muhammad Saleh Thattvi (also spelled Muhammad Salih Tatah-wi and Muhammad Salih Tatawi) was a 17th-century Mughal craftsman known for making seamless celestial globes as well as astrolabes. His last name is a toponym implying that he was born in Thatta which is in present-day Pakistan. It is not known if this was also where he worked.

Some of his creations are preserved in collections in India, the UK, the US, and Pakistan. These include some that are signed and others that have been attributed to him by scholars.

== Works ==
In AH 1070 (1659–60 CE), Thattvi made a 21 centimetres (8.3 in) diameter celestial globe. It is now in the Red Fort Archaeological Museum in Delhi (inventory number 40-415). It uses silver inlaid points to show the position of about 1,018 stars. As no seams are visible in a photograph of it, it was likely made by the lost wax casting method.

Astrolabe dated AH 1077

Two more celestial globes are in the Khalili Collection of Islamic Art. The first, dated AH 1073 (1662 CE) has inventory number SCI 268. It has a diameter of 9.9 centimetres (3.9 in) and is plated with gold. The second, dated AH 1074 (1663–4 CE) has inventory number SCI 45. Its outer diameter is 27.3 centimetres (10.7 in) and it was also made with the lost wax casting process. It has inscriptions both in Arabic and in Sanskrit (in Devanagari script); the latter were added by another craftsman around a century after it was created. As with the Delhi globe, it represents about 1,108 stars with silver dots.

He is also known to have made at least four astrolabes:

- Dated AH 1072 (1661–2 CE), in a private collection in the USA;
- Dated AH 1074 (1663–4 CE), the Chhatrapati Shivaji Maharaj Vastu Sangrahalaya in India (inventory number F 209);
- Dated AH 1076 (1665–6 CE), the Victoria and Albert Museum in London, UK (inventory number IM.408-1924);
- Dated AH 1077 (1666–7 CE), the History of Science Museum, Oxford, UK (inventory number 33474).

Celestial globe plated with gold

Three more astrolabes are not signed but have been attributed to Thattvi on the basis of similarity to his known works. They are in the Khuda Bakhsh Oriental Public Library in India, the National Museum of Pakistan, and the Peabody Essex Museum in the USA.

== See also ==
- Lahore family of astrolabists
