= Astrodome (aeronautics) =

Window dome for astronomical navigation on airplanes

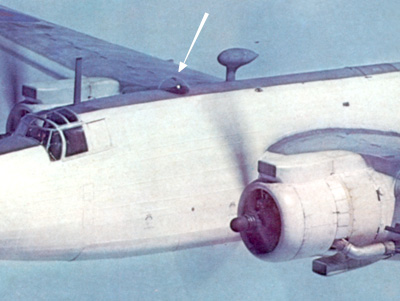
The astrodome (arrowed) on a Vickers Warwick B/ASR Mk 1

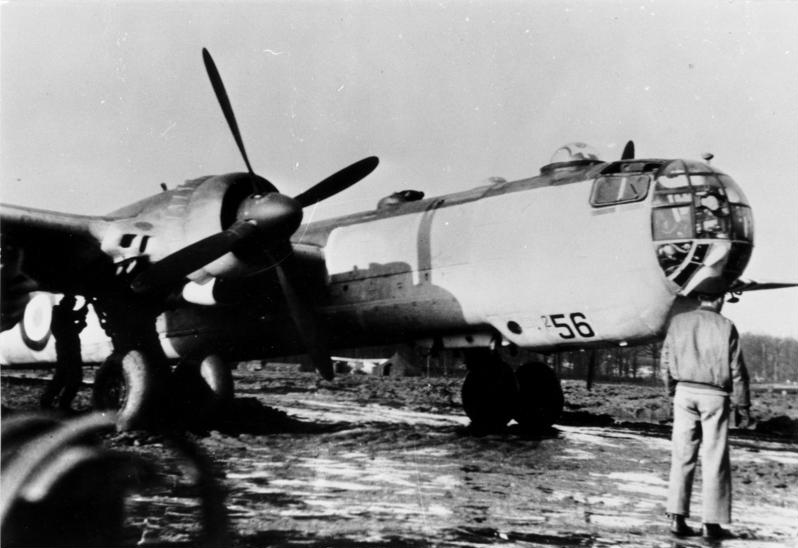
A Heinkel 177A’s dorsal gun-sighting "astrodome", just aft of the cockpit glazing

An astrodome is a hemispherical transparent dome that was installed in the cabin roof of certain aircraft. Such a dome would allow a trained navigator to perform astronavigation and thereby guide the aircraft at night without the aid of land-based visual references.

Astronavigation was a principal early method for attaining an aircraft's position during nighttime by referencing the stars. The practice of sighting stars using a sextant had been commonplace amongst navigators for hundreds of years aboard ships, and proved to be applicable to faster moving aircraft as well. The task required a 360-degree view of the celestial horizon, however. By installing an astrodome, such a view could be readily achieved. The Royal Air Force (RAF) adopted astronavigation techniques into standard navigator training during the late 1930s, both the methods used and the design of the sextant were adapted to better suit the aviation environment, while many aircraft ordered by the service would be furnished with astrodomes to enable navigators to use this technique.

During the Second World War, astronavigation became a critical ability used by various nations to conduct long distance flights at night, particularly strategic bombing campaigns. The RAF's choice to mainly operate its bombers at night meant that its crews were particularly dependent on astronavigation for finding their way to and from targets. The introduction of electronic means of navigation soon competed with astronavigation, although electronic techniques had their shortcomings as well.

== Use in aviation ==
Sporadic use of astronavigation in aviation can be found in numerous long distance flights performed during the 1920s and even amid the First World War. During these early days of aviation, those individual officers that chose to employ astronavigation often attempted to simplify the traditional procedures of marine navigators in this new operating context. Amid the 1930s, the Royal Air Force (RAF) became seriously interested in the widespread use of astronavigation for nighttime flights. During November 1937, astronavigation was formally endorsed to be a part of standard navigation procedure amongst general reconnaissance and twin-engine bomber pilots. Two years later, a specialised bubble sextant was designed for the service, which became a preferred tool for this form of navigation. Typically, there would be a suspension arm mounted in the vicinity of the astrodome, upon which the sextant could be mounted via a swivel clip affixed to the top of the instrument.

During the Second World War, astrodomes were prominent on many RAF and Commonwealth-operated multi-engined aircraft and on foreign aircraft ordered by them for their use, such as the Liberator and Dakota. Furthermore, numerous aircraft would be retrofitted with astrodomes to better facilitate operational use. For the RAF, it was particularly important for specific aircraft to possess astrodomes as the service had opted to perform the majority of its offensive operations over the continent under the cover of night, hindering conventional navigation by landmarks. On numerous aircraft, such as the Short Stirling four-engined heavy bomber, the astrodome was angled so that it could provide generous external views, including of ground positions, not only those relevant to the task of astronavigation, hence the facility was sometimes used for observation unrelated to navigation. Several Avro Lancasters were outfitted with a pair of astrodomes.

Similar hemispherical-shaped domes were also installed on some Second World War era heavy bombers for the purpose of sighting of their defensive gun turrets, particularly those that were remotely operated. Examples of such installations include the German Heinkel He 177A, which had a single forward dorsal dome to aim its remotely operated FDL 131 twin MG 131 dorsal turret, and the American Boeing B-29 Superfortress heavy bomber, which had used a dome in its complex sighting system for its quartet of remote gun turrets. On the B-29, the bonding of the astrodome was designed so that it would generate only minimal radio interference via static electric discharges.

Several RAF bombers, such as the Stirling, were equipped with an astrograph; this device, installed above the navigator's table, projected lines of equal altitude for two stars at any one time. The navigator only needed to observe Polaris from this point to achieve a three-star fix. While deemed to be useful in astronavigation, by this time inertial guidance systems were becoming increasingly available; these devices would eventually displace the use of astronavigation and thus aircraft would increasingly be built without astrodomes or other accommodations for this means of navigation. Astrodomes added drag and could fail under pressurization (called a blowout) which has occurred in several instances often with fatal consequences for the navigator. Efforts were made to reduce this danger such as retractable periscopic sextants.

Early jet-powered bombers, such as the English Electric Canberra and the V bombers, while furnished with internal navigation systems, would often still be navigable by astronavigation. During the early 1960s, astrodomes were still being employed in the USMC Lockheed Hercules GV-1 (later designated as C-130); the navigator was able to employ a bubble sextant hung from a hook in the middle of the dome. The USMC operated its Aerial Navigation School at MCAS Cherry Point, NC with graduates receiving their designation and wings as an Aerial Navigator.

The Lockheed SR-71 Blackbird, a high speed aerial reconnaissance aircraft, was furnished with a complex array of navigation systems, which included an astro-inertial guidance system (ANS) to correct deviations produced by the inertial navigation system via a series of celestial observations. This system performed its observations of the stars above the aircraft via a circular quartz glass window set onto the upper fuselage. Its "blue light" source star tracker, which could see stars during both day and night, would continuously track a variety of stars as the aircraft's changing position brought them into view. The system's digital computer ephemeris contained data on a list of stars used for celestial navigation: the list first included 56 stars, and was later expanded to 61.

== Use at sea ==
During the postwar era, the use of the astrodome spread to other vehicles, including a number of ocean-going vessels. In particular, they found popularity on long distance racing yachts, especially those that were being used in solo racing.

Eric Tabarly, record-breaking winner of the 1964 OSTAR single-handed transatlantic race, and former French Aéronavale (Fleet air arm) pilot, had fitted his revolutionary lightweight ketch-rigged racer Pen Duick II with an astrodome scavenged from a decommissioned Short Sunderland flying boat. Not only could he use it for sextant astro-navigation, but it provided a sheltered place from which he could steer his yacht during a stormy race. This was quite useful, as his wind-vane autopilot (also derived from aeronautical technology) had broken down.

== See also ==
- Index of aviation articles
