= Alioth =

Star in the constellation Ursa Major

- Location of Alioth (circled)

Observation data Epoch J2000 Equinox ICRS
- Constellation: Ursa Major
- Right ascension: 12^{h} 54^{m} 01.74959^{s}
- Declination: +55° 57′ 35.3627″
- Apparent magnitude (V): 1.77

Characteristics
- Spectral type: A1III-IVp kB9
- U−B color index: +0.02
- B−V color index: −0.02
- Variable type: α^{2} CVn

Astrometry
| Radial velocity (R_{v}) | −9.3 km/s |
| Proper motion (μ) | RA: +111.91 mas/yr Dec.: −8.24 mas/yr |
| Parallax (π) | 39.51±0.20 mas |
| Distance | 82.6 ± 0.4 ly (25.3 ± 0.1 pc) |
| Absolute magnitude (M_{V}) | −0.2 |

Details
| Mass | 2.91 M_{☉} |
| Radius | 4.29+0.19 −0.21 R_{☉} |
| Luminosity | 104.4±9.3 L_{☉} |
| Surface gravity (log g) | 3.59 cgs |
| Temperature | 8,908±24 K |
| Metallicity [Fe/H] | +0.00 dex |
| Rotation | 5.088631(18) days |
| Rotational velocity (v sin i) | 33 km/s |
| Age | 300 Myr |

Other designations
- Alioth, Allioth, Aliath, ε UMa, 77 Ursae Majoris, BD+56°1627, FK5 483, GC 17518, HD 112185, HIP 62956, HR 4905, SAO 28553, PPM 33769

Database references
| SIMBAD | data |

Alioth /ˈæliɒθ/, also called Epsilon Ursae Majoris, is a star in the northern constellation of Ursa Major. The designation is Latinised from ε Ursae Majoris and abbreviated Epsilon UMa or ε UMa. Despite being designated "ε" (epsilon), it is the brightest star in the constellation and at magnitude 1.77 is the thirty-third brightest star in the sky.

It is the star in the tail of the bear closest to its body, and thus the star in the handle of the Big Dipper (or Plough) closest to the bowl. It is also a member of the large and diffuse Ursa Major moving group. Historically, the star was frequently used in celestial navigation in the maritime trade, because it is listed as one of the 57 navigational stars.^{[1]}

== Physical characteristics ==
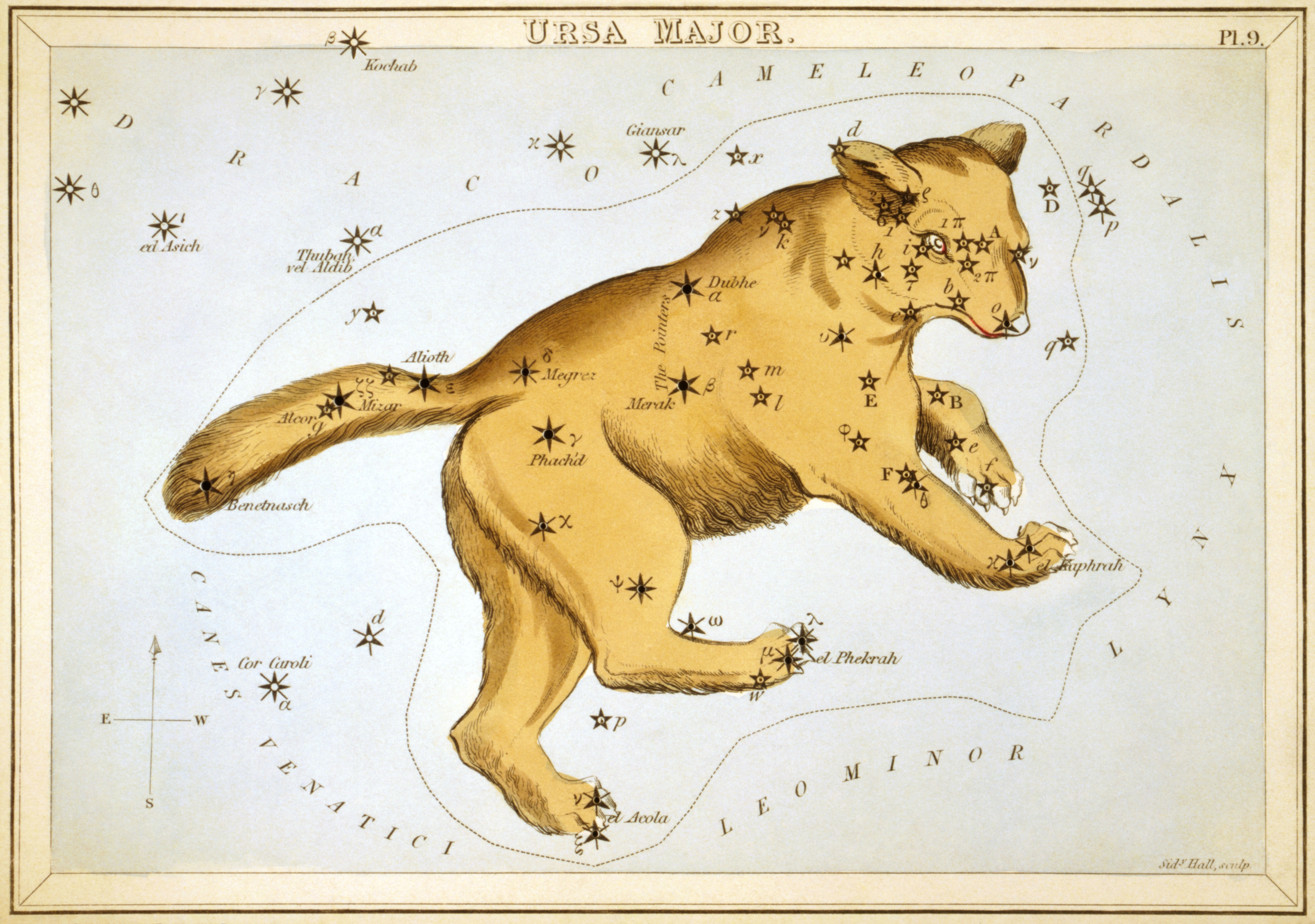
Book plate by Sidney Hall depicting Ursa Major's stars

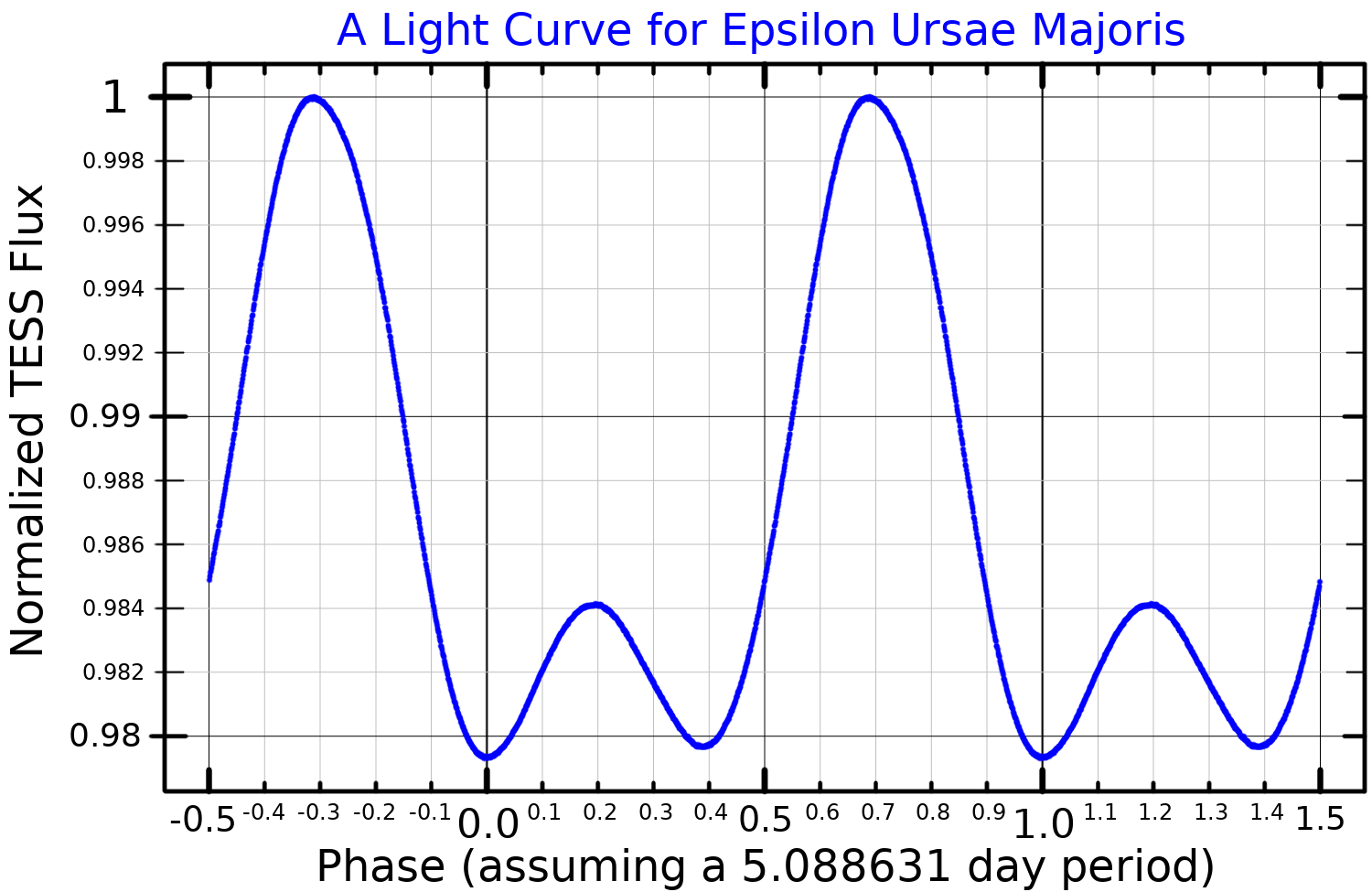
A light curve for Epsilon Ursae Majoris, plotted from TESS data

According to Hipparcos, Epsilon Ursae Majoris is 81 light-years (25 parsecs) from the Sun. Its spectral type is A1p; the "p" stands for peculiar, as its spectrum is characteristic of an α^{2} Canum Venaticorum variable. Epsilon Ursae Majoris, as a representative of this type, may harbor two interacting processes: first, the star's strong magnetic field separating different elements in its hydrogen 'fuel'; second, a rotation axis at an angle to the magnetic axis may be spinning different bands of magnetically sorted elements into the line of sight between Epsilon Ursae Majoris and the Earth. The intervening elements react differently at different frequencies of light as they whip in and out of view, causing Epsilon Ursae Majoris to have very strange spectral lines that fluctuate over a period of 5.1 days. The kB9 suffix to the spectral type indicates that the calcium K line is present and representative of a B9 spectral type even though the rest of the spectrum indicates A1.

Epsilon Ursae Majoris's rotational and magnetic poles are at almost 90 degrees to one another. Darker (denser) regions of chromium form a band at right angles to the equator.

It has long been suspected that Epsilon Ursae Majoris is a spectroscopic binary, possibly with more than one companion. A 2008 study suggested Alioth's 5.1-day variation may be due to a substellar object of about 14.7 Jupiter masses in an eccentric orbit (e=0.5) with an average separation of 0.055 astronomical units. It is now thought that the 5.1-day period is the rotation period of the star, and no companions have been detected using the most modern equipment. Observations of Alioth with the Navy Precision Optical Interferometer also did not detect a companion.

Epsilon Ursae Majoris has a relatively weak magnetic field for a variable of this type, 15 times weaker than α Canum Venaticorum, but it is still 100 times stronger than that of the Earth.

== Name and etymology ==
ε Ursae Majoris (Latinised to Epsilon Ursae Majoris) is the star's Bayer designation.

The traditional name Alioth comes from the Arabic عليات الحمال alyat al-hamal ("the sheep's fat tail"). In 2016, the International Astronomical Union organized a Working Group on Star Names (WGSN) to catalog and standardize proper names for stars. The WGSN's first bulletin of July 2016 included a table of the first two batches of names approved by the WGSN; which included Alioth for this star.

This star was known to the Hindus as Añgiras, one of the Seven Rishis.

In Chinese, 北斗 (Běi Dǒu), meaning Northern Dipper, refers to an asterism equivalent to the Big Dipper. Consequently, the Chinese name for Epsilon Ursae Majoris itself is 北斗五 (Běi Dǒu wu, English: the Fifth Star of Northern Dipper) and 玉衡 (Yù Héng, English: Star of Jade Sighting-Tube).

== Namesakes ==
The United States Navy's Crater class cargo ship USS Allioth (AK-109) was named after the star.

== See also ==
- List of brightest stars
- List of nearest bright stars
- Lists of stars
- Historical brightest stars
- List of nearest giant stars
