= Star tracker =

Type of optical device

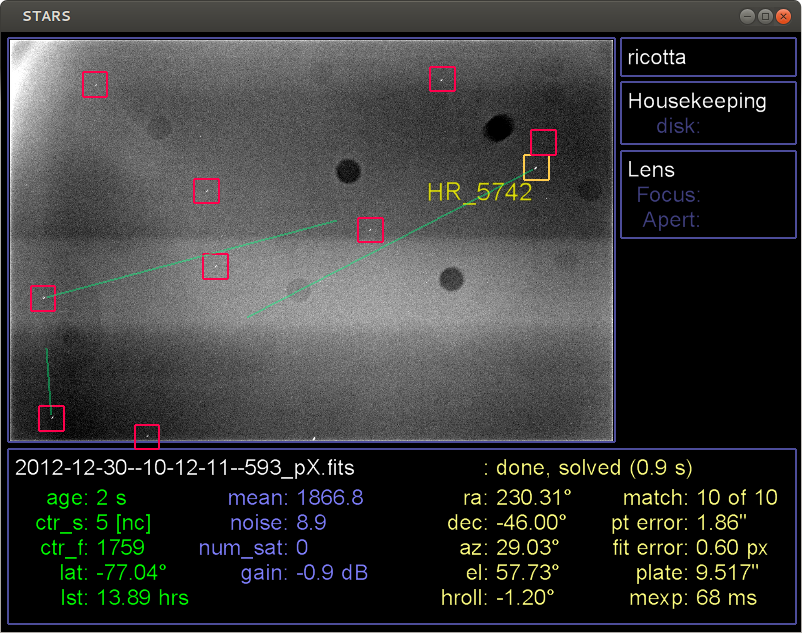
The STARS real-time star tracking software operates on an image from EBEX 2012, a high-altitude balloon-borne cosmology experiment launched from Antarctica on 2012-12-29

A star tracker is an optical device that measures the positions of stars using photocells or a camera. As the positions of many stars have been measured by astronomers to a high degree of accuracy, a star tracker on a satellite or spacecraft may be used to determine the orientation (or attitude) of the spacecraft with respect to the stars. In order to do this, the star tracker must obtain an image of the stars, measure their apparent position in the reference frame of the spacecraft, and identify the stars so their position can be compared with their known absolute position from a star catalog. A star tracker may include a processor to identify stars by comparing the pattern of observed stars with the known pattern of stars in the sky.

== History ==
In the 1950s and early 1960s, star trackers were an important part of early long-range ballistic missiles and cruise missiles, in the era when inertial navigation systems (INS) were not sufficiently accurate for intercontinental ranges.

Consider a Cold War missile flying towards its target; it initially starts by flying northward, passes over the arctic, and then begins flying southward again. From the missile's perspective, stars behind it appear to move closer to the southern horizon while those in front are rising. Before flight, one can calculate the relative angle of a star based on where the missile should be at that instant if it is in the correct location. That can then be compared to the measured location to produce an "error off" signal that can be used to bring the missile back onto its correct trajectory.

Due to the Earth's rotation, stars that are in a usable location change over the course of a day and the location of the target. Generally, a selection of several bright stars would be used and one would be selected at launch time. For guidance systems based solely on star tracking, some sort of recording mechanism, typically a magnetic tape, was pre-recorded with a signal that represented the angle of the star over the period of a day. At launch, the tape was forwarded to the appropriate time. During the flight, the signal on the tape was used to roughly position a telescope so it would point at the expected position of the star. At the telescope's focus was a photocell and some sort of signal-generator, typically a spinning disk known as a chopper. The chopper causes the image of the star to repeatedly appear and disappear on the photocell, producing a signal that was then smoothed to produce an alternating current output. The phase of that signal could be compared to the phase of the chopper to determine angle to the star and this angle could be compared to the expected one on the tape to produce a guidance signal. Choppers combined with lock-in amplifiers can also help to provide immunity to noise.

Star trackers were often combined with an INS. INS systems measure accelerations and integrate those over time to determine a velocity and, optionally, double-integrate to produce a location relative to its launch location. Even tiny measurement errors, when integrated, add up to an appreciable error known as "drift". For instance, the N-1 navigation system developed for the SM-64 Navaho cruise missile drifted at a rate of 1 nautical mile per hour, meaning that after a two-hour flight the INS would be indicating a position 2 nautical miles (3.7 km; 2.3 mi) away from its actual location. This was outside the desired accuracy of about half a mile.

In the case of an INS, the magnetic tape can be removed and those signals instead provided by the INS. The rest of the system works as before; the signal from the INS roughly positions the star tracker, which then measures the actual location of the star and produces an error signal. This signal is then used to correct the position being generated from the INS, reducing the accumulated drift back to the limit of the accuracy of the tracker. These "stellar inertial" systems were especially common from the 1950s through the 1980s, although some systems use it to this day.

== Current technology ==
Many models are currently available. There also exist open projects designed to be used for the global CubeSat researchers' and developers' community. Star trackers, which require high sensitivity, may become confused by sunlight reflected from the spacecraft, or by exhaust gas plumes from the spacecraft thrusters (either sunlight reflection or contamination of the star tracker window). Star trackers are also susceptible to a variety of errors (low spatial frequency, high spatial frequency, temporal, ...) in addition to a variety of optical sources of error (spherical aberration, chromatic aberration, etc.). There are also many potential sources of confusion for the star identification algorithm (planets, comets, supernovae, the bimodal character of the point spread function for adjacent stars, other nearby satellites, point-source light pollution from large cities on Earth, ...). There are roughly 57 bright navigational stars in common use. However, for more complex missions, entire star field databases are used to determine spacecraft orientation. A typical star catalogue for high-fidelity attitude determination is originated from a standard base catalog (for example from the United States Naval Observatory) and then filtered to remove problematic stars, for example due to apparent magnitude variability, color index uncertainty, or a location within the Hertzsprung-Russell diagram implying unreliability. These types of star catalogs can have thousands of stars stored in memory on board the spacecraft, or else processed using tools at the ground station and then uploaded. As space situational awareness sensors, star trackers can be used for space debris detection and for satellite identification.

== See also ==
- Celestial navigation
- GoTo (telescopes)
- Sun sensor
- Astrometry
