= Ex-meridian =

Navigational method

Ex-meridian is a celestial navigation method of calculating an observer's position on Earth. The method gives the observer a position line on which the observer is situated. It is usually used when the Sun is obscured at noon, and as a result, a meridian altitude is not possible. The navigator measures the altitude of the Sun as close to noon as possible and then calculates where the position line lies.

== Methodology ==
This method uses an assumed longitude and calculates the latitude that a position line crosses it. The position line obtained is actually part of a small circle, as opposed to great circle, where any observer can stand and the celestial object would have the same altitude in the sky. When plotting the small segment of this circle on a chart it is drawn as a straight line, the resulting tiny errors are too small to be significant.

The assumed longitude is usually obtained from the DR or Dead Reckoning position run up from a morning sight taken at around 9.00 am. This is worked out by applying the distance from that position either by log or by the estimated speed over time with the course steered. A sight is taken, that is the distance above the horizon of a heavenly object, in this case nearly always the sun, is measured with a sextant and the exact time noted in UTC. The sextant angle obtained is corrected for dip (the error caused by the observers height above the sea) and refraction to obtain the true altitude of the object above the horizon. This is then subtracted from 90° to obtain the angular distance from the position directly above, the zenith. This is referred to as the True Zenith Distance. The true zenith distance of the object is also the distance (in arc) on the Earth's surface from the observer to where that object is overhead, the geographical position of the object.

Using a nautical almanac, the declination (celestial latitude), and the Greenwich hour angle (celestial longitude) are obtained of the observed object for the time of observation. The assumed longitude is now added or subtracted to the Greenwich Hour Angle of the object to obtain the local hour angle, that is the difference in longitude between the DR position and the geographical position of the object.

With this information it is possible using the haversine formula to calculate the latitude where the position line crosses the assumed longitude. The formula is:

$hav(MZD) = hav(TZD) - hav(LHA) cos(Lat) cos(Dec)$

Where

$MZD$ = Meridian Zenith Distance

$TZD$ = True Zenith Distance

$LHA$ = Local Hour Angle

$Lat$ = DR Latitude

$Dec$ = Declination

Once the value of the Meridian Zenith Distance is obtained the algebraic sum of it with the declination of the object gives the latitude of a point where the position line crosses the meridian of DR longitude.

To draw the position line on a chart the azimuth or bearing of the heavenly object must be known. It is usually calculated but could have been observed. A line at right angles to the azimuth is drawn through the calculated position which is where the calculated latitude and the DR longitude cross. The observer is somewhere on this line.

To obtain a fix (a position) this line must be crossed with another position line either from another sight or from elsewhere. In the case of ex-meridian the position line is usually crossed with the position line obtained earlier which has been run up.

== Ex-Meridian Tables ==
The first of these tables applies corrections to the altitude taken with the argument of Change of Altitude in one minute from Meridian Passage. Two other tables apply more corrections until the correct latitude is arrived at.

== Accuracy and Versatility ==
The Ex-Meridian method of calculating sights is at its most accurate when the azimuth of the object is near to south or north. As the azimuth changes towards the east or west the cross of the position line with the assumed longitude becomes more and more oblique and the position obtained is therefore less accurate. For this reason it is a less versatile method of calculating sights than the intercept method which can be used for all azimuths. The tables are a quick and easy way to correct the altitude when the object is fairly low in the sky and the observer has only missed noon by a few minutes but if noon has been missed by more than that or the sun is high in the sky it is better to work out a sight by the intercept method.

== See also ==
- Celestial navigation
- Navigation
- Latitude
- Longitude
- Haversine formula
- Intercept method
- Longitude by chronometer
