= Kamal (navigation) =

Celestial navigation device that determines latitude

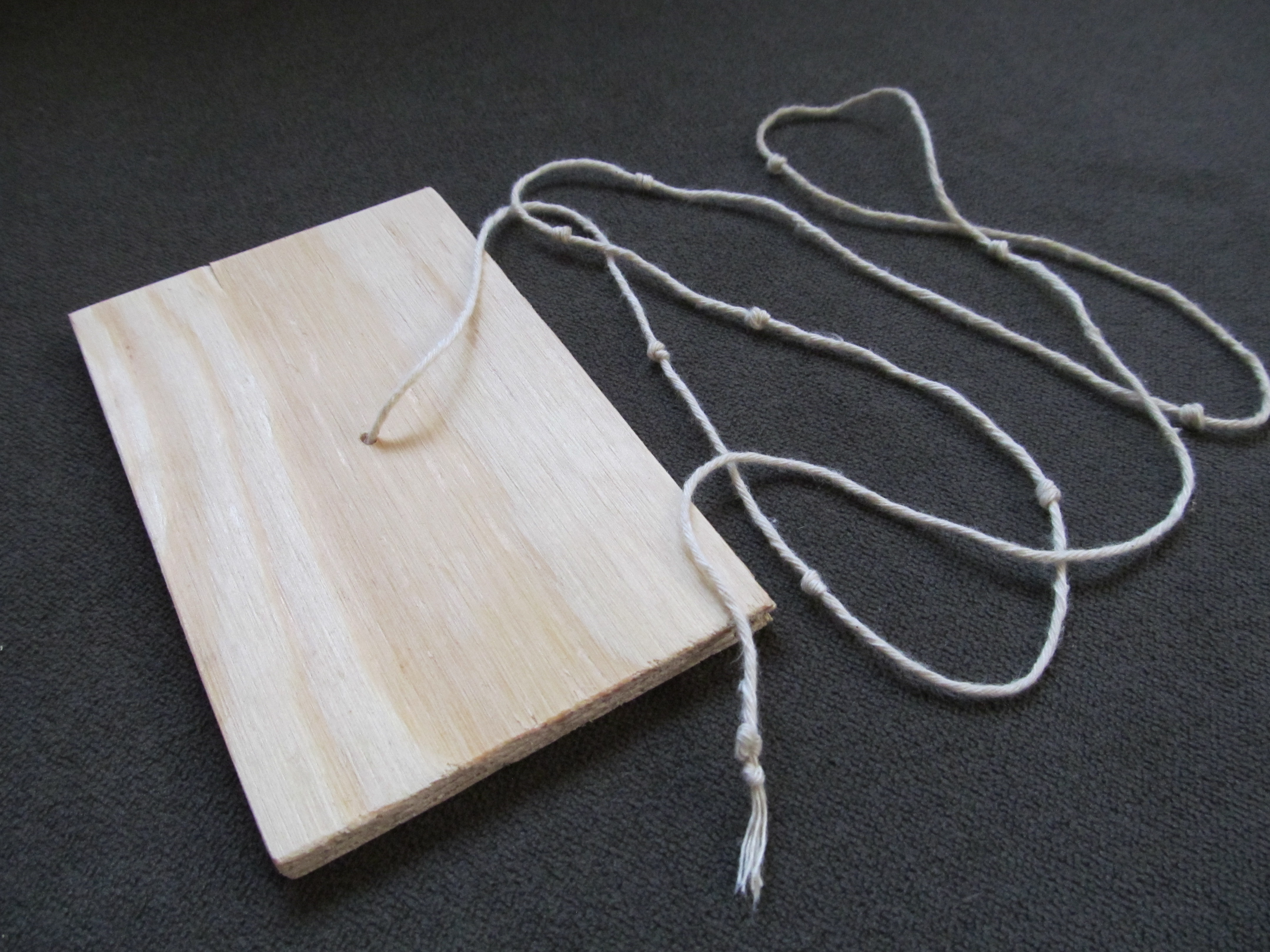
A simple wooden kamal.

A kamal, often called simply khashaba (wood in Arabic), is a celestial navigation device that determines latitude. The invention of the kamal allowed for the earliest known latitude sailing, and was thus the earliest step towards the use of quantitative methods in navigation. It originated with Arab navigators of the late 9th century, and was employed in the Indian Ocean from the 10th century. It was adopted by Indian navigators soon after, and then adopted by Chinese navigators some time before the 16th century.

== Description ==
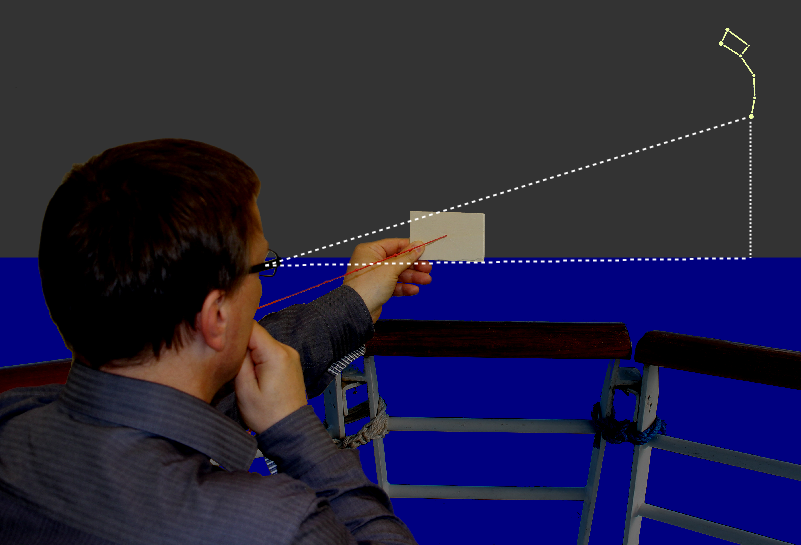
Usage of the kamal to determine the elevation of the polestar

Because Polaris is currently close to the celestial pole, its elevation is a good approximation of the latitude of the observer. The kamal consists of a rectangular wooden card about 2 by 1 inch (5.1 by 2.5 cm), to which a string with several equally spaced knots is attached through a hole in the middle of the card. The kamal is used by placing one end of the string in the teeth while the other end is held away from the body roughly parallel to the ground. The card is then moved along the string, positioned so the lower edge is even with the horizon, and the upper edge is occluding a target star, typically Polaris because its angle to the horizon does not change with longitude or time. The angle can then be measured by counting the number of knots from the teeth to the card, or a particular knot can be tied into the string if travelling to a known latitude.

== Make your own kamal ==
It is not necessary to follow a certain standard or calculation to make your own kamal; all you need is piece of wood, string and help of a sextant or any angle measuring device for the first calibration of your personal kamal. Choose any object, preferably Polaris. Take the angle reading with the sextant, for example 24. Then take a reading with the kamal, for example 15cm as the length of the string to the board, therefore 15cm is equal to 24 degrees. You can keep making different readings the same way for different objects until you have your own standard of measurements. Helpful tip - make a calibration card and print it on the kamal board itself, for example 30cm=45 degrees, and 20cm=30 degrees.

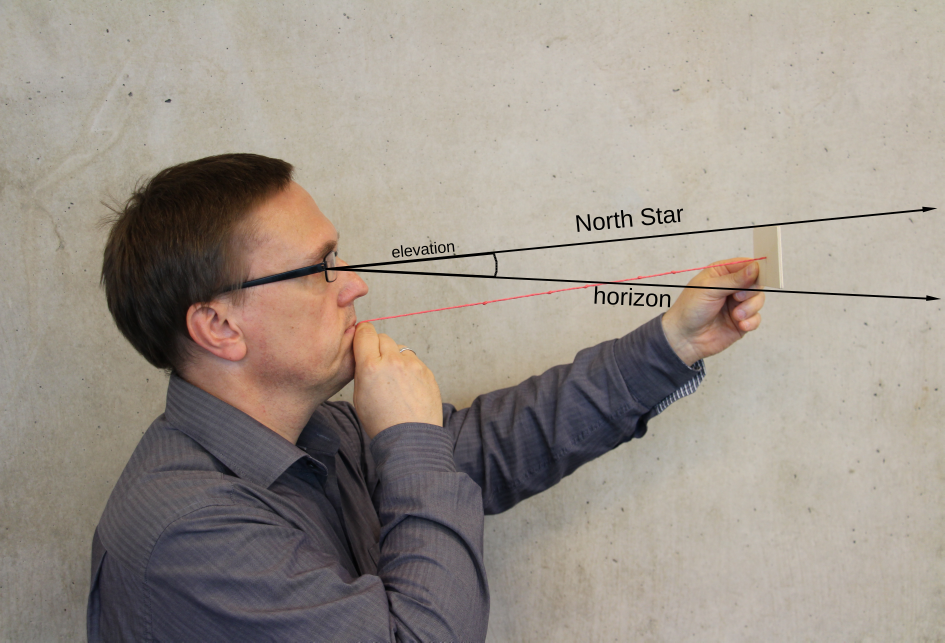
Side view of how the kamal was used to measure the elevations of stars. While the lower edge aligns with the horizon, the upper edge indicates the elevation of the star.

The knots were typically tied to measure angles of one finger-width. When held at arm's length, the width of a finger measures an angle that remains fairly similar from person to person. This was widely used (and still is today) for rough angle measurements, an angle known as issabah إصبع in Arabic or a zhi 指 in Chinese (both meaning 'finger'). By modern measure, this is about 1 degree, 36 minutes, and 25 seconds, or just over 1.5 degrees. It is equal to the arcsine of the ratio of the width of the finger to the length of the arm. In Chinese navigation, the unit of jiao 角 is also used to represent a quarter 指 (an angle of 24 minutes 6 seconds).

Due to the limited width of the card, the kamal was only really useful for measuring Polaris in equatorial latitudes, where Polaris remains close to the horizon. This fact may explain why it was not common in Europe. For these higher-latitude needs somewhat more complex devices based on the same principle were used, notably the cross-staff and backstaff.

The kamal is still a tool recommended for use in sea kayaking. In such an application, it can be used for estimating distances to land. The distance can be calculated from the formula

$$D=\frac{Sd}{s}$$

where $D$ is the distance to the object, $S$ is the size of the object observed, $d$ is the distance from the kamal to the observer's eye, and $s$ is the size of the kamal.

== See also ==
- Sextant
