= USS Allioth =

Cargo ship of the United States Navy

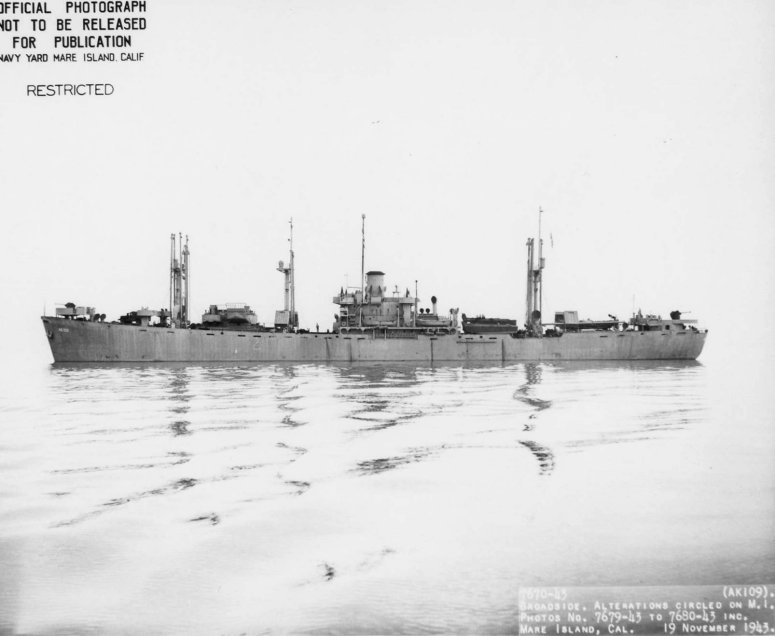
- Broadside view of USS Allioth (AK-109), off San Francisco, 19 November 1943

History

United States
- Name: James Rowan
- Owner: War Shipping Administration (WSA)
- Operator: Pope & Talbot, Inc.
- Ordered: as a Type EC2-S-C1 hull, MCE hull 1730
- Builder: Permanente Metals Corporation, Yard #2, Richmond, California
- Cost: $738,276
- Yard number: 1730
- Way number: 10
- Laid down: 30 July 1943
- Launched: 20 August 1943
- Sponsored by: Miss Cora Clonts
- In service: 31 August 1943
- Identification: Call sign: KYDY
- Fate: transferred to the US Navy, 3 October 1943

United States
- Name: Allioth
- Namesake: The star Allioth
- Acquired: 5 October 1943
- Commissioned: 25 October 1943
- Decommissioned: 18 May 1946
- Reclassified: Miscellaneous Unclassified (IX), March 1945; Aviation Supply Issue Ship (AVS), 3 May 1945
- Refit: Grumium-class Aviation Supply Issue Ship, at Alameda, California, March 1945
- Stricken: 22 May 1947
- Identification: Hull symbol: AK-109; Hull symbol: IX-204; Hull symbol: AVS-4; Code letters: NTNM
- Fate: Sold for scrapping, 27 August 1964

General characteristics
- Class & type: Crater-class cargo ship (1943–1945); Grumium-class aviation supply issue ship (1945–1946)
- Tonnage: 10,856 DWT; 7,176 GT
- Displacement: 4,023 long tons (4,088 t) (standard); 14,550 long tons (14,780 t) (full load)
- Length: 441 ft 6 in (134.57 m)
- Beam: 56 ft 11 in (17.35 m)
- Draft: 28 ft 4 in (8.64 m)
- Installed power: 2 × Babcock & Wilcox header-type boilers, 220psi 450°; 2,500 shp (1,900 kW)
- Propulsion: 1 × Joshua Hendy vertical triple-expansion reciprocating steam engine; 1 × shaft
- Speed: 12.5 kn (23.2 km/h; 14.4 mph)
- Capacity: 7,800 t (7,700 long tons) DWT; 444,206 cu ft (12,578.5 m^{3}) (non-refrigerated)
- Complement: 206
- Armament: 1 × 5 in (127 mm)/38-caliber dual-purpose gun; 1 × 3 in (76 mm)/50-caliber dual-purpose gun; 8 × 20 mm (0.8 in) Oerlikon cannons anti-aircraft (AA) mounts

USS Allioth (AK-109/IX-204/AVS-4) was a Crater-class cargo ship and aviation supply ship in the service of the US Navy in World War II. Named after Alioth, a star in constellation Ursa Major. She was responsible for delivering troops, goods and equipment to locations in the war zone.

== Construction ==
Allioth was laid down under a Maritime Commission (MARCOM) contract, MCE hull 1730, on 30 July 1943, as the Liberty ship, James Rowan, was laid down by the Permanente Metals Corporation, Yard #2, Richmond, California. She was launched on 20 August 1943, and sponsored by Miss Cora Clonts.

James Rowan was delivered to Pope & Talbot, Inc., on 31 August 1943, for civilian use.

== Service history ==
James Rowan was acquired by the US Navy, on 3 October 1943; renamed Allioth and designated AK-109, on 6 October 1943; and commissioned at Portland, Oregon, on 25 October 1943.

Upon her arrival at Pearl Harbor, on 5 December 1943, the cargo ship was assigned to Service Squadron 8 (ServRon 8). During the next 11 months, she operated as a mobile supply source for the US Army. Her duties consisted of loading cargo and dispensing it to troops as needed. Among the ports from which she operated were Funafuti, Ellice Islands; Makin and Tarawa, Gilbert Islands; Kwajalein and Eniwetok, Marshall Islands; and Peleliu and Angaur, Palau Islands.

=== Under attack by Japanese aircraft ===
Allioth sailed from Peleliu, on 14 November 1944, bound for Pearl Harbor. On the afternoon of 20 November, two Japanese airplanes attacked her, dropping several bombs but scoring no hits.

Later that evening, one aircraft returned and dropped a bomb which exploded near the ship. Ten crewmen were slightly wounded, and the ship suffered minor structural damage from shrapnel. She continued her journey and arrived safely in Hawaiian waters on 11 December 1944.

=== Conversion to "aviation supply issue ship" ===
Two days later, the ship resumed her voyage toward the West Coast of the United States, and she entered a shipyard at Alameda, California, on 24 December, for overhaul and conversion to an Aviation Supply Issue Ship. The alterations were completed in early March 1945, and Allioth received the new designation IX-204.

=== Servicing aircraft at Ulithi ===
On 10 March, the vessel got underway for Pearl Harbor. After taking on more cargo there, she resumed her westward voyage, dropped anchor at Ulithi, on 8 April, and began supplying various units with airplane parts. On 3 May, her designation was changed to AVS-4.

=== Supporting aircraft in the Philippines ===
When the fleet moved from Ulithi, Allioth headed for the Philippine Islands, arriving at Leyte Gulf, on 27 May. In early June, the ship sailed to Seeadler Harbor, Manus Island, to load more spare parts. She returned to Leyte, on 29 June, and resumed her supply duties.

=== Supporting aircraft in the Ryukyu Islands ===
Allioth moved to Okinawa, in mid-September 1945, and remained there into the next year, supporting various airplane squadrons operating in the Ryukyu Islands. On 18 January 1946, the ship got underway to return to the United States. Allioth arrived back at Alameda, on 16 February, and began discharging cargo. Her crew also began stripping the ship of excess equipment in preparation for her deactivation.

== Fate ==
Allioth returned to Pearl Harbor, on 15 April, and was placed out of commission there on 18 May 1946. She was transferred to MARCOM on 13 May 1947, and laid up in the Suisun Bay Reserve Fleet, at Suisun Bay, California.

Her name was struck from the Navy List on 22 May 1947. Under MARCOM, the ship resumed her first name, James Rowan. On 27 August 1964, she was sold to Union Minerals and Alloys Corporation, for $50,719.13. On 13 October 1964, she was withdrawn from the fleet.

== Awards ==
Allioth's crew was eligible for the following medals:

- Combat Action Ribbon (retroactive, 14 November 1944)
- American Campaign Medal
- Asiatic-Pacific Campaign Medal
- World War II Victory Medal
- Navy Occupation Service Medal (with Asia clasp)
- Philippines Liberation Medal

== Bibliography ==
- "Allioth". Dictionary of American Naval Fighting Ships. Naval History and Heritage Command. 16 June 2015. This article incorporates text from this source, which is in the public domain.
- "Kaiser Permanente No. 2, Richmond CA". ShipbuildingHistory.com. 13 October 2010.
- Priolo, Gary P. (21 June 2019). "USS Allioth (AVS-4)". NavSource.
- "JAMES ROWAN". United States Department of Transportation. Archived from the original on 3 November 2016.
- "SS James Rowan".
