= Hack watch =

Type of mechanical watch

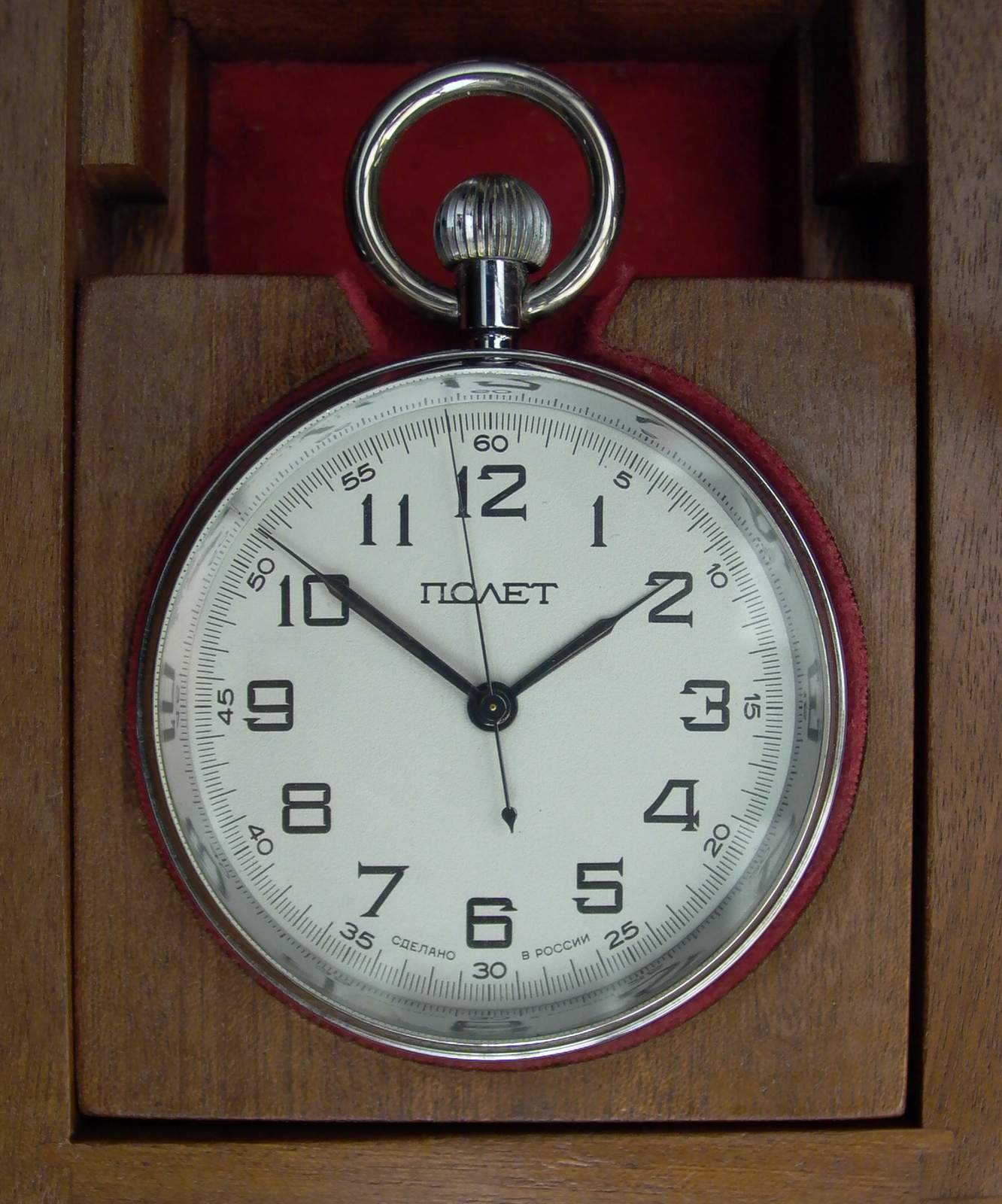
Hack watch, made in the Soviet Union by Poljot

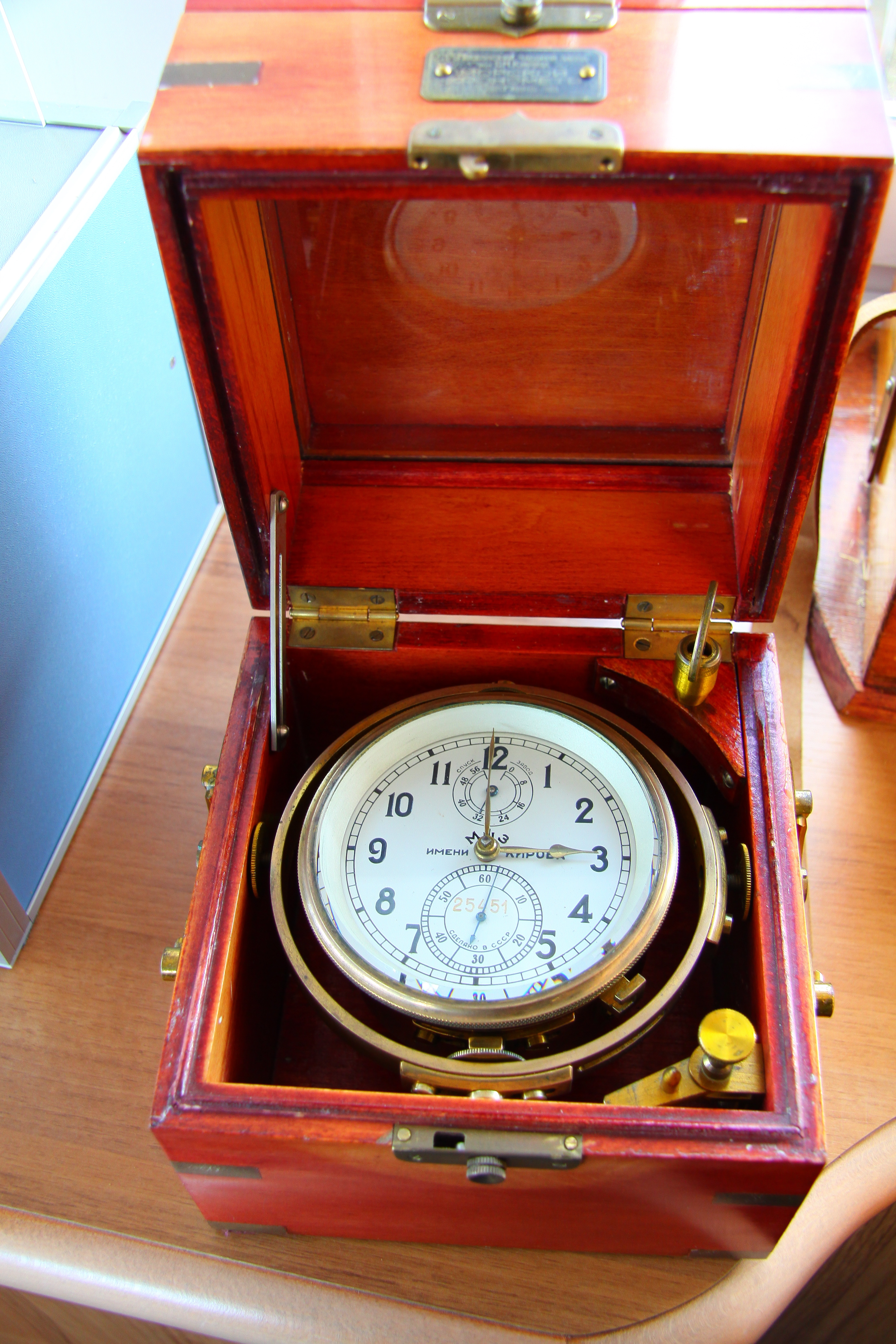
Kirov (Poljot) MX6 marine chronometer

Hack watch and a marine chronometer

A hack watch is a mechanical watch whose movement offers a mechanism for stopping and setting the seconds hand of the watch, then restarting the watch the instant the time setting matches the time displayed by a reference timepiece.

Hack watches are used on ships for astronomical sights for navigation and to synchronize the actions of personnel who may not be in direct communication (for example, personnel engaged in a military mission).

For navigational purposes, the hack watch is synchronized with the ship's marine chronometer. The use of a hack watch makes it easier to take sights, as the chronometer is normally in a fixed position in a ship – below decks and suspended in gimbals to keep it level and protect it from the elements, while the hack watch is portable and can be carried on deck. Though not as accurate as the chronometer, the hack watch is accurate enough to be satisfactory over the relatively short time period between setting it from the chronometer and taking the sight.

For mission synchronization, several hack watches can be set alike, then set going at the same moment.

== Time hack ==
A 'time hack' is when one or more timepieces are set to a certain time and at the same time, so all are synchronized. In World War 2, Allied airmen would perform a time hack in the briefing room before heading out to their airplanes.

This can be done today by listening to various time stations like WWV.
