= List of stars for navigation =

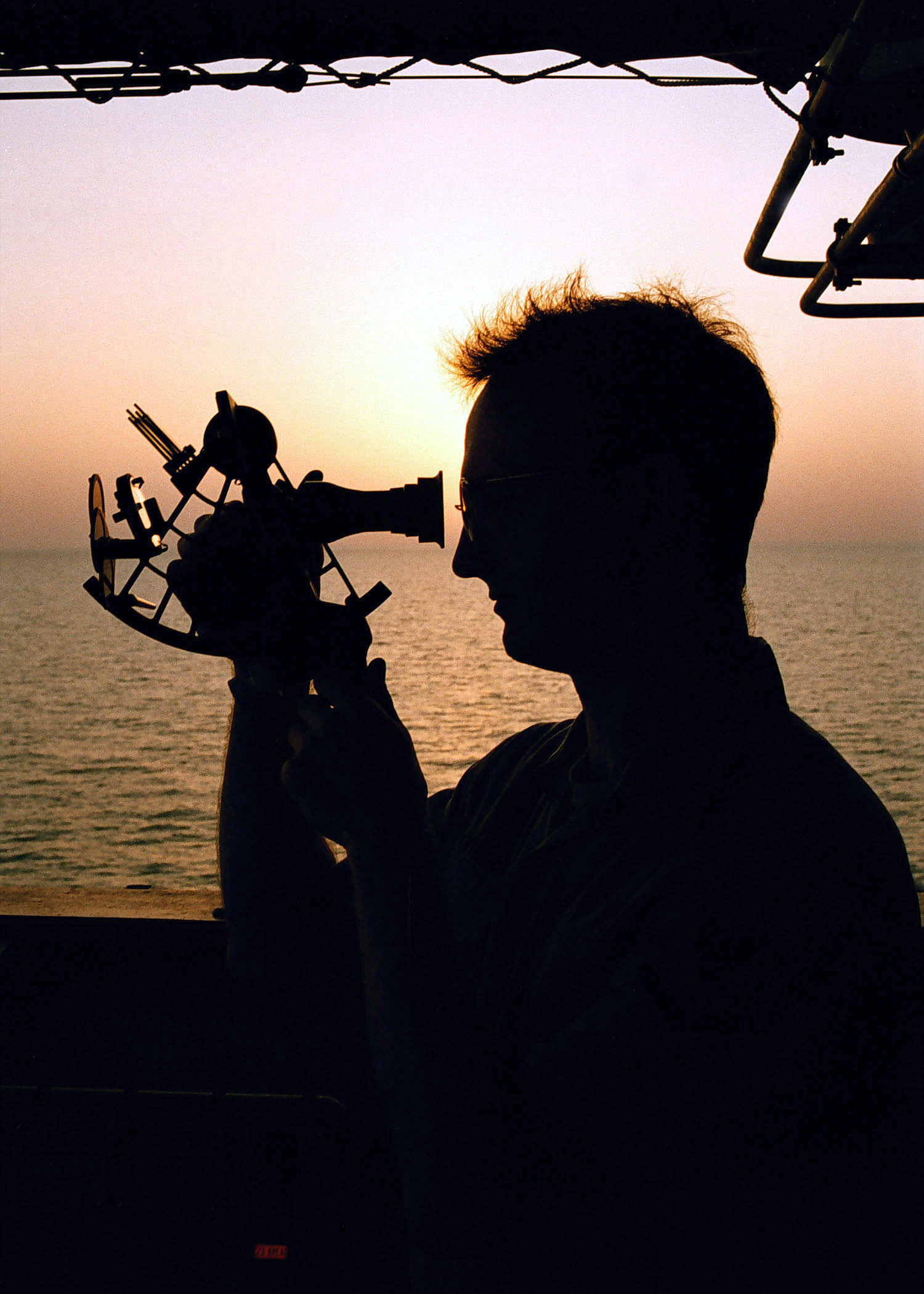
The selected stars for navigation are often used for sextant observations.

Fifty-seven navigational stars and additionally the star Polaris are given a special status in the field of celestial navigation. Of the approximately six thousand stars visible to the naked eye under optimal conditions, these selected stars are among the brightest and span thirty-eight constellations of the celestial sphere from the declination of −70° to +89°. Many of the selected stars were named in antiquity by the Babylonians, Greeks, Romans, Arabs and Polynesians.

The star Polaris, often called either the "Pole Star" or the "North Star", is treated specially due to its proximity to the north celestial pole. When navigating in the Northern Hemisphere, a simple and quick technique can be used with Polaris to determine the observers latitude or, for larger maritime vessels can be used to calculate any gyrocompass error that may exist. The other fifty-seven selected stars have daily positions given in nautical almanacs, aiding the navigator in efficiently performing observations on them. A second group of 115 "tabulated stars" can also be used for celestial navigation, but are often less familiar to the navigator and require extra calculations.

Although Polaris can quickly and simply give a solution for latitude in the northern hemisphere, it can not participate in giving a position fix including longitude - it is for this reason it is excluded from the list of 57 primary navigational stars, each of which can be used to produce (in conjunction with each other, known time in relation to the prime meridian and a set of sight reduction tables) an actual latitudinal and longitudinal positional fix.

For purposes of identification, the positions of navigational stars — expressed as declination and sidereal hour angle — are often rounded to the nearest degree. In addition to tables, star charts provide an aid to the navigator in identifying the navigational stars, showing constellations, relative positions, and brightness.

In practical use for sight reductions whilst at sea, tables can further assist a navigator by giving approximate altitudes (angles above the horizon) and azimuths (degrees as read from the compass) from an assumed or estimated position, usually helping to quickly determine the location and then quickly identify a particular navigational star that may be useful for a sight reduction.

== Background ==
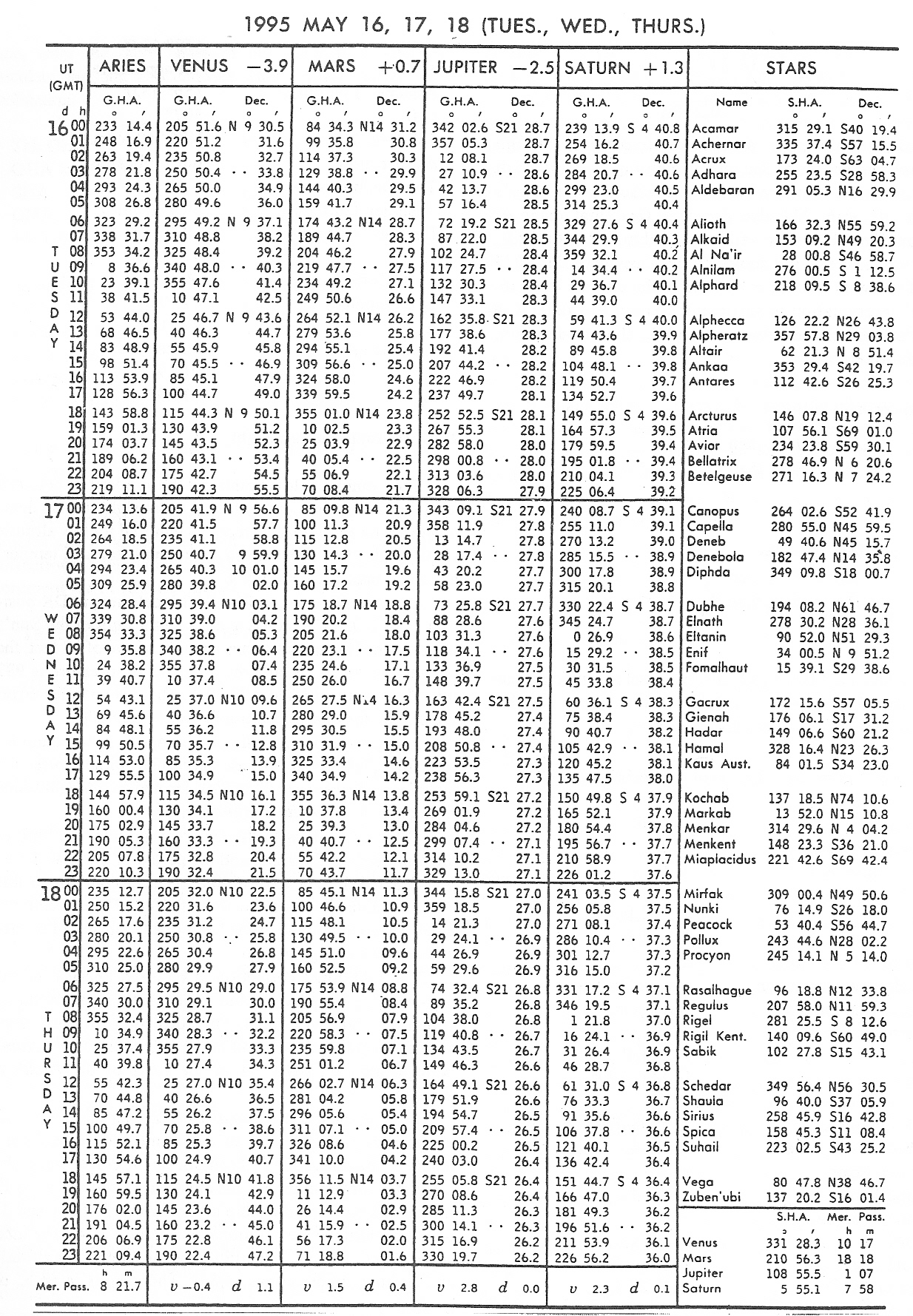
Selected navigation stars (except Polaris) listed on a U.S. Nautical Almanac page for May 1995

Under optimal conditions, approximately six thousand stars are visible to the naked eye of an observer on Earth. Of these, fifty-eight stars are known in the field of navigational astronomy as "selected stars", including nineteen stars of the first magnitude, thirty-eight stars of the second magnitude, and Polaris. The selection of the stars is made by His Majesty's Nautical Almanac Office and the US Naval Observatory, in the production of the yearly Nautical Almanac which the two organizations have published jointly since 1958. Criteria in the choice of stars includes their distribution across the celestial sphere, brightness, and ease of identification. Information for another 115 stars, known as "tabulated stars", is also available to the navigator. This list provides information on the name, approximate position in the celestial sphere, and apparent magnitude of the 58 selected stars in tabular form and by star charts.

These stars are typically used in two ways by the navigator. The first is to obtain a line of position by use of a sextant observation and the techniques of celestial navigation. Multiple lines of position can be intersected to obtain a position known as a celestial fix. The second typical use of the navigational stars is to determine gyrocompass error by computing the azimuth of a star and comparing it to an azimuth measured using the ship's gyrocompass. Numerous other applications also exist.

Navigators typically refer to stars using one of two naming systems for stars: common names and Bayer's designations. All of the selected stars have had a common name since 1953, and many were named in antiquity by the Arabs, Greeks, Romans, and Babylonians. Bayer's naming convention has been in use since 1603, and consists of a Greek letter combined with the possessive form of the star's constellation. Both names are shown for each star in the tables and charts below.

Each star's approximate position on the celestial sphere is given using the equatorial coordinate system. The celestial sphere is an imaginary globe of infinite size with the Earth at its center. Positions on the celestial sphere are often expressed using two coordinates: declination and sidereal hour angle, which are similar to latitude and longitude on the surface of the Earth. To define declination, the Earth's equator is projected out to the celestial sphere to construct the celestial equator, and declination is measured in degrees north or south of this celestial equator. Sidereal hour angle is a measurement between 0° and 360°, indicating how far west a body is from an arbitrarily chosen point on the celestial sphere called the First Point of Aries. Note that right ascension, as used by astronomers, is 360° minus the sidereal hour angle.

The final characteristic provided in the tables and star charts is the star's brightness, expressed in terms of apparent magnitude. Magnitude is a logarithmic scale of brightness, designed so that a body of one magnitude is approximately 2.512 times brighter than a body of the next magnitude. (Note: The value is actually the fifth root of 100, an irrational number known as Pogson's Ratio. See Teaching Science. Vol. 52–53. Australian Science Teachers' Association. 2006. p. 44.) Thus, a body of magnitude 1 is 2.512^{5} (~100) times brighter than a body of magnitude 6. The dimmest stars that can be seen through a 200-inch terrestrial telescope are of the 20th magnitude, and very bright objects like the Sun and a full Moon have magnitudes of −26.7 and −12.6 respectively.

== Table ==
Key to the table
Column title	Description
No.	The number used to identify stars in navigation publications and star charts. (Note: This list uses the assigned numbers from the Nautical Almanac, which includes only 57 stars. Polaris, which is included in the list given in The American Practical Navigator, is listed here without a number.)
Common name	The name of the star commonly used navigation publications and star charts.
Bayer designation	Another name of the star which combines a Greek letter with the possessive form of its constellation's Latin name.
Etymology of common name	Etymology of the common name.
SHA	Sidereal hour angle (SHA), the angular distance west of the vernal equinox.
Dec.	Declination, the angular distance north or south of the celestial equator.
App. magnitude	Apparent magnitude, an indicator of the star's brightness.

The table of navigational stars provides several types of information. In the first column is the identifying index number, followed by the common name, the Bayer designation, and the etymology of the common name. Then the star's approximate position, suitable for identification purposes, is given in terms of declination and sidereal hour angle, followed by the star's magnitude. The final column presents citations to the sources of the data, The American Practical Navigator and the star's entry at the SIMBAD database, a project of the Strasbourg Astronomical Data Center or CDS.

No.	Common name	Bayer designation	Etymology of common name	SHA	Declination	App. magnitude	References
1	Alpheratz	α Andromedae	the horse's navel	358	N 29°	2.06	
2	Ankaa	α Phoenicis	coined name, "phoenix bird" in Arabic	354	S 42°	2.37	
3	Schedar	α Cassiopeiae	the breast (of Cassiopeia)	350	N 56°	2.25	
4	Diphda	β Ceti	the second frog (Fomalhaut was once the first)	349	S 18°	2.04	
5	Achernar	α Eridani	end of the river (Eridanus)	336	S 57°	0.50	
6	Hamal	α Arietis	full-grown lamb	328	N 23°	2.00	
7	Acamar	θ Eridani	another form of Achernar	316	S 40°	3.2	
8	Menkar	α Ceti	nose (of the whale)	315	N 04°	2.5	
9	Mirfak	α Persei	elbow of the Pleiades	309	N 50°	1.82	
10	Aldebaran	α Tauri	follower (of the Pleiades)	291	N 16°	0.85 var (Note: The suffix var after the numeric value denotes a variable star whose magnitude changes over time.)	
11	Rigel	β Orionis	foot (left foot of Orion)	282	S 08°	0.12	
12	Capella	α Aurigae	little she-goat	281	N 46°	0.71	
13	Bellatrix	γ Orionis	female warrior	279	N 06°	1.64	
14	Elnath	β Tauri	one butting with the horns	279	N 29°	1.68	
15	Alnilam	ε Orionis	string of pearls	276	S 01°	1.70	
16	Betelgeuse	α Orionis	the hand of al-Jauzā (i.e. Orion)	271	N 07°	0.58 var	
17	Canopus	α Carinae	city of ancient Egypt	264	S 53°	−0.72	
18	Sirius	α Canis Majoris	the scorching one (popularly, the dog star)	259	S 17°	−1.47	
19	Adhara	ε Canis Majoris	the virgin(s)	256	S 29°	1.51	
20	Procyon	α Canis Minoris	before the dog (rising before the dog star, Sirius)	245	N 05°	0.34	
21	Pollux	β Geminorum	Zeus' other twin son (Castor, α Gem, is the first twin)	244	N 28°	1.15	
22	Avior	ε_{1} Carinae	coined name	234	S 59°	2.4	
23	Suhail	λ Velorum	shortened form of Al Suhail, one Arabic name for Canopus	223	S 43°	2.23	
24	Miaplacidus	β Carinae	quiet or still waters	222	S 70°	1.70	
25	Alphard	α Hydrae	solitary star of the serpent	218	S 09°	2.00	
26	Regulus	α Leonis	the prince	208	N 12°	1.35	
27	Dubhe	α_{1} Ursae Majoris	the bear's back	194	N 62°	1.87	
28	Denebola	β Leonis	tail of the lion	183	N 15°	2.14	
29	Gienah	γ Corvi	right wing of the raven	176	S 17°	2.80	
30	Acrux	α_{1} Crucis	coined from Bayer name	174	S 63°	1.40	
31	Gacrux	γ Crucis	coined from Bayer name	172	S 57°	1.63	
32	Alioth	ε Ursae Majoris	another form of Capella	167	N 56°	1.76	
33	Spica	α Virginis	the ear of corn	159	S 11°	1.04	
34	Alkaid	η Ursae Majoris	leader of the daughters of the bier	153	N 49°	1.85	
35	Hadar	β Centauri	leg of the centaur	149	S 60°	0.60	
36	Menkent	θ Centauri	shoulder of the centaur	149	S 36°	2.06	
37	Arcturus	α Boötis	the bear's guard	146	N 19°	−0.04 var	
38	Rigil Kentaurus	α_{1} Centauri	foot of the centaur	140	S 61°	−0.01	
39	Zubenelgenubi	α Librae	southern claw (of the scorpion)	138	S 16°	3.28	
40	Kochab	β Ursae Minoris	shortened form of "north star" (named when it was that, (Note: For more information, see the article changing pole stars.) ca. 1500 BC – AD 300).	137	N 74°	2.08	
41	Alphecca	α Coronae Borealis	feeble one (in the crown)	127	N 27°	2.24	
42	Antares	α Scorpii	rival of Mars (in color)	113	S 26°	1.09	
43	Atria	α Trianguli Australis	coined from Bayer name	108	S 69°	1.92	
44	Sabik	η Ophiuchi	second winner or conqueror	103	S 16°	2.43	
45	Shaula	λ Scorpii	cocked-up part of the scorpion's tail	097	S 37°	1.62	
46	Rasalhague	α Ophiuchi	head of the serpent charmer	096	N 13°	2.10	
47	Eltanin	γ Draconis	head of the dragon	091	N 51°	2.23	
48	Kaus Australis	ε Sagittarii	southern part of the bow (of Sagittarius)	084	S 34°	1.80	
49	Vega	α Lyrae	the falling eagle or vulture	081	N 39°	0.03	
50	Nunki	σ Sagittarii	constellation of the holy city (Eridu)	076	S 26°	2.06	
51	Altair	α Aquilae	flying eagle or vulture	063	N 09°	0.77	
52	Peacock	α Pavonis	Coined from the English name of the constellation	054	S 57°	1.91	
53	Deneb	α Cygni	tail of the hen	050	N 45°	1.25	
54	Enif	ε Pegasi	nose of the horse	034	N 10°	2.40	
55	Al Na'ir	α Gruis	bright one (of the southern fish's tail)	028	S 47°	1.74	
56	Fomalhaut	α Piscis Austrini	mouth of the southern fish	016	S 30°	1.16	
57	Markab	α Pegasi	saddle (of Pegasus)	014	N 15°	2.49	
*	Polaris	α Ursae Minoris	the pole (star)	319	N 89°	2.01 var	

== Star charts ==
Key to the Star charts
Item	Description
UPPERCASE TEXT	Constellation names are indicated in uppercase text.
star of magnitude 1.5 and brighter	Selected star of magnitude 1.5 and brighter. Labeled with common name, star number, and Greek letter to indicate Bayer designation.
star of magnitude 1.6 and fainter	Selected star of magnitude 1.6 and fainter. Labeled with common name, star number, and Greek letter to indicate Bayer designation.
star of magnitude 2.5 and brighter	Tabulated star of magnitude 2.5 and brighter. Labeled with Greek letter to indicate Bayer designation.
star of magnitude 2.6 and fainter	Tabulated star of magnitude 2.6 and fainter. Labeled with Greek letter to indicate Bayer designation.
untabulated star	Untabulated star. Not labeled.
Dotted line	Constellation outline.

Navigators often use star charts to identify a star by its position relative to other stars. References like the Nautical Almanac and The American Practical Navigator provide four star charts, covering different portions of the celestial sphere. Two of these charts are azimuthal equidistant projections of the north and south poles. The other two cover the equatorial region of the celestial sphere, from the declination of 30° south to 30° north. The two equatorial charts are mercator projections, one for the eastern hemisphere of the celestial sphere and one for the western hemisphere. Note that unlike familiar maps, east is shown to the left and west is shown to the right. With this orientation, the navigator can hold the star chart overhead, and the arrangement of the stars on the chart will resemble the stars in the sky.

In the star charts, constellations are labelled with capital letters and indicated by dotted lines collecting their stars. The 58 selected stars for navigation are shown in blue and labelled with their common name, star number, and a Greek letter to indicate their Bayer designation. The additional 115 tabulated stars that can also be used for navigation are shown in red and labelled with a Greek letter to indicate their Bayer designation. Some additional stars not suitable for navigation are also included on the charts to indicate constellations, they are presented as unlabelled small red dots.

=== Equatorial stars ===
Equatorial stars of the eastern hemisphere

The equatorial region of the celestial sphere's eastern hemisphere includes 17 navigational stars from Alpheratz in the constellation Andromeda to Denebola in Leo. It also includes stars from the constellations Cetus, Aries, Taurus, Orion, Canis Major and Minor, Gemini, and Hydra. Of particular note among these stars are "the dog star" Sirius, the brightest star in the sky, and four stars of the easily identified constellation Orion.

Equatorial stars of the western hemisphere

The equatorial region of the celestial sphere's western hemisphere includes 12 navigational stars from Gienah in the constellation Corvus to Markab in Pegasus. It also includes stars from the constellations Virgo, Bootes, Libra, Corona Borealis, Scorpius, Ophiuchus, Sagittarius, and Aquila. The variable star Arcturus is the brightest star in this group.

=== Northern stars ===

The 11 northern stars are those with a declination between 30° north and 90° north. They are listed in order of decreasing sidereal hour angle, or from the vernal equinox westward across the sky. Starting with Schedar in the constellation Cassiopeia, the list includes stars from the constellations Auriga, the Great and Little Bears, Draco, Lyra, and Cygnus. The two brightest northern stars are Vega and Capella.

In the star chart to the right, declination is shown by the radial coordinate, starting at 90° north in the center and decreasing to 30° north at the outer edge. Sidereal hour angle is shown as the angular coordinate, starting at 0° at the left of the chart, and increasing counter-clockwise.

=== Southern stars ===

The 18 southern stars are those with a declination between 30° south and 90° south. They are listed in order of decreasing sidereal hour angle, or from the vernal equinox westward across the sky. Starting with Ankaa in the constellation Phoenix, the list includes stars from the constellations Eridanus, Carina, Crux, Centaurus, Triangulum Australe, Scorpius, Sagittarius, Pavo, and Grus. Canopus, Rigil Kentaurus, Achernar, and Hadar are the brightest stars in the southern sky.

In the star chart to the right, declination is shown by the radial coordinate, starting at 90° south in the center and decreasing to 30° south at the outer edge. Sidereal hour angle is shown as the angular coordinate, starting at 0° at the right of the chart, and increasing clockwise.

=== Planisphere ===
The Star Finder 2102-D (Weems & Plath, Inc., NSN: 6605-00-129-6526) is a tool for celestial navigators in a form of standard pocket planisphere (its double-sided 8½"-disk star chart includes all the 57 navigation stars) with a set of 9 identifier transparent overlays per each 5°-latitude and one meridians overlay, based on the original Rude Star Finder and Identifier (patented by Gilbert T. Rude in 1920) modified by E. B. Collins and United States Hydrographic Office (Star-Finder 2021-B and 2102-C released in 1940s), and further modified and published by the Simex Instruents, with recent modifications by the Weems & Plath. Its use described in The Star Finder Book: A Complete Guide to the Many Uses of the 2102-D Star Finder by David Burch. Unlike other pocket planispheres, commonly used in amateur astronomy, (Note: Here is a list of the most popular planispheres used by stargazers in amateur astronomy, including DIY templates for makers: Philip's Planisphere (George Philip & Son Ltd.), Pocket Planisphere (Francis Chichester), Study the Stars: Pocket Astronomy and Pocket Planisphere (Eduactional Novelty Co.), Star Wheel (Sky & Telescope), BBC Sky at Night Magazine Planisphere, The Miller Planisphere, Collins Planisphere (Royal Observatory Greenwich), Celestron Sky Maps with Glow-in-the-Dark Star Finder, Rob Walrecht Planisphere (Rob Walrecht Production, et al.), The Night Sky (David S. Chandler), Orion Star Target or Tirion Double-Sided Multi-Latitude Planisphere (Wil Tirion), Guide to the Stars (Ken Graun), Pocket Star Finder (Toysmith), Star Wheel (Wild Life Outdoor Adventures), The Messier Observer's Planisphere (Celestial Teapot Designs), Southern Star Wheel (DOCdb/CfAH), Oculum Drehbare Himmelskarte (Michael Feiler, Stephan Schuring), Ukrainian: Рухома карта зоряного неба, lit. 'Movable map of the star sky' (НЦ «Українська Дидактика»), Planisphere Geocoin (CompassRoseGeocoin), Die Drehbare Taschen-Sternkarte (AstroMedia), Drehbare Kosmos Mini-Sternkarte (Hermann-Michael Hahn, Gerhard Weiland), DIY Drehbare Sternkarte/Planisphere • Star Wheel (Joahim Broser), DIY In-The-Sky.org Planisphere (Dominic Ford), DIY Drifted.in Planisphere (Jan Tošovsky), etc.) the Star Finder 2102-D disk star chart has only dots representing stars positions and size, labeled only with its common names, and no other info (such as constellation lines and names, grids, etc.), making it unusable without overlays set and data table.

== Footnotes ==
Notes

Citations
