= Sumner =

Sumner may refer to:

== Places ==
=== Antarctica ===
- Mount Sumner, a mountain in the Rare Range, Antarctica
- Sumner Glacier, southern Graham Land, Antarctica

=== Australia ===
- Sumner, Queensland, a suburb of Brisbane

=== New Zealand ===
- Sumner, New Zealand, a seaside suburb of Christchurch, New Zealand
- Archdeacon of Sumner, Anglican Diocese of Christchurch, Aotearoa, New Zealand and Polynesia
- Lake Sumner

=== United States ===
- Sumner, California, a former town, now East Bakersfield, California
- Sumner, Florida, an unincorporated community
- Sumner, Georgia, a town
- Sumner, Illinois, a city
- Sumner, Iowa, a city
- Sumner, Maine, a town
- Sumner, Michigan, an unincorporated community in Sumner Township
- Sumner, Mississippi, a town
- Sumner, Missouri, a city
- Sumner, Nebraska, a village
- Sumner, Oklahoma, an unincorporated community and census-designated place
- Sumner, Oregon, an unincorporated community
- Sumner, Portland, Oregon, a neighborhood
- Sumner, Texas, an unincorporated community
- Sumner, Washington, a city
- Sumner, Barron County, Wisconsin, a town
  - Sumner (community), Barron County, Wisconsin, an unincorporated community
- Sumner, Jefferson County, Wisconsin, a town
- Sumner, Trempealeau County, Wisconsin, a town
- Sumner County, Kansas
- Sumner County, Tennessee
- Sumner Township (disambiguation)
- Fort Sumner, a former military fort in New Mexico in the 1860s
- Fort Sumner (Maine), a coastal defense fortification built in Portland, Maine, in 1794
- Fort Sumner (Maryland), a Civil War fort in Bethesda, Maryland
- Sumner Strait, Alaska

=== Outer space ===
- Sumner (crater), a crater on the Moon

== People ==
- Sumner (given name)
- Sumner (surname)
  - Sumner family, a prominent family in the Eastern United States

== Schools ==
=== United States ===
- Sumner College, a private for-profit nursing school in Portland, Oregon
- Sumner High School (disambiguation)
- Abbe Creek School, originally Sumner School, a former one-room schoolhouse near Mount Vernon, Iowa
- Sumner Elementary School, Topeka, Kansas, involved in the Brown v. Board of Education of Topeka case in 1954

=== New Zealand ===
- Van Asch College, formerly Sumner School for the Deaf, Sumner, Christchurch

== Ships ==
- USS Sumner, multiple ships
- Allen M. Sumner-class destroyer, a World War II United States Navy class
- SS Charles Sumner, a World War II Liberty ship
- SS William G. Sumner, a cargo ship acquired by the United States Navy in World War II and renamed USS Alkaid

== Transportation ==
- Sumner Bridge, Sumner, Iowa
- Sumner Tunnel, a vehicular tunnel in Boston, Massachusetts
- Sumner station, a train station in Sumner, Washington
- Sumner Avenue station (BMT Lexington Avenue Line), a former New York City Subway station in Brooklyn
- Sumner Avenue station (BMT Myrtle Avenue Line), a former New York City Subway station also in Brooklyn

== Other uses ==
- Viscount Sumner, a title in the British peerage
- Sumner (band), an Australian R&B-inspired electronic duo
- Sumner Dam, on the Pecos River in New Mexico
- Sumner Group, a sedimentary geologic group of Lower Permian age in Kansas, Oklahoma and Nebraska
- Sumner v. Shuman, a 1987 United States Supreme Court case

== See also ==
- Lord Sumner (disambiguation)
- Bank of Sumner, a historic building in Sumner, Iowa, United States
- Sumner method, a way of finding a ship's location at sea
- Summer (disambiguation)
- Summoner (disambiguation)
- Sumner Hill (disambiguation)
