= USS Sumner =

Sumner has been the name of four ships in the United States Navy. The destroyers, DD-333 and DD-692, were named after World War I Marine Corps Captain Allen Melancthon Sumner. The survey ships, AGS-5 and T-AGS-61, were named after the 19th century Navy captain Thomas Hubbard Sumner.

- The first USS Sumner (DD-333) was a Clemson-class destroyer commissioned in 1921 and decommissioned in 1930.
- The second USS Sumner (AGS-5) was originally the submarine tender Bushnell; commissioned in 1915, converted to a survey ship in World War II, and a participant in the nuclear tests at Bikini Atoll; decommissioned in 1946.
- The third USS Allen M. Sumner (DD-692), the lead ship of her class, was an Allen M. Sumner-class destroyer commissioned in 1944 and decommissioned in 1973.
- The fourth USNS Sumner (T-AGS-61) is a Pathfinder-class survey ship that became operational in 1997.
