= Thomas R. Cooley =

American Vice admiral

Thomas Ross Cooley
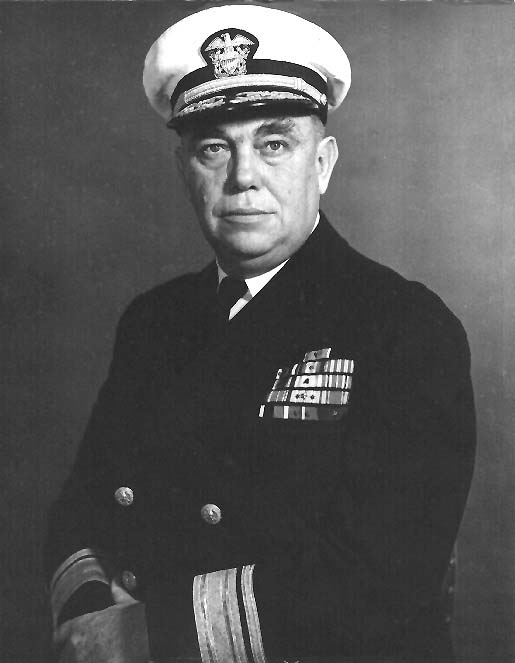
- VADM Thomas R. Cooley, USN
- Born: June 26, 1893; Grass Valley, California, US
- Died: November 28, 1959 (aged 66); Quantico, Virginia, US
- Military career
- Allegiance: United States of America
- Branch: United States Navy
- Service years: 1917-1952
- Rank: Vice Admiral
- Commands: Naval Station Newport; United States Fourth Fleet; Battleship Division 6 USS Washington; USS Almaack
- Conflicts: World War I Yangtze Patrol; Nicaraguan Campaign; World War II: Battle of Saipan; Battle of Tinian; Recapture of Guam; Battle of Leyte; Battle of Iwo Jima; Battle of Okinawa
- Awards: Legion of Merit; Commendation Medal (2)

Thomas Ross Cooley (June 26, 1893 – November 28, 1959) was a decorated officer in the United States Navy with the rank of Vice Admiral. A veteran of two world wars, he distinguished himself as commanding officer of battleship USS Washington during Mariana Islands campaign and later as Commander, Battleship Division Six during the battles of Iwo Jima and Okinawa.

Following the War, Cooley served as Commander, United States Fourth Fleet and Commandant, Naval Station Newport and completed his service as Deputy Commander, Western Sea Frontier and Deputy Commander Pacific Reserve Fleet with headquarters in San Francisco, California in June 1952.

== Early career ==
Thomas R. Cooley was born on June 26, 1893, in Grass Valley, California, the son of Pianos commission agent, Thomas R. Cooley Sr. and Mary Adelaide Cota. He graduated from the high school in his hometown and earned an appointment to the United States Naval Academy at Annapolis, Maryland in summer 1913. While at the academy, Cooley was active in German Class committee and was nicknamed "Ross" and "Sosh".

Among his classmates were future four star admirals Donald B. Duncan, Frank G. Fahrion, Albert G. Noble, Harold B. Sallada, Felix B. Stump; Vice admirals Francis C. Denebrink, Carl F. Holden, Ingolf N. Kiland, Allan R. McCann; and Rear admirals Guy W. Clark, Merrill Comstock, Elliott M. Senn and Robert G. Tobin.

Due to the World War I, his class was speeded up and Cooley graduated with Bachelor of Science degree on March 29, 1917. He was commissioned Ensign on that date and was attached to the battleship USS Florida, which was later assigned to the Sixth Battleship Squadron of the British Grand Fleet. Cooley participated in the escorting of convoys and was promoted consecutively to the temporary ranks of Lieutenant (junior grade) and Lieutenant. He also witnessed surrender of German High Seas Fleet on November 21, 1918.

Cooley returned to the United States in October 1920 and was ordered to the Bethlehem Shipbuilding Corporation in San Francisco, California for duty in connection with fitting out of destroyer USS Sumner. The Sumner was commissioned in May 1921 with Lieutenant Commander Donald B. Beary in command and Cooley served as ship's navigator during the patrol cruises with the Pacific Fleet. He later served in the same capacity aboard destroyer USS Shirk prio he was detached in October 1922. Cooley was then ordered back to the Naval Academy, where he served as an instructor in the Department of Ordnance and Gunnery until July 1924.

He was subsequently ordered to the Asiatic Station, where he joined destroyer USS Pruitt under Lieutenant Commander Joel W. Bunkley as his navigator and then executive officer. Cooley began his second tour at the Naval Academy as an instructor in the Department of Ordnance and Gunnery in March 1927 and was promoted to the rank of Lieutenant commander on November 6, 1928.

In April 1929, Cooley was attached to the staff of Commander, Special Service Squadron and served as Aide and Flag lieutenant to Rear admiral Edward H. Campbell. He served in this capacity aboard cruiser USS Rochester and participated in the patrols in the Caribbean during the United States occupation of Nicaragua for which he won Nicaraguan Presidential Medal of Merit with Diploma.

Cooley assumed command of destroyer USS Yarnall in January 1932 and operated her with the Scouting Fleet along the East Coast and Atlantic until May that year, when he was ordered to Washington, D.C. for duty in Bureau of Navigation. He was ordered back for sea duty in June 1934, when he joined light cruiser USS Concord as Gunnery officer under Captain Alexander Sharp Jr.

He took part in the patrols off Hawaii, Alaska, and in the Panama Canal Zone, before he was promoted to Commander on June 30, 1937, and ordered back to the Naval Academy for duty in the Department of Seamanship and Navigation. Cooley was appointed Executive officer of heavy cruiser USS Wichita in June 1940 and took part as the part of Cruiser Division 7 in goodwill cruise to South America.

== World War II ==
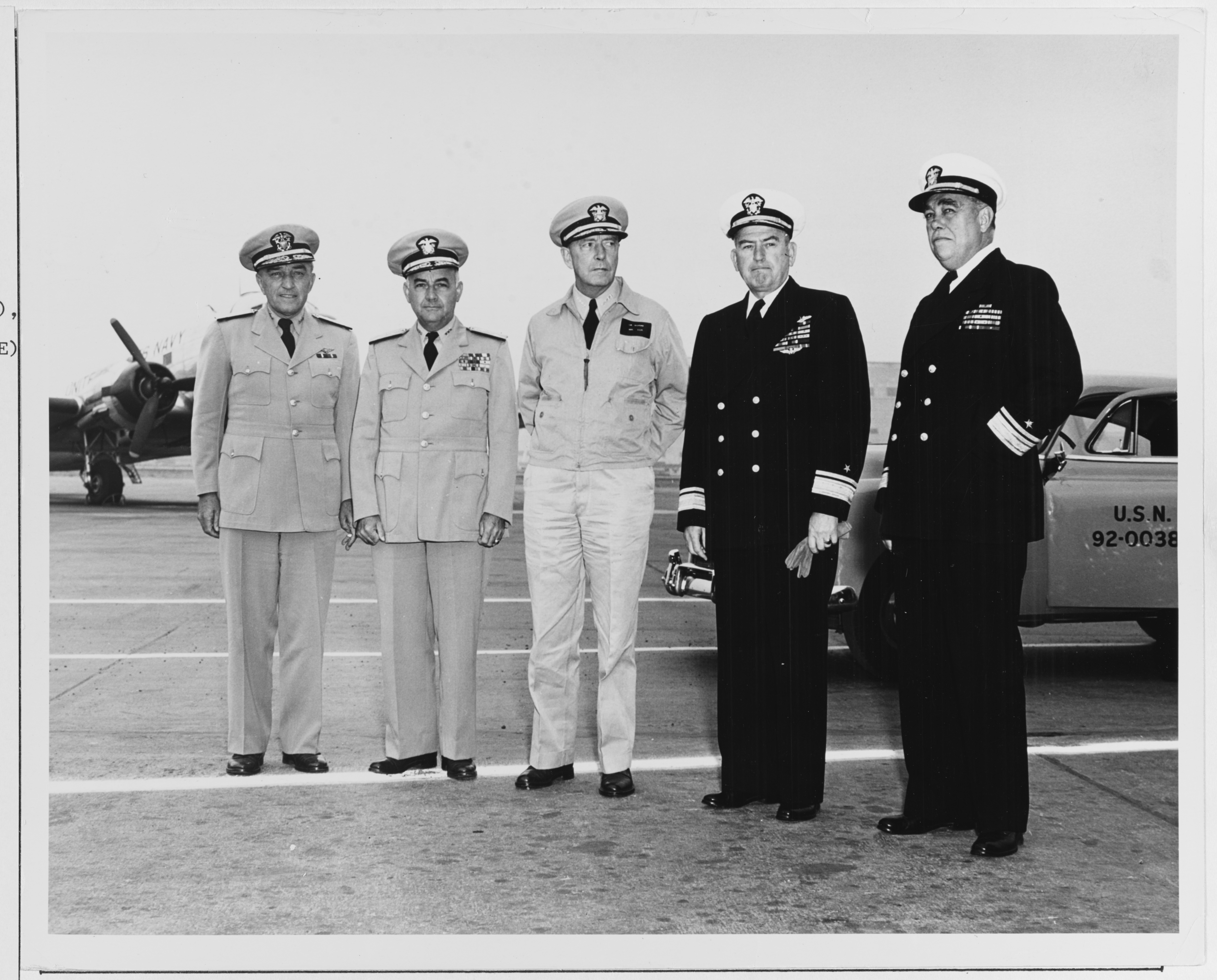
Admirals at Moffet Field in July 1951, from left to right: Thomas L. Sprague, Arthur D. Struble, Arthur W. Radford, Bertram J. Rodgers and Cooley.

Cooley assumed command of newly commissioned attack cargo ship USS Almaack in June 1941 and took part in the transporting of troops and supplies to Iceland. Following the United States entry into World War II, Cooley was promoted to the temporary rank of Captain on January 1, 1942, and commanded Almaack during transports of Army troops to Belfast, Northern Ireland, and sailors to man the new naval operating base being established at Derry.

The Almaack was transferred to South Pacific in April 1942 and after completing convoy duty to Tonga in the Polynesia, Cooley was transferred to Washington, D.C. for duty as Director of Officer Distribution at the Bureau of Naval Personnel under Rear admiral Randall Jacobs. Cooley was subsequently appointed Director of Officer Personnel during the height of the War Mobilization Period and received Navy Commendation Medal for his service at the Bureau of Personnel.

In April 1944, Cooley was ordered back to South Pacific and assumed command of battleship USS Washington, a part of Battleship Division 6 (CruDiv6) under Vice admiral Willis Augustus Lee. He led Washington during the Mariana Islands campaign in June–August 1944 and participated in the capture of Saipan, Tinian, and Guam. The Washington then conducted the preliminary raids softening Luzon, preceding its capture, and took part in the Battle of Leyte Gulf, where CruDiv6 (including Washington) went north and prevented the northern Japanese Force from joining the other Japanese ships in the Battle of Surigao Strait.

Cooley was promoted to the temporary rank of Rear admiral in November 1944 and relieved admiral Lee in command of Battleship Division 6 (CruDiv6). His command consisted of his previous command, Washington and North Carolina, and he subsequently led his division to Ulithi for repairs and loading of ammunition. Cooley's division returned to the combat zone in late December 1944 and then took part in the support of the landings on Iwo Jima and Okinawa in early 1945. For his service in South Pacific, Cooley received Legion of Merit with Combat "V" and second Navy Commendation Medal.

== Postwar career ==
Following the surrender of Japan, Cooley took part in the ceremony aboard battleship USS Missouri in Tokyo Bay on September 2, 1945. He then returned to the United States for duty as Commander Cruisers and Battleship, Atlantic Fleet and later assumed duty as Commander-in-Chief, United States Fourth Fleet, which was responsible for the transportation of troops returning stateside from European battlefield. His command later served as a Reserve Fleet and Cooley was responsible for the Reserve Training Program in support of National Emergency Plan.

He was placed in command of a task unit and made Commander of the Midshipmen's Practice Squadron, before he was appointed Commander of Naval Station Newport, a home to the Naval War College and the Naval Justice School in January 1947. While in this capacity, he served as acting President of the Naval War College following the retirement of Vice admiral Donald B. Beary.

In October 1950, he was ordered to Treasure Island, San Francisco, California for duty as Deputy Commander Western Sea Frontier and Deputy Commander Pacific Reserve Fleet under Vice admiral John L. Hall Jr. and remained in this capacity until then end of June 1952, when he retired after 35 years of service. Cooley was advanced to the rank of Vice Admiral on the retired list for having been specially commended in combat.

== Death ==
Following the retirement from the Navy, Cooley settled in San Francisco California]] and was active in the Naval Order of the United States, was a member of the United States Naval Institute, and United States Naval Academy Alumni Association. He died from a heart attack on November 28, 1959, while on the visit of his youngest daughter, Mary Lawrence Aitken at Quantico, Virginia at the age of 66. Vice admiral Cooley was buried together with his wife, at Monticello National Park Grounds in Charlottesville, Virginia. They had three daughters Adelaide, Mary and Margaret.

== Decorations ==
Here is the ribbon bar of Vice admiral Cooley:

| 1st Row | Legion of Merit with Combat "V" | | Navy Commendation Medal with Combat "V" and one 5/16" Gold Star |
| 2nd Row | World War I Victory Medal with Fleet Clasp | Second Nicaraguan Campaign Medal | Yangtze Service Medal |
| 3rd Row | American Defense Service Medal with "A" Device | American Campaign Medal | European-African-Middle Eastern Campaign Medal |
| 4th Row | Asiatic–Pacific Campaign Medal with one silver and two bronze 3/16 inch service stars | World War II Victory Medal | Navy Occupation Service Medal |
| 5th Row | National Defense Service Medal | Philippine Liberation Medal with two stars | Nicaraguan Presidential Medal of Merit with Diploma |

== See also ==
- USS Washington
