= Sumner Township, Illinois =

Sumner Township, Illinois may refer to one of the following townships:

- Sumner Township, Kankakee County, Illinois
- Sumner Township, Warren County, Illinois

See also

- Sumner Township (disambiguation)
