= Summon (disambiguation) =

To summon is to call a spirit, demon, deity or other supernatural agent, in the Western mystery tradition.

Summon may also refer to:

- To issue a summons
- Summon (company), a vehicle-for-hire company in California
- Summon (database), a discovery service for library content
- Summon (Final Fantasy), a recurring element in the Final Fantasy series

== See also ==
- Summoning (disambiguation)
- Summoned (disambiguation)
- Summons (disambiguation)
- Summoner (disambiguation)
