= Allen Melancthon Sumner =

20th-century United States Marine Corps officer

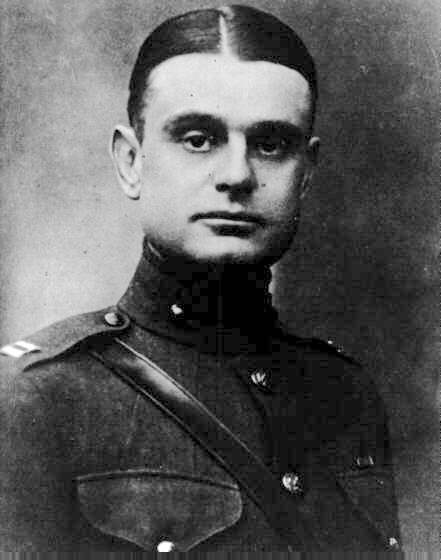
Allen Melancthon Sumner

Allen Melancthon Sumner Jr. (October 1, 1882 – July 19, 1918) was an officer in the United States Marine Corps.

== Biography ==
Born in Boston, Massachusetts, he initially went to Harvard before securing a place in the Naval Academy. On March 17, 1907, Sumner was commissioned a Second Lieutenant in the Marine Corps. Until 1909 he was stationed in turn at the Marine Barracks of the Naval Academy, Annapolis, Maryland, and Norfolk Navy Yard. He was then ordered to Cuba with the 1st Provisional Regiment of Marines in the Army of Cuban Pacification. In December 1909, he served on temporary duty on USS Prairie. He retired on January 1, 1914, after seven years service.

Sumner was recalled as soon as war was declared in April 1917, and began serving on active duty at Marine Barracks, Quantico, on July 5, 1917. When the 1st Machine Gun Battalion (MGB) was formed in August, Sumner was assigned to 81st Company. Sumner's war record is as follows: Sailed from New York on December 14, 1917, on USS DeKalb, arriving in St Nazaire on December 31. Sumner trained in the Vosges and was in the front lines in March at Mont-sur-la-Cote on the Verdun Front. On April 29, relieved Major Waller in Command of 81st Company when Major Waller was transferred to the 3rd Division to command the 8th MGB. Participated in the action at Belleau Wood and when Major Cole was wounded on June 10, and Captain Major became battalion commander in his stead (himself to fall five days later), Sumner took his place in command of the right front.

Captain Sumner's death occurred no more than a month later on July 19, at Vierzy, near Soissons, where the 6th MGB was to take part in the attack on Tigny. He was hit by a fragment of a High Explosive shell and killed instantly. Later it was debated whether he had instead fallen during an air raid. Captain Sumner received the Croix de Guerre with Gilt Star as well as 3 Silver Star Citations. He is buried in Plot A, Row 13, Grave 25 in the Aisne-Marne American Cemetery and Memorial.

== Namesakes ==
The USS Sumner (DD-333) was a ship of the United States Navy (USN) during the interwar period. During World War II, Sumner was honoured as the namesake of the newly developed Allen M. Sumner-class destroyers, a class of 58 destroyers, of which the lead ship was USS Allen M. Sumner (DD-692).

Note that two other Sumners, the survey ships USS Sumner (AGS-5) and USNS Sumner (T-AGS-61), were named for 19th century Navy captain Thomas Hubbard Sumner.
