= Summoning (disambiguation) =

Summoning is the act of calling or summoning a spirit, demon, deity or other supernatural agent, in the Western mystery tradition.

Summoning or The Summoning may also refer to:

== Film and television ==
- "The Summoning" (Babylon 5), an episode of Babylon 5
- The Summoning, the UK release name of the 2016 film more widely known as Planetarium
- The Summoning, a 2017 animation short aired as part of Go! Cartoons
- The Summoning (film), a 2018 Sri Lankan horror short film

== Literature ==
- The Summoning (novel), a 2008 Darkest Powers novel by Kelley Armstrong
- The Summoning, a 1993 novel by Bentley Little
- The Summoning, a 2001 novel by Troy Denning

== Music ==
- Summoning (band), an Austrian black metal band
- The Summoning (album), a 2011 album by Glamour of the Kill
- "The Summoning", a spoken-word segment by Twilight Force from the album Tales of Ancient Prophecies
- "The Summoning", a song by Kiuas from The New Dark Age
- "The Summoning", a song by Linkin Park from The Hunting Party
- "The Summoning", a song by Sleep Token from Take Me Back to Eden

== Video gaming ==
- The Summoning (video game), a 1992 isometric-view fantasy role-playing game
- Summoning, a game mechanic in the Final Fantasy video game series

== See also ==
- Summon (disambiguation)
- Summoned (disambiguation)
- Summons (disambiguation)
- Summoner (disambiguation)
