= Summoner =

Summoner may refer to:

== Magic and religion ==
- Summoner, a person who practices evocation, the act of summoning a supernatural agent
- Apparitor, or summoner, an officer of an ecclesiastical court
- Summoner (Wicca), a position in a Wiccan coven

== Arts and entertainment ==
=== Literature ===
- The Summoner, a character in "The Summoner's Tale"
- The Summoner, a 2007 novel by Gail Z. Martin
- Summoner (comics), a character in Marvel Comics

=== Video games ===
- Summoner (video game), a 2000 video game
  - Summoner 2, a 2002 video game
- Summoner, a League of Legends player

== Other uses ==
- Summoner (horse) (foaled 1997), British Thoroughbred racehorse

== See also ==
- Summon (disambiguation)
- Summoned (disambiguation)
- Summoning (disambiguation)
- Summons (disambiguation)
- Sumner (disambiguation)
