= Summons (disambiguation) =

A summons is a legal document issued by a court.

The Summons may also refer to:

- The Summons (Mason novel), a 1920 novel by A. E. W. Mason
- The Summons (Grisham novel), a 2002 novel by John Grisham
- "The Summons" (hymn), a Christian hymn

== People with the surname ==
- Arthur Summons (1935–2020), Australian representative rugby union and rugby league player

== See also ==
- Summon or evocation, the act of conjuring supernatural creatures
- Summoning (disambiguation)
- Summoned (disambiguation)
- Summoner (disambiguation)
