= Sumner Schools =

Sumner Schools may refer to:

- Sumner County Schools, a school district in Sumner County, Tennessee, United States
- Sumner School District, a school district in Pierce County, Washington, United States
- Charles Sumner School, established in 1872, one of the earliest schools for African Americans in Washington, D.C.

== See also ==
- Sumner High School (disambiguation)
- Sumner Elementary School
- Van Asch College, formerly Sumner School for the Deaf
- Abbe Creek School, formerly Sumner School
