= Glamour of the Kill =

British metalcore band

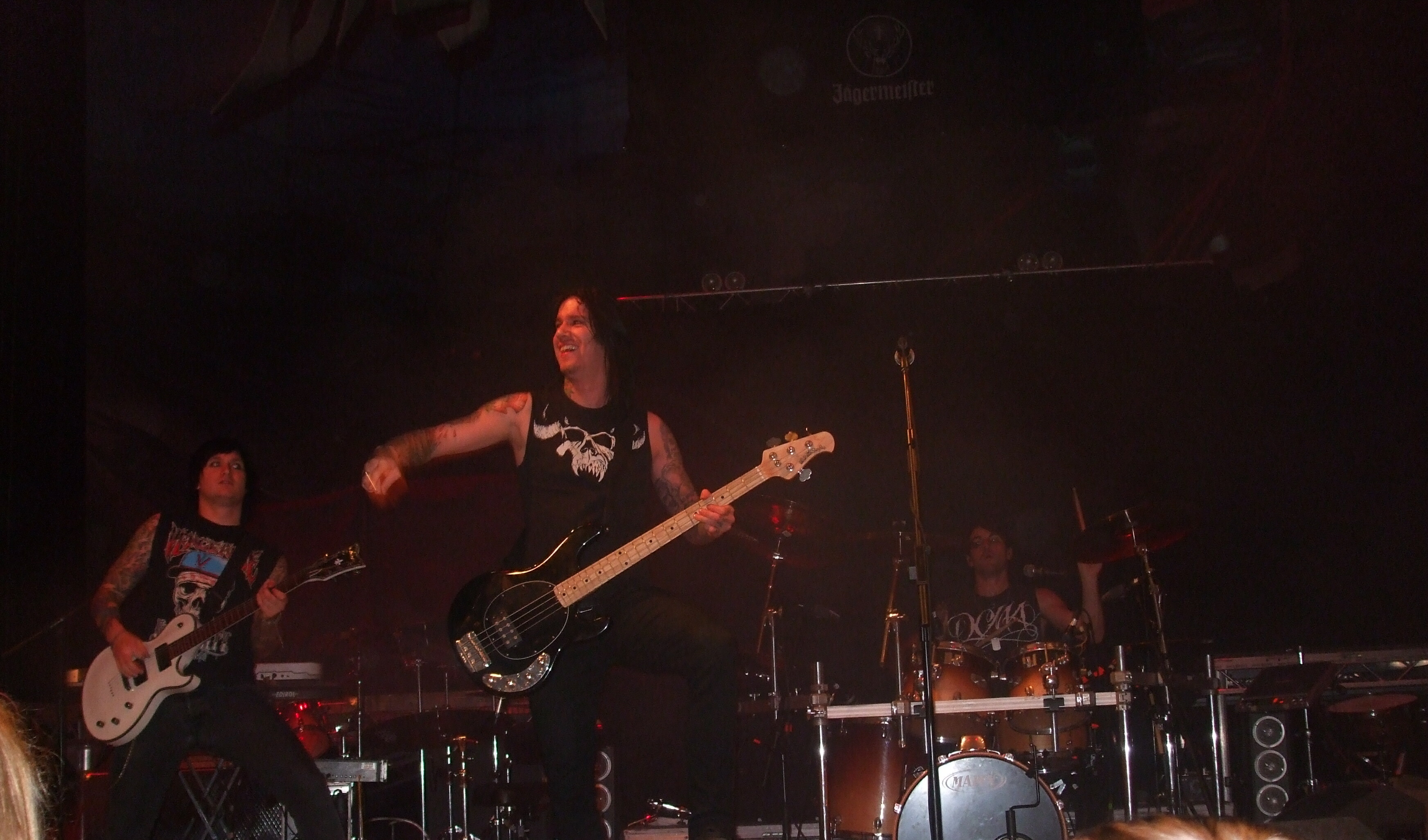
- Glamour of the Kill performing in 2009

Background information
- Also known as: GOTK
- Origin: York, North Yorkshire, England
- Genres: Metalcore, post-hardcore
- Years active: 2007–2015, 2018–2019, 2025–present
- Label: Siege of Amida
- Members: Davey Richmond; Mike Kingswood; Sam Brookes; Josh Hardy

Glamour of the Kill (sometimes abbreviated as GOTK) are an English metalcore band from York. They had a Kerrang! video of the week with the track "Feeling Alive".

== History ==
"Glamour of the Kill" were formed in January 2007. They take their name from a line in the title track of He Is Legend's 2004 album, I Am Hollywood. The band's mainstream popularity was assisted by a 10/10 Metal Hammer review for their debut demo EP, Through the Dark They March. This led to tours with Bullet for My Valentine, Darkest Hour and Avenged Sevenfold.

They have cited major influences as Iron Maiden, Metallica, Slayer, Pantera, Megadeth, Judas Priest, Black Sabbath, The Misfits, Black Flag, The Ramones, Nirvana, Sepultura, As I Lay Dying, Killswitch Engage, and Korn.

=== 2008 ===
In 2008, the band released their first licensed EP, Glamour of the Kill, with independent label Siege of Amida Records. This EP contained a re-recorded version of one of the previous EP's tracks, "Rise From Your Grave". Glamour of the Kill was given positive ratings from critics throughout the UK.

On 15 June, the band made an appearance at Download Festival alongside Coheed & Cambria, In Flames, Within Temptation and others.

=== 2009 ===
2009 saw the band support the likes of Escape The Fate and Wednesday 13. As well as this, GOTK played at the UK leg of Sonisphere, a European festival headlined by Metallica and Linkin Park. This later led to the band touring with DragonForce in the UK in the winter of 2009, along with Sabaton and Sylosis. The track "A Hope in Hell" was also featured on the game Dirt 2.

=== 2010 ===
In 2010, the band played Eurosonic Festival, a massive 38-date headline UK tour with support from Yashin titled "In for the Kill". The band have also appeared at Powerfest, Amsterdam. They also played the Red Bull stage at Download Festival 2010.

On 28 October 2010, the band announced their first studio album, The Summoning. A statement from the band via email to the G.O.L.D Members read "We are very happy to announce that our debut album "The Summoning" will be hitting all stores across Europe on 24 January 2011."

On 13 November 2010, the band released the video for the first single off the upcoming album: "Feeling Alive". The video then went on to become an exclusive on Kerrang! - becoming Video of the Week.

=== The Summoning (2011) ===
On 24 January 2011, Glamour of the Kill released their first full studio album - The Summoning. This album was supported by a 29-date tour of the UK, starting on 17 February at The Lamp in Hull, with the final date on 2 April; when the band played The Cockpit in Leeds. They continued their presence in the Dirt video game series, with "Feeling Alive" being on the soundtrack of Dirt 3.

On 5 October, Glamour of the Kill were one of the support acts for Forever the Sickest Kids UK tour, along with Decade and Action Item. They played in Norwich, Birmingham, Manchester, Leeds, Glasgow, Cardiff, Portsmouth and London. The tour ended on 13 October.

For the first time, Glamour of the Kill played their full debut album in its entirety in Manchester, Newcastle, York and Leicester from 15 to 18 December.

=== Savages (2012–2015) ===
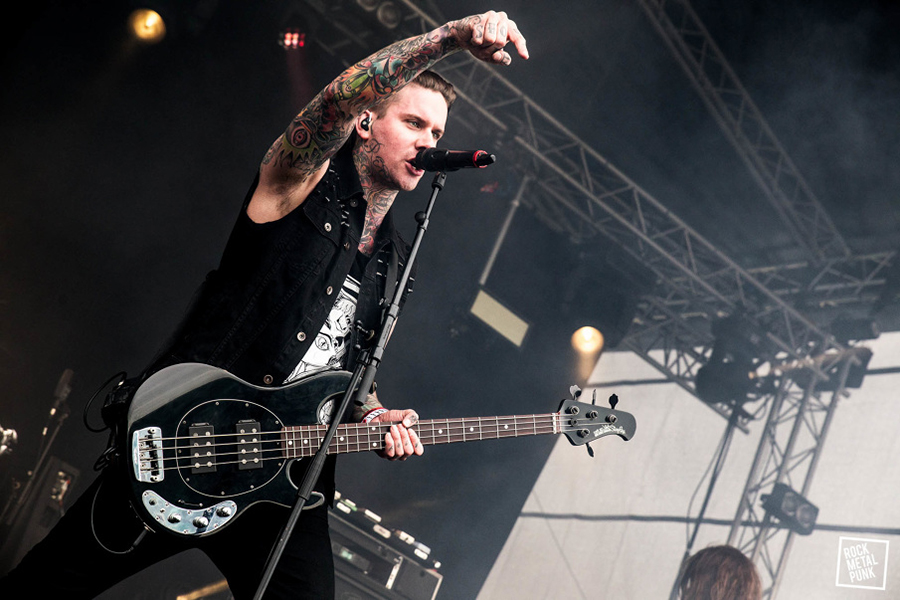
Lead singer Davey Richmond performing at Breakout Festival, 2014

The band opened for We Came as Romans and Alesana along with Iwrestledabearonce across Europe and the UK in Jan/Feb. They then joined a European tour with Yashin and Dear Superstar across Europe in March/April. They were then added as the local support for the Newcastle date of the 2012 Jägermeister Music Tour, supporting Skindred, Therapy? and Black Spiders. The event was performed at the O2 Academy in Newcastle upon Tyne on Thursday 12 April 2012. Shortly after the band signed to eOne Entertainment Music worldwide. October/November saw the band fly out for their first tour of the US on the Inked Music Tour along with Alesana, In Fear and Faith, Vampires Everywhere! and This or the Apocalypse. Nov/Dec Band enter the studio to work on their second full-length album with producer Joey Sturgis and engineer Nick Scott. On 16 July, the first single off the band's upcoming second album, Savages, was released, entitled "Break".

On 3 September, the new music video for "Second Chance" was released on YouTube.

In September 2013, Glamour of the Kill toured alongside The Defiled as the support to Motionless in White on their Infamous UK Tour 2013.

In March and April 2014, the band toured as main support for Heaven's Basement on their Welcome Home Tour.

On 22 July 2015, the band announced that they were splitting up via an official statement on their Facebook page:

"The time has come for us to bring GOTK to a close for now. Whether or not we revisit this in the future is undecided, but we have no plans to write, record or tour.

[...] Music has been no way of us affording to live, pay bills, or do anything functioning human beings do. The massive cost associated with touring internationally means putting every single penny back into everything else. It has come to a point where we need to take a step back from this, and focus on other careers just to allow ourselves to get by.

[...] It is with heavy hearts we must bid you all farewell."

=== Resurrection and sporadic appearances (2018–present) ===
On 17 March 2018, the band officially announced their comeback.

On 23 October 2018, the band released a new single called "Fire Fight" from the new upcoming album "Resurrection". The track was mixed and mastered by Innersound Audio Recording Studio.

On 4 January 2019, the music video for "Resurrection", the title track off of the album, was released via the band's YouTube channel. The track was mixed and mastered by Innersound Audio Recording Studio.

After the release of "Resurrection" the band went quiet, making only a few posts on social media before disappearing entirely. The final post on Facebook was made on 17 November 2019; marking the 5 year anniversary since the EP After Hours.

As of 2020 it appears as though GOTK are no longer together as the members do not seem to be working together.

At the beginning of 2022, Davey began fronting a band called "DeadFlight" who released their debut album "Arrival" on 20 January 2022 and follow up EP "No Love Lost" in 2024. Mike and Ben appear to be working outside the music industry.

On 19 May 2025 GOTK posted a cryptic message on their Facebook page simply "30.05.2025" with a burning candle video.

In October 2026, Glamour of the Kill announced a 20th anniversary concert at York Barbican on 21 August 2027.

== Band members ==
Current

- Davey Richmond – lead vocals, bass (2007–2015, 2018–2019, 2025–present)
- Mike Kingswood – lead guitar, backing vocals (2007–2015, 2018–2019, 2025–present)
- Sam Brookes – rhythm guitar, backing vocals (2025–present)
- Josh Hardy – drums (2026–present)

Former

- Chris Gomerson – rhythm guitar, backing vocals (2007–2015)
- Craig Robinson – rhythm guitar, backing vocals (2018–2019)
- Ben Thomson – drums, backing vocals (2007–2015, 2018–2019, 2025–2026)

== Discography ==
Studio albums

- The Summoning (2011)
- Savages (2013)
- Vengeance (2026)

EPs

- Through the Darkness They March (2007)
- Glamour of the Kill (2008)
- After Hours (2014)

Compilations

- Maiden Heaven: A Tribute to Iron Maiden, 2 Minutes to Midnight. (16 July 2008)

Single

- Fire Fight (2018-10-23)
- Resurrection (2019-01-04)
- Grace of God (2025-05-30)
- Vengeance (2025-07-03)
- Feed them to the Pigs (2025-08-14)
