= After Hours (EP) =

EP by Glamour of the Kill
- Released: 17 November 2014
- Genre: Metalcore
- Length: 14:57
- Label: Siege of Amida
- Producer: Glamour of the Kill

Glamour of the Kill chronology
Savages (2013)	After Hours (2014)	Resurrection (2019)

After Hours is the third EP by English metalcore band Glamour of the Kill. It was released on 17 November 2014 after a kickstarter campaign. Glasswerk Magazine called the EP "a slightly grittier affair than the band’s sophomore album, but it seems the four-piece are choosing to stick to their winning formula of pop-rock hooks and 80s-metal-inspired riffage. The EP features guest vocals from Craig Mabbitt of Escape The Fate and Jacoby Shaddix of Papa Roach."

== History ==
Funded via Kickstarter after the band parted ways with their management and record company, the album will be released on 17 November 2014, through Siege of Amida Records. The single "Out of Control" (featuring Jacoby Shaddix of Papa Roach) was released on 5 October 2014, and was premiered on BBC Radio 1 Rock Show. Two weeks later, they announced pre-orders for the album.

Glasswerk Magazine stated in a review that "the EP is a slightly grittier affair than the band’s sophomore album, but it seems the four-piece are choosing to stick to their winning formula of pop-rock hooks and 80s-metal-inspired riffage."

== Track listing ==
All tracks are written by Glamour of the Kill.

No.	Title	Length
1.	"Lights Down"	2:52
2.	"We Are All Cursed"	3:06
3.	"Out of Control" (featuring Jacoby Shaddix of Papa Roach)	3:28
4.	"Earthquake" (featuring Craig Mabbitt of Escape the Fate)	2:44
5.	"Blood Drunk"	3:27
Total length:		15:39

== Personnel ==
Glamour of the Kill

- Davey Richmond - lead vocals, bass guitar
- Mike Kingswood - guitars, backing vocals
- Chris Gomerson - guitars, backing vocals
- Ben Thomson - drums, backing vocals

Additional Musicians

- Jacoby Shaddix - vocals on "Out of Control"
- Craig Mabbitt - vocals on "Earthquake"
