= Summoned =

Summoned may refer to:

- Summoned (film), 2013 American television film
- Evocation, supernatural practice
- Summons, legal document

== See also ==
- Summon (disambiguation)
- Summoning (disambiguation)
- Summons (disambiguation)
- Summoner (disambiguation)
