= John L. Bell =

Scottish hymnwriter, minister, and author

The Reverend John L. Bell
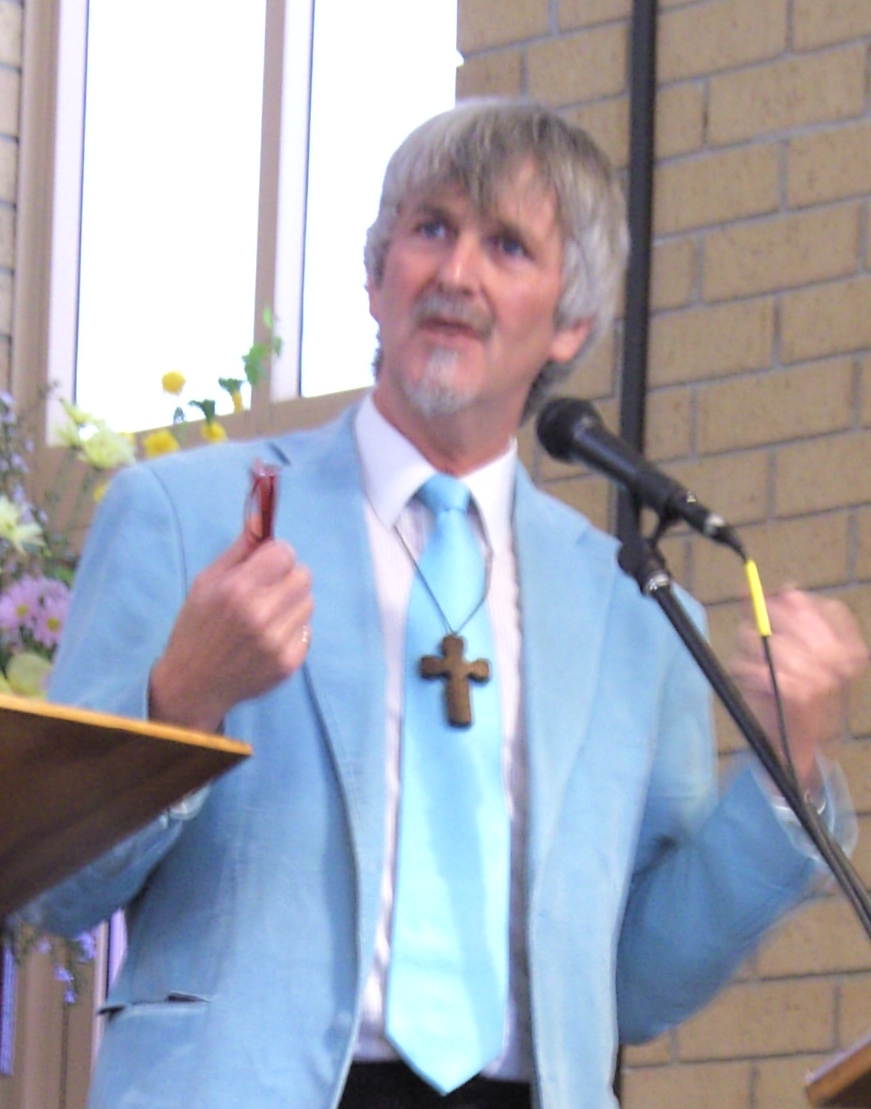
- Bell speaking in 2009
- Born: November 20, 1949 (age 76); Kilmarnock, Ayrshire, Scotland
- Citizenship: United Kingdom
- Education: University of Glasgow
- Notable work: Church Hymnary (Fourth Edition)

Rector of the University of Glasgow
- In office 1977–1980
- Preceded by: Arthur Montford
- Succeeded by: Reginald Bosanquet

John Lamberton Bell (born 1949) is a Scottish hymn-writer and Church of Scotland minister. He is a member of the Iona Community, a broadcaster, and former student activist. He works throughout the world, lecturing in theological colleges in the UK, Canada and the United States, but is primarily concerned with the renewal of congregational worship at the grass roots level.

== Student activism ==
Bell studied at the University of Glasgow where in 1974 he was elected President of the Students' Representative Council. His election represented a significant development as it was the start of a few years' control by the left wing of the SRC. Bell was quite open about his Christian religious beliefs, wearing a wooden pectoral cross.

In 1977 he was elected Rector of the University of Glasgow, while he was still a student. This was part of a trend for student rectors in Scotland at that time (which included Gordon Brown at the University of Edinburgh) but the rules were later changed to prevent students from standing for this post.

== Music career ==
After a period in the Netherlands and two posts in church youth work, Bell became employed full-time in the areas of music and worship with the Wild Goose Resource Group. He is a past convener of the Church of Scotland's Panel on Worship and also convened the committee to revise the Church Hymnary. In 1987, he wrote the hymn "The Summons".

In 1999, Bell was honoured by the Presbyterian Church in Canada and the Royal School of Church Music which bestowed a Fellowship on him. In 2002, he was awarded an honorary doctorate by the University of Glasgow.

Bell has produced (sometimes in collaboration with Graham Maule) many collections of original hymns and songs and two collections of songs of the World Church. These are published by the Iona Community in Scotland and by G.I.A. Publications (Chicago) in North America. Several collections of his work have been published in translation in Swedish, Norwegian, Finnish, Danish, Dutch, Frisian, Japanese and German.

== Broadcasting ==
He is a frequent broadcaster, and often presents programmes on the BBC, majoring on contemporary religious songs from various parts of the world. He is quite a regular contributor to "Thought for the Day", part of Radio 4's Today programme.

In 2005, the BBC apologised for a broadcast by Bell in which he said that a Muslim corporal he had met who had been conscripted into the Israeli army had been jailed for refusing to shoot Palestinian children. Neither the BBC nor the Israeli military were able to find any evidence supporting the story or the existence of a soldier fitting the description. It was further pointed out that Israeli Arabs are not subject to conscription. Bell acknowledged that two parts of his story were incorrect: the part about conscription had been an assumption on his part and he had misstated the person's age. He said: "I perfectly understand that at a time when Jewish sensitivity in Britain is running high because of anti-Semitism that part of my remarks might have been interpreted as furtive racism. However, such a conjecture would be completely untrue."

== Public speaking ==
Bell speaks to audiences across the world. In the UK, he has been associated with the Christian Arts Festival Greenbelt for many years.

== Personal life ==
In 2017, responding to the suicide of Lizzie Lowe who was afraid to tell her parents about her sexuality, John Bell came out as gay during an address at Greenbelt Festival. He had remained single because he believed that this enabled him to work without hindrance or compromise as a public Christian and fulfil his commitments in the area of worship in the Church of Scotland.

Since 2021, Bell is a patron of the Open Table Network, an ecumenical Christian community for LGBT people and their allies.

== Honours ==
In 2018, Bell received the Cranmer Award for Worship from Justin Welby, Archbishop of Canterbury, "for his outstanding Christian witness, through hymn-writing, broadcasting and social action."

== Selected works ==
=== Church Hymnary (Fourth Edition) ===
John Bell was the Convener (and music editor) of the committee which drafted the Church of Scotland's Church Hymnary (Fourth Edition). The committee first met in 1994; the Fourth Edition was finally published in 2005. Music edition: ISBN 1-85311-613-0

=== Other works ===
- And the Crowd Is Still Hungry (1978), ISBN 0-85261-154-4
- Songs of the Incarnation (1984), ISBN 0-9501351-8-6
- Poverty, Chastity and Obedience: A Vocation for Today (1985), ISBN 0-947988-00-9
- Eh... Jesus... Yes, Peter...? (1987–90)
  - Heaven Shall Not Wait: Wild Goose Songs Vol. 1 (1987), ISBN 0-947988-20-3
  - Enemy Of Apathy: Wild Goose Songs Vol. 2 (1988), ISBN 0-947988-31-9
  - Love From Below: Wild Goose Songs Vol. 3 (1990), ISBN 0-947988-43-2
- Wild Goose Prints (1990), ISBN 0-947988-41-6
- Innkeepers and Light Sleepers: Seventeen New Songs for Christmas (1992), ISBN 0-947988-47-5
- Psalms of Patience, Protest and Praise (1993), ISBN 0-947988-56-4
- Wrestle and Fight and Pray (1993), ISBN 0-7152-0681-8
- Come All You People: Shorter Songs for Worship from the Iona Community (1994), ISBN 0-947988-68-8
- He Was in the World: Meditations for Public Worship (1995), ISBN 0-947988-70-X
- The Courage to Say No: Twenty-three Songs for Lent and Easter (1996), ISBN 0-947988-78-5
- States of Bliss and Yearning: The Marks and Means of Authentic Christian Spirituality (1998), ISBN 1-901557-07-3
- There Is One Among Us: Shorter Songs for Worship (1998), ISBN 1-901557-10-3
- Jesus and Peter: A Book of Unrecorded Dialogues (1999), ISBN 1-901557-17-0
- The Singing Thing: A Case for Congregational Song (2000), ISBN 1-901557-28-6
- One Is the Body: Songs of Unity and Diversity (2002), ISBN 1-901557-35-9
- Hard Words for Interesting Times: Biblical Texts in Contemporary Contexts (2003), ISBN 1-901557-75-8
- I Will Not Sing Alone: Songs For The Seasons Of Love (2004), ISBN 978-1-901557-91-6
- The Singing Thing Too: Enabling Congregations To Sing (2007), ISBN 978-1-905010-32-5
- Thinking Out Loud: Collected Scripts From Radio 4's 'Thought For The Day' (2008), ISBN 978-1-905010-41-7
- We Walk His Way: Shorter Songs For Worship (2008), ISBN 978-1-905010-55-4
- Ten Things They Never Told Me About Jesus: A Beginner's Guide To a Larger Christ (2009), ISBN 978-1-905010-60-8
- All That Matters: Scripts from BBC Radio 4's "Thought for the Day" and Other Musings (2010), ISBN 978-1-849520-70-6

== Notes ==
Academic offices
| Preceded by Arthur Montford | Rector of the University of Glasgow; 1977–1980 | Succeeded by Reginald Bosanquet |
