= Donald B. Beary =

United States Navy officer (1888–1966)

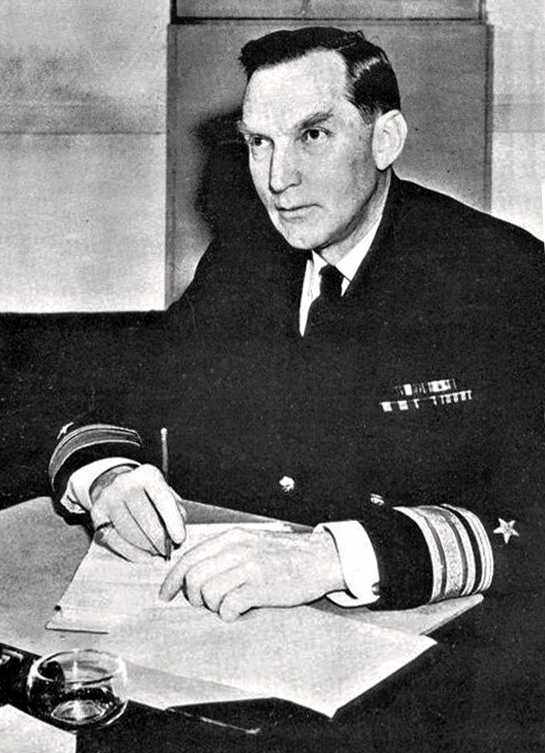
- Born: 4 December 1888; Helena, Montana, US
- Died: 7 March 1966 (aged 77); San Diego, California, US
- Burial place: United States Naval Academy Cemetery
- Military career
- Allegiance: United States of America
- Branch: United States Navy
- Service years: 1910–1950
- Rank: Vice admiral
- Nickname: "Red"
- Commands: USS Remlik (SP-157); USS Lamson (DD-18); USS Talbot (DD-114); USS Parrott (DD-218); USS Sumner (DD-333); USS Richmond (CL-9); USS Mount Vernon (AP-22); Transport Division 19; Naval Operations Base Iceland; Fleet Operational Training Command, U.S. Atlantic Fleet; Service Squadron 6; U.S. Naval Shipping Control Authority; 12th Naval District; Naval Base San Francisco; Western Sea Frontier; Pacific Reserve Fleet; President of the Naval War College
- Conflicts: World War I; Atlantic U-boat Campaign; Second Nicaraguan Campaign; World War II; Battle of the Atlantic; Pacific War; Battle of Iwo Jima; Battle of Okinawa
- Awards: Navy Cross (1918); Victory Medal, later World War I Victory Medal (1918); Second Nicaraguan Campaign Medal (1927); Yangtze Service Medal (1931); American Defense Service Medal (1941); American Campaign Medal (1941); European-African-Middle Eastern Campaign Medal (1942); Bronze Star Medal (1943); Asiatic-Pacific Campaign Medal (1944); Distinguished Service Medal (1945); Legion of Merit (two awards, 1945); World War II Victory Medal (1945); Distinguished Marksman and Pistol Shot Ribbon

Donald Bradford Beary (4 December 1888 – 7 March 1966) was a vice admiral of the United States Navy. His career included service in both World War I and World War II and a tour as President of the Naval War College. He commanded a wide variety of ships and organizations, and is particularly noted for his leadership during World War II in establishing and directing a large-scale U.S. Navy training program and for his pioneering and highly successful work as a commander of U.S. Navy underway replenishment forces.

== Naval career ==
Beary was born on 4 December 1888 in Helena, Montana. He entered the United States Naval Academy in Annapolis, Maryland, in 1906 and graduated in 1910. His first assignments were aboard three armored cruisers, USS Tennessee from 1910 to 1911, USS Washington from 1912 to 1914, and USS Maryland during 1914. He then attended Columbia University in New York City from 1915 to 1917, and received a Master of Science degree in electrical engineering from the university in 1917.

=== World War I ===
After the United States entered World War I on 6 April 1917, Beary served in the Atlantic on convoy duty and in antisubmarine warfare against German submarines, commanding the armed yacht USS Remlik (SP-157) from 1917 to 1918 and then the destroyer USS Lamson in 1918. He received the Navy Cross in 1918 for distinguished service as commanding officer of Remlik and Lamson in the Atlantic campaign.

=== Interwar ===
A lieutenant commander by the end of World War I, Beary's first post-war assignment was duty at the U.S. Navy Bureau of Navigation from 1919 to 1921. He then commanded three destroyers, USS Talbot (DD-114) in 1921, USS Parrott (DD-218) from 1921 to 1922, and USS Sumner (DD-333) from 1922 to 1923. From 1923 to 1924 he served ashore at the United States Department of the Navy in Washington, D.C., in the Division of Fleet Training, Navy Operations. He then returned to sea with duty aboard the battleship USS New Mexico (BB-40) from 1925 to 1927, seeing service in the Second Nicaraguan Campaign.

From 1928 to 1930, Beary taught at the United States Naval Academy. He then served on the staff of the Commander-in-Chief, United States Asiatic Fleet, from 1931 to 1934, seeing service on the Yangtze Patrol. From 1934 to 1935, he was assigned to duty with the Chief of Naval Operations in Washington, D.C. He then served on the staff of the Naval War College in Newport, Rhode Island, in 1936.

Beary went back to sea in 1937 as executive officer of the battleship USS Colorado (BB-45), serving aboard her until 1938, when he was promoted to captain. He then was commanding officer of the light cruiser USS Richmond (CL-9) from 1938 to 1939 before returning to duty at the United States Naval Academy, serving a second tour as an instructor there from 1939 until 1941. On 1 October 1941, he became commanding officer of both the troop transport USS Mount Vernon (AP-22) and Transport Division 19.

=== World War II ===
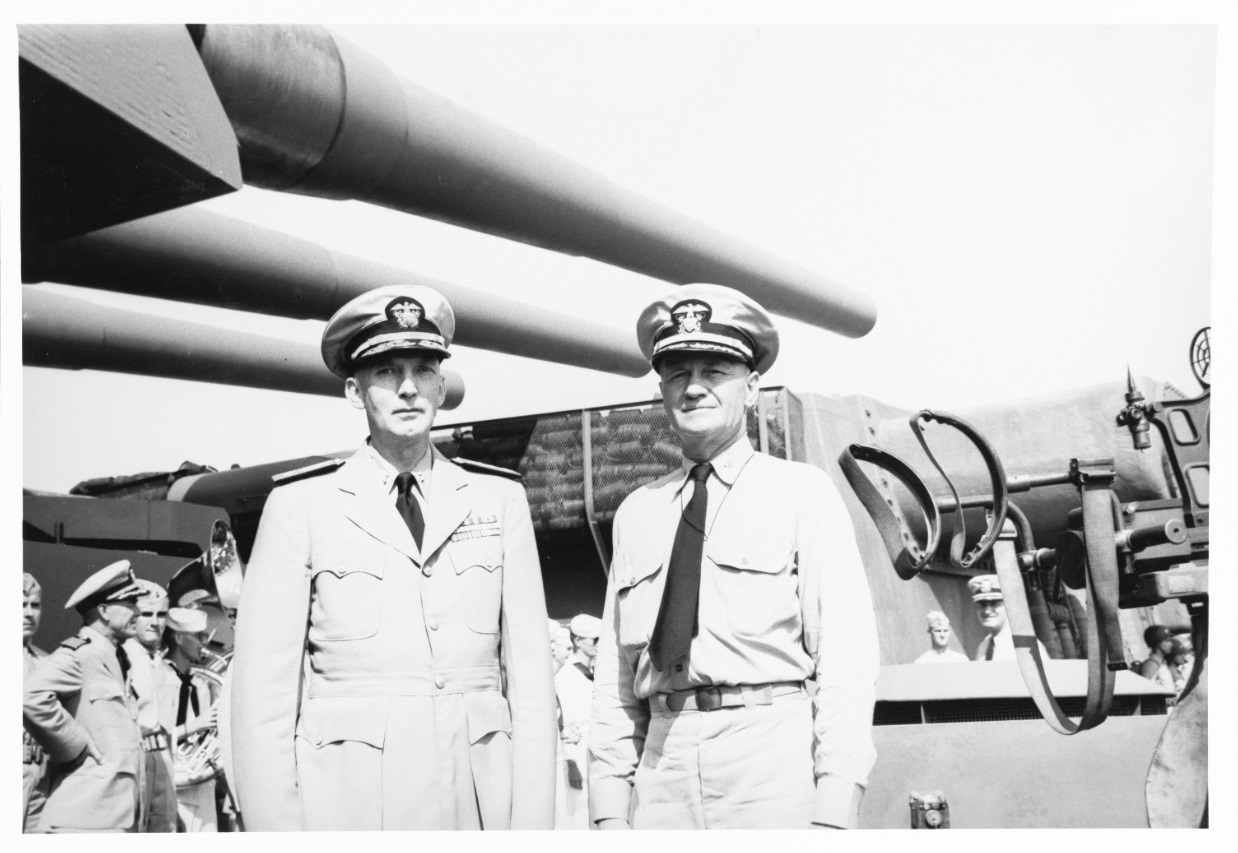
Beary (left) with Captain Carl F. Holden during inspection of battleship New Jersey at Norfolk Navy Yard in September 1943

Mount Vernon was in the Atlantic Ocean as part of a convoy steaming from Halifax, Nova Scotia, Canada, bound for Cape Town, South Africa, when the Japanese attack on Pearl Harbor brought the United States into World War II on 7 December 1941. She proceeded via the Cape of Good Hope and the Indian Ocean to Singapore, arriving there on 13 January 1942. In port until 16 January 1942, she landed desperately needed reinforcements and evacuated refugees despite frequent Japanese air raids, herself coming under air attack. She then operated in the Indian Ocean and Southwest Pacific until March 1942 to move additional reinforcements from the Middle East to Southeast Asia and evacuate refugees from Australia. Beary received the Bronze Star Medal in 1943 for meritorious achievement in these operations, and was especially cited for his conspicuous professional ability, leadership, and organization during Mount Vernon's stay in Singapore.

In July 1942, Beary became Commandant of Naval Operations Base Iceland. On 10 February 1943 he was promoted to rear admiral and took command of the United States Atlantic Fleet's Fleet Operational Training Command, which organized and trained ships' crews, upon its establishment on 14 March 1943. As its commanding officer, he oversaw the creation and operation of a number of navy training establishments along the United States East Coast, at Naval Station Guantanamo Bay, Cuba, and on Culebra Island off Puerto Rico, including a number of Anti-Aircraft Training Centers; the Anti-Aircraft Training Afloat Program aboard the antiaircraft training ship USS Wyoming (AG-17); the Combat Information Center Group Training Center in Norfolk, Virginia; the Anti-Submarine Warfare Unit in Norfolk; the Fleet Sonar School in Key West, Florida, and the Minecraft Training Center at Little Creek, Virginia. In all, he directed the training of more than a million officers and men and supervised the shakedown or refresher training of about 5,000 ships and craft. He received the Distinguished Service Medal in February 1945 for this service.

On 1 October 1944, Beary took command of Service Squadron 6, a revolutionary new mobile underway replenishment element of the Service Force, United States Pacific Fleet, dedicated to support of the U.S. Third and Fifth Fleets in the Pacific. He proved particularly gifted in maintaining logistic support to the fleet despite the vast distances involved in the Pacific Theater and the complex and demanding task of keeping the fleets' combat forces supplied while underway for their frequent operations, including during the Battles of Iwo Jima and Okinawa. His achievements in Service Squadron 6 were recognized by two awards of the Legion of Merit, both in 1945, for exceptional and meritorious conduct.

During the ceremony in which Japan surrendered to the Allies on board the battleship USS Missouri (BB-63) on 2 September 1945 to end World War II, Beary served as a dignitary on the staff of United States Army General of the Army Douglas MacArthur.

=== Post-World War II ===
After World War II, Beary held various commands, serving as administrator of the U.S. Naval Shipping Control Authority; commandant of the 12th Naval District in 1946; commander of Naval Base San Francisco; commander of Western Sea Frontier; and commander of Pacific Reserve Fleet.

On 1 November 1948, having reached the rank of vice admiral, Beary returned to the Naval War College as its president. During his presidency, he sought to broaden the views of students by bringing business authorities and leaders to meet with them in roundtable discussions, laying the groundwork for the college's Global Strategy Discussions of the 1950s and Current Strategy Forum of today.

Beary remained the war college's president until 28 May 1950. He retired from the navy on 1 October 1950.

== Personal life ==
Beary was married to Alice L. Beary. They had one daughter, Alice B. Beary Meschter (1920–2006).

Beary was a decorated marksman and a member of the Navy Gun Club.

== Death ==
Beary died on 7 March 1966 at the U.S. Naval Hospital in San Diego, California. He was interred alongside his wife at the United States Naval Academy Cemetery and Columbarium with full military honors.

== Namesake ==
The U.S. Navy destroyer escort (later frigate) USS Donald B. Beary (DE-1085) (later FF-1085), in commission from 1972 to 1994, was named in Beary's honor.

== Awards ==
- Navy Cross
- Distinguished Service Medal
- Legion of Merit (two awards, one with Combat "V")
- Bronze Star Medal
- World War I Victory Medal
- Second Nicaraguan Campaign Medal
- Yangtze Service Medal
- American Defense Service Medal (with Atlantic Device)
- American Campaign Medal
- European–African–Middle Eastern Campaign Medal
- Asiatic–Pacific Campaign Medal
- World War II Victory Medal
- Distinguished Marksmanship and Pistol Shot Ribbon

== Notes ==
Military offices
Preceded by Raymond A. Spruance	President of the Naval War College; 1948–1950	Succeeded by Richard L. Conolly
