= Summoner (Wicca) =

Position in a Wiccan coven

A summoner, sometimes called a fetch, tanist, or tyler is the holder of a position in many traditional Wiccan covens. The primary, or at least most evident, function of the summoner is to call other coven members to a meeting or ritual. The summoner is also responsible for all inter-coven communication, and traditionally is the only member of a coven who will know where other covens reside. In many covens, the summoner is always male, and is considered the masculine equivalent of the maiden.

Historically, the summoner was the person who would let members know about covens, and who would find new members in the community.
