= The Summons (hymn) =

1987 Christian hymn by John L. Bell

- by John L. Bell
- Genre: Hymn
- Written: 1987
- Based on: Mark 1:16-20
- Meter: 8.8.4.4.8.8 with refrain
- Melody: "Kelvingrove"

"The Summons", also called "Will You Come and Follow Me", is a Scottish Christian hymn. It was written by John L. Bell in 1987.

== History ==
Bell composed "The Summons" after being accepted into the Iona Community in 1980. It was first included in the Iona Community's Heaven Shall Not Wait: Songs of Creation, the Incarnation, and the Life of Jesus, published by their Wild Goose Resource Group in 1987. "The Summons" has been published in many hymn books beyond the Iona Community and the United Kingdom, including those by the United Church of Canada and the Presbyterian Church (U.S.A.). It also appears in “Wonder, Love, and Praise,” the addendum hymnal of the Episcopal Church (United States) and "The Faith We Sing", a supplemental hymnal of the United Methodist Church.

== Composition and usage ==
"The Summons" is set to the tune of Kelvingrove, a traditional Scottish melody. Its text contains thirteen questions asked by Jesus in the first person. The initial four stanzas with the questions are in Jesus' voice, and the fifth stanza is the singer's response to them. The hymn is based on Mark 1:16–20 and alludes to Jesus calling his disciples to follow him. C. Michael Hawn calls it a prophetic Christian hymn and mentioned that it contains words uncommon to other hymns. It has been used as an example of how a Christian should react to fear and love as well as being written as an example of covenantal discipleship. The hymn is used as a vocational and youth hymn because the words are easier to learn for younger people compared with other hymns. In 2014, the hymn was used at Blackburn Cathedral at a service performed by the Bishop of Blackburn to commemorate 20 years since the first ordination of women in the Church of England as well as the Diocese of Blackburn's decision to support the ordination of women as bishops in the Church of England.
