= The Summoning (album) =

Studio album by Glamour of the Kill
- Released: 24 January 2011
- Recorded: 2010
- Genre: Metalcore
- Label: Afflicted Music, Ferret Music, Siege of Amida Records

Glamour of the Kill chronology
Glamour of the Kill (2008)	The Summoning (2011)	Savages (2013)

Singles from The Summoning
- 1. "Feeling Alive" Released: 14 November 2010; 2. "Supremacy"; 3. "If Only She Knew"

The Summoning is the debut album by the rock band Glamour of the Kill, released on 24 January 2011. The album was released via Afflicted Music.

On 13 November 2010, the band launched the video for "Feeling Alive", and soon after this video was launched on Kerrang! as "Video of the Week".

The UK magazine Metal Hammer, scored the album 7/10.

== Track listing ==
No.	Title	Length
1.	"If Only She Knew"	4:27
2.	"World's End"	4:33
3.	"Feeling Alive"	3:28
4.	"Dying from the Inside"	4:41
5.	"Lost Souls"	3:56
6.	"Malevolent Reign"	1:53
7.	"Supremacy"	4:02
8.	"Here, Behind These Walls"	5:32
9.	"Through the Eyes of the Broken"	4:31
10.	"Army of the Dead"	4:06
11.	"The Summoning"	5:47
12.	"The Voices (Bonus Track for Japan)"	4:59

iTunes pre-order edition bonus track
No.	Title	Length
12.	"All I Have to Give"	4:18

== Critical reception ==
The Summoning was generally well received by critics. Rob Kimber, writing for Punktastic, claimed that there were some "real gems" on the album, adding, "The Summoning offers a polished metal record that boasts both strong musicianship & a barrage of painfully catchy vocal hooks." Despite feeling that "there are a couple of songs that blur into the background", he praised the work of the band. Another reviewer, Pete Withers of Rock Sound, gave the album 7 out of 10, commenting: "...the band’s only formula here seems to be that if it sounds good, it’s going on."

== Personnel ==
- Davey Richmond – lead vocals, bass guitar
- Mike Kingswood – guitars, backing vocals
- Ben Thomson – drums, backing vocals
- Chris Gomerson – guitars, backing vocals
