= Sumner Township =

Sumner Township may refer to:

== Illinois ==
- Sumner Township, Kankakee County, Illinois
- Sumner Township, Warren County, Illinois

== Iowa ==
- Sumner Township, Buchanan County, Iowa
- Sumner Township, Iowa County, Iowa
- Sumner Township, Webster County, Iowa
- Sumner Township, Winneshiek County, Iowa

== Kansas ==
- Sumner Township, Osborne County, Kansas, in Osborne County, Kansas
- Sumner Township, Phillips County, Kansas, in Phillips County, Kansas
- Sumner Township, Reno County, Kansas, in Reno County, Kansas
- Sumner Township, Sumner County, Kansas, in Sumner County, Kansas

== Michigan ==
- Sumner Township, Michigan

== Minnesota ==
- Sumner Township, Fillmore County, Minnesota

== North Carolina ==
- Sumner Township, Guilford County, North Carolina, in Guilford County, North Carolina

== Oklahoma ==
- Sumner Township, Garfield County, Oklahoma, in Garfield County, Oklahoma

== South Dakota ==
- Sumner Township, Spink County, South Dakota, in Spink County, South Dakota

== See also ==
- Sumner (disambiguation)
