= Sumner High School =

Sumner High School may refer to:

- Sumner High School (Riverview, Florida)
- Sumner High School and auditorium, Sumner, Georgia
- Sumner High School (Iowa), Sumner, Iowa
- Sumner Academy of Arts & Science, Kansas City, Kansas
- Sumner High School (Louisiana), administered by the Tangipahoa Parish School Board
- Sumner High School (St. Louis), Missouri
- Sumner High School (Washington), Sumner, Washington
- Charles Sumner School, Washington, D.C.

== See also ==
- Sumner Schools (disambiguation)
