= Lord Sumner =

Lord Sumner can refer to:

- John Hamilton, 1st Viscount Sumner (1859–1934), a British lawyer and judge
- Lord Sumner, a character in Grey Griffins, a series of children's books by Derek Benz and J. S. Lewis
