= Sumner Hill =

Sumner Hill may refer to:

- Sumner Hill, California
- Sumner Hill Historic District, in Boston, Massachusetts
