= Sumner (given name) =

Sumner is a given name. Notable people with the name include:

- Sumner Archibald Cunningham (1843–1913), American Confederate veteran and newspaper editor.
- Sumner Gerard (1916–2005), American businessman and diplomat, US Ambassador to Jamaica
- Sumner McKnight (born 1946), American racing driver
- Sumner Paine, 1896 Olympic shooting gold and silver medalist
- Sumner Chilton Powell (1924–1993) , winner of the Pulitzer Prize for History in 1964
- Sumner Redstone (or Sumner Murray Rothstein, 1923–2020), Chairman of Viacom
- Sumner Stone, (born 1945), typeface designer
- Sumner L. Trussell (1860–1931), judge of the United States Board of Tax Appeals
- Sumner Welles, (1892–1961), U. S. Undersecretary of State
