= Thomas Hubbard Sumner =

American sea captain

Thomas Hubbard Sumner (20 March 1807 – 9 March 1876) was a sea captain during the 19th century. He is best known for developing the celestial navigation method known as the Sumner line or circle of equal altitude.

== Biography ==
Thomas Hubbard Sumner was born in Boston, Massachusetts, on March 20, 1807, the son of Thomas Waldron Sumner, an architect, and Elizabeth, daughter of Thomas Hubbard, of Weston Massachusetts. Sumner was one of eleven children, four of whom died young. Of the seven that survived he was the only son.

He entered Harvard University at age fifteen, graduating in 1826. Shortly after graduating, he married and ran off to New York with a woman with whom he had become entangled but the marriage was short-lived and they were divorced three years later. He then enrolled as a common sailor on a ship engaged in the China trade and within eight years he had risen to the rank of captain and was master of his own ship. On March 10, 1834 he married Selina Christiana Malcolm, of Connecticut and between 1835 and 1848 together they had six children, two of whom died in their infancy.

On November 25, 1837, Sumner sailed from Charleston, South Carolina, bound for Greenock, Scotland, and it was during that voyage, while entering Saint George's Channel and the Irish Sea, that he discovered the principle upon which his new method of navigation was based. He took some years to perfect it and published it as book in 1843.

Shortly after that his mind began to fail and in 1850 he was committed to the McLean Asylum in Boston. His state gradually deteriorated and in 1865 he was committed to the Lunatic Hospital at Taunton, Massachusetts, where he died in 1876 at the age of 69.

== Discovery ==
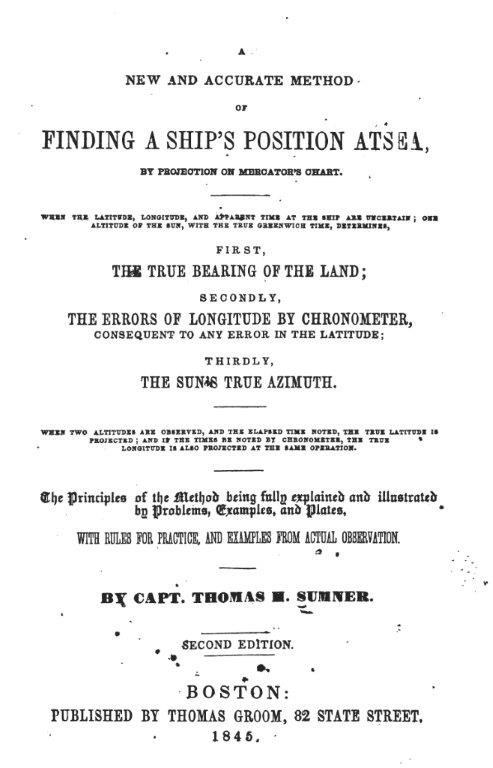
A New and Accurate Method of Finding a Ship's Position at Sea, by Projection on Mercator's Chart, by Capt. Thomas H. Sumner, 2nd. Ed. 1845

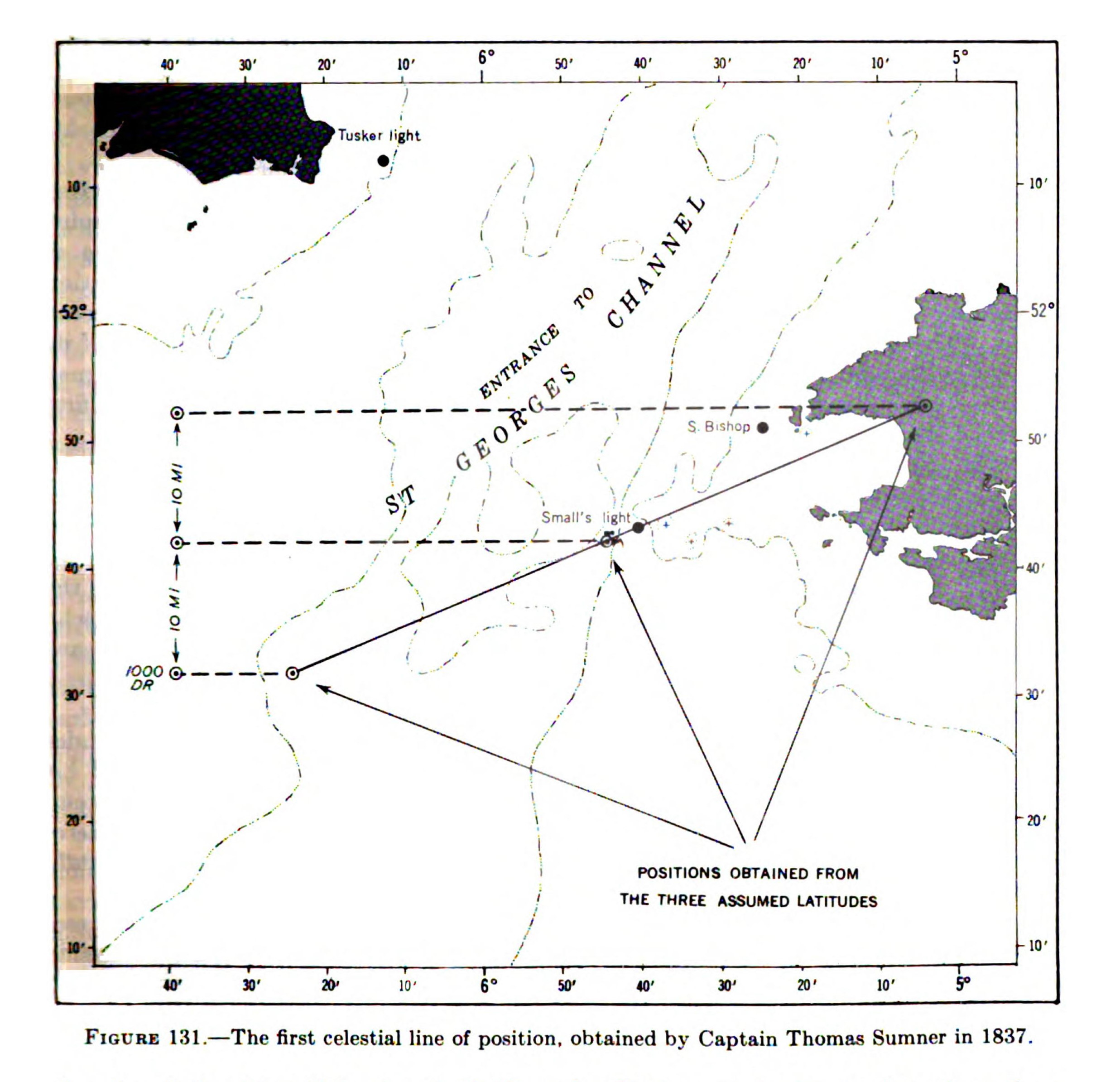
Plot of Sumner's calculated positions in 1837

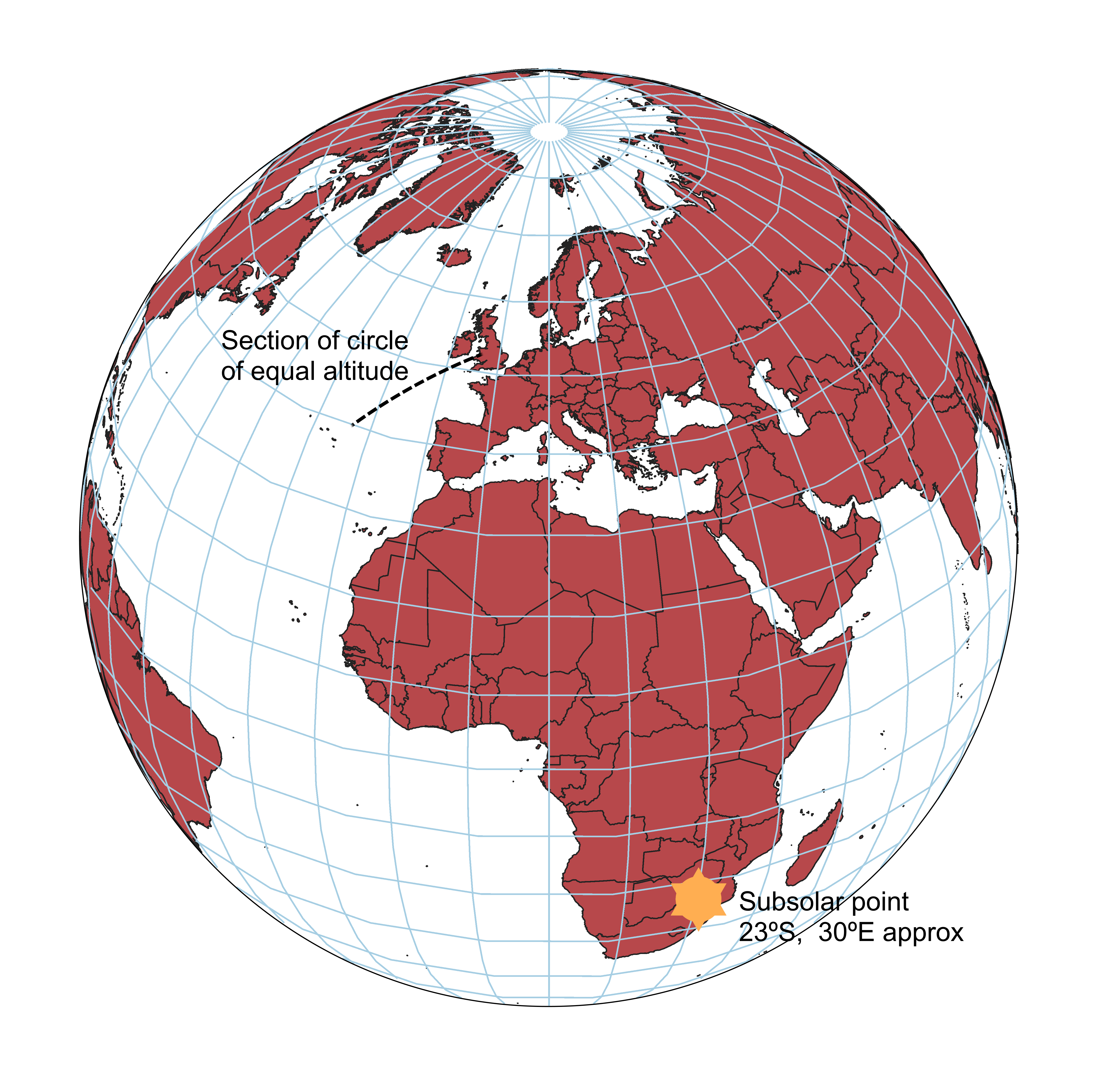
Orthographic projection showing approximate position of the subsolar point and part of the circle of equal altitude at 10 am GMT 17 December 1837

He discovered the (later so-called) line of position or circle of equal altitude, which he named "parallel of equal altitude" on a voyage from South Carolina to Greenock in Scotland in 1837. On December 17, 1837, as he was nearing the coast of Wales, he was uncertain of his position after several days of cloudy weather and no sights. A momentary opening in the clouds allowed him to take a sight of the sun which he reduced with his estimated latitude. Measuring the longitude depended on knowing the time, from his chronometer, and the latitude accurately. Being uncertain about the latitude he reduced the sight again using 10' greater and 20' greater latitude, plotted the longitude for each one, and he observed that all three resulting positions were located on a line which also happened to pass through Smalls Lighthouse (off the coast of Pembrokeshire in Wales). He reasoned that he must be located somewhere on that line and that if he set course E.N.E. along the line he should eventually sight the Smalls Light which, in fact he did, in less than an hour. He realized that a single observation of the altitude of a celestial body at a known time determines the position of a line somewhere on which the observer is located. The line of equal altitude is actually a circle, centered on the point on the globe at which the sun (in the case of a solar observation) is directly overhead, the subsolar point. As the circle has a radius of thousands of miles, a segment a few tens of miles long closely approximates a straight line. Sumner published his findings six years later in 1843 and this method of resolving a sight for two different latitudes and drawing a "line of position" through the two positions obtained was an important development in celestial navigation. The method was quickly recognized as important and a copy of the pamphlet describing the method was supplied to every ship in the United States Navy.

== Namesakes ==
The crater Sumner, and the nearby crater chain Catena Sumner, on the far side of the Moon, are named after him.

Two survey ships of the United States Navy (USN), the USS Sumner (AGS-5) and USNS Sumner (T-AGS-61), were named in honour of Sumner. Note that two other Sumner's of the USN, the USS Sumner (DD-333) and the USS Allen M. Sumner (DD-692), were named for United States Marine Corps Captain Allen Melancthon Sumner, who died in action in World War I.
