= USNS Sumner =

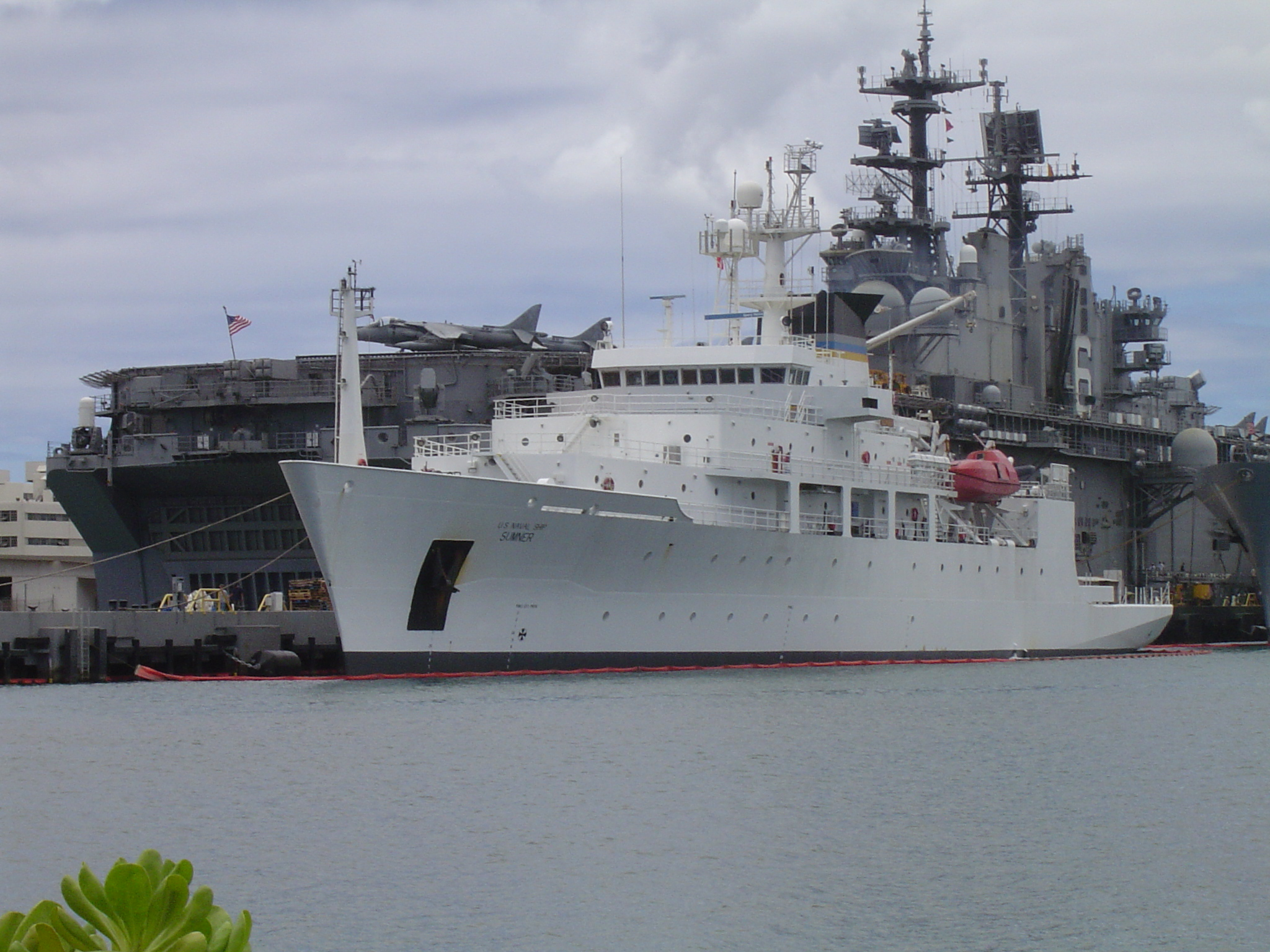
- USNS Sumner (T-AGS-61) in Pearl Harbor, Hawaii July, 2003 with USS Bonhomme Richard in the background.

History

United States
- Name: Sumner
- Namesake: Thomas Hubbard Sumner
- Owner: United States Navy
- Operator: Military Sealift Command
- Awarded: 30 January 1991
- Builder: Halter Marine
- Laid down: 18 November 1992
- Launched: 19 May 1994
- In service: 30 May 1995
- Stricken: 29 August 2014
- Identification: IMO number: 9075204; MMSI number: 303872000; Callsign: NZAU
- Status: Awaiting disposal

General characteristics
- Class & type: Pathfinder-class survey ship
- Tonnage: 4,260 IGT (Gross Tonnage)
- Displacement: 4,762 long tons
- Length: 328 ft 6 in (100.13 m)
- Beam: 58 ft (18 m)
- Draft: 19 ft (5.8 m)
- Speed: 16 kn (30 km/h)
- Complement: 26 mariners/27 sponsor personnel

USNS Sumner (T-AGS-61) is a Pathfinder-class oceanographic survey ship that became operational in 1997. It is the fourth United States Navy ship named Sumner, in this case for Thomas Hubbard Sumner, an American sea captain who discovered the principles of celestial navigation by circle of equal altitude. These ships are crewed by a small crew of civilian mariners, supporting an even smaller contingent of United States Navy personnel.

According to Carol Rosenberg, writing in the Miami Herald, the vessel was scheduled to be placed out of service in 2014. Rosenberg reported speculation that Summer would be transferred to the United States Coast Guard. The Coast Guard would use the ship to counter smugglers in the Caribbean Sea, where she would be stationed as a permanent helicopter station. Coast Guard sharpshooters could be quickly dispatched to intercept and apprehend smugglers. Retrofitting the ship with facilities to operate and maintain a helicopter would cost $10 million.

According to the Naval Vessel Registry, Sumner was stricken on 29 August 2014 with a disposition of Transfer. MARAD NDRF document lists her at the Beaumont Reserve Fleet, Beaumont, Texas in December 2014, with note scheduled for disposal.
