= USS Sumner (AGS-5) =

Tender of the United States Navy

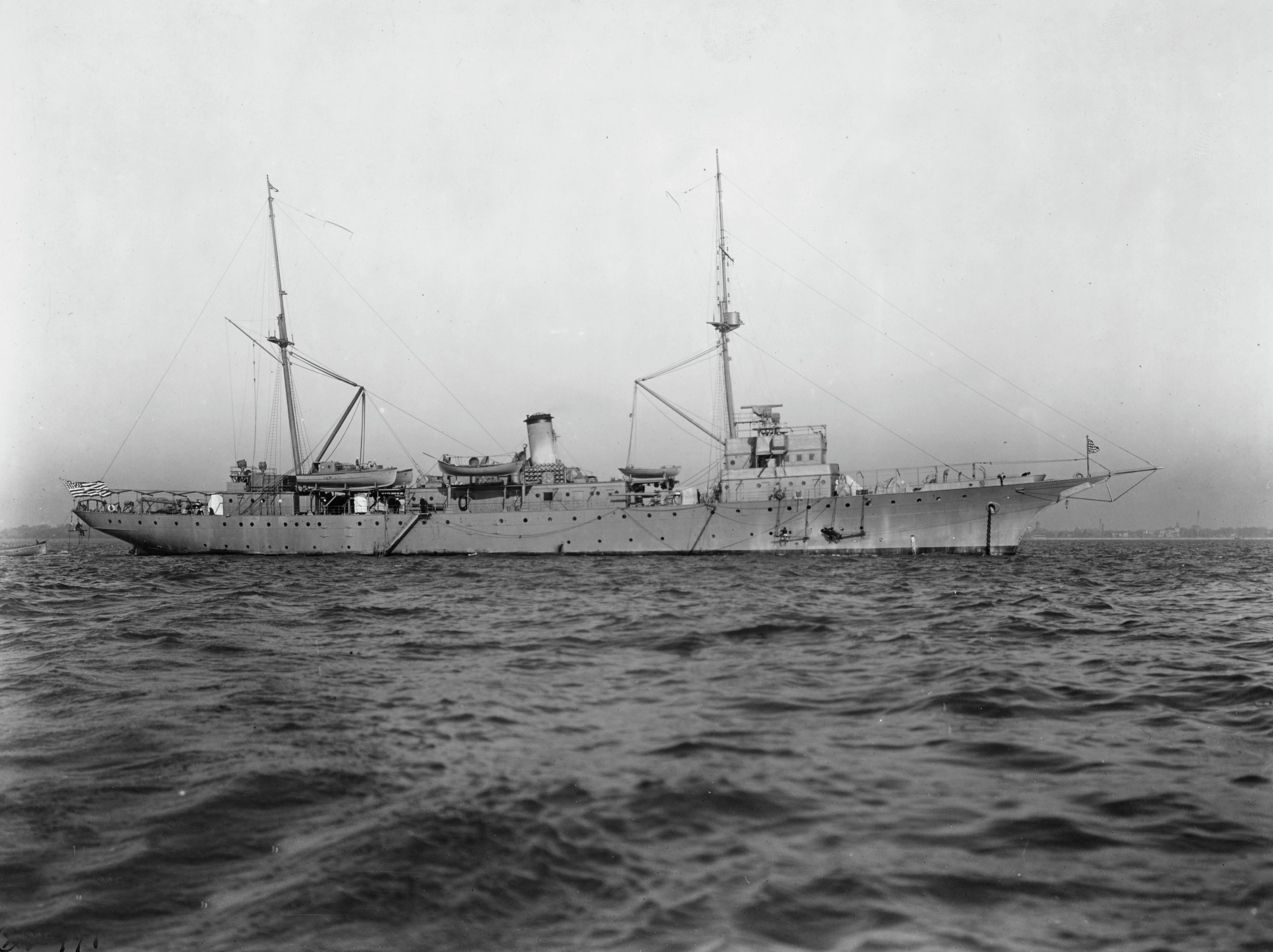

History

United States
- Name: USS Sumner
- Builder: Seattle Construction and Dry Dock Company, Seattle, Washington
- Launched: 9 February 1915
- Commissioned: 24 November 1915 as USS Bushnell (AS-2)
- Decommissioned: 13 September 1946
- Renamed: Sumner, 23 August 1940
- Reclassified: AG-32 (Miscellaneous Auxiliary), 25 July 1940; AGS-5 (Survey Ship), 1 December 1943
- Stricken: 19 September 1946
- Honours and awards: 3 battle stars (WWII)
- Fate: Scrapped 1947

General characteristics
- Type: Survey ship
- Displacement: 3,142 long tons (3,192 t)
- Length: 350 ft 6 in (106.83 m)
- Beam: 45 ft 8 in (13.92 m)
- Draft: 19 ft 6 in (5.94 m)
- Speed: 14 knots (26 km/h; 16 mph)
- Complement: 151 officers and enlisted
- Armament: 4 × 5 in (130 mm) guns; 3 × 21 in (533 mm) torpedo tubes

USS Sumner (AG-32/AGS-5) was a survey ship in the United States Navy. She was named in honor of Thomas Sumner. She was originally commissioned as a submarine tender as USS Bushnell (AS-2/AG-32), in honor of David Bushnell, the inventor of the first American submarine.

== USS Bushnell ==
Bushnell was launched on 9 February 1915 by the Seattle Construction and Dry Dock Company in Seattle, Washington, sponsored by Miss Esculine Warwick Bushnell, great-grandniece of David Bushnell. The vessel was commissioned on 24 November 1915.

She was assigned to the Submarine Flotilla, Atlantic Fleet, as tender to L-class submarines in January 1916 and arrived on the east coast in February. Early in 1917 she escorted submarines to the Azores and in December accompanied Submarine Division 5 to Ireland, arriving at Queenstown on 27 January 1918. Bushnell acted as tender for submarines operating off Queenstown until the end of World War I. She later escorted captured German submarines to Scotland, Canada, and the United States.

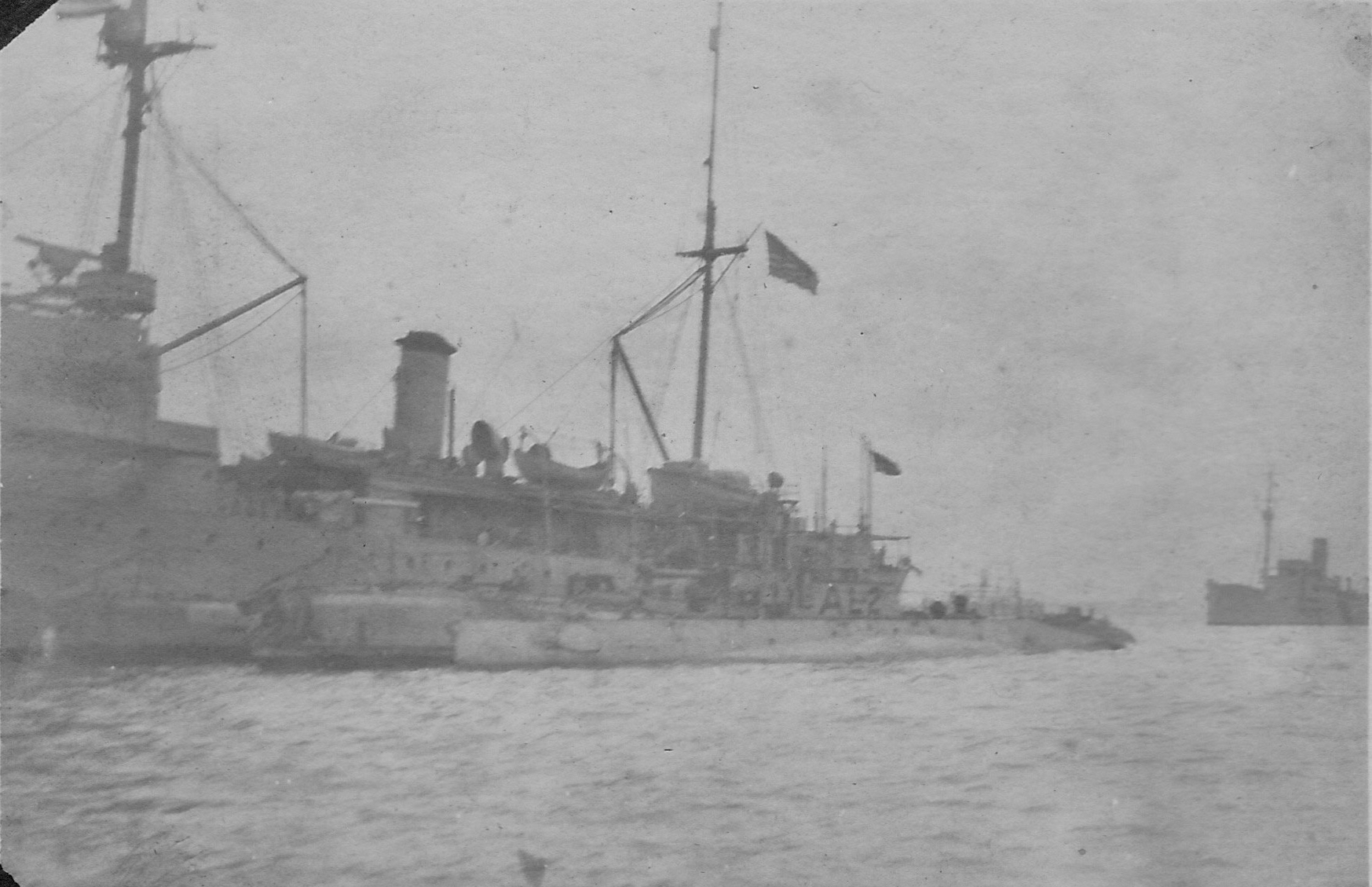
Bushnell with German submarine alongside, somewhere in the UK in 1918

In September 1920 she assisted in salvage operations of the submarine USS S-5 that had sunk off the Delaware Capes. Up until August 1931, Bushnell cruised with various submarine divisions on the Atlantic coast, in the Caribbean, on the west coast, and in the Hawaiian Islands. Bushnell arrived at San Diego on 3 September 1931 and reported for duty with the Submarine Force, Pacific Fleet, with whom she operated until 1937. She towed the sailing frigate USS Constitution from San Diego to the Panama Canal Zone during March and April 1934 and in February 1935 assisted in the search for survivors of the dirigible USS Macon which crashed off San Diego.

In December 1937 she was transferred to duty with the hydrographic survey and carried out her operations on the coasts of Colombia, Venezuela, Trinidad, British Guiana, and Samoa until September 1941.

== USS Sumner ==
On 25 July 1940 the ship's designation was changed to AG-32 and on 23 August she was renamed Sumner. Sumner sailed from Norfolk, Virginia on 20 October 1941; joined the Base Force, Pacific Fleet, at San Diego, and arrived 25 November at the Submarine Base, Pearl Harbor.

On 7 December 1941 Sumner was moored at the Submarine Base, Pearl Harbor, and took an active part in the defense of the Islands against the Japanese attack. After the attack she assisted the stricken ships in the area. On 12 January 1942 she set sail for Tongatapu and thence to Nandi Island and Samoa for surveying. After transporting Marines to Wallis Island in May, she made a survey of local harbors. During the ensuing months she conducted surveys at Noumea, New Caledonia; Nukuʻalofa, Tonga; Port Vila and Espiritu Santo, New Hebrides; and Tulagi, Solomon Islands.

Sumner weighed anchor for Sydney, Australia, 28 January 1943. In March she sailed to the Deboyne Islands to make a survey. She subsequently surveyed Stanley, Pitts, and Milne Bays in New Guinea. On 5 August she commenced a survey of Nukufetau, Ellice Islands. These operations were hampered throughout August and September by enemy air attacks. On 1 December 1943 her classification was changed to AGS-5.

Between 5 December 1943 and 13 February 1944 Sumner participated in the occupation of Tarawa and conducted a survey of the newly acquired area. She sailed to Kwajalein in February 1944 where she was engaged in improving the harbor facilities until 11 April. The ship then stood out for San Francisco, via Pearl Harbor, arriving 7 May. Repairs completed, Sumner returned to the Hawaiian Islands in August. In September she steamed to Ulithi where until February 1945 she conducted survey operations. On 1 February she sailed for Guam where she remained until 27 February. On 4 March she arrived at Iwo Jima and commenced surveying operations under very adverse conditions. On 8 March she was hit by an enemy shell which killed one of her crew and injured three others. The shell failed to explode and material damage was light. Sumner continued surveying the area until 3 May when she departed for Guam. She remained at Guam until 17 June when she sailed to Leyte Gulf, Philippine Islands.

Survey operations in the Philippines were completed 28 August and Sumner stood out for Jinsen, Korea, arriving 9 September 1945. She continued her survey operations in the Korea-China area until sailing for Pearl Harbor 19 December 1945.

Sumner underwent a yard period at Pearl Harbor and then sailed to Bikini Atoll to conduct surveys in preparation for the coming atomic bomb tests before returning to California 24 May 1946. On 9 July she departed the west coast and proceeded to Norfolk where she reported for inactivation. She was decommissioned 13 September 1946 and transferred to the United States Maritime Commission six days later.

Sumner received three battle stars for her World War II service.

== Awards ==
- World War I Victory Medal
- American Defense Service Medal with "FLEET" clasp
- Asiatic-Pacific Campaign Medal with three battle stars
- World War II Victory Medal
- Navy Occupation Medal
- China Service Medal

== Sources ==
- The Journal of the American Society of Naval Engineers published a 20-page article in the August 1916 issue.
