= USS Sumner (DD-333) =

Clemson-class destroyer

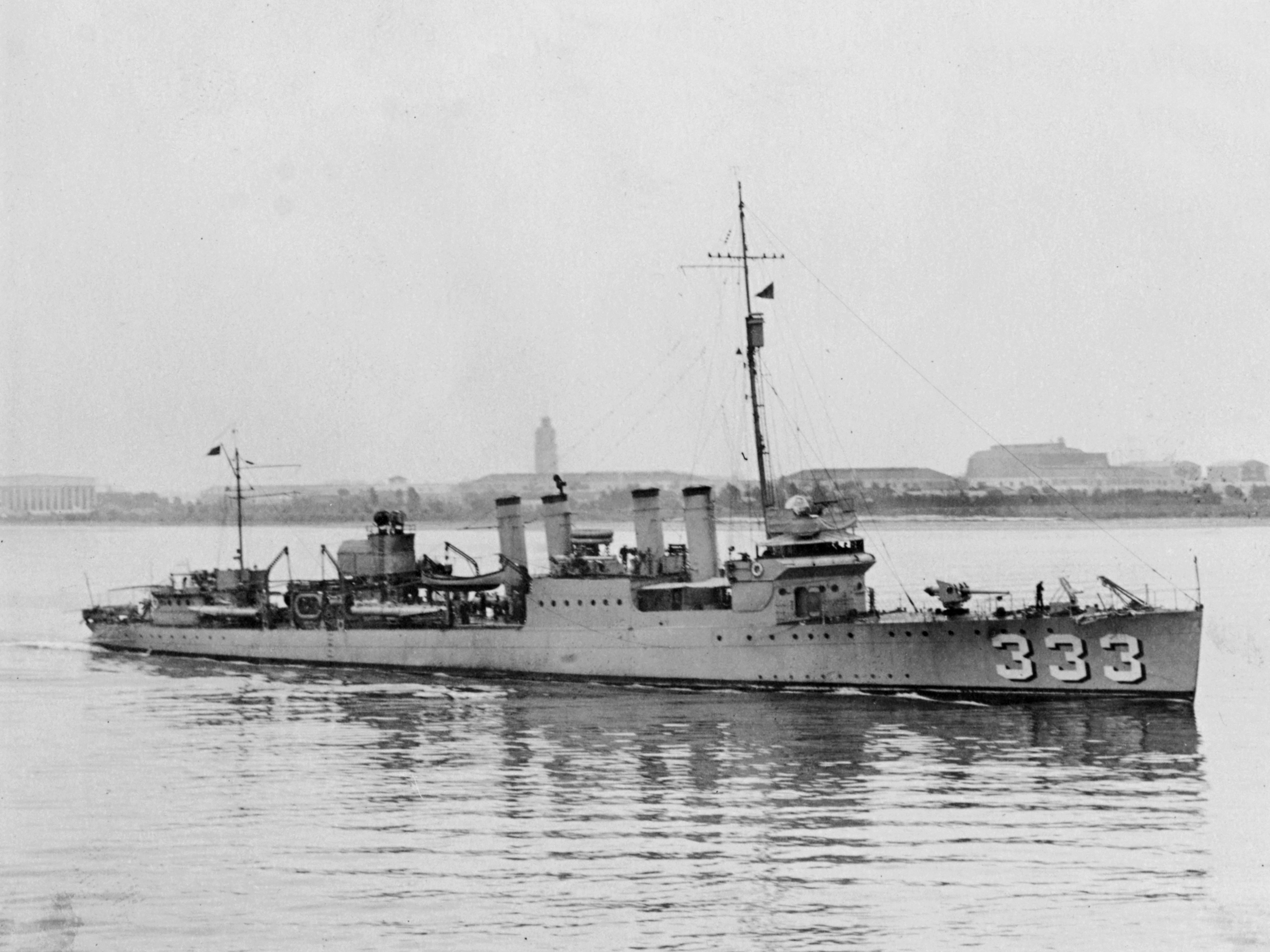

History

United States
- Namesake: Allen M. Sumner
- Builder: Bethlehem Shipbuilding Corporation, Union Iron Works, San Francisco
- Laid down: 27 August 1919
- Launched: 27 November 1920
- Commissioned: 27 May 1921
- Decommissioned: 29 March 1930
- Stricken: 18 November 1930
- Fate: Sold for scrap, 12 June 1934

General characteristics
- Class & type: Clemson-class destroyer
- Displacement: 1,215 tons
- Length: 314 feet 4 inches (95.81 m)
- Beam: 31 feet 8 inches (9.65 m)
- Draft: 9 feet 10 inches (3.00 m)
- Propulsion: 26,500 shp (20 MW); geared turbines, 2 screws
- Speed: 35 knots (65 km/h)
- Range: 4,900 nmi (9,100 km); @ 15 kt
- Complement: 130 officers and enlisted
- Armament: 4 × 4 in (102 mm)/50 guns, 1 × 3 in (76 mm)/25 gun, 12 × 21 inch (533 mm) torpedo tubes

The first USS Sumner (DD-333) was a Clemson-class destroyer in service with the United States Navy from 1921 to 1930. She was scrapped in 1934.

== History ==
Sumner was named for Allen M. Sumner. She was laid down at San Francisco, California, on 27 August 1919 by the Bethlehem Shipbuilding Corporation; launched on 27 November 1920; sponsored by Miss Margaret Sumner; and commissioned on 27 May 1921, Lieutenant Commander Donald B. Beary in command.

Four days later, Sumner joined Destroyer Division 49, Squadron 13, Flotilla 2 of the Pacific Fleet. Her naval career lasted almost nine years and occurred during a period of relative naval calm. On only four occasions did she depart from her routine of training, maneuvers, and patrols. The first such break came in 1924, when the revolution against the Obregón government in Mexico rose to such intensity that the lives and property of Americans in the country were endangered. Accordingly, on 17 January, while Richmond was dispatched to Tampico, Sumner and five other destroyers joined Omaha in sailing to Veracruz to protect the resident Americans.

Sumner resumed her normal west coast operations in early April 1924 and was so employed until mid-1925. On 1 July 1925, she joined the Battle Fleet and a division of light cruisers from the Scouting Force in departing Pearl Harbor for a cruise to Australia and New Zealand. The force visited Pago Pago, Samoa, then continued on to Melbourne and Sydney, Australia, and to Auckland, Lyttelton, Wellington, and Dunedin, New Zealand. The fleet returned to the west coast on 26 September, and Sumner resumed training duties and patrols.

In March 1927, she transited the Panama Canal to participate in maneuvers in the Atlantic Ocean. During that cruise and the maneuvers, she made it as far north as Boston, Massachusetts, before returning to the Pacific Ocean in June 1927. After a voyage to Hawaii and operations in that area, conducted in 1928, Sumner returned to her activities along the west coast until the spring of 1930.

== Fate ==
On 29 March 1930, she was decommissioned at San Diego, California, and her name was struck from the Navy list on 18 November. Between then and 1934, she continued to serve the Navy - first as a barracks ship for submarine crews; then as a test ship for structural strength tests. Finally, on 12 June 1934, her hulk was sold in accordance with the terms of the London Treaty for the Limitation and Reduction of Naval Armaments.
