= List of Delta Sigma Theta members =

Delta Sigma Theta is an international historically Black sorority. It was founded on January 13, 1913, at Howard University and was incorporated in Washington, D.C., on February 9, 1913. Below is a list of some of Delta Sigma Theta's notable members

== Founders ==
Name	Original chapter	Notability	Ref.
Osceola Macarthy Adams	Alpha	Founder; born in Albany, Georgia. Within the ranks of Delta, Adams called upon her prior leadership experience to aid in the founding of Delta Sigma Theta Sorority, Inc. In Chicago, Illinois, she was installed as the first president of Lambda, and she served as the grand treasurer of the national organization. She directed the debut of actors Harry Belafonte and Sidney Poitier.	
Pauline Oberdorfer Minor	Alpha	Founder; born in Charlottesville, Virginia; an excellent musician. She was the Alpha Chapter's first Treasurer. In 1914, she graduated as valedictorian of the Teacher's College. She was also the President of the Teachers' Club. Minor taught school in Alabama, South Carolina, and Pennsylvania. She wrote the book Soul Echos, which featured 40 of her compositions. She also became a renowned mezzo-soprano recitalist.	
Zephyr Chisom Carter	Alpha	Founder; born in El Paso, Texas. During her years at Howard University, she played an active role in the collegiate chapter of the NAACP. In Delta, she became the Alpha Chapter's first reporter. She was a singer and actress, and for several years she sang for television shows.	
Edith Motte Young	Alpha	Founder; North Carolina native. She was the Alpha Chapter's first Recording Secretary. Upon graduation from Howard University, she moved to Youngstown, Ohio. Later, she taught at Claflin College in Orangeburg, South Carolina. She received her M.A. degree in Biblical Literature from Oberlin College in Ohio. She was also an accomplished pianist.	
Edna Brown Coleman	Alpha	Founder; Washington, D.C. native. Her father had a prestigious career at Howard University for 31 years as a professor of religion. Many of the first meetings of Delta Sigma Theta Sorority, Inc. were held in her living room. She was dedicated and studious, and graduated from Howard in 1913 as valedictorian and class president. Upon graduating from Howard, Brown wed Frank Coleman, the co-founder of Omega Psi Phi fraternity. She played a crucial role in the development of Delta Sigma Theta Sorority, Inc.	
Bertha Pitts Campbell	Alpha	Founder; born in Winfield, Kansas, but grew up in Colorado. She entered the Teaching College at Howard. On March 13, 1913, she participated in the March on Washington, Delta's first public act as a sorority. 68 years later, she repeated this walk on August 2, 1981. Even though a limo was provided for her, at the grand age of 92, she refused to ride and chose to walk. Campbell became an educator, and she spent the vast majority of her adulthood working in Seattle, Washington, toward better race relations.	
Frederica Chase Dodd	Alpha	Founder; born in Dallas, Texas. Her family had a substantial amount of financial and social authority. She was enrolled in the Teacher's College. After graduating from Howard University, she took on a brief career as a teacher. She became the first Sergeant at Arms of the Alpha Chapter. In 1926, she helped to create the graduate chapter of Delta in Dallas, which became the first Greek letter organization in the city	
Myra Davis Hemmings	Alpha	Founder; Gonzales, Texas native. Of all the founders of Delta Sigma Theta Sorority, Inc., she had the most assertive leadership skills. She went from being President of Alpha Kappa Alpha to being president of Delta Sigma Theta Sorority, Inc. In her daily life, she continued to be a role model through her involvement in the Alpha Phi Literary Society. She acted in Go Down Death: The Story of Jesus and the Devil.	
Ethel Cuff Black	Alpha	Founder; born in Wilmington, Delaware into a prosperous family. She enjoyed fine arts and expressed this through her involvement in the Howard University Choir. She was continuously involved with community organizations, such as the YWCA, where she became chairperson of the collegiate committee from 1911 to 1912. After graduating, she became a teacher in the New York City public school system. In 1953, she assisted in the creation of the Queens Alumnae Chapter.	
Winona Cargile Alexander	Alpha	Founder; born in Columbus, Georgia. Her unique personality allowed her to flourish in any environment and appeal to many people. Alexander valued education, and upon graduating, became a teacher. Always giving back to the community and her sorority, she became the first social worker for the New York City and County Charities, and she was the Alpha chapter's first Custodian.	
Marguerite Young Alexander	Alpha	Founder; charter member of Lambda chapter; born in Chicago, Illinois. While at Howard University, she concentrated her studies on two foreign languages. After graduation, she returned to Chicago, where she became a French and Spanish Correspondence Secretary. In 1950, as a member of the housing group, Alexander helped the Alpha Nu chapter purchase a sorority house on the campus of the University of Illinois	
Ethel Carr Watson	Alpha	Founder; Parkersburg, West Virginia native. During the March for Women's Suffrage, Watson's family told her not to march, but she was forced to defy the order as she was selected to hold the banner since she was the tallest. She pursued her teaching career for over 30 years. She then retired and began a second career as a dramatic performer.	
Florence Letcher Toms	Alpha	Founder; Washington, D.C. native. At graduation from Howard, her diploma and scholarship were given to her by William Howard Taft. She was chosen to present to Lady Eleanor Roosevelt before an audience. Toms collected elephants, which has become a hobby of Deltas all over the world.	
Jimmie Bugg Middleton	Alpha	Founder; active supporter of Delta from Lynchburg, Virginia. She helped lobby Delta Sigma Theta to participate in the March for Women's Suffrage. In 1936, she received her master's degree from Howard University. By 1938, after years of effort, she witnessed her Raleigh Alumnae chapter, Alpha Zeta Sigma, established in Raleigh, North Carolina. In 1944, she was appointed to the Scholarship Board of New York's 22nd Congressional District.	
Jessie McGuire Dent	Alpha	Founder; Galveston, Texas native. She was the first corresponding secretary of the Alpha Chapter. She enrolled in the Teacher's College at Howard University. She became a teacher in the Galveston School District. Dent took on the Galveston School District in court and won equal wages for Black teachers.	
Madree Penn White	Alpha	Founder; the driving force and inspiration behind Delta Sigma Theta. She is originally from Atchison, Kansas, but moved to Omaha, Nebraska. White drafted the constitution and set of bylaws. She selected the Greek letter symbols and created the initiation ritual. She was the first woman on the Howard University Journal's staff as an editor. She was the founder and President of the Triangle Press Company in St. Louis, Missouri.	
Wertie Blackwell Weaver	Alpha	Founder; Kansas City, Missouri native. After graduation, she was appointed to teach in East St. Louis. She published the novel The Valley of the Poor, which focused on racism and poverty in the South.	
Olive Jones	Alpha	Founder; Washington, D.C. native. She became a music teacher in the Washington public school system.	
Naomi Sewell Richardson	Alpha	Founder; Washingtonville, New York native. She was involved in extreme activism and civic service. She was appointed to the East St. Louis public school system after graduation by Dean Lewis B. Moore. She also taught in Illinois, Princeton, New Jersey, and New York City. Richardson was the last surviving founder when she died in 1993.	
Vashti Turley Murphy	Alpha	Founder; a Washington, D.C. native. She graduated from M Street High School, later known as Dunbar High School. This was the first public high school for Blacks in the United States. She then attended Miner Normal School, which had a historic association with Howard University and became part of the DC Public School System in 1879. In 1908, she was appointed to teach in Washington public schools. Murphy was an ardent supporter of the major political issues of the day, including voting rights for women.	
Eliza Pearl Shippen	Alpha	Founder; Washington, D.C. native. She graduated magna cum laude with a B.A. from the Howard College of Arts and Sciences. She received her M.A. from the Teachers College of Columbia University and her Ph.D. from the University of Pennsylvania. Dr. Shippen was the only founder to receive a Ph.D. and one of the only two founders who never married. She strongly believed in the public service of Delta.	

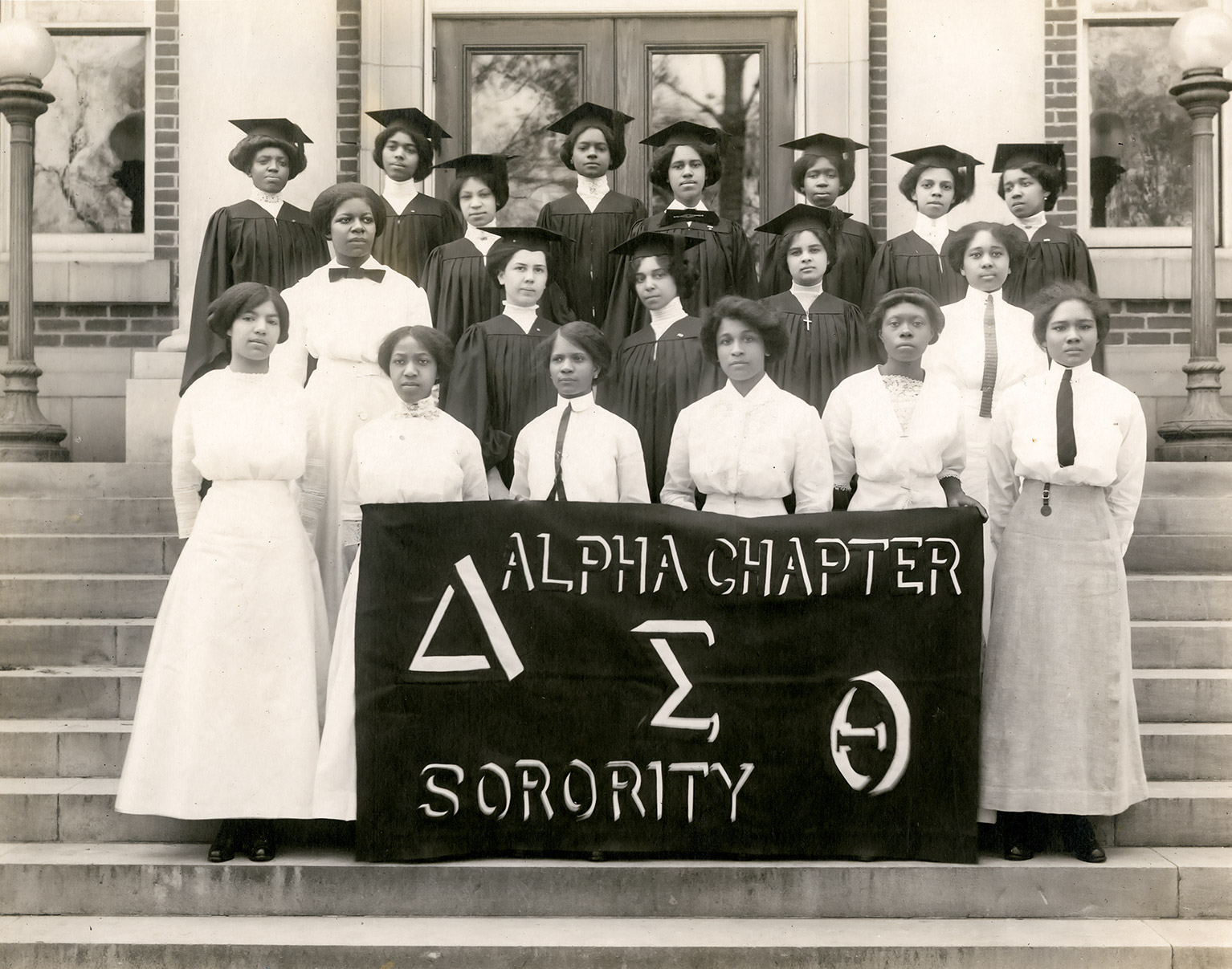
22 founders of Delta Sigma Theta

Osceola Macarthy Adams

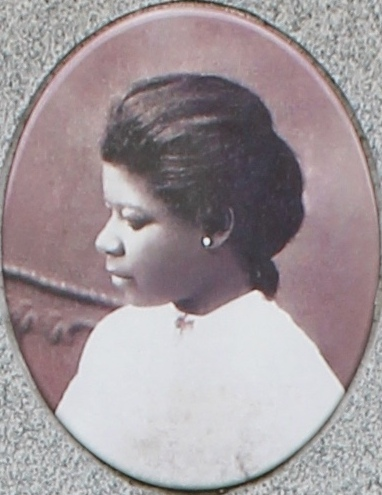
Pauline Oberdorfer Minor

== Arts ==
Name	Original chapter	Notability	Ref.
Gwendolyn Bennett	Rho	Artist, poet, prose writer, teacher; played an active role in the African American arts community in Harlem; former director of the Harlem Community Art Center of the N.Y.C. WPA Art Project; one of the most revered poets of the New Negro Era (Harlem Renaissance); poetry reflected themes of the New Negro Era – racial pride, rediscovery of Africa, a celebration of blackness	
Selma Burke	Honorary	Artist who designed the profile of President Franklin D. Roosevelt on the United States dime; sculptor of President Franklin D. Roosevelt portrait	
Elizabeth Catlett	Alpha	Sculptor and printmaker; Mother and Child	
Geneva Handy Southall	Beta Gamma	Musicologist and pianist	
Varnette Honeywood	Honorary	Painter known for her unique portrayals of Black culture in paintings exhibited in home settings of several popular television shows, including The Cosby Show	

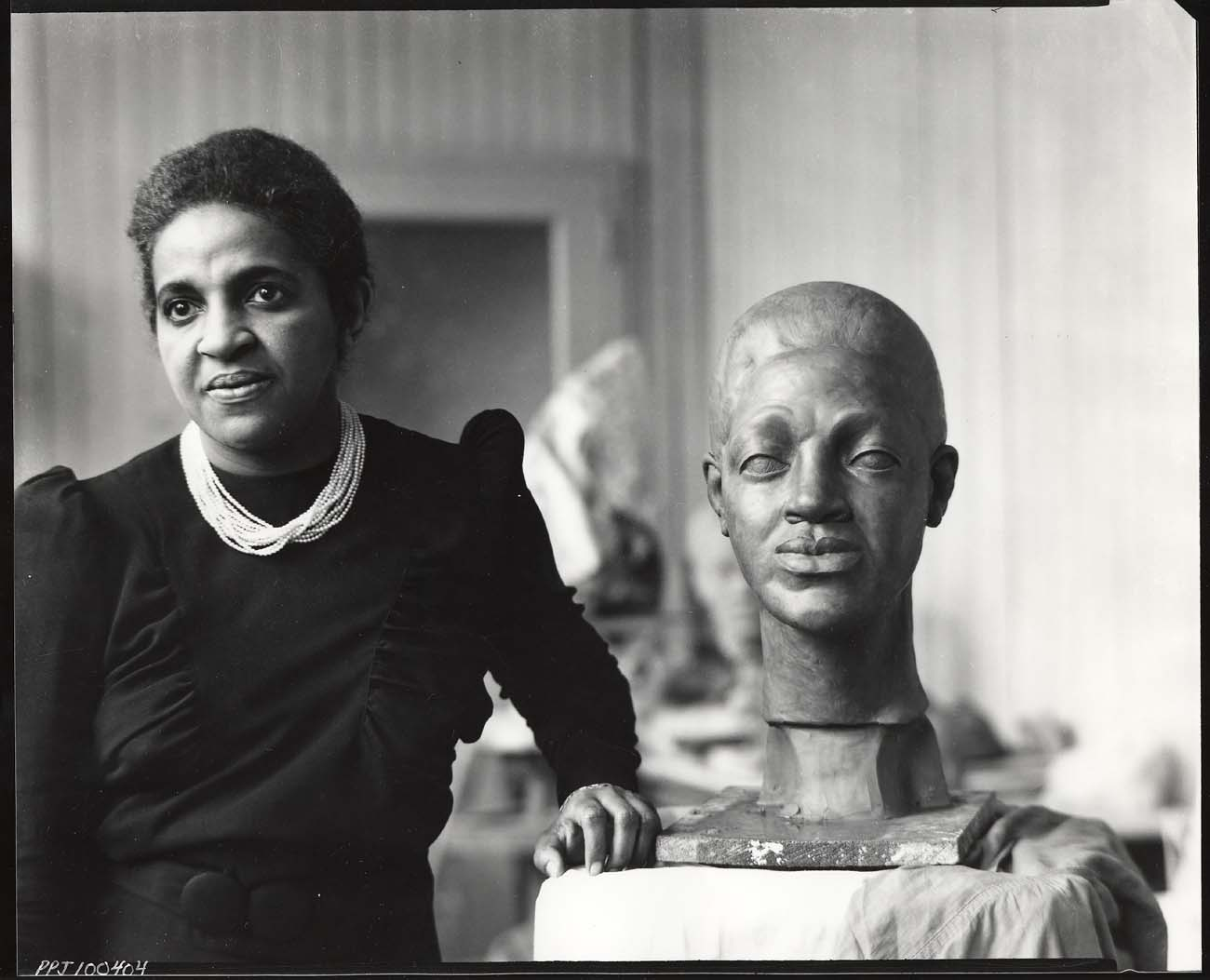
Selma Burke

== Business ==
Name	Original chapter	Notability	Ref.
Juanita Baranco	Unknown	Executive vice president and chief operating officer of Baranco Automotive Group (one of the first African American-owned car dealerships in the Atlanta area); former Assistant Attorney General of Georgia; first African American woman to chair the Georgia Board of Regents	
Ingrid Saunders Jones	Epsilon Epsilon	Director of the Coca-Cola Foundation	
Cora Masters Barry	Unknown	Founder of the Southeast Tennis and Learning Center; founder and CEO of the Recreation Wish List Committee (RWLC) of Washington, D.C.; former First Lady of Washington, D.C.	
Maya Rockeymoore Cummings	Eta Beta	President and CEO at Global Policy Solutions; former Chief of Staff/Administrative Assistant at Office of Congressman Charles Rangel; former professional staff at House Ways and Means Social Security Subcommittee	
Eunice W. Johnson	Alpha Zeta	Executive of Johnson Publishing Company; creator of the Ebony Fashion Show	
Paula Madison	Honorary	Business executive with Williams Group Holdings; former Executive Vice President and Chief Diversity Officer of NBC Universal; former Chairman and CEO of the Los Angeles Sparks; member of the WNBA Board of Governors; named among Black Enterprise magazine's "75 Most Powerful African Americans in Corporate America"	
Renetta McCann	Theta Alpha	CEO of the Americas Starcom MediaVest	
Elsie L. Scott	Unknown	President and CEO of the Congressional Black Caucus Foundation	
Jane E. Smith	Unknown	Former President and CEO of the National Council of Negro Women; founding member of the Women's Chamber of Commerce	

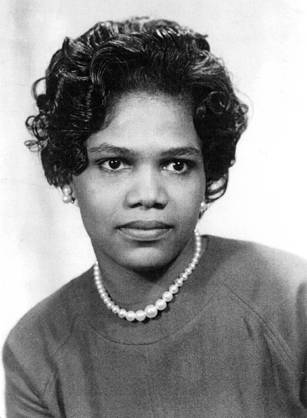
Edith Irby Jones

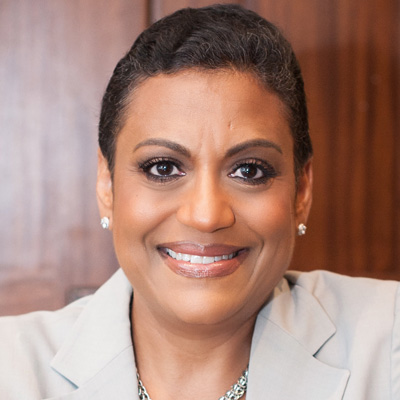
Stacey D. Stewart

== Civil rights ==
Name	Original chapter	Notability	Ref.
Daisy Bates	Honorary	Advisor to the Little Rock Nine to integrate Little Rock Central High School; civil rights activist	
Nannie Burroughs	Honorary	One of the founders of National Association of Colored Women; founder of the National Training School for Girls in Washington, DC; associate editor of the Christian Banner, a Philadelphia newspaper; civil rights activist	
Melanie L. Campbell	Sigma	Executive director of the National Coalition of Black Civic Participation; civic leader; civil rights activist who implemented VOTE Election Reform Task Force, Unity Civic Engagement & Voter Empowerment Campaign, and ReBuild Hope NOW; charter member of the Future PAC	
Coralie Franklin Cook	Honorary	One of the founders of the National Association of Colored Women; civil rights activist and suffragist	
Fannie Lou Hamer	Honorary	Voting rights activist and civil rights leader	
Dorothy Counts	Gamma Lambda	Civil rights activist and one of the first black students admitted to Harry P. Harding High School	
Myrlie Evers-Williams	Unknown	Wife of slain civil rights leader Medgar Evers; in 1995, the first woman to chair the NAACP; former NAACP chairwoman	
Sybrina Fulton	Miami Alumnae	Mother of Trayvon Martin; founding member of Mothers of the Movement; civil rights activist; author of Rest in Power: The Enduring Life of Trayvon Martin; co-founder of the Trayvon Martin Foundation	
LaDonna Harris	Honorary	Native American activist; founder of Americans for Indian Opportunity; first Native American woman to run for vice president of the United States; founding board member of the National Urban League and National Women's Political Caucus; currently serves on the boards of Think New Mexico and Advancement of Maori Opportunity, and advisory boards for the National Museum of the American Indian, American Civil Liberties Union, and the Delphi International Group	
Elaine Jones	Unknown	Former NAACP Legal Defense Fund Director and General Counsel	
Vivian Malone Jones	Delta Delta	Civil rights activist; first African-American to enroll and graduate from the University of Alabama despite Governor George Wallace's infamous "Stand in the Schoolhouse Door"	
Vivian Osborne Marsh	Kappa	She was extremely active in the civil rights movement and lobbied with the NAACP on the anti-lynching bill being considered in Congress.	
Mary McLeod Bethune	Honorary	Eighth president of the National Association of Colored Women; founder of the National Council of Negro Women; founder of the Literary and Industrial Training School for Negro Girls; civil rights activist; founder of Bethune-Cookman University	
Frankie Muse Freeman	St. Louis Alumnae	Civil rights attorney; first woman appointed to the United States Commission on Civil Rights (1964 to 1979)	
Betty Shabazz	New York Alumnae	Civil rights activist; Wife of slain civil rights leader Malcolm X; former director of the Medgar Evers College in Brooklyn's Department of Communications and Public Relations	
Sadie Tanner Mossell Alexander	Gamma	One of the first African Americans to receive a Ph.D. in the United States; first Black woman to receive a Ph.D. in economics from the University of Pennsylvania and in the United States; first Black woman to receive a law degree from the University of Pennsylvania Law School; first Black woman admitted to the Pennsylvania Bar	
Joan Trumpauer Mulholland	Gamma Psi	Civil rights activist; Freedom Rider; featured in PBS documentary Freedom Riders	
Eslanda Goode Robeson	New York Alumnae	Anthropologist, author, actress, civil rights activist; wife of Paul Robeson	
Amelia Boynton Robinson	Unknown	Civil rights activist; went to Selma in 1929 with George Washington Carver; inspired and convinced Dr. Martin Luther King to march on Selma in 1965; guest of honor when President Lyndon Johnson signed the Voting Rights Act into law; first African American to run for Congress in Alabama (in 1964)	
Mary Church Terrell	Honorary	Writer, civil rights and women's rights activist; first president of the National Association of Colored Women; first Black woman to represent the U.S. Congress of Women; first Black woman to serve on the Washington DC Board of Education	
Henrietta Bell Wells	Alpha Iota	Member of the Historic Wiley Debate team as portrayed in The Great Debaters; basis for Jurnee Smollett's character; first Black teacher at Bonner Elementary School	
Ida B. Wells	Unknown	A journalist, educator, and early leader in the civil rights movement and one of the founders of the National Association for the Advancement of Colored People (NAACP)	

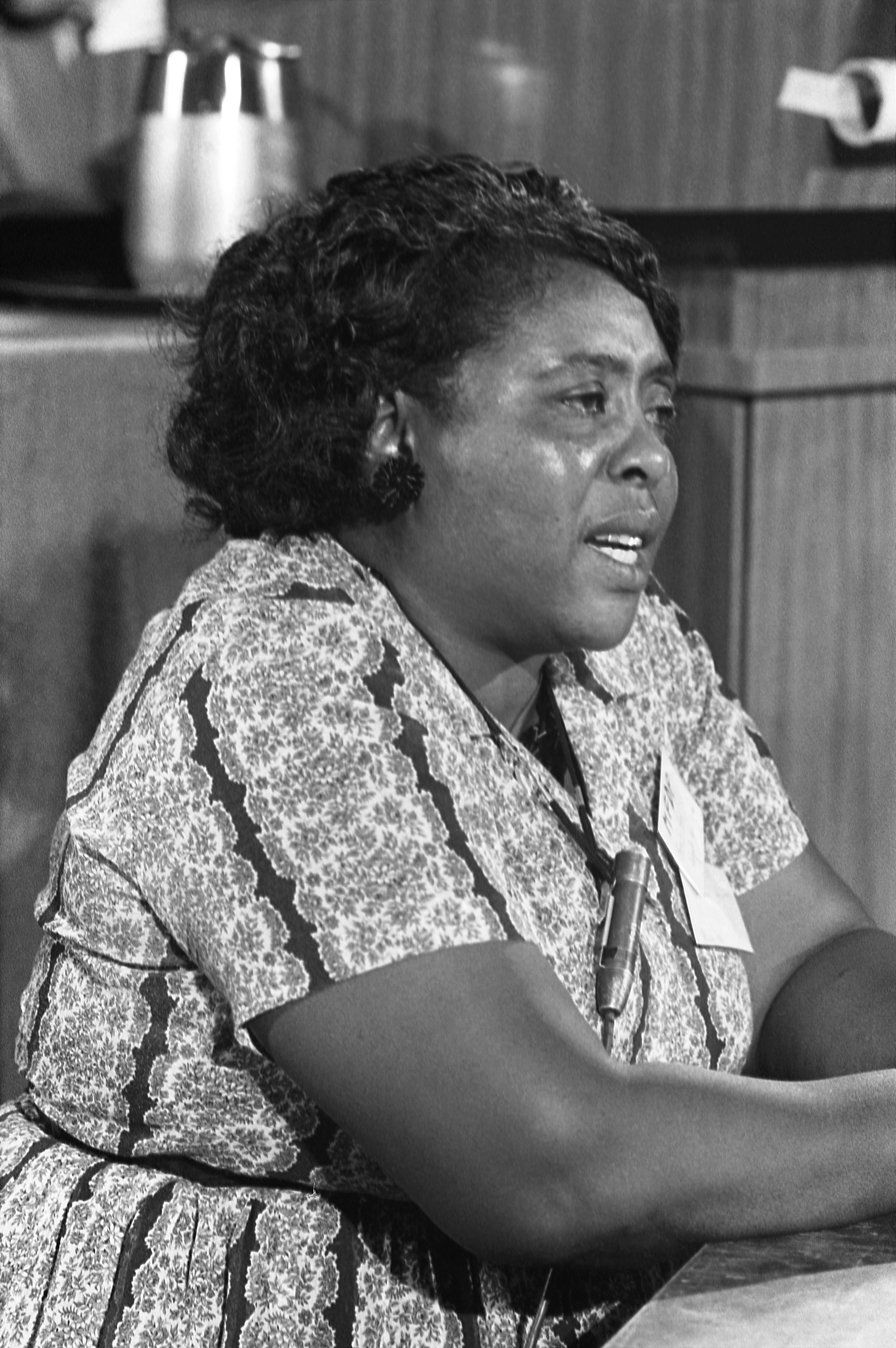
Fannie Lou Hamer

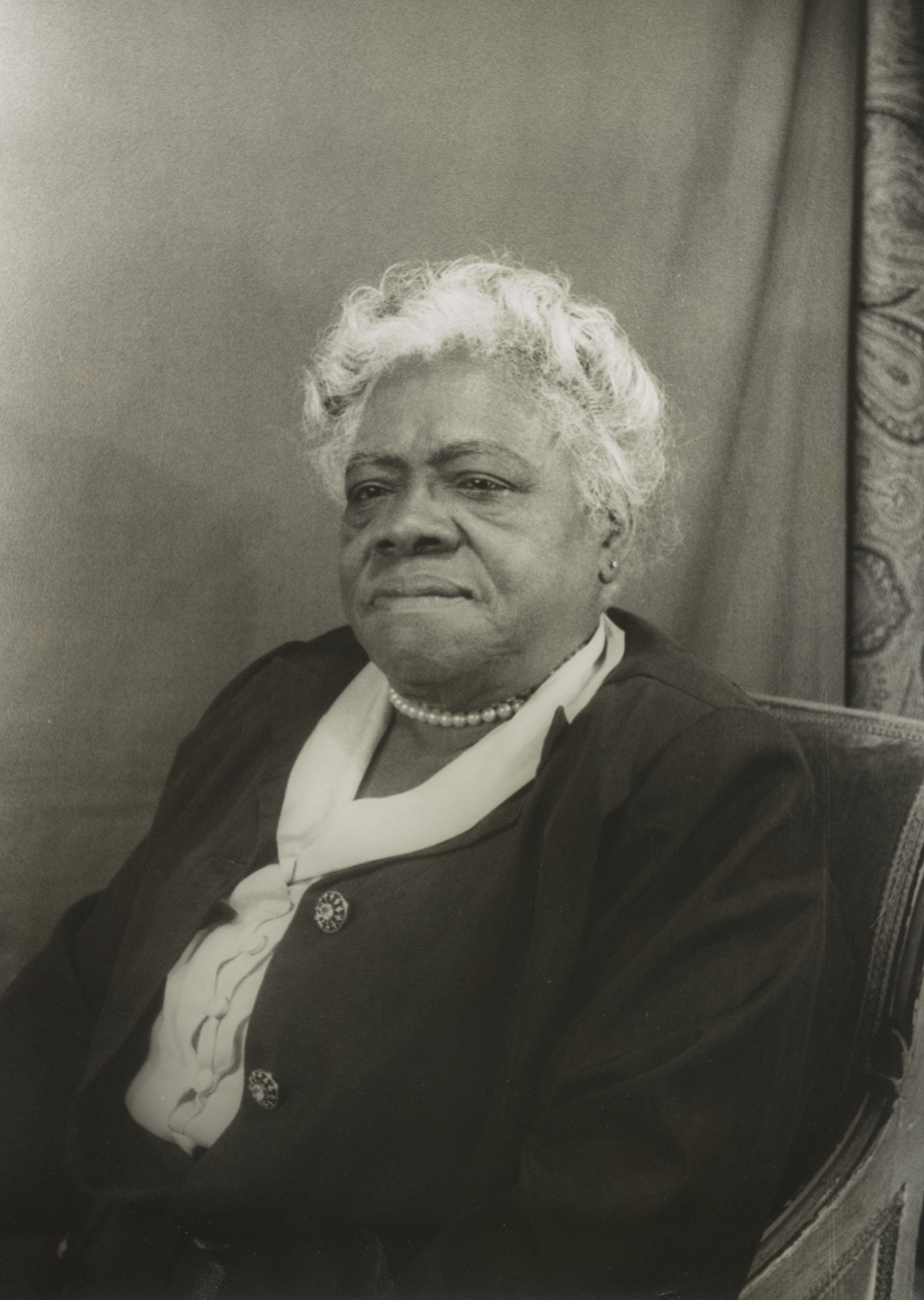
Mary McLeod Bethune

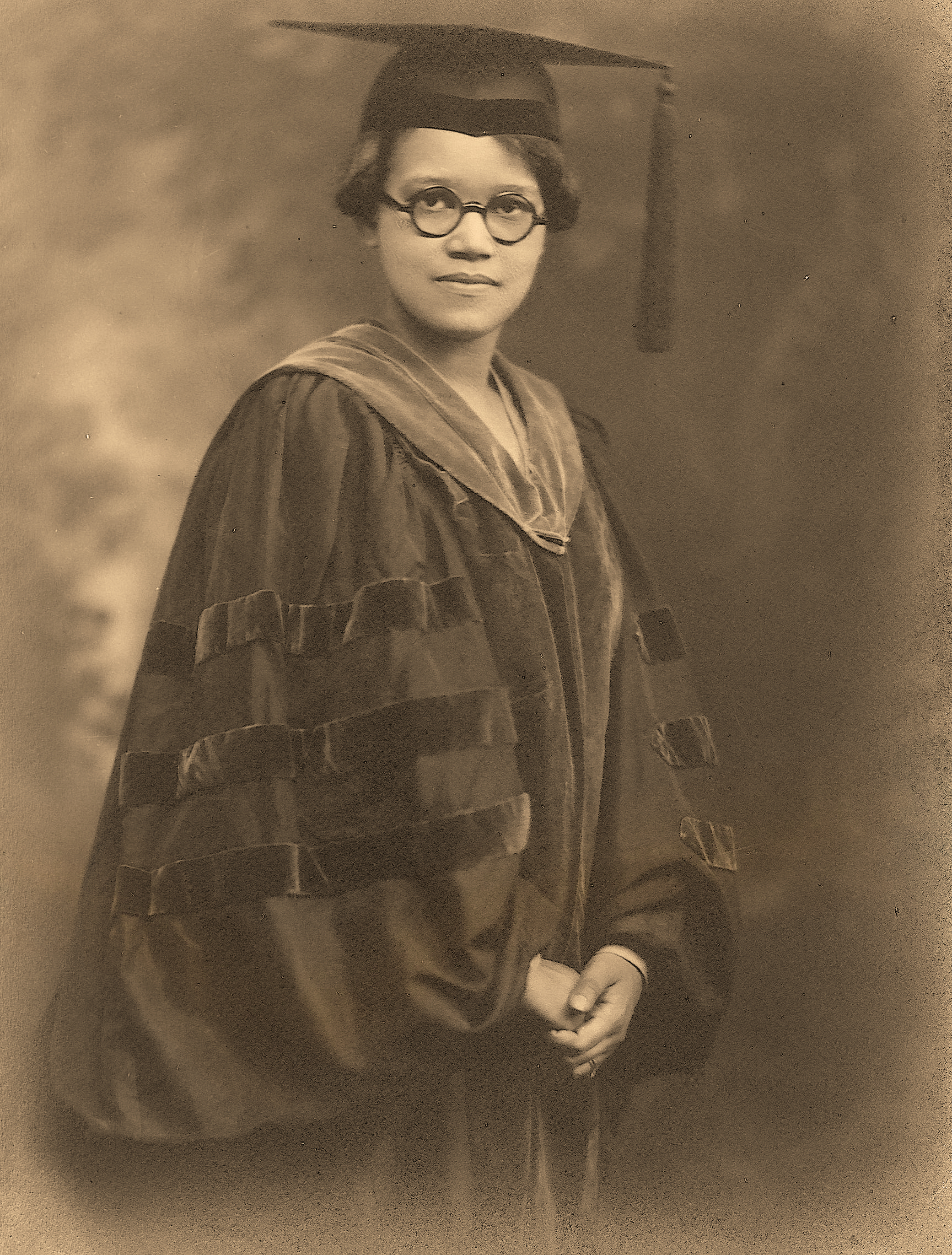
Sadie Tanner Mossell Alexander

== Education ==
Name	Original chapter	Notability	Ref.
Dorothy Pelham Beckley	Honorary	Howard University's Director of Music, 1905–1907	
Mary Frances Berry	Honorary	Geraldine R. Segal Professor of American Social Thought and Professor of History at the University of Pennsylvania; former chairwoman of the United States Commission on Civil Rights	
Gwendolyn Elizabeth Boyd	Beta Eta	first female president of Alabama State University, engineer, and the assistant for development programs at the Johns Hopkins University Applied Physics Laboratory.	
Hallie Quinn Brown	Honorary	Wilberforce University Board of Trustees member; former Dean of Allen University in Columbia, SC; President of the Ohio State Federation of Women's Clubs; Vice-President of the Ohio Council of Republican Women	
Hortense Canady	Alpha Beta	first Black elected to the Lansing Board of Education	
Constance Carroll	Unknown	Chancellor, San Diego Community College District; former President of San Diego Mesa College and Saddleback College	
Constance Clayton	Gamma	First Black female superintendent of the Philadelphia Public School system (1982-1993); national social action chairman of the Delta Sigma Theta sorority; Visual Artist	
Johnnetta Cole	Unknown	First Black female president of Spelman College (1987–199); president of Bennett College (2002–2007); current director of the Smithsonian National Museum of African Art	
Althia F. Collins	Unknown	13th president of Bennett College	
Elnora D. Daniel	Unknown	President of Chicago State University (CSU); W.K. Kellogg Foundation's Consultant on Regulatory health care reform to Lesotho, Botswana, Zimbabwe, and Swaziland	
Juliette Derricotte	New York Alumnae	Dean of Women at Fisk University	
Eva Dykes	Alpha	First woman to complete the degree requirements for her Ph.D.; one of the first African American woman to earn a PhD. in the U.S. from Radcliffe College (a total of three were earned the same year, including Sadie T.M. Alexander, another Delta Sigma Theta member)	
Ramona Edelin	Unknown	Founder and former chair of the Department of African American Studies, Northeastern University; former president and CEO of the National Urban Coalition; created the M. Carl Holman Leadership Development Institute and Executive Leadership Program to bring minorities into leadership development opportunities; former member of Presidential Board on Historically Black Colleges and Universities (appointed by Bill Clinton); former executive director of the Congressional Black Caucus Foundation	
Mary Futrell	Alpha Eta	First Black female president of National Education Association	
Muriel A. Howard	Buffalo Alumnae	First female president of Buffalo State College and 7th president of the school; first African American female chair of the United Way Campaign for Buffalo and Erie County	
Marvalene Hughes	Unknown	President of Dillard University, New Orleans, Louisiana	
Shirley Ann Jackson	Iota	Eighteenth president of Rensselaer Polytechnic Institute	
Sebetha Lee Jenkins	Delta Phi	Former President of Jarvis Christian College; former member of the Board of Advisors on Historically Black Colleges and Universities	
Anna Johnson Julian	Gamma	First African American woman in the nation to receive a Ph.D. degree in sociology; taught sociology at the University of the District of Columbia; 4th National President of Delta Sigma Theta Sorority, Inc.	
Yvonne Kennedy	Beta Eta	first Black president of Bishop State Community College; member of the Alabama House of Representatives	
Joyce Ladner	Gamma Psi	First female president of Howard University; former senior fellow at the Brookings Institution	
Julianne Malveaux	Iota	President of Bennett College; economist; columnist; author	
Marie V. McDemmond	Unknown	First President of Norfolk State University; first female CEO of a four-year, state-supported university in Virginia; first African-American woman to head any of the National Association of Colleges and University Business Officers regions	
Jeanne L. Noble	Alpha	Professor of education and one of the first African-American women to receive tenure at New York University. Presidents Nixon and Ford appointed her to serve on national educational commissions.	
Trudie K. Reed	Epsilon Beta	Former president of Bethune-Cookman University; 11th president of Philander Smith College (Little Rock, Arkansas); first female president of Philander Smith in 125 years; youngest elected General Secretary CEO	
Gloria Randle Scott	Gamma Nu	First African American President of the Girl Scouts of the USA; former President of Bennett College	
Henrietta M. Smith	Unknown	Professor, School of Information, University of South Florida; Coretta Scott King Award editor; Association for Library Service to Children Distinguished Service Award; Coretta Scott King-Virginia Hamilton Award; Eric Carle Museum of Picture Book Art award for her championship of diversity in children's literature	
Dianne Boardley Suber	Gamma Iota	10th president of Saint Augustine's College; first female president	
Niara Sudarkasa	Honorary	First female president of Lincoln University	
Josephine Washington	Honorary	Writer, educator, advocate for women's rights and racial justice; Wilberforce University Dean of Women; a copyist for Frederick Douglass during his tenure as Recorder of Deeds for DC	
Margaret Murray Washington	Honorary	Dean of Women at Tuskegee Institute; former President of National Association of Colored Women (1912–1916); third wife of Booker T. Washington; writer, educator, advocate for women's rights and racial justice; Wilberforce University Dean of Women	
Debby Lindsey-Taliefero	Alpha	In the history of Howard University, she was the first African American woman to earn a Ph.D. in Urban Economics, the first woman to be promoted to Full Professor in the Department of Finance in the School of Business, and the first recipient of the Department of Economics Distinguished Alumni Award.	

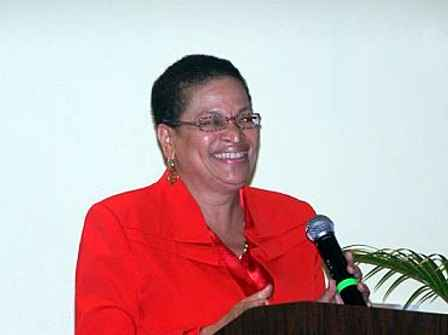
Julianne Malveaux

Debby Lindsey-Taliefero

== Entertainment ==
=== Actresses ===
Name	Original chapter	Notability	Ref.
Angela Bassett	Honorary	Actress (What's Love Got to Do With It, Waiting to Exhale, American Horror Story: Coven)	
Kim Coles	Alpha Lambda	Comedian; TV actress on The Geena Davis Show, One on One, In Living Color, Martin, and Living Single	
Ruby Dee Davis	Honorary	Actress, poet, playwright, screenwriter, journalist, and activist; won a Screen Actors Guild Award for her acting in American Gangster	
Wendy Davis	Alpha	Actress; Army Wives	
Suzzanne Douglas	Honorary	Actress, singer, composer and arts education activist; recipient of an NAACP Image Award for her role in Tap; co-starred in How Stella Got Her Groove Back and The Parent Hood	
Amber Efé	Alpha	Broadway actress; co-star in Legally Blonde: The Musical; one of Ebony magazine's "30 Leaders under 30" for 2008	
Aunjanue Ellis	Gamma Psi	Broadway actress in August Wilson's Tony Award-winning stageplay Joe Turner's Come and Gone; film actress in The Taking of Pelham 123, Cover, Undercover Brother, and Ray; and television actress in Gifted Hands: The Ben Carson Story	
Gloria Foster	Honorary	Theater actress and two-time Obie Award winner for In White America and A Raisin in the Sun; played Sadie Delaney in Having Our Say and The Oracle in The Matrix and The Matrix Reloaded	
Renée Elise Goldsberry	Theta Beta	Broadway actress known for her Tony Award-winning portrayal of Angelica Schuyler in the original Broadway production of Hamilton; originated the role of Nettie in the Broadway production of The Color Purple	
Ellen Holly	Rho	Actress; played Clara "Carla" Hall onOne Life to Live from 1968 to 1981, and again from 1983 to 1985	
Adrienne-Joi Johnson	Eta Kappa	Actress in A Different World, In the Heat of the Night, The Fresh Prince of Bel Air, and Amen; fitness trainer	
T'Keyah Crystal Keymáh	Beta Alpha	Comedian; actress; In Living Color, That's So Raven	
Daphne Maxwell Reid	Honorary	First Black woman to appear on the cover of Glamour magazine; played Vivian Banks on the NBC sitcom The Fresh Prince of Bel-Air; co-owns and operates New Millennium Studios with her husband Tim Reid in Petersburg, Virginia	
Theresa Merritt	Honorary	Actress of stage, screen and television; starred in the family sitcom That's My Mama and in The Wiz	
Novella Nelson	Rho	Singer and actress; plays Roland's mother on Army Wives; created the role of "Aunt Missy" in the original Broadway production of Purlie; films include Antwone Fisher and Birth	
Keshia Knight Pulliam	Eta Kappa	Played Rudy Huxtable on The Cosby Show; starred in Tyler Perry's Madea Goes to Jail; currently acting in Madea's House of Payne	
Sheryl Lee Ralph	Honorary	Deidra "Dee" Mitchell on Moesha; humanitarian educating communities on HIV/AIDS awareness	
Cicely Tyson	Honorary	Emmy Award-winning actress; notable for roles in The Autobiography of Miss Jane Pittman and Roots	
Sharon Warren	Epsilon Eta	Played Ray Charles' mother Aretha Robinson in Ray	
Kym Whitley	Alpha Beta	Comedian; film actress in Fun With Dick and Jane, Along Came Polly, Deliver Us From Eva and Next Friday; TV actress on Curb Your Enthusiasm, Married... with Children, and Moesha; former creator and co-host of Oh Drama!	
Lisa Nicole Wilkerson	Theta Alpha	Broadway actress; played Anna Gordy in Motown: The Musical, Nala in The Lion King, and dance captain and fight captain in the Tony Award winner The Gershwins' Porgy and Bess, for which she won the 2012 Fred and Adele Astaire Award for "Outstanding Female Dancer in a Broadway Show"	

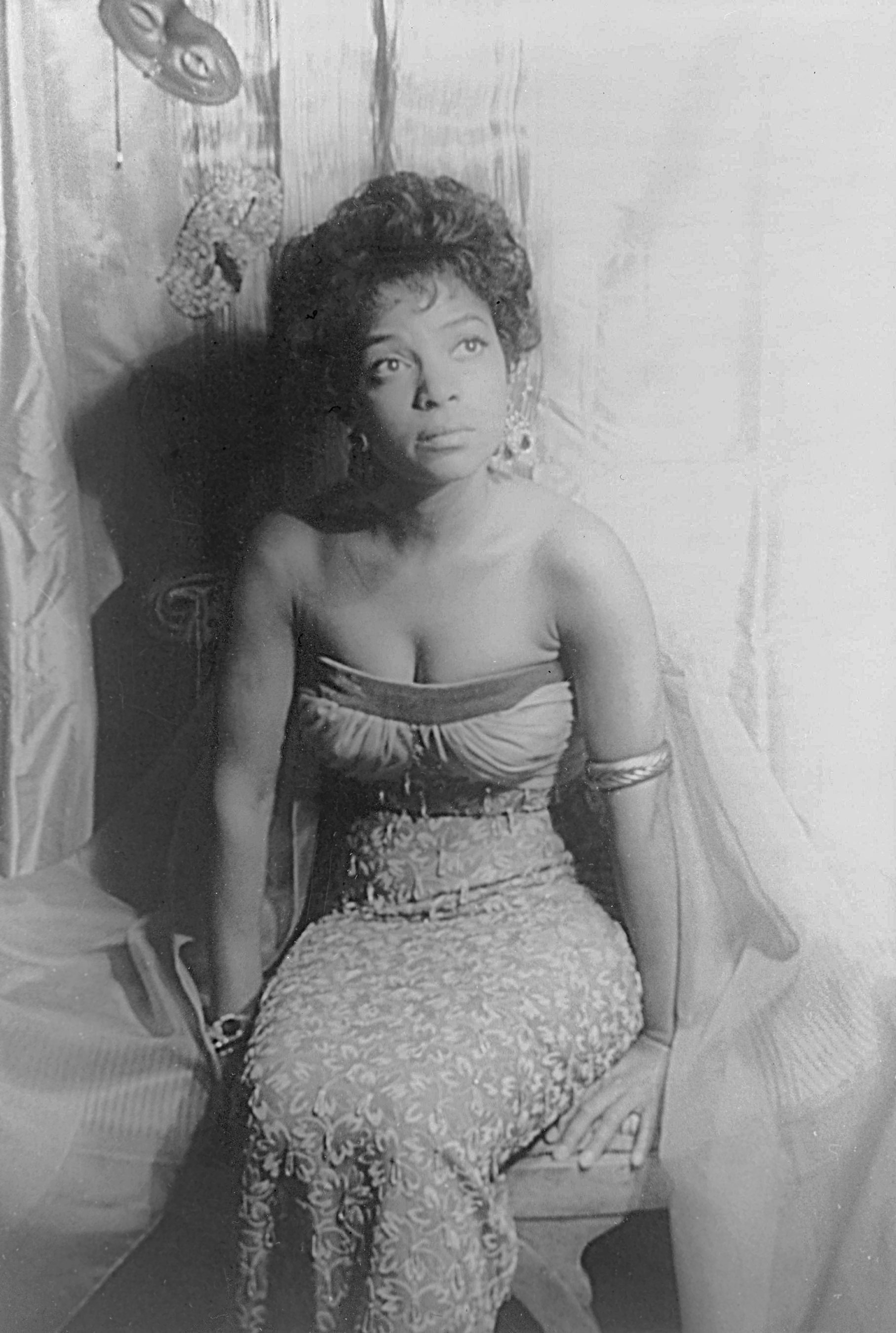
Ruby Dee Davis

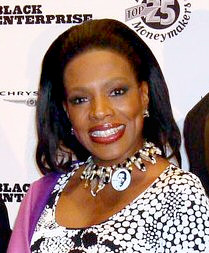
Sheryl Lee Ralph

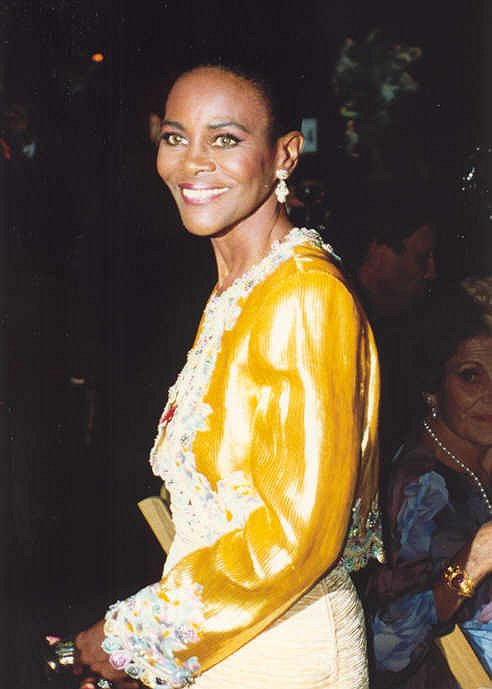
Cicely Tyson

=== Dancers ===
Name / Original chapter / Notability / Ref.; Judith Jamison / Honorary / Dancer and choreographer; Artistic Director of the Alvin Ailey American Dance Theater; one of 2009 Time magazine's 100 Most Influential People in the World; Kennedy Center Honors (1999) and the National Medal of Arts (2001); Emmy Award winner and American Choreography Award winner for Outstanding Choreography for the PBS Great Performances: Dance In America special, "A Hymn for Alvin Ailey"

=== Beauty contestants ===
Name	Original chapter	Notability	Ref.
Kimberly Clarice Aiken-Cockerham	Epsilon Tau	Miss America in 1994	
Ericka Dunlap	Mu Iota	Miss America in 2004	
Crystle Stewart	Unknown	Miss USA 2008	

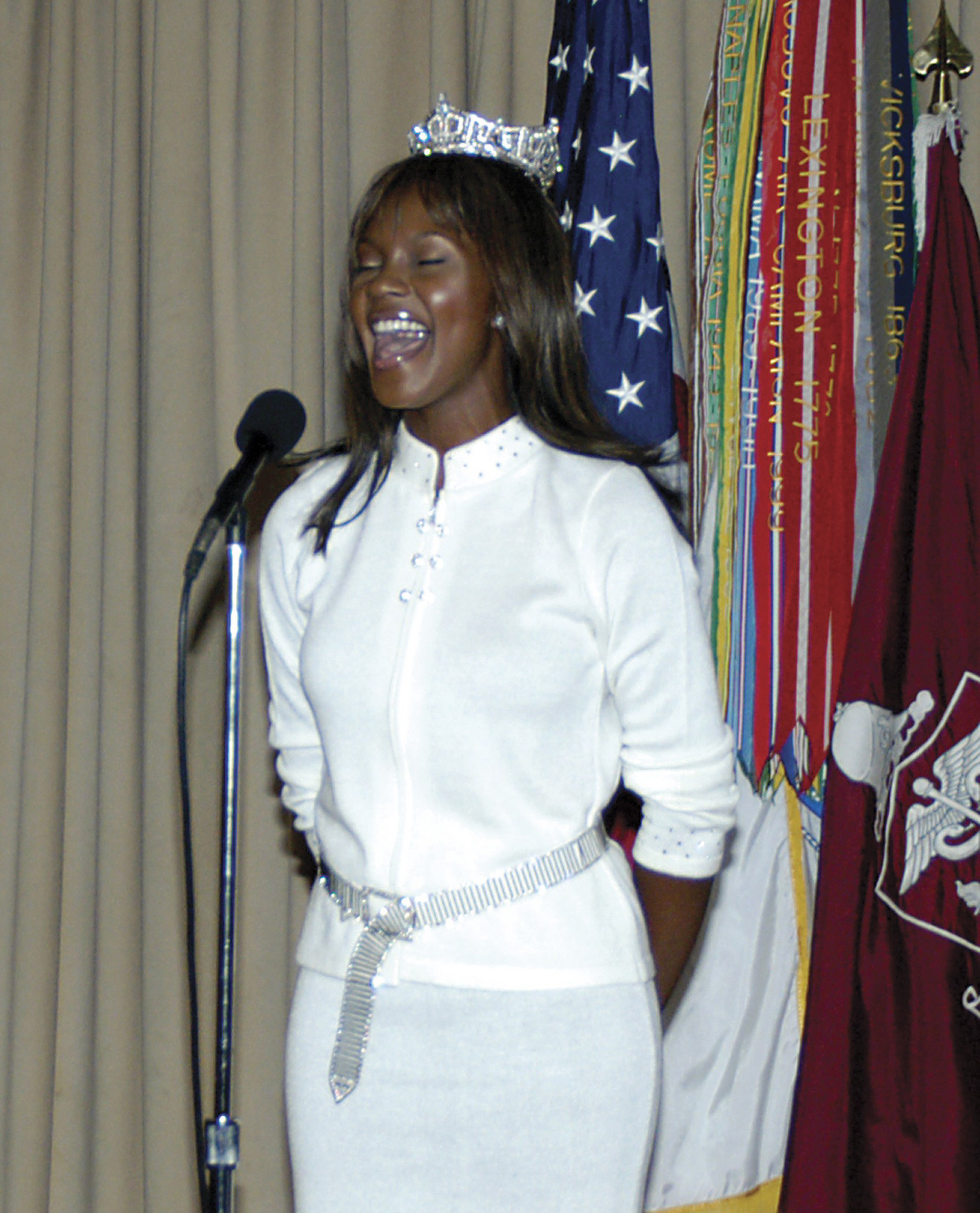
Ericka Dunlap

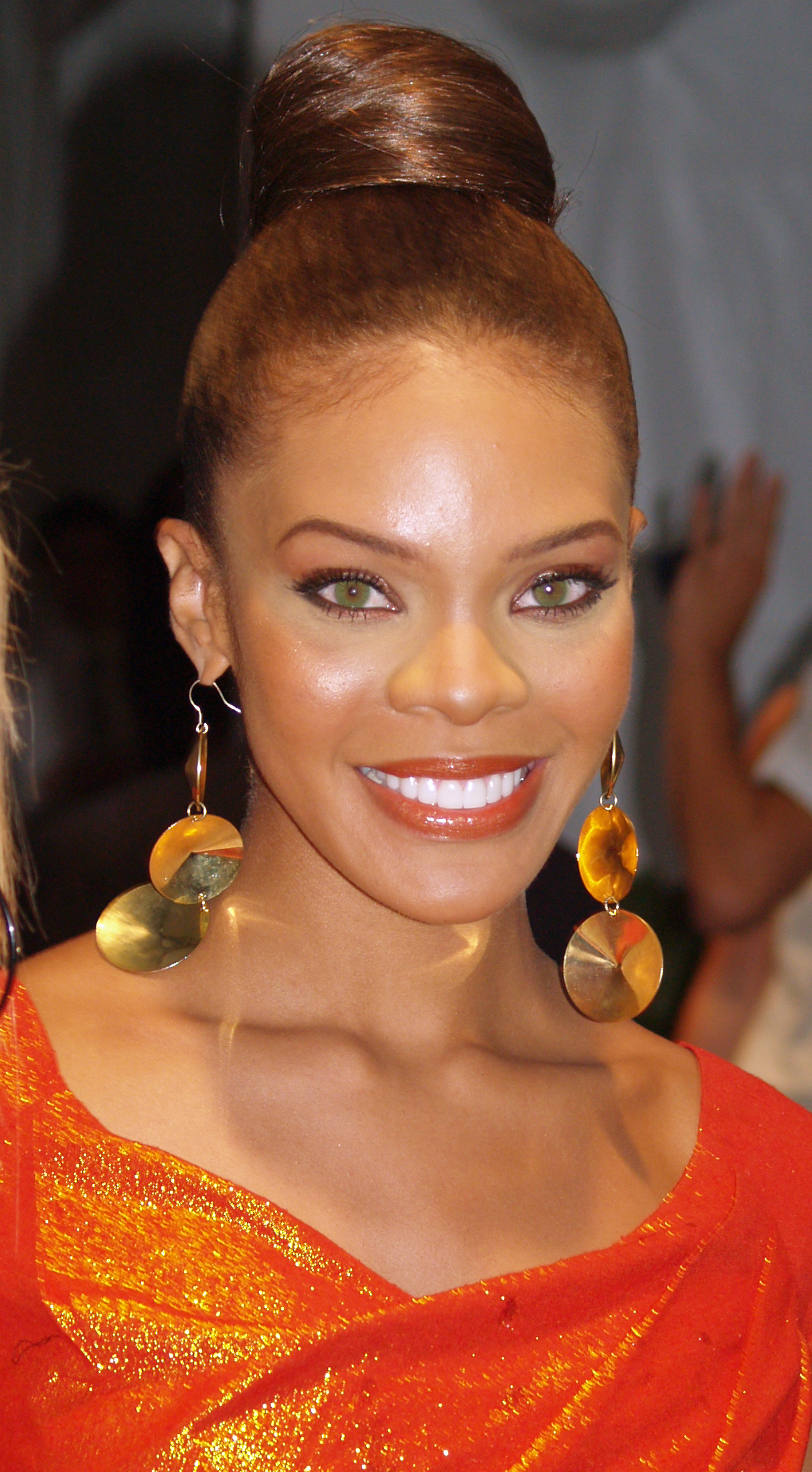
Crystle Stewart

=== Singers and musicians ===
Name	Original chapter	Notability	Ref.
Germaine Bazzle	New Orleans Alumnae	Jazz vocalist; director of musical education at Xavier Prep in New Orleans	
Harolyn Blackwell	Iota Iota	Soprano; opera singer	
Shirley Caesar	Honorary	Known as the "First Lady of Gospel"; gospel singer	
Maurette Brown Clark	Kappa Phi	Gospel singer	
Florence Cole Talbert	Honorary	Opera singer; composer of the official "Delta Hymn"; Dean of Music at Wiley College	
Natalie Cole	Upsilon	Singer of "This Will Be (An Everlasting Love)"	
Roberta Flack	Alpha	Singer of "Killing Me Softly with His Song"	
Aretha Franklin	Honorary	R&B and classically trained opera performer; singer of "Respect"; "Queen of Soul"	
Shirley Graham Du Bois	Alpha Gamma	Composer of the opera Tom-Tom; second wife of W. E. B. Du Bois	
Lena Horne	Honorary	Jazz, pop, and Broadway singer	
Dorothy Maynor	Gamma Iota	Soprano; opera singer	
K. Michelle	Beta Alpha	Recording artist, pianist, songwriter	
Leontyne Price	Beta	Soprano; opera singer; awarded the United States Medal of Freedom by President Lyndon B. Johnson	
Philippa Schuyler	Honorary	Musical child prodigy and pianist; journalist; daughter of Harlem Renaissance writer George Schuyler	
Beverly Sills	Honorary	Operatic soprano; called "America's Queen of Opera" by Time	
Somi	Alpha Nu	Jazz vocalist, composer, and writer; Grammy-nominee and two-time winner of NAACP Image Award for Best Jazz Vocal Album; first African woman nominated in any of the Grammy jazz categories	
Crystal Taliefero	Gamma Nu	Multi-instrumentalist and vocalist	
Támar	Upsilon	Actress in several Tyler Perry plays; finalist on The Voice	
Chelsey Green	Columbia(MD) Alumnae	Violinist; international recording artist; first Black woman elected as The Recording Academy Chair of the Board of Trustees	
Leslie Uggams	Honorary	Emmy and Tony Award-winning singer in Hallelujah, Baby!; played "Kizzy" in Alex Haley's Roots	
Nancy Wilson	Honorary	Grammy Award-winning blues, jazz, cabaret and pop singer	

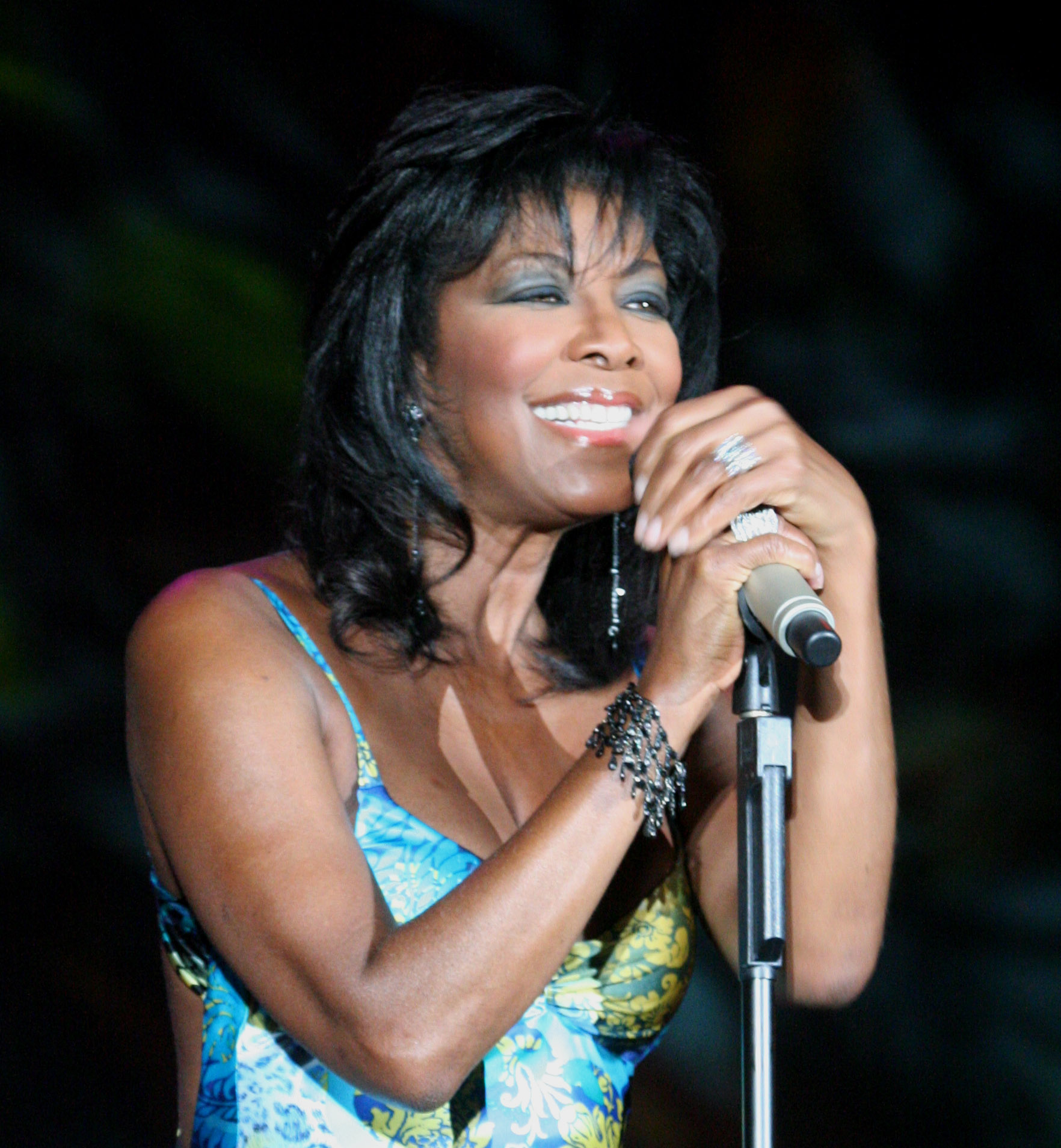
Natalie Cole

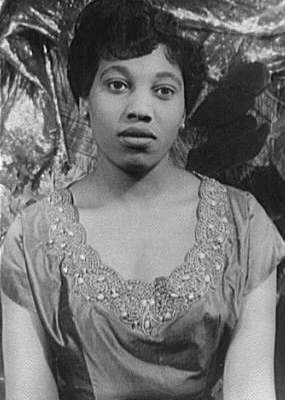
Leontyne Price

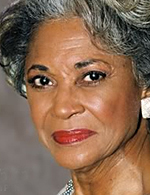
Nancy Wilson

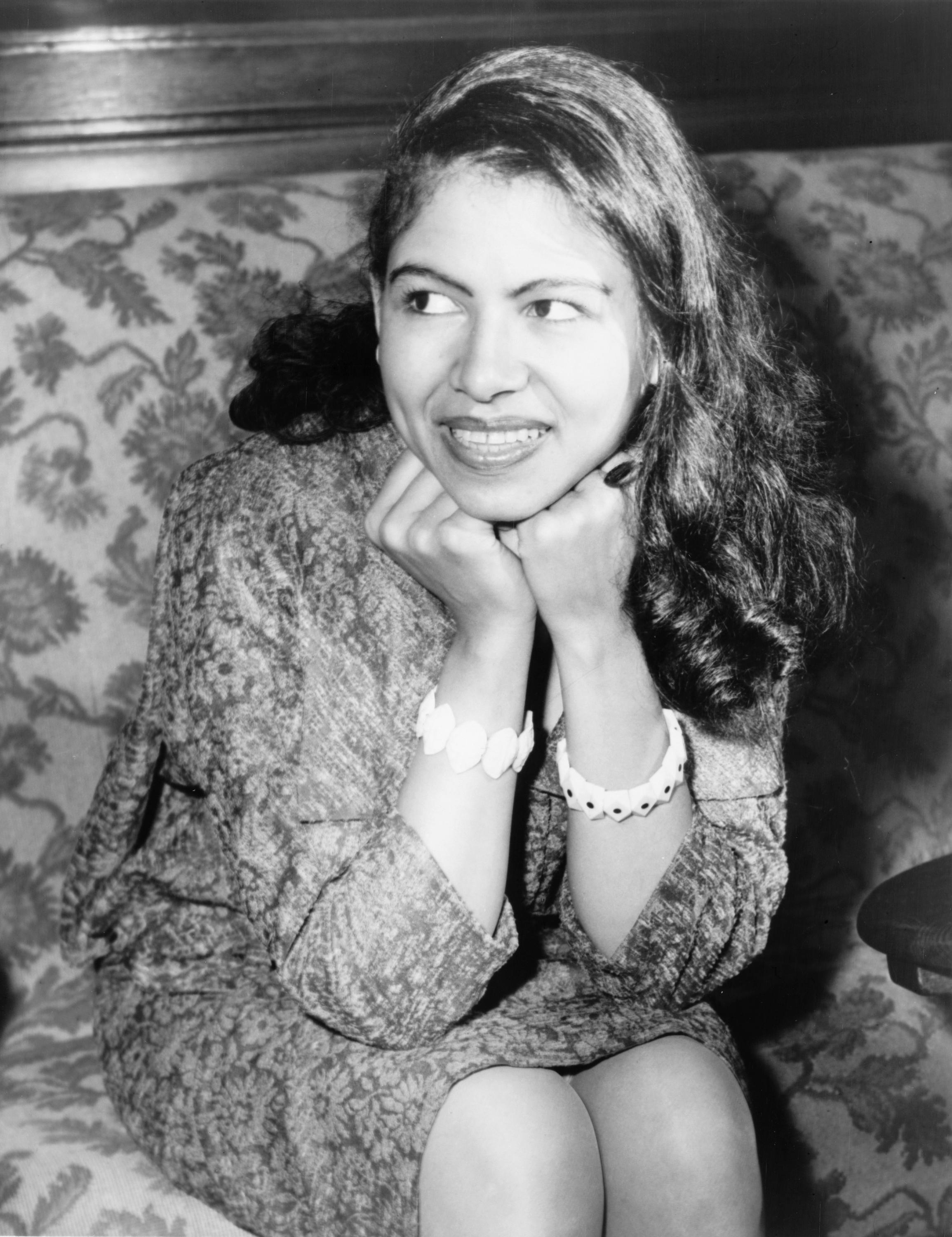
Philippa Duke Schuyler

=== Television and radio ===
Name	Original chapter	Notability	Ref.
Mara Brock Akil	Theta Alpha	Television writer and producer; creator of Girlfriends and The Game	
Cheryl Burton	Chicago Alumnae	Emmy Award-winning news anchor at WLS-TV in Chicago	
Polly Spiegel Cowan	Honorary	Radio and television producer; political activist; National Council of Negro Women board member; organizer of Wednesdays in Mississippi	
Sara V. Finney-Johnson	Upsilion	TV producer, writer, co-creator of Moesha	
Melissa Harris-Perry	Pi Omicron	Professor of political science at Wake Forest University; former associate professor of politics and African-American studies at Tulane University and Princeton University; author of Barbershops, Bibles, and BET: Everyday Talk and Black Political Thought; guest host and contributor on The Rachel Maddow Show	
JC Hayward	Unknown	News anchor at WUSA9 in Washington DC; vice president of Media Outreach; first DC market female news anchor	
Charlayne Hunter-Gault	Tau	Africa Bureau Chief for Essence Magazine; journalist for CNN	
Gwen Ifill	Honorary	Managing Editor and moderator for Washington Week; Senior Correspondent for The NewsHour on PBS	
Soledad O'Brien	Honorary	Anchor and special correspondent, CNN	
Robi Reed-Humes	Gamma Iota	Emmy Award-winning casting director (The Tuskegee Airmen & Malcolm X); contributor to the success of over 30 films, including eight with director Spike Lee (Malcolm X); TV credits include Bill Cosby's A Different World and LL Cool J's In the House	
Jacque Reid	New York Alumnae	News contributor for The Tom Joyner Morning Show; former anchorwoman on BET Nightly News; former co-host of the radio show The Steve Harvey Show	
Shaila Scott	Kappa Rho	Radio personality for 98.7 KissFM New York; former Miss Teen New York	
Mary E. Vroman	Honorary	First Black woman accepted into membership in the Screen Writers' Guild; wrote Shaped to its Purpose, Delta Sigma Theta, the First Fifty Years	
April Woodard	Kappa Rho	Senior Reporter, Inside Edition; celebrity news commentator; former Miss Black USA; former 2nd runner-up for Miss Virginia	

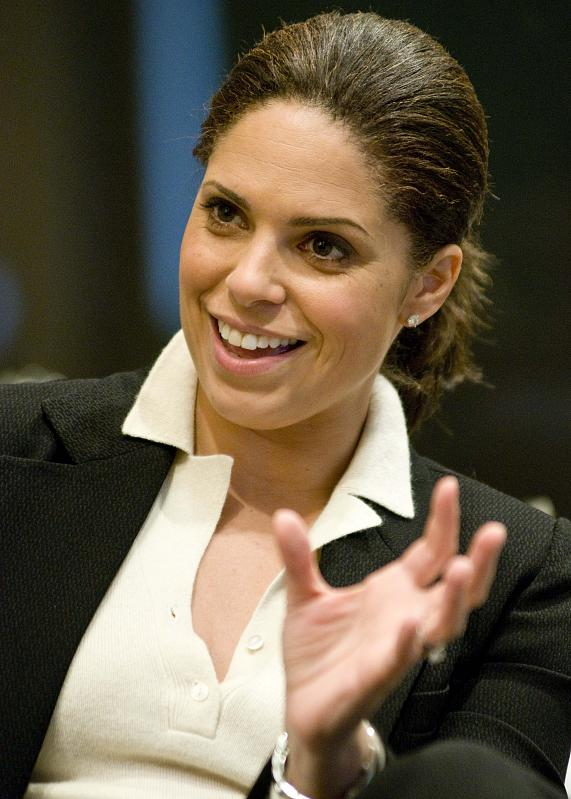
Soledad O'Brien

== Government ==
Name	Original chapter	Notability	Ref.
Shirley Barnes	Rho	Former Ambassador to Madagascar	
Viola O. Baskerville	Richmond Alumnae	Former Secretary of Administration to Virginia Governor Timothy Kaine; second African American and the only African American female cabinet head in his administration; former vice mayor of the Richmond City Council; former member of the Virginia House of Delegates; first African American woman to run for Lieutenant Governor in VA	
Jacqueline A. Berrien	Brooklyn Alumnae	Head of the Equal Employment Opportunity Commission	
Gloria Bryant Banks	Beta Gamma	Former Secretary of the Department of Social Services, State of Louisiana	
Alexis Herman	Gamma Alpha	First African-American Secretary of Labor (1997–2001)	
Lisa P. Jackson	Honorary	Administrator of the Environmental Protection Agency under President Barack Obama, 2009-2013; Environmental Director for Apple, Inc.	
Anne Forrester Holloway	Unknown	U.S. Ambassador to Mali	
Suzan Johnson Cook	Honorary	Policy advisor to President Bill Clinton; Ambassador-at-Large under President Barack Obama; dean and professor of communications at Harvard University; first female senior pastor in the 200-year history of the American Baptist Churches USA	
Margaret McDonald	Honorary	Former Ambassador to the U.S. from Nassau, Bahamas	
Cherelle Parker	Zeta Omega	First female mayor of Philadelphia; member, Philadelphia City Council, 2016-2022; member, Pennsylvania House of Representatives, 2005-2015	
June Carter Perry	Unknown	U.S. Ambassador to the Republic of Sierra Leone	
Esther Peterson	Honorary	Director of the Office of Consumer Affairs and director of the United States Women's Bureau	
Patricia Roberts Harris	Alpha	First Black female U.S. Ambassador (1965; Luxembourg), first African-American Secretary of Housing and Urban Development	
Barbara Mae Watson	Honorary	First African American woman to serve as a Chief of State Department Bureau; former Assistant Secretary of State for Consular Affairs for the U.S. State Department; first African American woman to serve as a U.S. Ambassador; former Ambassador to Malaysia (August 20, 1980 – February 1981)	

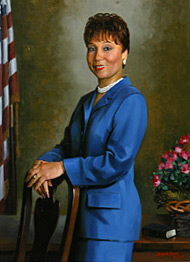
Alexis Herman

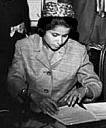
Patricia Roberts Harris

== Law ==
=== Judges ===
Name	Original chapter	Notability	Ref.
Vicki Ballou-Watts	Alpha	Circuit Court Judge (Baltimore County, Maryland)	
DeAndrea G. Benjamin	Unknown	Judge of the South Carolina Circuit Court for the 5th Circuit; Judge of the United States Court of Appeals for the Fourth Circuit, first African American woman from South Carolina to serve on the Fourth Circuit	
Patricia Ann Blackmon	Gamma Psi	Judge – Eighth District Court of Appeals; first African American woman elected to any Court of Appeals for the State of Ohio; first Night Prosecutor, City of Cleveland	
Izetta F. Bright	Detroit Alumnae	Judge, 36th District Court (Detroit, MI)	
Jean Murrell Capers	Unknown	Former Municipal Court Judge (Cleveland); first African American woman in the U.S. to be elected as a city council member; first to serve as an Assistant County Prosecutor in Cuyahoga County	
J. Michelle Childs	Kappa Iota	United States district judge of the United States District Court for the District of South Carolina	
Kim Berkeley Clark	Alpha Chi	Administrative Judge, Family Court, 5th Judicial District, PA	
Norma Dotson-Sales	Detroit Alumnae	Judge, 36th District Court (Detroit, MI)	
Karen Fort Hood	Detroit Alumnae	Judge, 1st District Court of Appeals (Detroit, MI)	
Karen Freeman-Wilson	Xi Tau	former Indiana Attorney General	
Patrice A. Hinnant	Unknown	First woman elected by the Democratic Party to serve as a district court judge, 18th Judicial District (Guilford County, NC); first African American female assistant public defender	
Charlene Honeywell	Unknown	Federal District Court Judge, Middle District of Florida; former Circuit Court Judge, 13th Judicial Circuit of Florida	
M. Yvette Miller	Unknown	First African American woman on Georgia Court of Appeals	
Tanya Walton Pratt	Eta Kappa	Nominee for the Federal District Court Bench for the Southern District of Indiana; Judge, Probate Division of the Marion County Superior Court	
Gloria C. Reno	Unknown	Associate Circuit Court Judge – Division 36 for Family Court (St. Louis, Missouri)	
C. Lorene Royster	Detroit Alumnae	Judge, District Court (Detroit, MI)	
Juanita Kidd Stout	Alpha Theta	Justice, Supreme Court of Pennsylvania, 1988–1989	
Ann Claire Williams	Tau	Appointed by President Ronald Reagan as the first African American woman on the Federal District Court in Illinois	

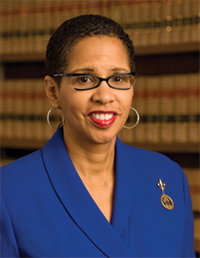
Hon. Ann Claire Williams

=== Law enforcement ===
Name	Original chapter	Notability	Ref.
Cassi Chandler	Iota Theta	Assistant Director for Training at the Federal Bureau of Investigation (FBI)	
Val Demings	Orlando Alumnae	First female Chief of Police of the Orlando Police Department	
Beverly J. Harvard	Gamma Zeta	Former Chief of the Atlanta Police Department; first African American woman in the nation to run a major police department	

=== Law – other ===
Name	Original chapter	Notability	Ref.
Sadie T. M. Alexander	Gamma	first African-American woman to receive a Ph.D. in the United States, first Black woman to practice law in Pennsylvania, and the first national president of Delta Sigma Theta Sorority. Chair of the White House Conference on Aging.	
Helen Elsie Austin	Zeta	first African-American woman to become assistant attorney general of the state of Ohio.	
Dorothy Rabb Brown	Alpha Tau	First African American elected clerk of the Circuit Court (Cook County, Illinois)	
Jewel Carter Stradford Lafontant-Mankarious	Unknown	First American woman to be admitted into the International Academy of Trial Lawyers; first female Deputy Solicitor General of the U.S., Nixon Administration; Assistant U.S. Attorney for the Northern District of Illinois under President Dwight D. Eisenhower	
Nicole Y. Lamb-Hale	Nu	Assistant Secretary, Manufacturing and Services, United States Department of Commerce; former Deputy General Counsel, United States Department of Commerce	
Loretta Lynch		an attorney from the Eastern District of New York. On April 24, 2015, she was confirmed as Attorney General of the United States of America, making her the first African American woman to hold the position	
Portia Roberson	Detroit Alumnae	Director of Intergovernmental Affairs and Public Liaison, United States Department of Justice (under President Barack Obama); former Associate General Counsel, Detroit Medical Center	
Gertrude Rush	Honorary	first African American female admitted to the National Bar Association	
Althea T. L. Simmons		civil rights activist and attorney, who was the head of the Washington, D.C. branch of the NAACP from 1979 to 1990. The Delta Sigma Theta Sorority Social Action Award is named for her.	

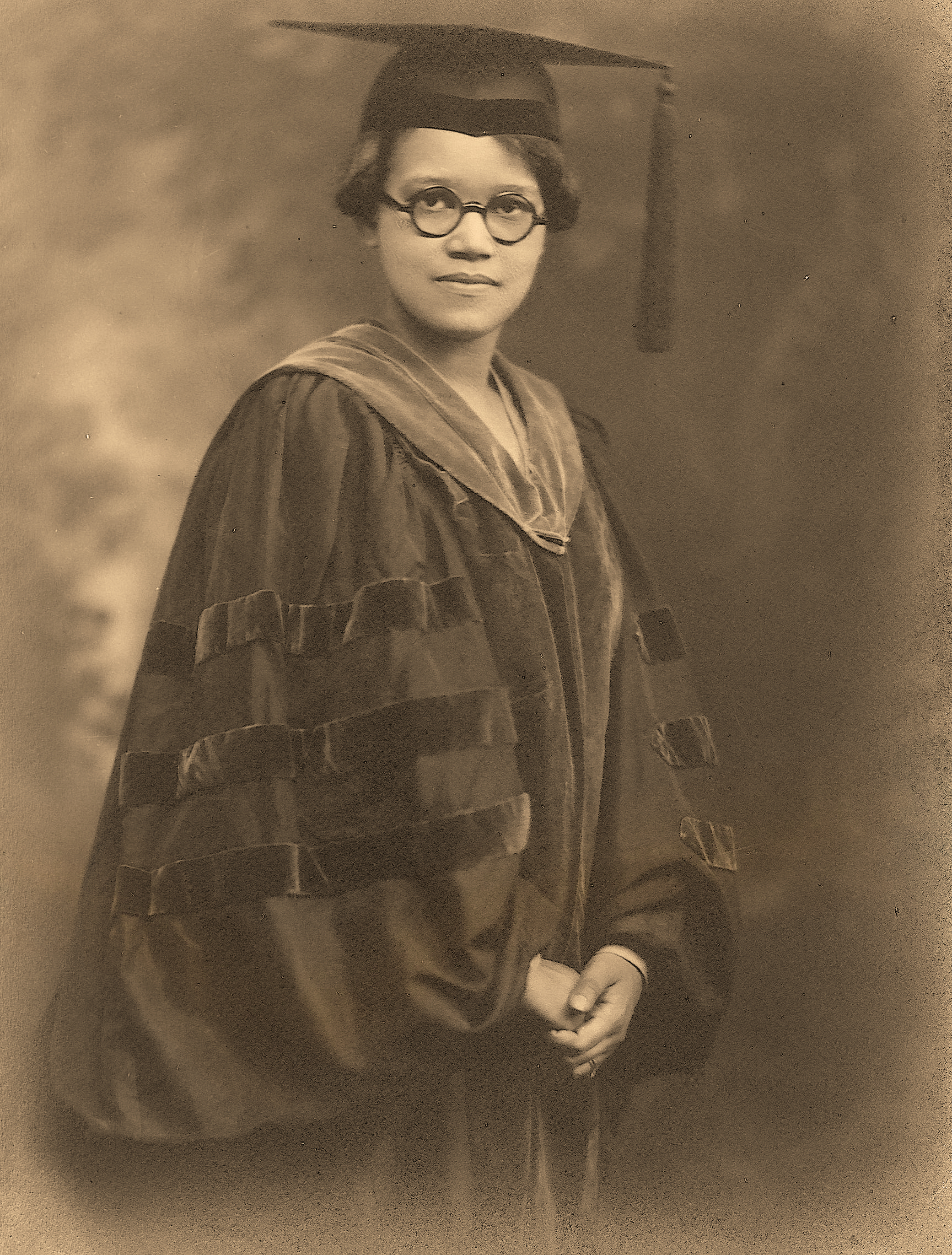
Sadie T. M. Alexander

== Literature and journalism ==
Name	Original chapter	Notability	Ref.
Harriette Cole	Alpha	Creative director for Ebony magazine; author of How to Be: A Guide to Living with Grace and Integrity; image consultant	
Alice Dunbar-Nelson	Honorary	Poet and author of short stories; wife of Paul Dunbar; first woman to serve on the Delaware State Republican Committee	
Frankie Muse Freeman	St. Louis Alumnae	Author of A Song of Faith and Hope: The Life of Frankie Muse Freeman. Appointed by President Lyndon B Johnson, she was the first woman to serve on the United States Civil Rights Commission. As president, she was responsible for increasing sorority activism during the Civil Rights Movement.	
Paula Giddings	Alpha	Author of When and Where I Enter: The Impact of Black Women on Race and Sex in America and In Search of Sisterhood	
Jessie Redmon Fauset	Honorary	Novelist during the Harlem Renaissance	
Nikki Giovanni	Honorary	Poet	
Gloria Naylor	Honorary	Author of The Women of Brewster Place	
Ethel L. Payne	Honorary	"First Lady of the Black Press", first Black woman journalist to cover international affairs; columnist, lecturer, and freelance writer	
Gladys Byram Shepperd	Lambda	author of several books, including a biographical sketch entitled "Mary Church Terrell: Respectable Person."	;
Susan L. Taylor	Honorary	Former editor-in-chief of Essence magazine	

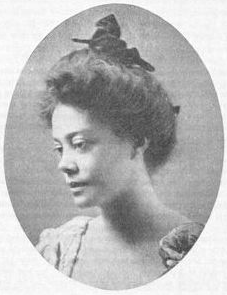
Alice Dunbar-Nelson

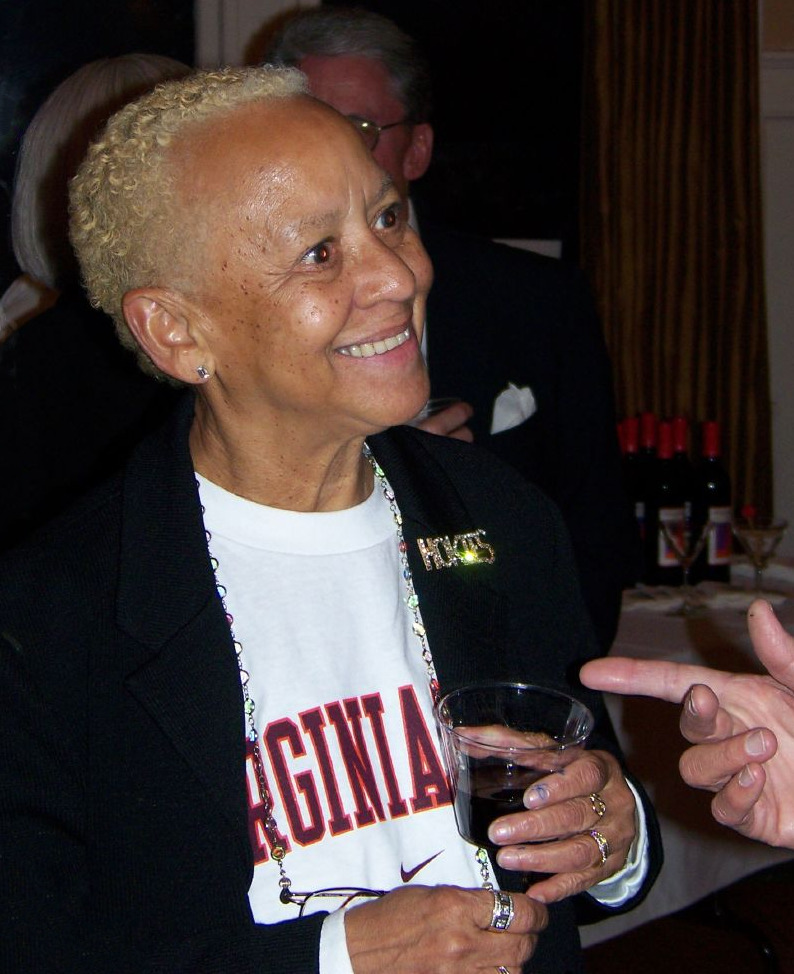
Nikki Giovanni

== Medicine and science ==
Name	Original chapter	Notability	Ref.
Regina Benjamin	Gamma Alpha	United States Surgeon General; third African-American woman to be appointed Surgeon General; first physician under the age of 40 and first African American woman named to the American Medical Association's Board of Trustees; former president of the Alabama State Medical Association; recipient of MacArthur Genius Award	
Dorothy Levinia Brown	Unknown	First African-American female surgeon in the South; first African American woman elected to the Tennessee State Legislature	
Alexa Canady	Nu	First African-American female neurosurgeon	
May Edwards Chinn	New York Alumnae	First African American woman to graduate from Bellevue Hospital Medical College; one of the first female African American physicians in New York City	
Joycelyn Elders	Gamma Gamma	United States Surgeon General (1993–1994); first African American, and the second woman, to be appointed Surgeon General; first African American Resident Pediatrician at the University of Arkansas Medical Center	
Bettye Washington Greene	Charter member of Midland, Michigan chapter	First African-American female Ph.D. chemist to work in a professional position at the Dow Chemical Company	
Ruth Bates Harris	Unknown	First female Deputy Assistant Administrator of NASA	
Joan Higginbotham	Unknown	Engineer; former NASA astronaut who flew on the Space Shuttle Discovery mission STS-116 as a mission specialist; third African-American woman to go into space	
Kalimah Johnson	Tau	Founder and executive director of the SASHA (Sexual Assault Services for Holistic Healing and Awareness) Center in Detroit, Michigan	
Edith Irby Jones	Gamma Mu	First African American student to attend the University of Arkansas School of Medicine; first female president of the National Medical Association	
Ayana Jordan	Unknown	Addiction psychiatrist	
Audrey F. Manley	Honorary	Acting Surgeon General of the US (1995–1997;) second African-American female Surgeon General; first alumna president of Spelman College (1997–2002)	
Fatima Cody Stanford	Omicron Xi	First African-American fellowship-trained obesity medicine physician scientist; National Academy of Medicine Scholar in Diagnostic Excellence; Dietary Guidelines for Americans Advisory Committee Member	
Betty Smith Williams	Unknown	Founder, charter member, and 7th president of the National Black Nurses Association; American Academy of Nursing fellow	
Geraldine Pittman Woods	Alpha	Woods, who received advanced degrees from Radcliffe and Harvard Universities, was instrumental in the development of the Minority Access to Research Careers of the National Institute of Health. She was the first Black woman appointed to the National Advisory General Medical Services Council.	

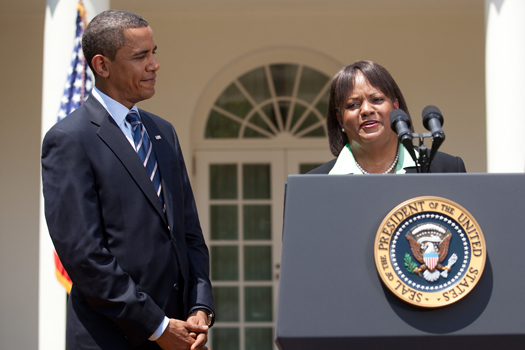
Regina Benjamin

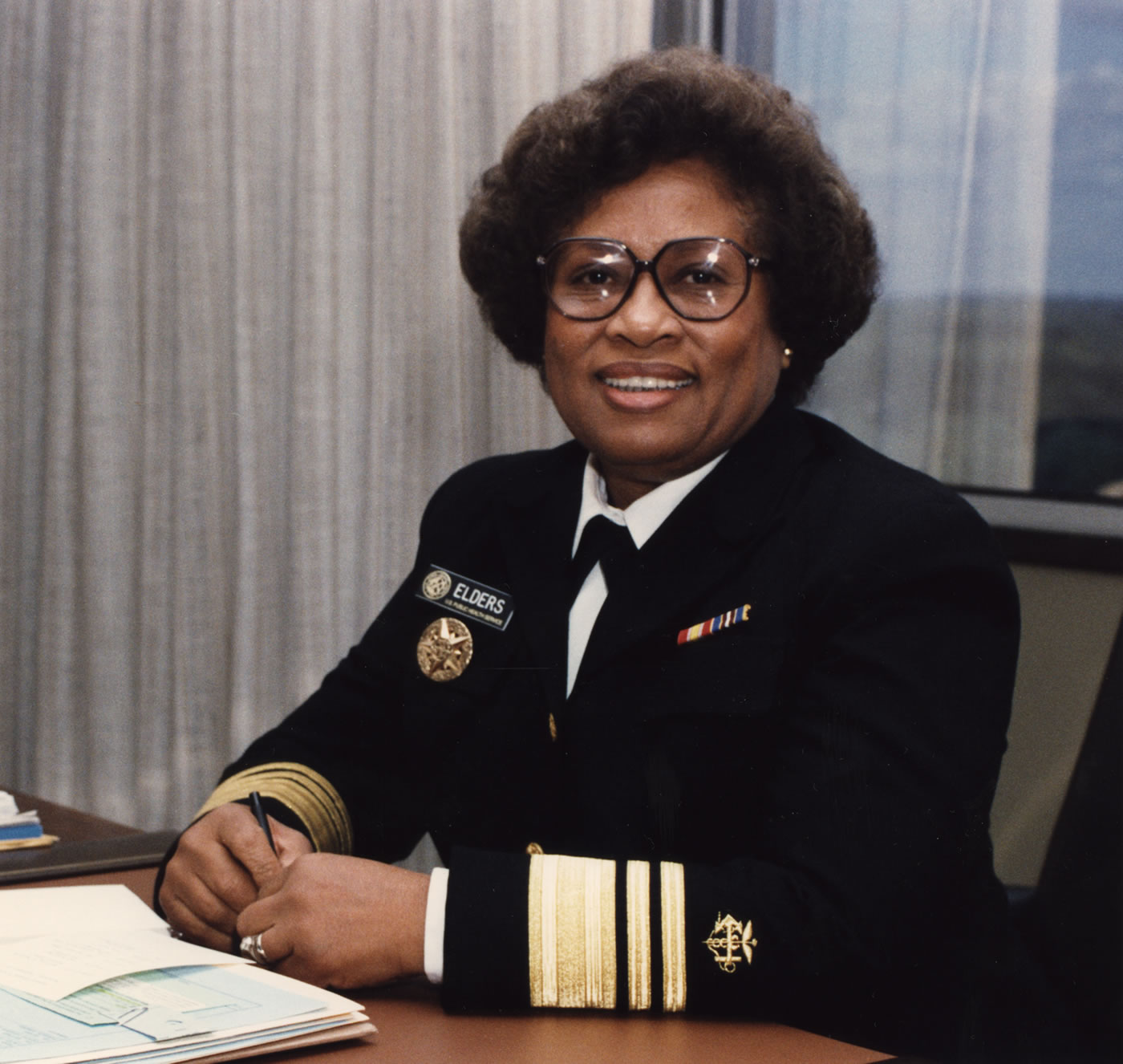
Joycelyn Elders

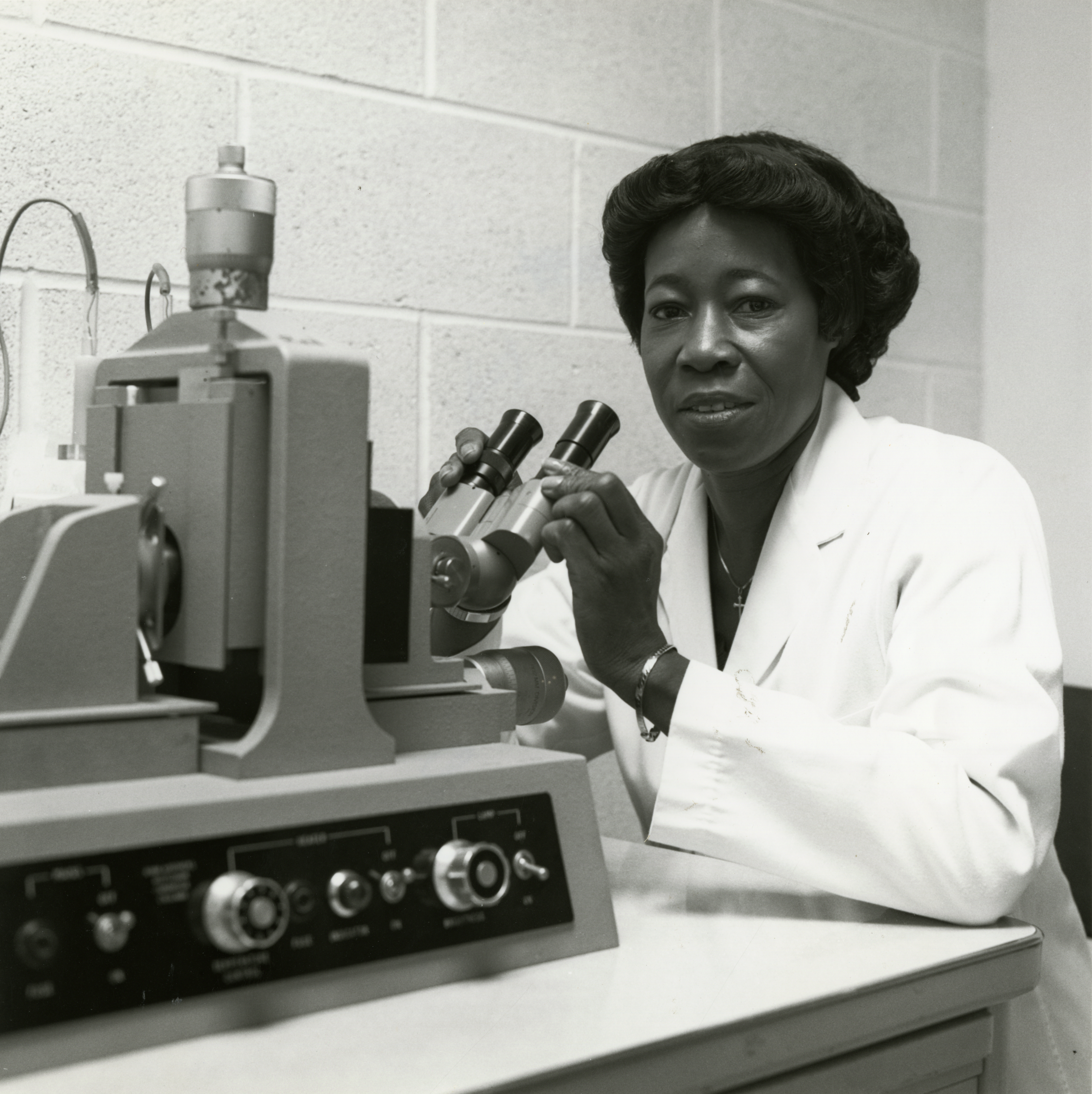
Bettye Washington Greene

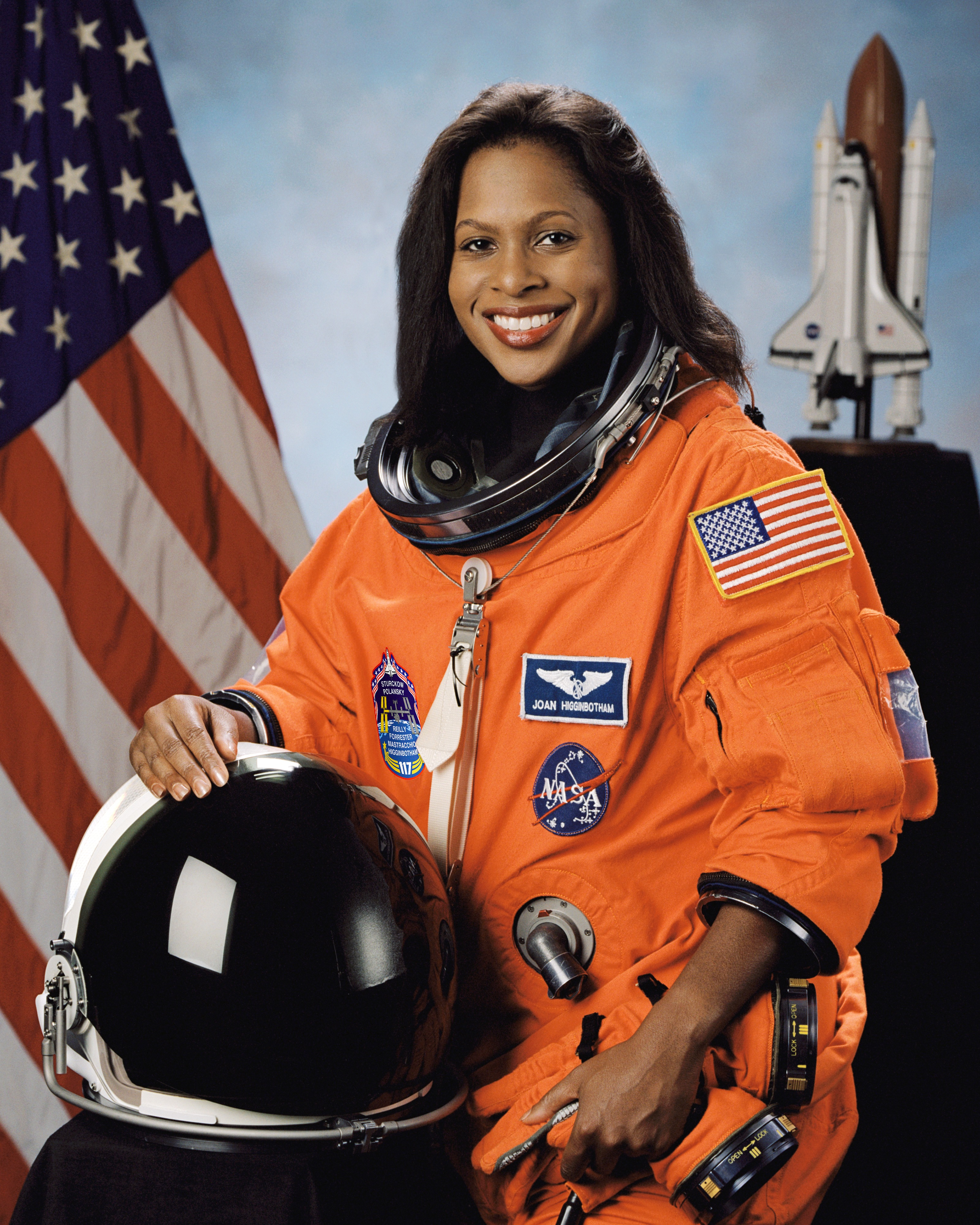
Joan Higginbotham

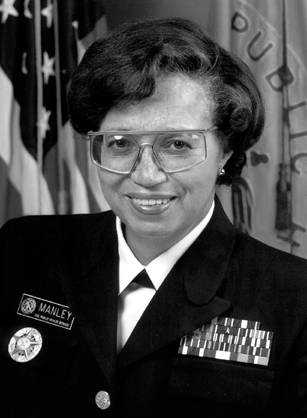
Audrey Forbes Manley

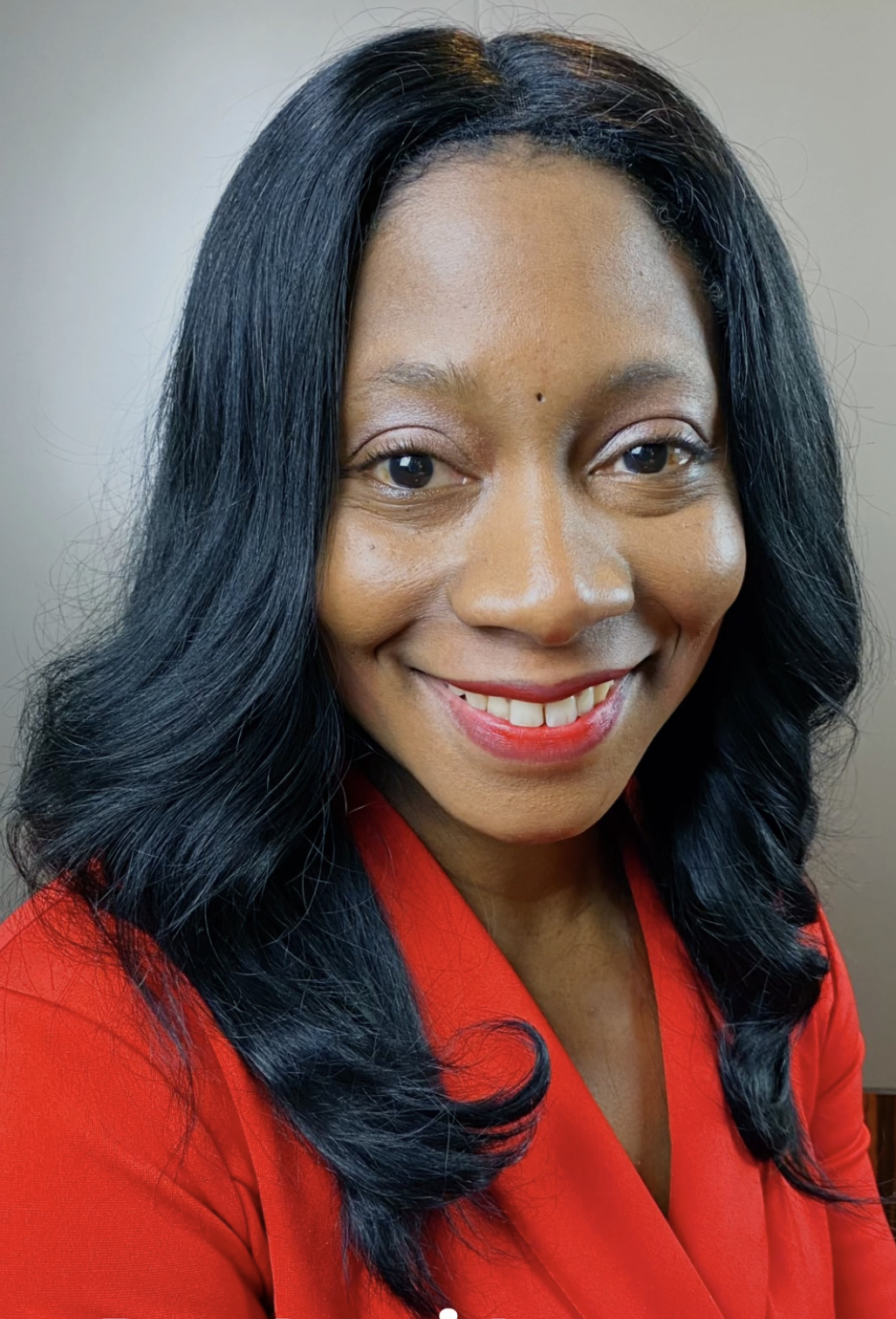
Fatima Cody Stanford

== Military ==
Name	Original chapter	Notability	Ref.
Clara Adams-Ender	Honorary	18th Chief of the U.S. Army Nurse Corps; first Army Nurse Officer to be appointed as Director of Personnel for the Surgeon General of the Army 1987–1991; held the rank of brigadier general, 1991–1993	
Hazel Winifred Johnson Brown	Honorary	First Black woman promoted to the rank and position of brigadier general in September 1979; Chief of the Army Nurse Corps	
Marcelite J. Harris	Unknown	First African American female general of the United States Air Force; first United States Air Force female aircraft maintenance officer; first female Deputy Commander for Maintenance; one of the first two female air officer commanders; Personnel Staff Officer and White House Social Aide	
Stayce D. Harris	Unknown	Highest ranking African American female in the U.S. Air Force Reserve; first African American woman to fly the Boeing 747 aircraft, the world's largest commercial aircraft	

== Nonprofits and social causes ==
Name	Original chapter	Notability	Ref.
Dorothy Pelham Beckley	Alpha	clubwoman and second national president of the Delta Sigma Theta sorority, in office from 1923 to 1926.	
Stephen R. Coney	Gamma Lambda	Founder and CEO of National Stop the Violence Alliance, Inc., a national organization geared to the promotion of nonviolence and to end violence in communities	
Marian Wright Edelman	Honorary	President and founder of the Children's Defense Fund; established and directed the NAACP Legal Defense and Education Fund Office in Jackson, Mississippi; first Black Woman admitted to the Mississippi Bar	
Clara Hale	Honorary	Also known as "Mother" Clara Hale, founder of Hale House, which provided a home to drug-addicted and abandoned babies	
Dorothy Irene Height	Rho	President of the National Council of Negro Women, administrator, educator, civil rights activist; recipient of the Congressional Gold Medal	
Lillian Roberts	Honorary	Labor leader; former U.S. Department of Labor Commissioner; first Black woman to head the New York State Labor Department	
Stacey Davis Stewart	Mu Beta	Current president and CEO, March of Dimes; former U.S. president of United Way Worldwide	
Tererai Trent	Honorary	Humanitarian, educator; holds a doctoral degree in Interdisciplinary Evaluation; principal of Tererai Trent International	

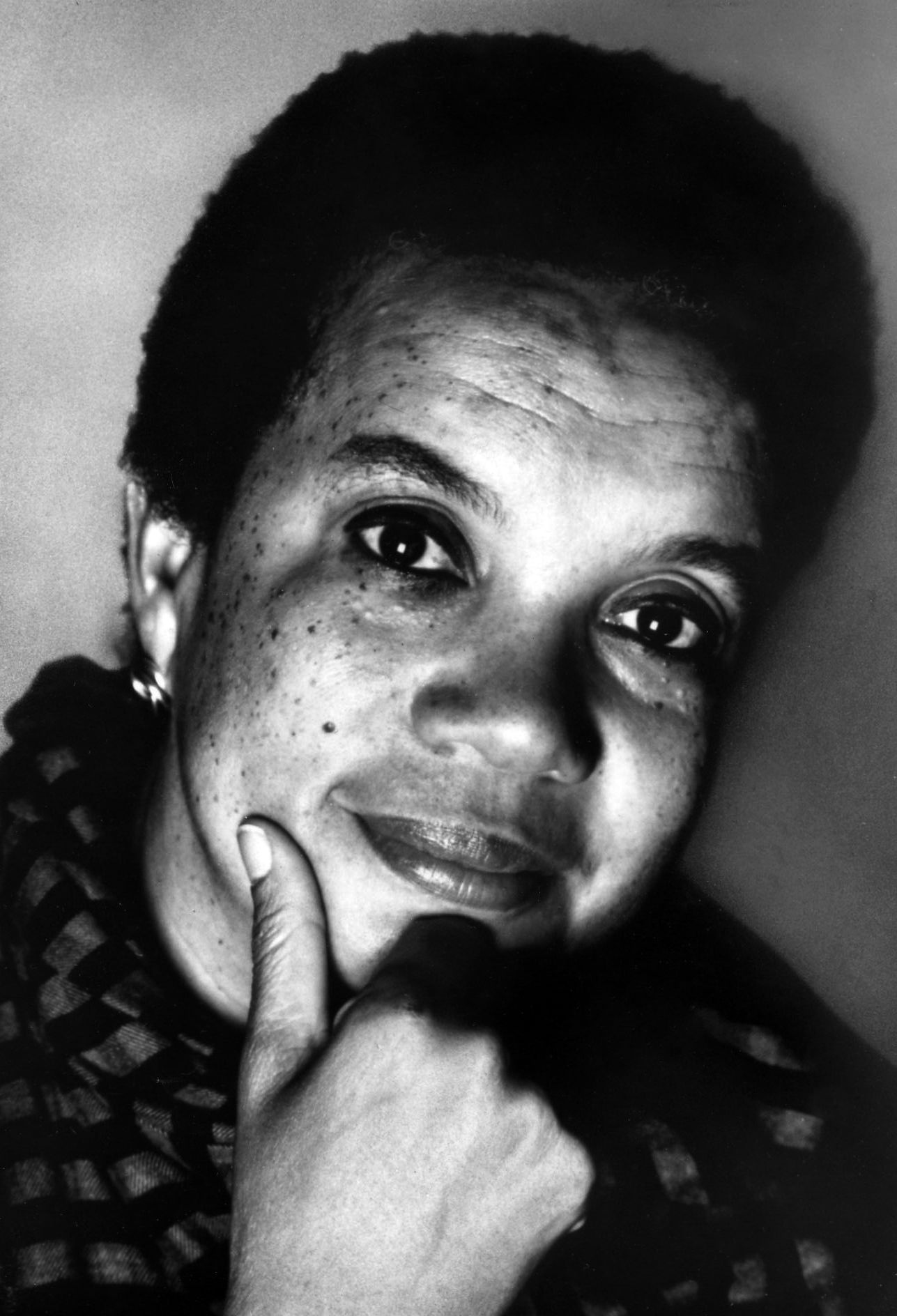
Marian Wright Edelmen

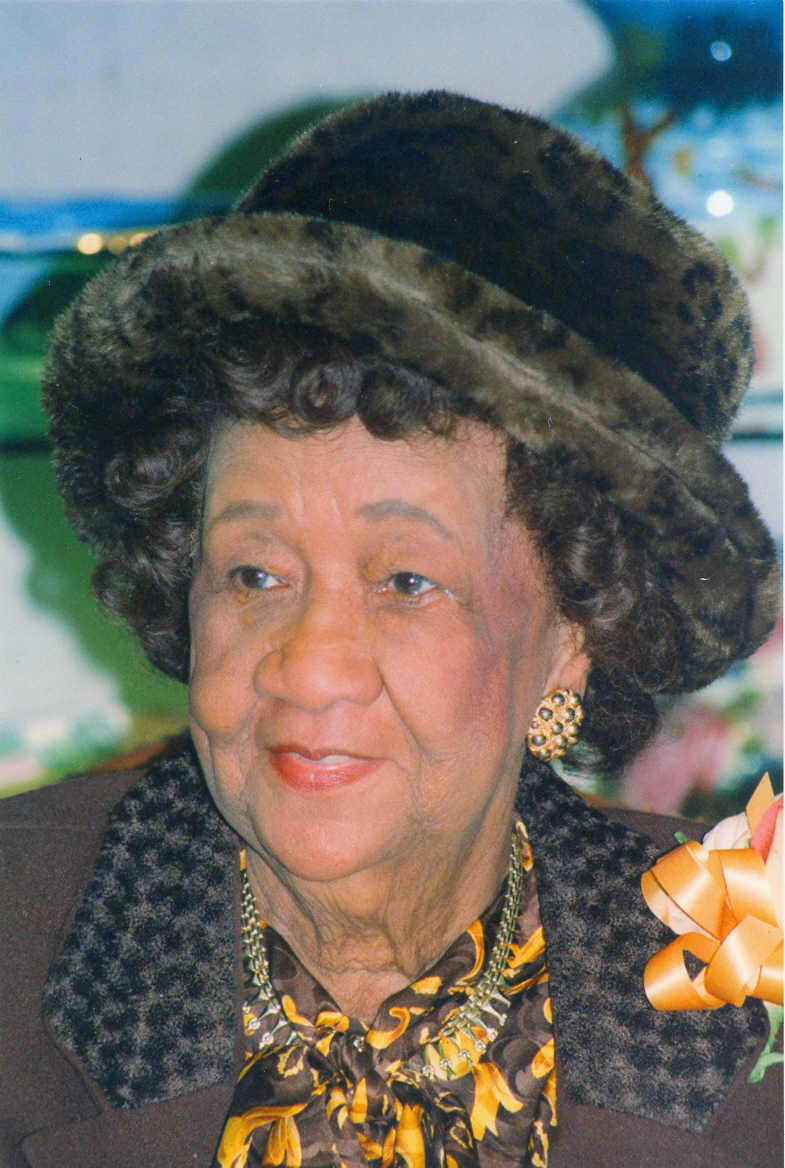
Dorothy Height

== Politics ==
=== U.S. politicians ===
Name	Original chapter	Notability	Ref.
Dixie Allen	Unknown	Former state representative for the 39th House District in Ohio (1998–2006)	
Diana Bajoie	Alpha Tau	State senator for the 5th District in Louisiana; president pro tempore of the Louisiana Senate; founder of the Louisiana Legislative Black Caucus	
Joyce Beatty	Delta Kappa	U.S. congresswoman from Ohio's 13th congressional district (2013–present)	
Keisha Lance Bottoms	Beta Alpha	60th mayor of Atlanta	
Amber Boykins	Epsilon Psi	Former Missouri state representative; youngest African American woman legislator elected in the history of the Missouri House	
Carol Moseley Braun	Honorary	First African-American female U.S. senator, represented Illinois 1992–1998	
Blondell Reynolds Brown	Philadelphia Alumnae Chapter	Current Philadelphia city councilwoman at-large; only woman to win a city-wide council seat since 2000	
Shirley Chisholm	Brooklyn Alumnae	First African-American woman elected to Congress; first African-American and first woman to run as a major party candidate for President of the United States in 1972	
Yvette Clarke	Brooklyn Alumnae	U.S. congresswoman from New York's 9th congressional district (2007–present)	
Barbara-Rose Collins	Honorary	Former U.S. congresswoman from Michigan's 15th congressional district; first African-American elected to Congress from Michigan	
Linda W. Cropp	Unknown	Former DC councilwoman At-large; former council chairwoman of the District of Columbia City Council; first female chairwoman	
Lois DeBerry	Alpha Upsilon	First African-American female speaker pro tempore for the Tennessee House of Representatives; former president emeritus of the National Black Caucus of State Legislators	
Stormie Forte	Kappa Omicron	First African-American woman and first LGBT woman to serve on the Raleigh City Council	
Shirley Franklin	Honorary	Mayor of Atlanta, Georgia	
Marcia Fudge	Epsilon	U.S. congresswoman from Ohio's 11th congressional district; former mayor of Warrensville Heights, Ohio (2000–2008); past national president of Delta Sigma Theta Sorority, Inc. (1996–2000)	
Cheryl A. Gray	Omicron Chi	Current Louisiana state senator, District 5; former member, Louisiana State House of Representatives	
Edith Green	Honorary	Former U.S. Congresswoman from Oregon's 3rd congressional district (1955–1974)	
Laura Hall	Huntsville Alumnae	State representative for 19th District of the Alabama House of Representatives since 1993; first African-American woman to represent the 19th District; former chairwoman of the Governor's Commission on AIDS	
LaDonna Harris	Honorary	Vice presidential nominee of the Citizens Party	
Tracy Maxwell Heard	Unknown	State representative for the 26th House District in Ohio	
Carolyn J. B. Howard	Unknown	Delegate, Rep. 24th Legislative District in Prince George's County, MD	
Teresa Patterson Hughes	Rho	Former Democratic assemblywoman and member of the California State Legislature	
Stephanie Tubbs Jones	Cleveland Alumnae	U.S. Congresswoman from Ohio's 11th congressional district; first Black woman to represent Ohio in the House; former chairwoman of the House Ethics Committee (since 2007); first Black woman to serve on the House Ways and Means Committee	
Barbara Jordan	Delta Gamma	U.S. congresswoman from Texas's 18th congressional district (1973–1979)	
Carolyn Cheeks Kilpatrick	Detroit Alumnae	U.S. congresswoman from Michigan's 15th congressional district (1997–2011)	
Brenda Lawrence	Southfield Alumnae Chapter	U.S. congresswoman-elect from Michigan's 14th congressional district	
Jeanne Lucas	Unknown	First African-American woman in the North Carolina General Assembly; first African-American female Senate Majority Leader in the NC General Assembly	
Carrie Meek	Beta Alpha	Former U.S. Congresswoman from Florida's 17th congressional district (1993–2003), first African-American elected to Congress from Florida since Reconstruction	
Elaine O'Neal	Alpha Lambda	First African-American woman Mayor of Durham, first woman Chief District Court Judge in North Carolina, former North Carolina Superior Court judge	
Karen Carter Peterson	New Orleans Alumnae	Democratic member of the Louisiana Senate; first chairwoman of the Louisiana Democratic Party	
Jacqueline Johnson Roberts	Pine Bluff Alumnae	Former state representative; Arkansas House of Representatives; 1991–1998	
Lottie Shackelford	Gamma Gamma	First female mayor of Little Rock, AR; vice chair of the Democratic National Committee	
Wilma Webb	Honorary	First Lady of Denver, Colorado; former member of the Colorado Legislature; the first woman of color to serve on the Colorado Joint Budget Committee; first woman to serve in the U.S. Department of Labor as the primary official for Colorado, Montana, North Dakota, South Dakota, Utah, and Wyoming	
Verda Welcome	Alpha Gamma	First African American elected to the Maryland Senate; Morgan State College, Verda Welcome Bridge	
Angela Williams	Denver Alumnae	Colorado state senator; former Colorado state representative; first African American woman to serve as Majority Caucus Chair, chairwoman of Colorado Black Democratic Legislative Caucus	
C. Bette Wimbish	Beta Alpha	First black person elected to the City Council of St. Petersburg, Florida; first black female attorney in Pinellas County; third black female attorney in the State of Florida	
Adrenne Wooten	Unknown	State representative for District 71 in Jackson, Mississippi	

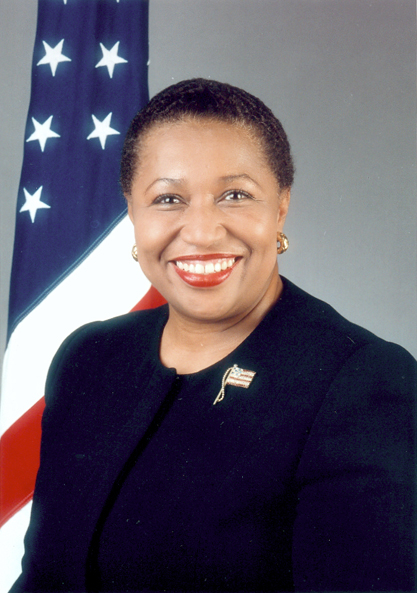
Carol Moseley Braun

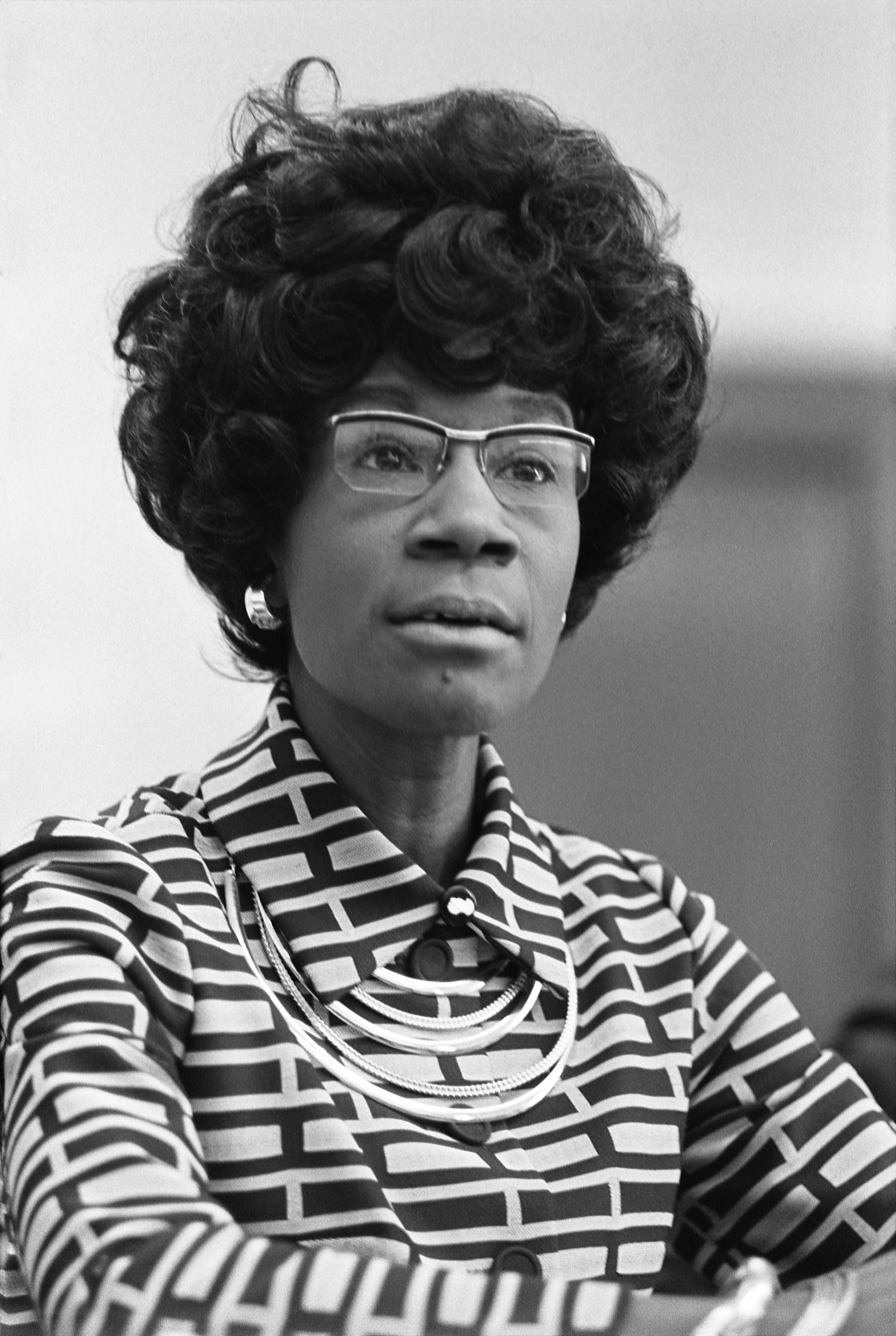
Shirley Chisholm

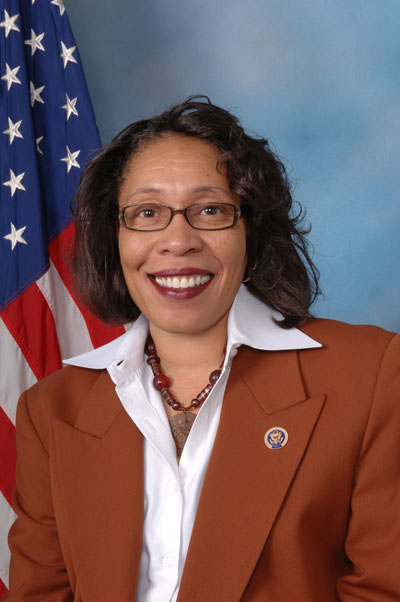
Marcia Fudge

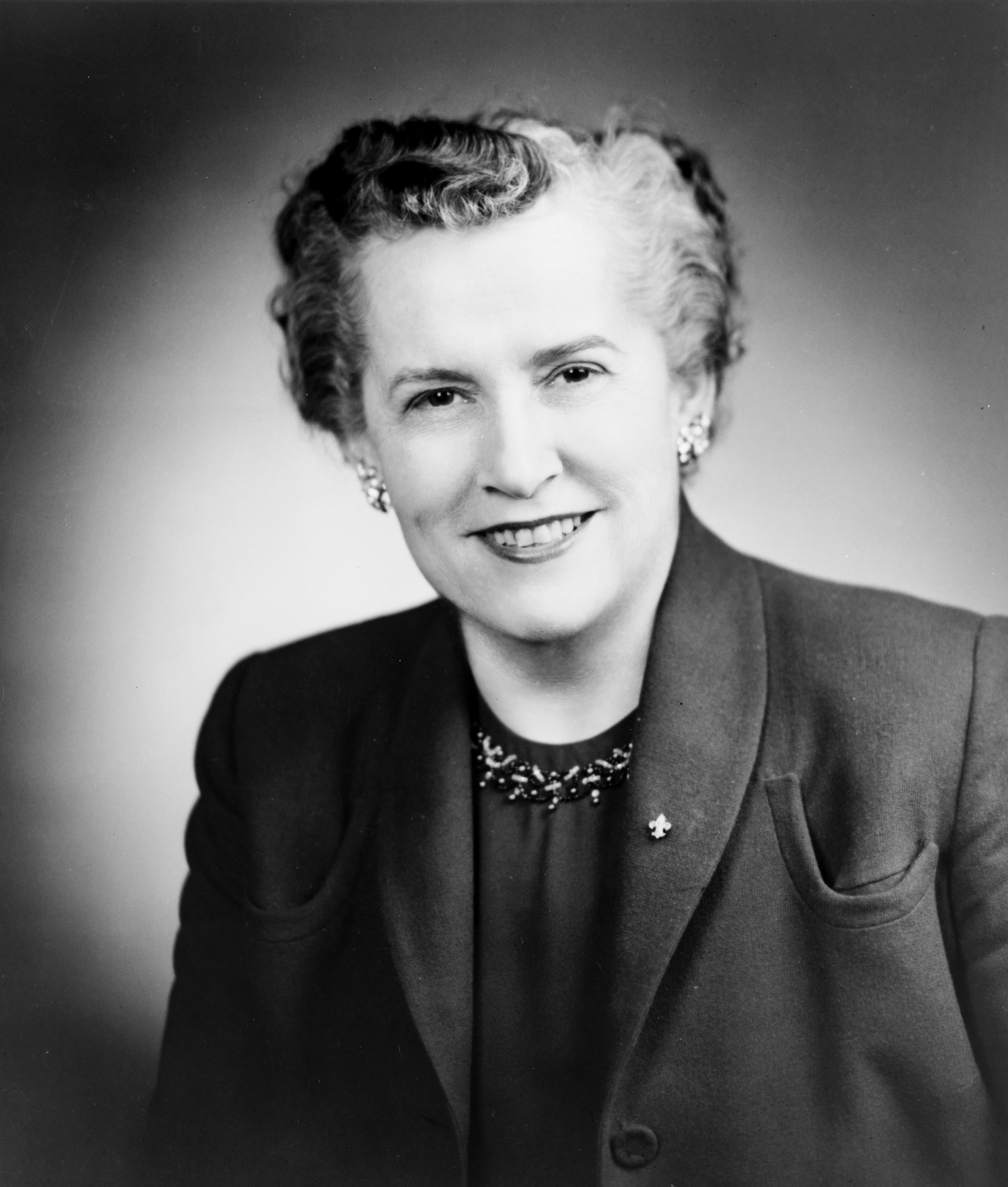
Edith Green

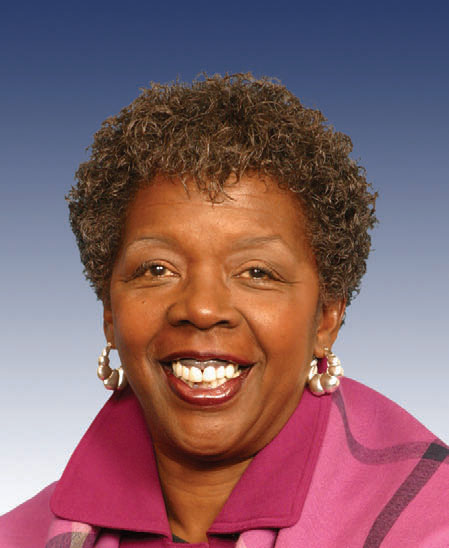
Stephanie Tubbs Jones

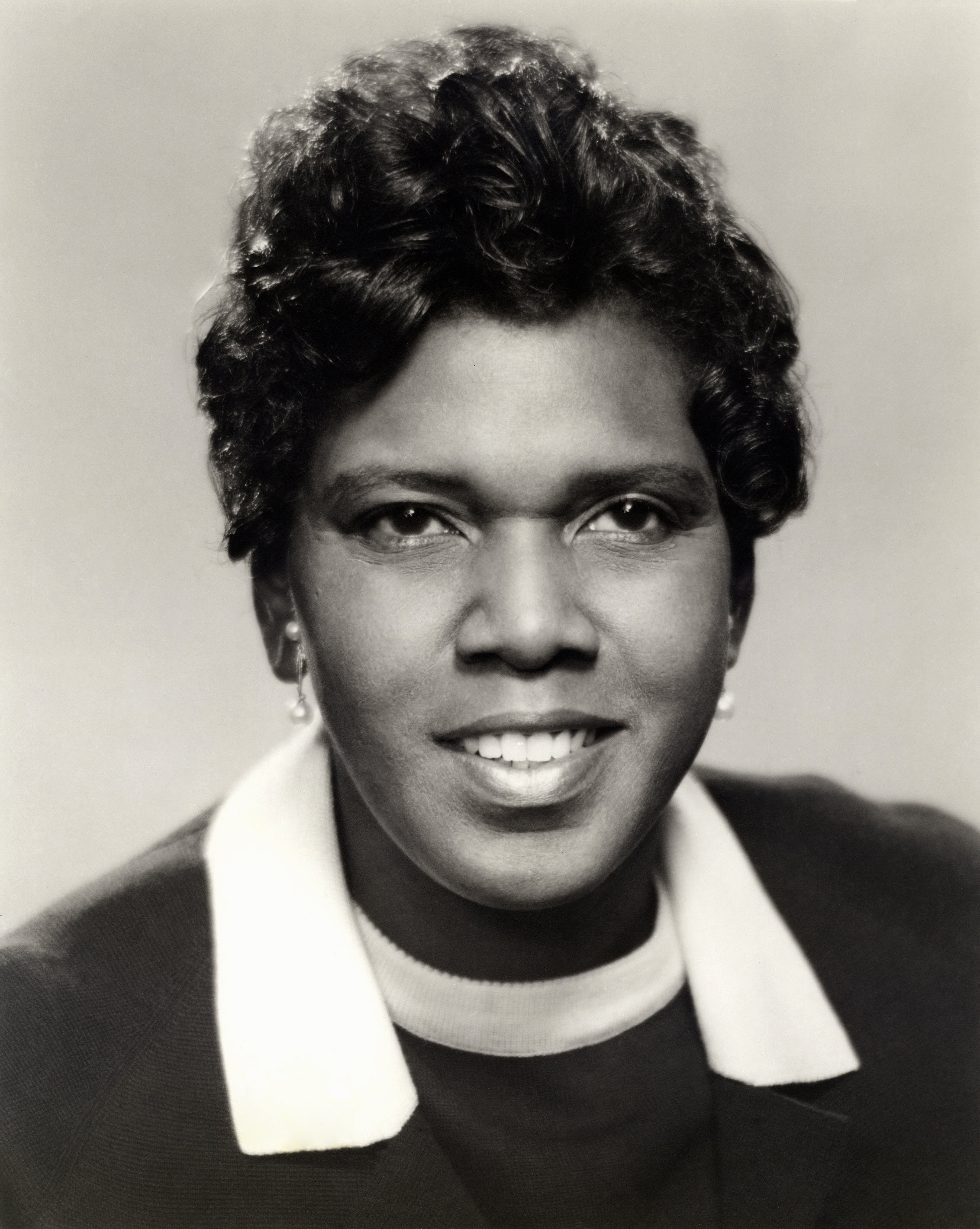
Barbara Jordan

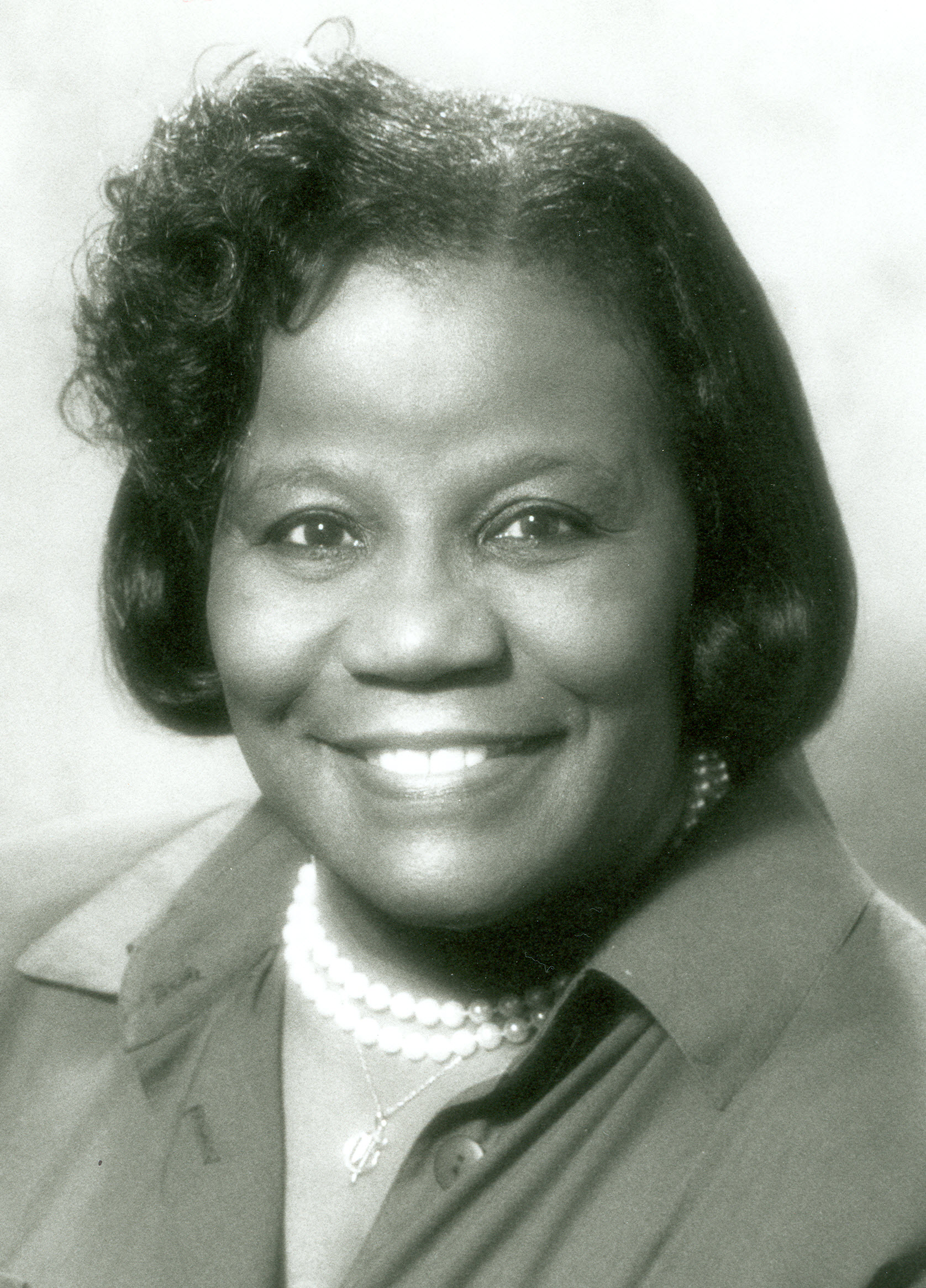
Carrie Meek

=== World leaders ===
Name	Original chapter	Notability	Ref.
Louise Jackson	Unknown	Member of Parliament, Bermuda	
Winnie Mandela	Honorary	First Black social worker in South Africa; anti-apartheid advocate; former leader of the African National Congress, Women's League, member of the ANC's National Executive Committee; ex-wife of former South African president	

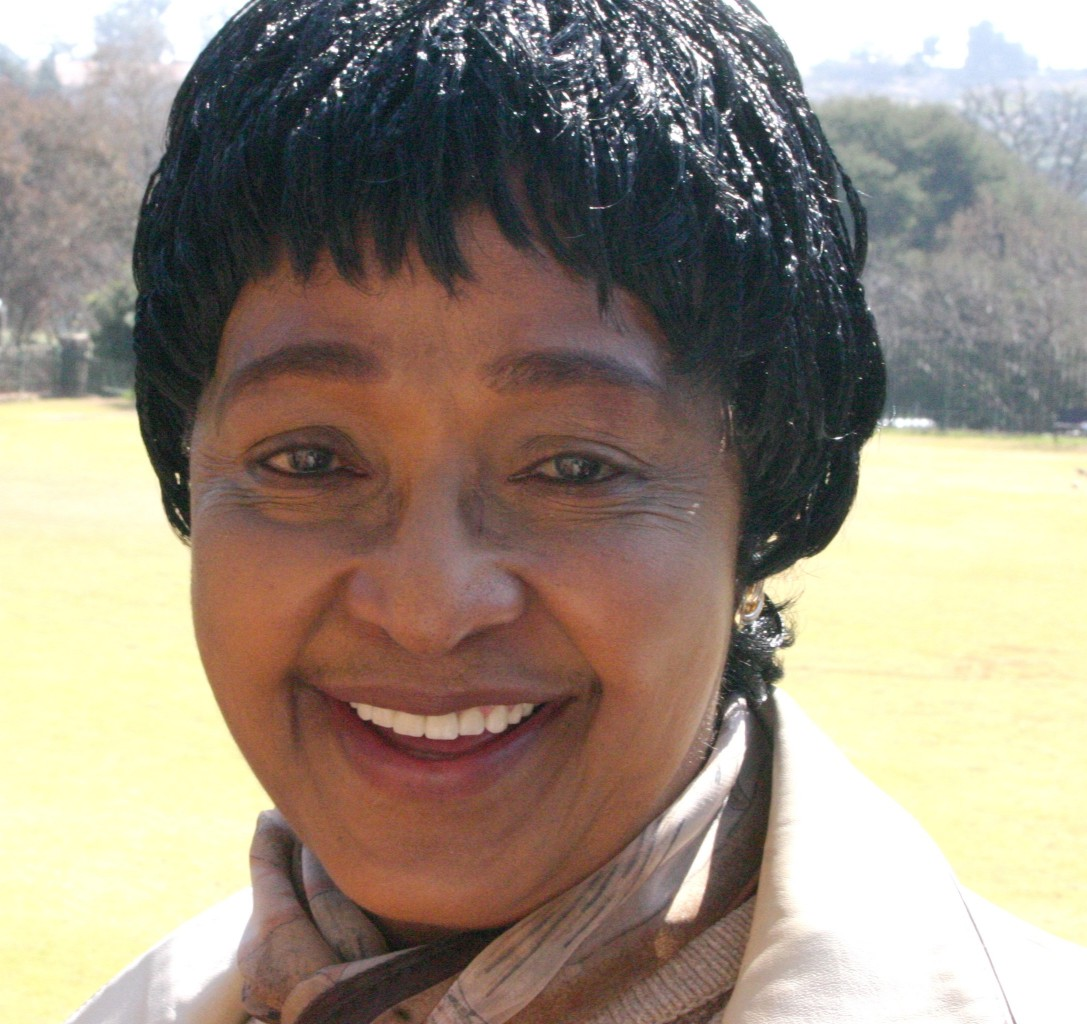
Winnie Mandela

== Religion ==
Name	Original chapter	Notability	Ref.
Suzan Johnson Cook	Honorary	United States Ambassador-at-Large for International Religious Freedom	
Vashti Murphy McKenzie	Baltimore Alumnae	First woman to become a bishop in the African Methodist Episcopal Church; National Chaplain of Delta Sigma Theta Sorority, Incorporated; granddaughter of Delta Sigma Theta founder Vashti Turley Murphy	

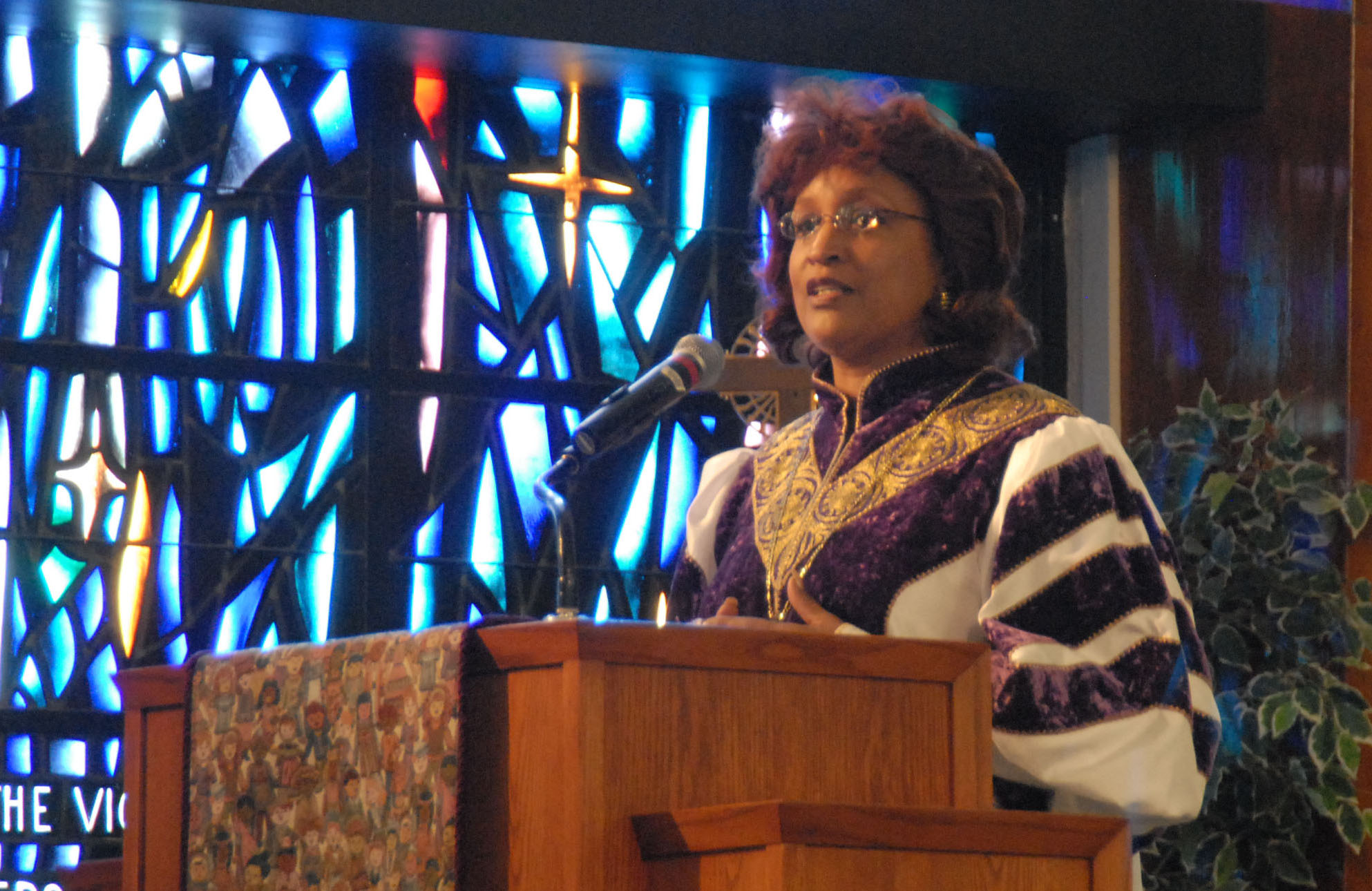
Vashti McKenzie

== Sports ==
Name	Original chapter	Notability	Ref.
Monique Ambers	Iota Kappa	Assistant Coach for the WNBA New York Liberty; former WNBA player for the Phoenix Mercury	
Tynesha Lewis	Mu Omicron	Former WNBA player for the Charlotte Sting and Minnesota Lynx	
Francena McCorory	Hampton Alumnae	2012 Olympic gold medalist, 4x400 meter relay; 2011 World Outdoor 4x400m gold medalist; American indoor 400m record holder	
Carla McGhee	Mu Zeta	Assistant Coach of Women's Basketball at Auburn University; former ABL and WNBA player; member of the 1996 Women's Basketball Olympics team that won gold in Atlanta	
Andree Pickens	Lambda Zeta	Two-time individual NCAA Champion; former captain of Alabama's NCAA Gymnastics Championship squad; former member of U.S. national gymnastics team; extra in the movie Stick It	
Wilma Rudolph	Alpha Chi	First American woman to win three gold medals in track and field at the Olympic Games	
Olympia Scott-Richardson	Omicron Chi	WNBA basketball player	
Rochelle Stevens	Memphis Alumnae	Two-time Olympic gold, silver and bronze medalist; three world championships in track and field	
Candice Wiggins	Omicron Chi	WNBA player for the Minnesota Lynx	

== See also ==
- Delta Sigma Theta
- List of Delta Sigma Theta national conventions
- List of Delta Sigma Theta alumnae chapters
- List of Delta Sigma Theta collegiate chapters
