= Kim Clark =

Kim Clark may refer to:

- Kim B. Clark (born 1949), American scholar, educator, and general authority of the Church of Jesus Christ of Latter-day Saints
- Kim Clark (candidate)(born 1959), American screenwriter and director, and candidate for congress
- Kim Berkeley Clark, American jurist

== See also ==
- Kim Clarke (born 1965, American handball player
