= Kalimah Johnson =

American social worker

Kalimah Johnson is a therapist and clinical social worker who specializes in cultural-specific holistic healing. She is the founder and executive director of the SASHA (Sexual Assault Services for Holistic Healing and Awareness) Center in Detroit, Michigan and has been influential in the #MeToo movement.

== Early life and education ==
Johnson was born in Detroit and raised on the north side of Detroit by a single mother. She dropped out of high school, then joined Job Corps in Grand Rapids, Michigan, and later enrolled in Highland Park Community College in 1986. She left community college to pursue a career in hip hop with the stage name Nikki D that was later changed to Eboni and Her Business; she signed with World One Records in 1989 and released an album titled Civilized in 1990. She began performing spoken-word poetry in 1997 and created an album titled DatsWhatImaDu for distribution by Golden Rod Records in 2005.

Johnson graduated from Wayne State University with a Bachelor of Social Work, and completed a MSW in 1997. She is a member of the Delta Sigma Theta sorority. In 2004, after conducting research on the migration of her family as slaves, she visited the plantation where they were enslaved. In 2005, a DNA test helped trace her family to the Akan people of Ghana, and she visited Ghana in 2006.

She received her Wharton School Athlete Development Professional Certification in 2016.

== Career and advocacy work ==
In 2005, she was working for the Detroit Police Department as a therapist for sexual assault survivors, and worked as a therapist and social worker in the rape counseling center of the police department for ten years.

In 2010, Johnson founded the nonprofit organization SASHA (Sexual Assault Services for Holistic Healing And Awareness) Center to offer services that include culturally-specific support groups as well as prevention and education programs. In 2020, Johnson told The Detroit News, "I developed the SASHA Center so Black women can come and tell us (how to heal); we use that and formalize it so Black women can use it from now on." According to The Detroit News, SASHA "developed a model known as the Black Women's Triangulation of Rape, which highlights barriers Black women face when sexually assaulted, including stereotyping, oversexualizing, cultural appropriation and systemic barriers." Johnson founded SASHA to address these barriers. A final version of the Triangulation of Rape Model was released in 2018, after Johnson consulted with community members and received input from people on social media.

She has worked as an assistant professor for the Social Work Department at Marygrove College and been a poet in residence for the Detroit Symphony Orchestra.

Johnson has also worked as a consultant for professional sports organizations to educate athletes about relationships, domestic violence, and sexual assault, and is a consultant for the National Basketball Association. As a consultant, Johnson worked with NBA commissioner Adam Silver in 2014, after Charlotte Hornets player Jeffery Taylor pleaded guilty in a domestic violence case.

Johnson appears in the 2017 documentary I Am Evidence that followed untested rape kit investigations across the United States.

Johnson was an early organizer of #MuteRKelly protests, and in 2018, in response to a long history of sexual abuse and assault allegations against R Kelly, she co-organized a #MuteRKelly protest outside of the Detroit Little Caesars Arena to protest rape culture and sexual violence. At a news conference, Johnson stated, "Black girls do matter, and black girls do have a voice and black girls need more visibility around sexual abuse and assault, and that's why we're here. We're here to have that conversation."

Johnson is also a natural hair stylist. She founded the natural hair care salon, PicNap, LLC, to provide natural hair care and wellness services. In 2008, Johnson published Locs for Life: The Root to Well Being for African American Women, a guide to hair locking, including social, emotional, and spiritual aspects.

== Honors and awards ==
- 2019 Activist Impact Award at the Breakthrough Inspiration Awards, Breakthrough
- 2020 Michiganian of the Year by The Detroit News, for founding the SASHA Center

== Published works ==
- Sexual Violence in the Lives of Black Women (VAWAnet. Violence Against Women Act, 2013)
- I am Detroit. The Voice of Social Workers (NASW Press, 2011)
- Get it Together Sugar! (D-Life Online Magazine, 2019–present)
- Locs for Life: The Root to Well Being for African American Women (AuthorHouse Press, 2008)
- A Decade of Change, Michigan's Strategic Plan for Sexual Violence Prevention (2006)
- An Exploration of Gangster Rap and its Impact on the Violence Against Women Movement. (The Advocate, 2006)
- Effects of DV on Children (Detroit Police Department Domestic Violence Unit, 2005)
- Rape Counseling Center, Information Brochure (Detroit Police Department, 2004)
- RAPE Poem (Turning Point Newsletter, 2003)
- Women Who Survive (PicNap Press, 2000)
