= Jacqueline Roberts =

American politician (born 1944)

Member of the Arkansas House of Representatives from the 73rd district

Personal details
- Born: April 30, 1944 (age 82)
- Party: Democratic
- Profession: Politician

Jacqueline Roberts (born April 30, 1944) is a former state legislator from Arkansas. She served in the Arkansas House of Representatives between 1991 and 1998. She belonged to the African Methodist Episcopal (A.M.E.) church.
