= Nicole Lamb-Hale =

American lawyer

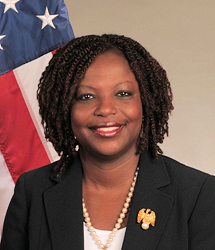
- Nicole Lamb-Hale
- Born: Detroit, Michigan
- Education: University of Michigan (BA); Harvard Law School (JD)
- Occupations: Assistant Secretary of Commerce for Manufacturing and Services

Nicole Yvette Lamb-Hale formerly served as Assistant Secretary of Commerce for Manufacturing and Services. She was confirmed by the United States Senate on February 11, 2010. Prior to being confirmed as Assistant Secretary, she served as Deputy General Counsel of the United States Commerce Department. Currently, she is vice president, Chief Legal Officer and Corporate Secretary for Cummins.

== Life and work ==
Lamb-Hale was born in Detroit, Michigan. She received her B.A. with high honors from the University of Michigan in 1988 and her J.D. from Harvard Law School in 1991.

Before beginning her government service, Lamb-Hale was an equity partner in two international law firms where she specialized in business restructuring and public finance. She joined the law firm of Foley & Lardner in Detroit, and served as managing partner of the firm's Detroit office.

She was a presidential appointee to the U.S. Department of Commerce as the Deputy General Counsel and performed duties as the Chief Operating Officer of that office.

Another presidential appointment named her Assistant Secretary for Manufacturing and Services in the U.S. Department of Commerce's International Trade Administration (ITA). As the ITA Chief Executive Officer, she connected U.S. industry with the federal government it ease access to international markets for U.S. exports.

At Cummins, she takes responsibility for the company's legal matters around the world and oversees teams of attorneys and legal professionals.

She is a life member of Delta Sigma Theta sorority; a member of The Links, Incorporated; and a member of Jack & Jill of America. In addition, Lamb-Hale served as a member of President Barack Obama's National Finance Committee and was a co-chair and Deputy General Counsel of the Michigan Campaign for Change. She was also selected as one of the 50 Black Women Over 50.
