= Kim Berkeley Clark =

American attorney and judge

Kim Berkeley Clark is an American jurist. She has served as a senior judge on the Fifth Judicial District Court of Pennsylvania (The Allegheny County Court of Common Pleas). She was previously the President Judge of the Court.

Clark made national headlines in February 2020 when a judge under her supervision used a racial epithet to describe an African-American juror who served on a jury that acquitted a drug dealer, according to NBC News. Clark removed the judge from the bench.

She was appointed by Pennsylvania Governor Tom Ridge in 1999, elected to a full ten-year term that same year and reelected to ten-year terms in 2009 and 2019. Prior to her appointment in 1999, Clark served as Assistant and Deputy District Attorney in Allegheny County, Pennsylvania.
