= Fortitude (King) =

Artwork by James King

- Lady Fortitude
- Artist: James King (sculptor)
- Year: 1979
- Type: Metal
- Dimensions: 384.048 cm × 365.76 cm (151.200 in × 144.00 in)
- Location: Washington, D.C., United States; 38°55′18.8″N 77°1′7.62″W
- Owner: Howard University

Fortitude (also known as Lady Fortitude) is a public artwork by the American artist James King, located in Fortitude Plaza at Howard University in Washington, D.C., United States. Fortitude was originally surveyed as part of the Smithsonian's Save Outdoor Sculpture! survey in 1993.

== Description ==
The sculpture depicts a figure of a woman cut from a thin piece of metal. She "wears" a sleeveless dress, high heels and has short, straight hair. She is walking; with her proper left arm swinging above her head and her proper right arm back behind her.

== Artist ==
Born in Chicago, sculptor James King received education from the Art Institute of Chicago, the Goethe-Institut and the University of Vienna.

== Information ==
The sculpture in its context, in 2010

The sculpture was unveiled on April 28, 1979, at 3:15 p.m. by members of Delta Sigma Theta, to honor the founders of the service sorority. The sculpture is described as symbolizing "the attributes of strength, courage, hope, wisdom, beauty and femininity as depicted by the 22 founders of Delta Sigma Theta". In 1986, the sorority gifted small versions of Fortitude to Winnie Mandela, Leah Tutu and Dorothy Boesak.

On July 11, 2013, the sorority dedicated Fortitude Plaza, surrounding the sculpture, as a gift to Howard University. The Plaza was designed by four female architectural students at Howard University. The design was based on the original landscape work of David Williston, who designed the space in 1932.

== Condition ==
This sculpture was surveyed in 1993 for its condition and was described, as "well maintained".
