= Madree Penn White =

American suffragist (1892–1967)

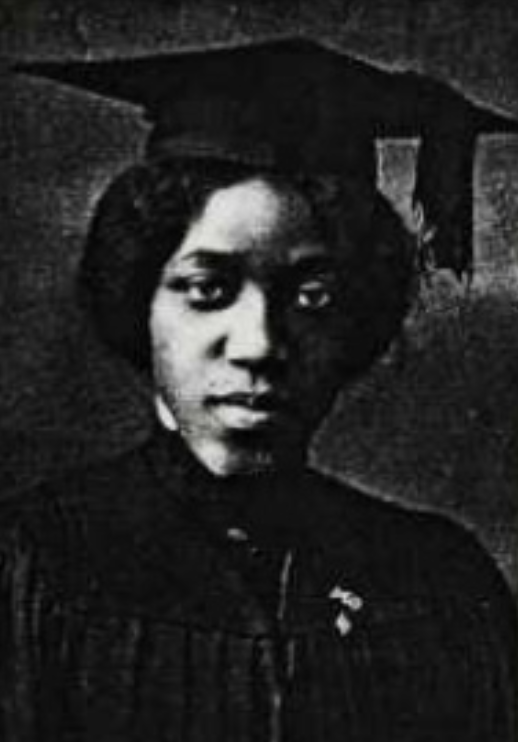
- Madree Penn White, from the 1914 yearbook of Howard University
- Born: Madree Penn; November 21, 1892; Atchison, Kansas
- Died: January 31, 1967 (aged 74); Shaker Heights, Ohio
- Occupations: Editor, educator, suffragist, businesswoman
- Known for: One of the founders of Delta Sigma Theta

Madree Penn White (November 21, 1892 – January 31, 1967) was an American editor, educator, businesswoman, club woman, and suffragist. She was one of the founders of Delta Sigma Theta, and the sorority's second president.

== Early life ==
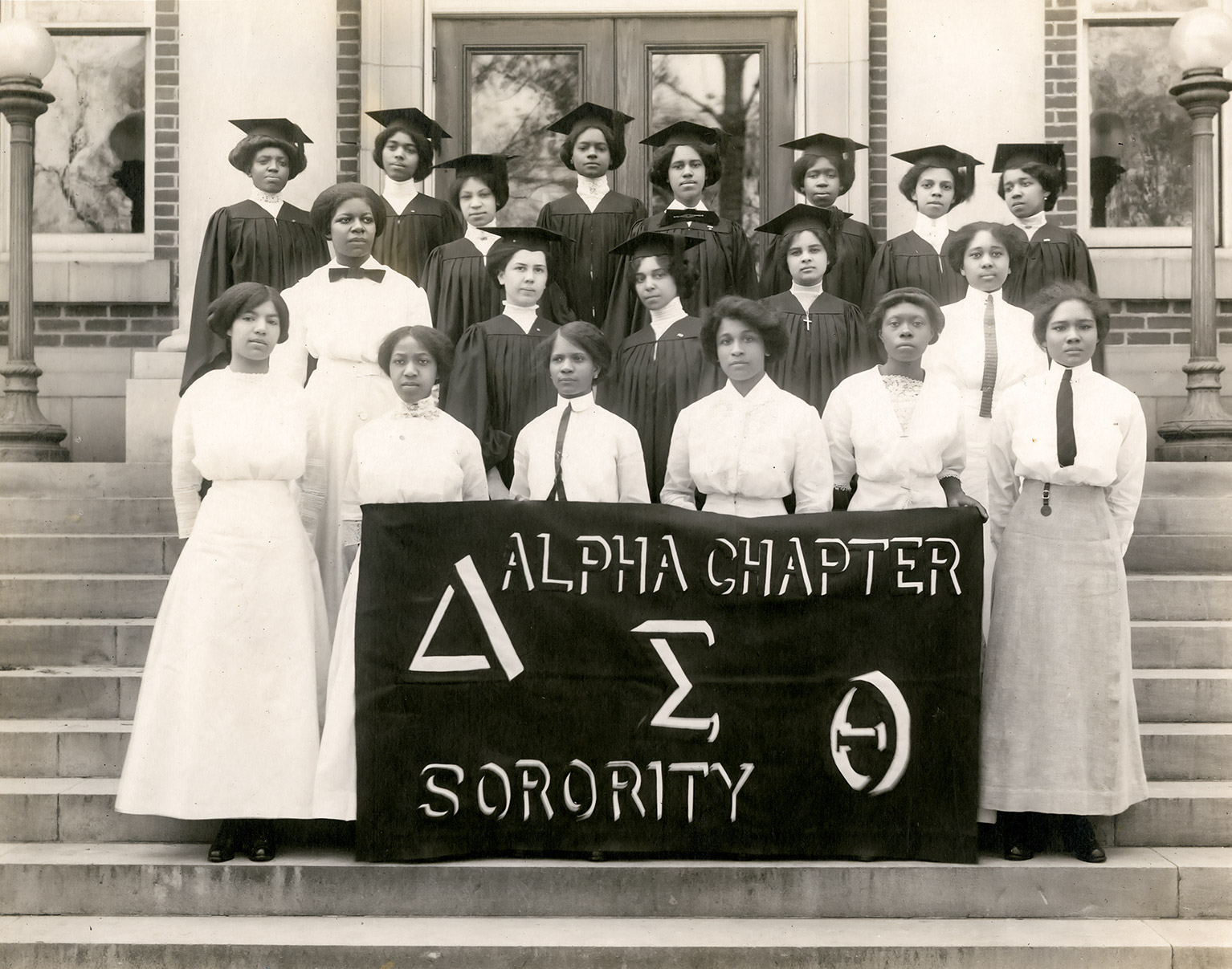
Delta Sigma Theta founders, 1913, at Howard University. Madree Penn: Front row, second from left.

Madree Penn was born in Atchison, Kansas, and grew up in Omaha, Nebraska. Her parents were Mattie (née Gordon) and John Penn. In 1908, she took second prize in an essay contest about the work of Robert Burns. In 1909, she represented the Literary and Historical Society of Omaha in an oratory contest, with a speech titled "Standard Bearers". She graduated from Central High School in Omaha in 1909.

Penn graduated from Howard University in 1914. At Howard, she was the first "elected" associate woman editor of the school newspaper and was an officer of the campus YWCA and NAACP chapters. She was one of the 22 founding members of the Delta Sigma Theta sorority. In 1914, she won first prize in a scholarship contest held by the National League on Urban Conditions Among Negroes.

== Career ==
Penn was president of the Kaffir Chemical Laboratories in Omaha. She was associate editor of the Omaha Monitor. She owned and managed a printing company, Triangle Press Company, in St. Louis, Missouri. She taught Latin at the National Training School for Women and Girls in Washington, D.C., and taught at the Tucker Business College and Douglas University. She was active in the League of Women Voters.

== Club woman ==
Penn was executive secretary of the YWCA in Charlotte, North Carolina. She was associate editor of the Howard University Alumni Journal.

In 1963, White led a Delta Sigma Theta contingent in the March on Washington with several other civil rights groups. In 1966, she was honored by the Cleveland chapter of the League of Women Voters, for her participation in the 1913 inauguration of Woodrow Wilson and her work on a committee headed by Carrie Chatman Catt.

== Personal life ==
Penn married physician James Eathel White, and had two children. They divorced in 1930. She died in Shaker Heights, Ohio, on January 31, 1967, aged 74 years.
