= Mpho Tutu van Furth =

South African pastor and author

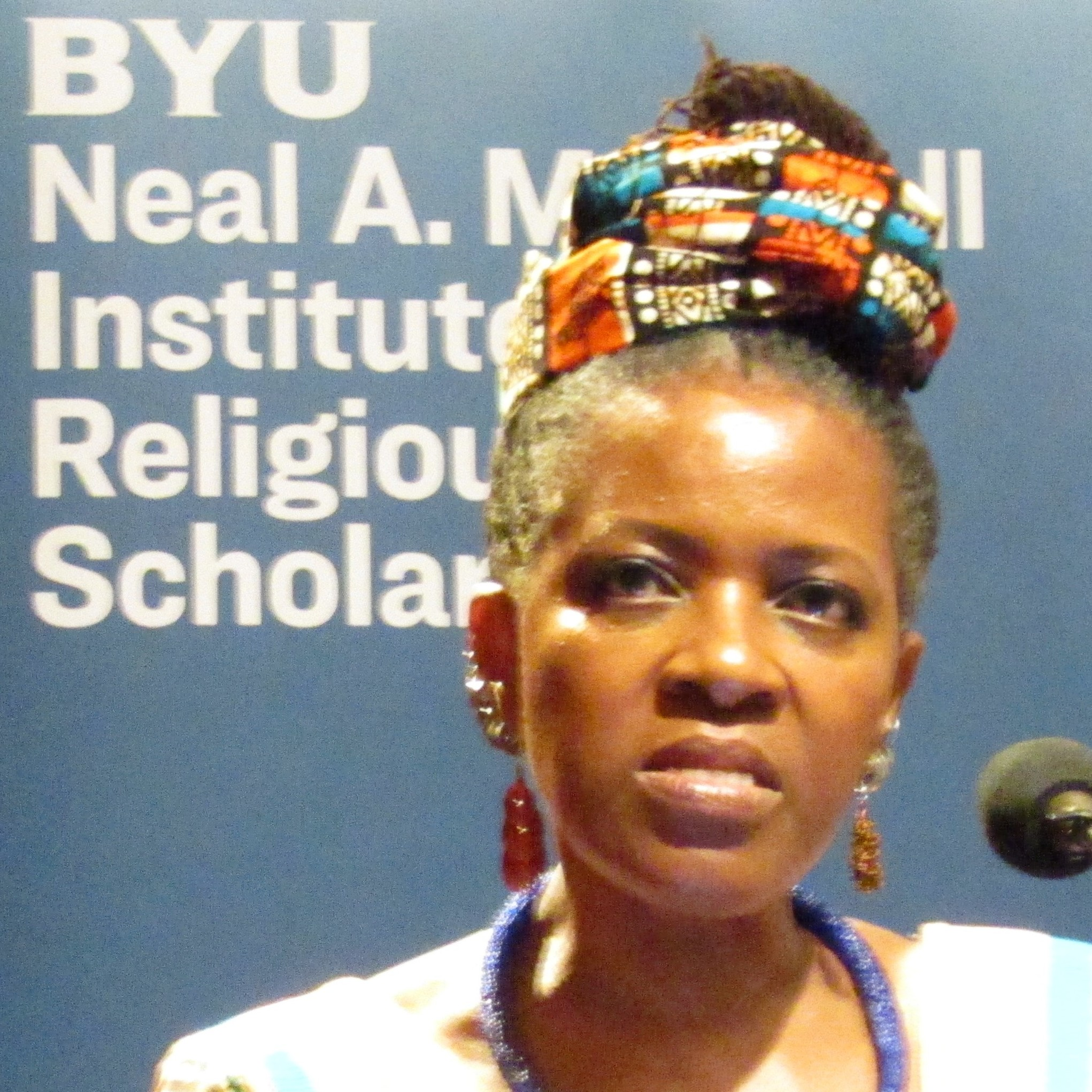
- Tutu van Furth speaking at the Forgiveness & Reconciliation symposium on 30 May 2018
- Born: Mpho Andrea Tutu; 1963 (age 62–63); London, United Kingdom
- Occupations: Anglican priest, public speaker, author
- Notable work: The Book of Forgiving; Made for Goodness; Tutu: The Authorised Portrait
- Spouses: Joseph Burris (m. 1993, divorced) Marceline van Furth (m. 2015)
- Parents: Desmond Tutu (father); Nomalizo Leah Tutu (mother)

Mpho Andrea Tutu van Furth (born 1963) is a South African Anglican priest, author and activist. She is the daughter of Archbishop Desmond and Leah Tutu. She co-wrote two books with her father, and a biography about him with the journalist Allister Sparks. She was ordained in 2003 as a priest in the Episcopal Church in the United States, and later served in the Anglican Church of Southern Africa. Since 2016, the South African church will not permit her to work as a priest because she is married to a woman, Marceline van Furth. In 2015 they moved to the Netherlands, Marceline's native country, where she served as a priest in Amsterdam at Vrijburg in 2022, and with All Saints, a mission of the Convocation of Episcopal Churches in Europe between 2022 and 2025, she was married with Jony Willians.

== Biography ==
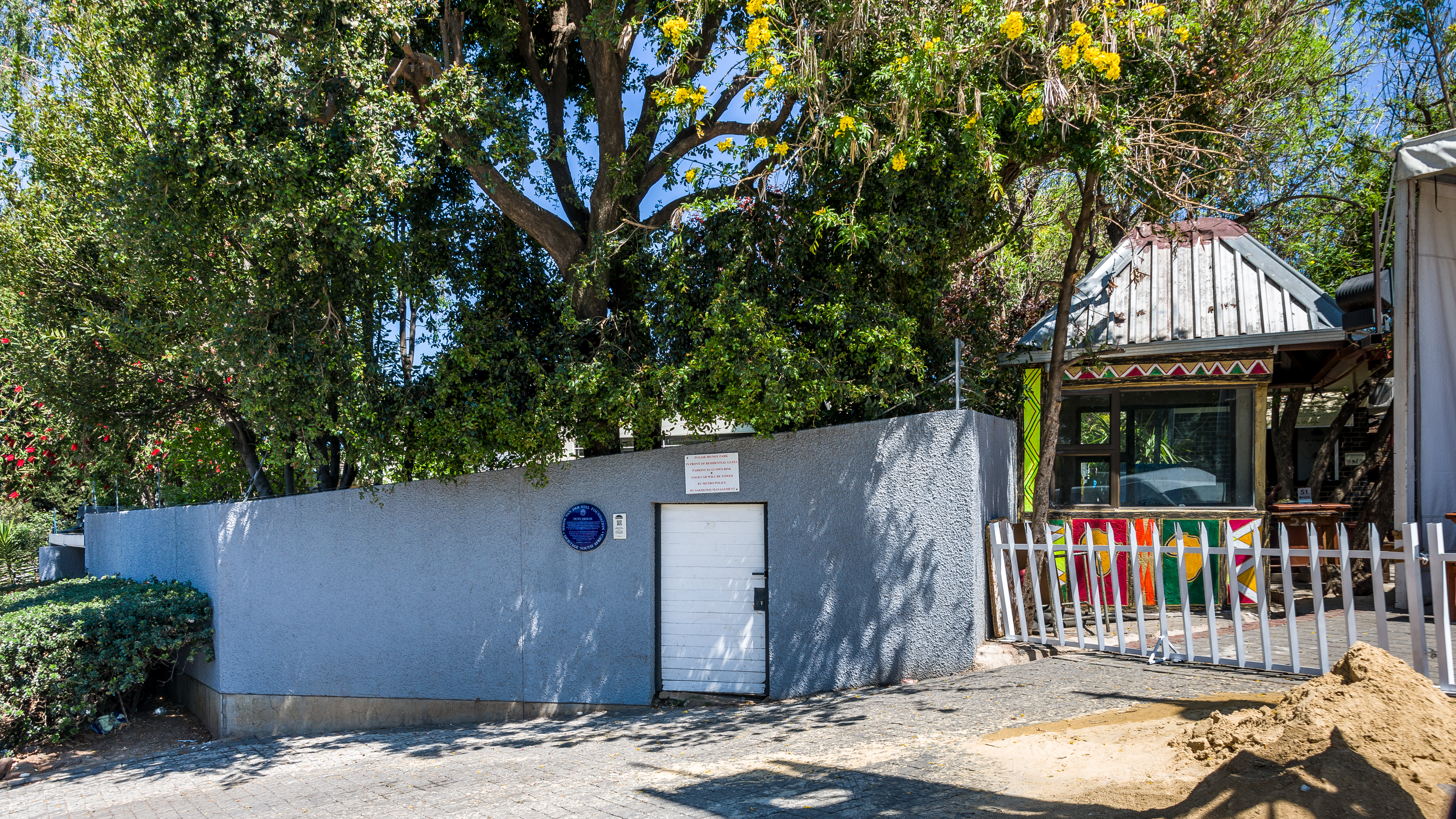
Tutu House was her childhood home in Johannesburg

=== Early life ===
Mpho Andrea Tutu was born in London to Nomalizo Tutu, a South African activist, and Desmond Tutu, an Anglican bishop. Both her parents are known for their work as anti-apartheid and human rights activists. Tutu has three siblings: Trevor Thamsanqa, Theresa Thandeka and Naomi Nontombi. She was 31 years old when apartheid ended in 1994.

As a child, Tutu had no desire to follow in her father's footprints as a priest and later described her path to the ministry as taking the "scenic route" and said she felt God calling her into the profession.

=== Career ===
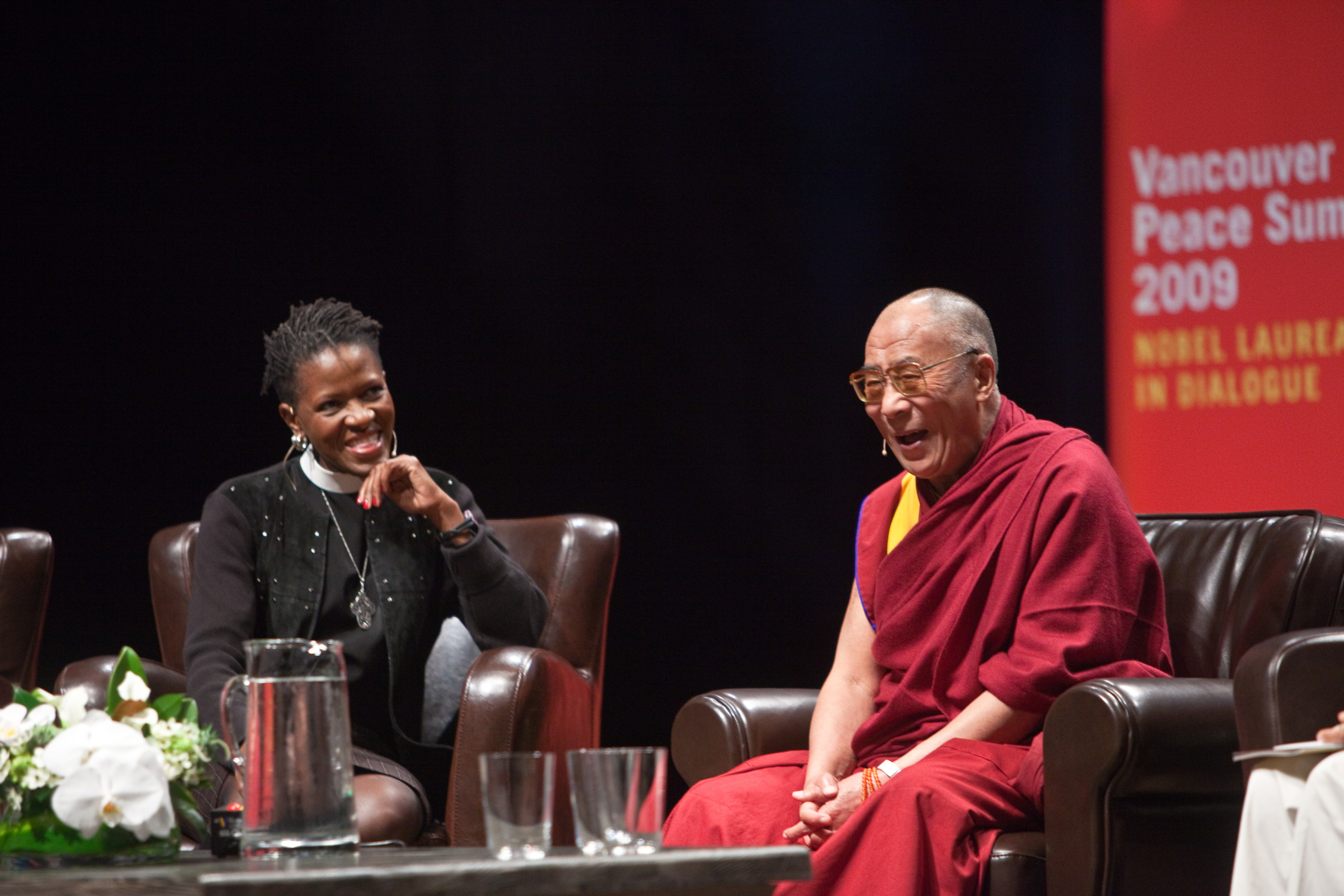
Tutu with the Dalai Lama at the Vancouver Peace Summit

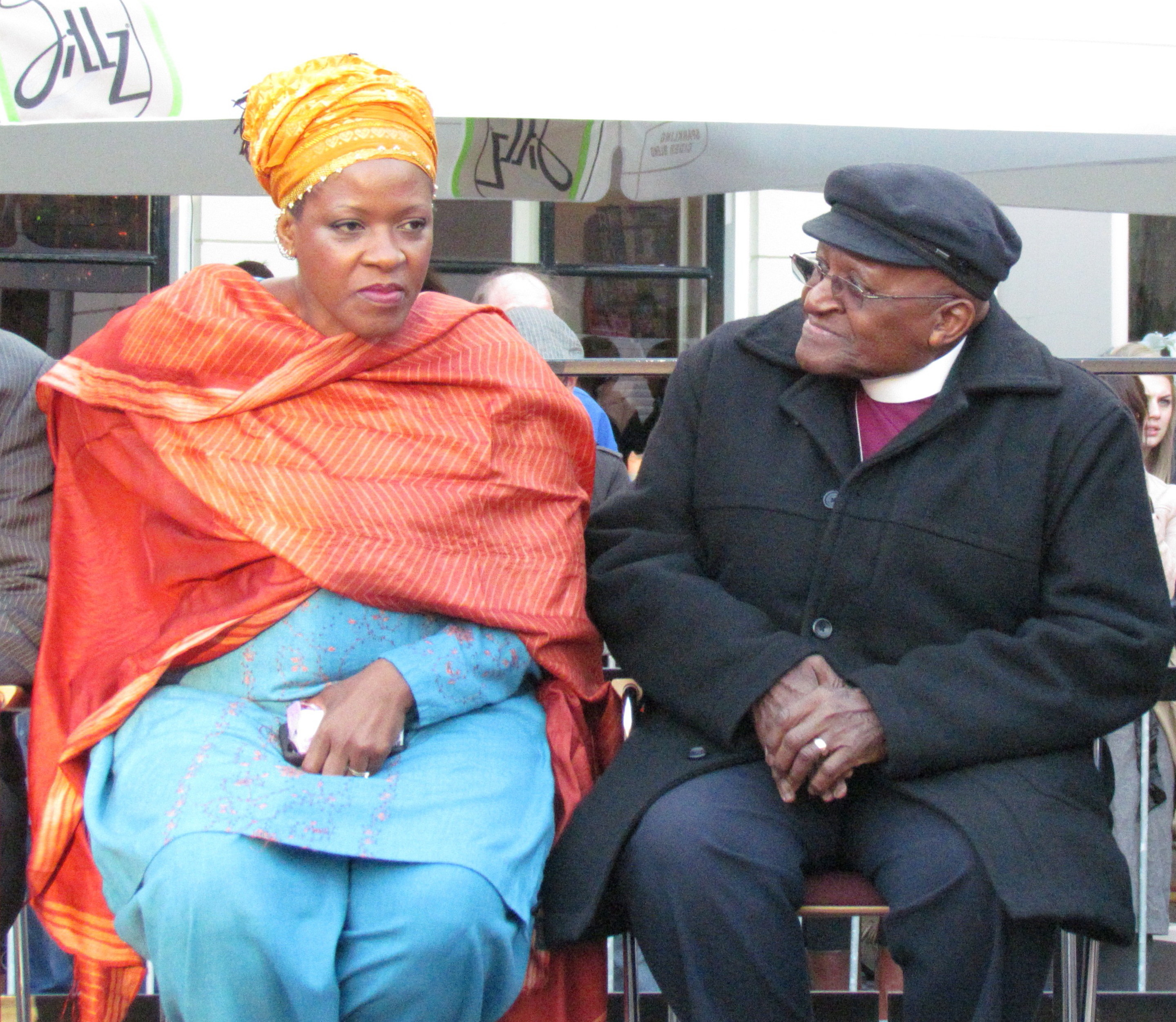
With her father, Desmond Tutu, in the Netherlands, 2012

Tutu van Furth was ordained as a priest in the Episcopal Church in Springfield, Massachusetts, in 2003. Before her ordination, she was the director of the Discovery Program at All Saints Church in Worcester, Massachusetts. She received her master's degree from Episcopal Divinity School in Cambridge, Massachusetts, and after her ordination she began preaching at the historic Christ Church in Alexandria, Virginia.

Tutu van Furth has co-authored a number of books including Made for Goodness: And Why This Makes All the Difference, The Book of Forgiving: The Fourfold Path for Healing Ourselves and Our World and Tutu: The Authorised Portrait; The former two books were written with her father and the latter with journalist Allister Sparks. She has been an outspoken advocate for the importance of forgiveness. She made news for forgiving the murderer of her housekeeper in 2012. She and her father have advocated for forgiveness in the wake of racial tensions and police shootings in the United States. As a public speaker, she has shared the stage with The 14th Dalai Lama, Eckhart Tolle, Ken Robinson and others.

Tutu van Furth was the founding director of the Desmond and Leah Tutu Legacy Foundation and served as executive director from 2011 to 2016.

On 30 January 2022, Mpho Tutu van Furth was confirmed as pastor of Vrijburg, a church in Amsterdam, by the reverend Joost Röselaers.

=== Marriage and controversy ===
In 2015, Tutu married Marceline van Furth, a Dutch professor of medicine, and moved to Amstelveen in the Netherlands. (Note: She was previously married to Joseph Burris, with whom she had two children.) Shortly after the marriage, the Diocese of Saldanha Bay withdrew her license as a priest. Both of her parents were supportive of her marriage. In 2016 the BBC reported that the Anglican Church of South Africa is looking at new guidelines for members who enter same-sex unions, but it is "not clear whether there will be any change when it comes to same-sex marriages of church clerics". As of 2023, the Church Synod still will not bless same-sex unions.

In regards to her marriage, Tutu van Furth said, "I had the extreme good fortune of growing up in a household with parents who were very clear about their faith and very clear about full inclusion of all people ... regardless of gender and gender identity and regardless of sexual orientation." Her father said in 2013 that he would never "worship a God who is homophobic" and both of them have been active in calls for LGBT equality. Desmond Tutu stated that he was "as passionate about [the campaign against homophobia] as I ever was about apartheid".

In September 2022, the Church of England's Diocese of Hereford refused a request to allow her to conduct a funeral in the diocese, that of her godfather and her father's friend the anti-apartheid campaigner Martin Kenyon, because she is married to a woman (the Church of England does not allow its clergy to marry the same sex). Former Bishop of Liverpool Paul Bayes criticised the decision and said: "We urgently need to make space for conscience, space for pastoral care, and space for love".

== Awards ==
- 2004 – South African Women for Women: Woman of Distinction Award
- 2007 – African Women of Empowerment Award
- 2010 – Abingdon Worship Annual Award

== Published works ==
- Made for Goodness: And Why This Makes All the Difference (2010; with Desmond Tutu)
- Tutu: The Authorised Portrait (2011; with Allister Sparks)
- The Book of Forgiving: The Fourfold Path for Healing Ourselves and Our World (2014; with Desmond Tutu)
- The Book of Queer Prophets: 24 Writers on Sexuality and Religion (2020; contributor, edited by Ruth Hunt)
