= Marguerite Young Alexander =

American educator and sorority founder

- Born: Marguerite A. Young; March 1, 1889; Springfield, Illinois, U.S.
- Died: December 3, 1954 (aged 65); Chicago, Illinois, U.S.
- Burial place: Sunset Cemetery, Evanston, Illinois
- Education: Howard University
- Occupation: Teacher
- Known for: Co-founder of Delta Sigma Theta

Marguerite Young Alexander (March 1, 1889 – December 3, 1954) an American educator and was one of the founders of Delta Sigma Theta sorority.

== Early life ==
Marguerite Young was born in Springfield, Illinois, the fourth child and only daughter of Minnier and James William Young, a hotel waiter.

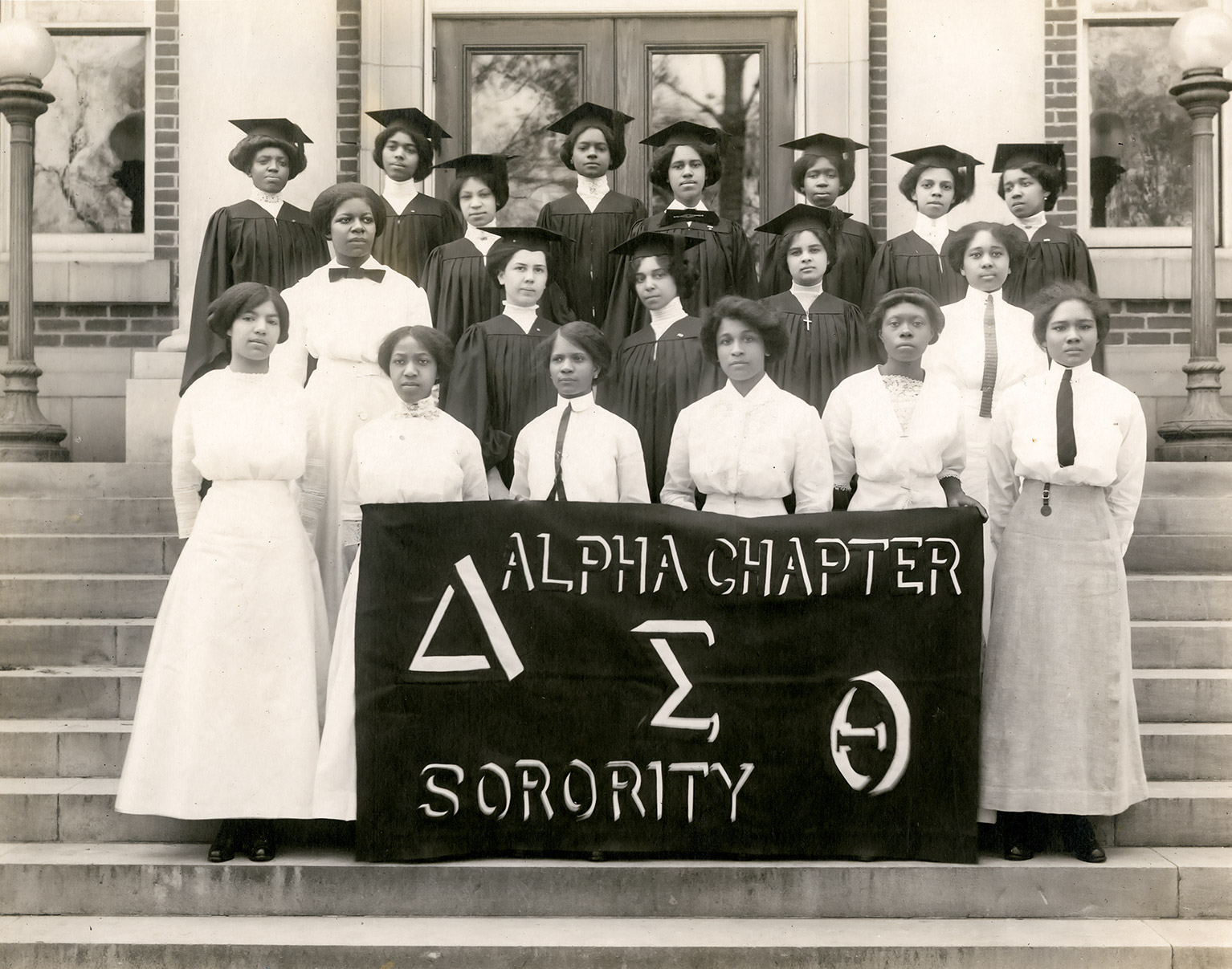
Delta Sigma Theta, 1913. Alexander is in the middle row, second from the right

She studied romance and classical languages at Howard University, graduating in 1913. On January 13, 1913, she and 21 other sorority sisters voted to withdraw and from Alpha Kappa Alpha and establish a new sorority, Delta Sigma Theta, that was devoted to community service and social activism. She marched in the Woman Suffrage Procession on March 3, 1913, with Delta Sigma Theta; it was the only black organisation in the Washington, D.C. march.

== Career ==
Young was an English teacher at DuSable High School in Chicago, Illinois. Later, she was a French and Spanish corresponding secretary for a business firm in Chicago.

== Personal life ==
She married Waldo Emerson Alexander, a dentist, on April 30, 1918. They had a son, George Young Alexander. The family lived in Chicago.

She continued to be active in Delta Sigma Theta, often serving as an honored guest. She was a charter member of the Lambda chapter of Delta Sigma Theta, based in Chicago. She was a member of St. Thomas' Episcopal Church.

She died in Chicago on December 3, 1954. She was buried in Sunset Cemetery in Evanston, Illinois.
