= Jeanette Triplett Jones =

American clubwoman

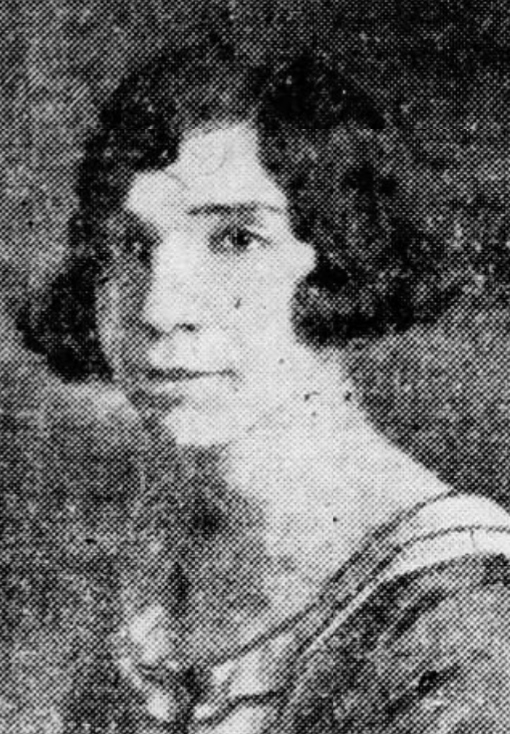
- Jeanette Triplett Jones, from a 1930 newspaper
- Born: January 27, 1895; Cincinnati, Ohio, U.S.
- Died: February 1, 1960 (aged 65); Detroit, Michigan, U.S.
- Occupations: Clubwoman, educator
- Known for: National president of Delta Sigma Theta (1933-1935)

Jeanette Triplett Jones (January 27, 1895 – February 1, 1960) was an American clubwoman and educator. She was the sixth national president of the sorority Delta Sigma Theta, holding that office from 1933 to 1935. She founded Chicago's NAACP Youth Council in 1942.

== Early life and education ==
Triplett was born in Cincinnati, Ohio, the daughter of M. Percival Triplett and Maude Nichols Triplett. Her father was a Pullman porter. She attended the University of Cincinnati, and earned a bachelor's degree from the University of Chicago in 1924.

== Career ==
Jones was a teacher in Chicago and Cincinnati. She taught speech and was dean of girls at DuSable High School. She retired from schoolwork in the mid-1950s.

Jones served as first vice president of Delta Sigma Theta in 1930, and was the national president of Delta Sigma Theta from 1933 to 1935. She succeeded Gladys Byram Shepperd and preceded Vivian Osborne Marsh.

In 1936, Jones established the NAACP Youth Council in Chicago. She was chair of Chicago Delta Projects in 1951, and was acting director of the South Side Community Art Center in 1956. She was active in the Girl Reserves of the YWCA and the National Council of Negro Women.

== Personal life ==
Triplett married accountant and postal clerk Wilbur T. Jones before 1930; they divorced by 1940. She died in 1960, at the age of 65, while attending a wedding in Detroit.
