= Delta Sigma Theta =

International historically African American sorority

- ΔΣΘ
- Founded: January 13, 1913; 113 years ago Howard University
- Type: Social
- Affiliation: NPHC
- Status: Active
- Emphasis: African American
- Scope: International
- Motto: "Intelligence is the Torch of Wisdom"
- Colors: Crimson and Cream
- Symbol: Lady Fortitude
- Flower: Purple violet
- Mascot: Elephant (unofficial)
- Publication: The Delta
- Chapters: 1,000+ (including alumnae chapters)
- Nicknames: Deltas, DST
- Headquarters: 1707 New Hampshire Avenue NW; Washington, D.C. 20009; United States
- Website: www.deltasigmatheta.org

Delta Sigma Theta Sorority, Inc. (ΔΣΘ) is a historically African American sorority. The organization was founded by college-educated women dedicated to public service with an emphasis on programs that assist the African American community. Delta Sigma Theta was founded on January 13, 1913 by twenty-two women at Howard University in Washington, D.C. Membership is open to any woman, regardless of religion, race, or nationality. Women may apply to join through undergraduate chapters at a college or university or through an alumnae chapter after earning a college degree.

The sorority currently has over 350,000 members and over 1,000 chapters located in the Bahamas, Bahrain, United Arab Emirates, Saudi Arabia, Qatar, Oman, Bermuda, Canada, England, Germany, Jamaica, Japan, West Africa and South Africa, South Korea, United Kingdom, and the United States. Delta Sigma Theta is also a member of the umbrella organization National Pan-Hellenic Council (NPHC) – an organization of nine international Black Greek-letter sororities and fraternities. The current (29th) International President and CEO is Cheryl W. Turner.

The first public act of Delta Sigma Theta was some of its members marched as students of Howard University, in the collegiate section in the Women's Suffrage March in Washington, D.C., on March 3, 1913. Delta Sigma Theta has created programming to improve political, education, and social and economic conditions, particularly within black communities. The sorority is most known for its collaboration with community organizations and corporations to further its programming goals. The sorority reached a centennial year, and became the first Black Greek-lettered organization to participate in the Tournament of Roses Parade in Pasadena, California, on January 1, 2013, with a float entitled "Transforming Communities through Sisterhood and Service".

== History ==
=== Creation ===
On January 13, 1913, Delta Sigma Theta Sorority, Incorporated was founded by twenty-two women at Howard University. Some of the founders were former members of Alpha Kappa Alpha who wanted to change the sorority's name, color, symbols and direction. In 1912, they proposed a vote to change the organization's name. This new name was to reflect the group's desire to change the visual image of the name of the group to look less like Alpha Phi Alpha fraternity.

The 22 founders of Delta Sigma Theta were:

- Osceola Macarthy Adams
- Marguerite Young Alexander
- Winona Cargile Alexander
- Ethel Cuff Black
- Bertha Pitts Campbell
- Zephyr Chisom Carter
- Mary Edna Brown Coleman
- Jessie McGuire Dent
- Frederica Chase Dodd
- Myra Davis Hemmings
- Olive Claire Jones
- Jimmie Bugg Middleton
- Pauline Oberdorfer Minor
- Vashti Turley Murphy
- Naomi Sewell Richardson
- Mammie Reddy Rose
- Eliza Pearl Shippen
- Florence Letcher Toms
- Ethel Carr Watson
- Wertie Blackwell Weaver
- Madree Penn White
- Edith Motte Young

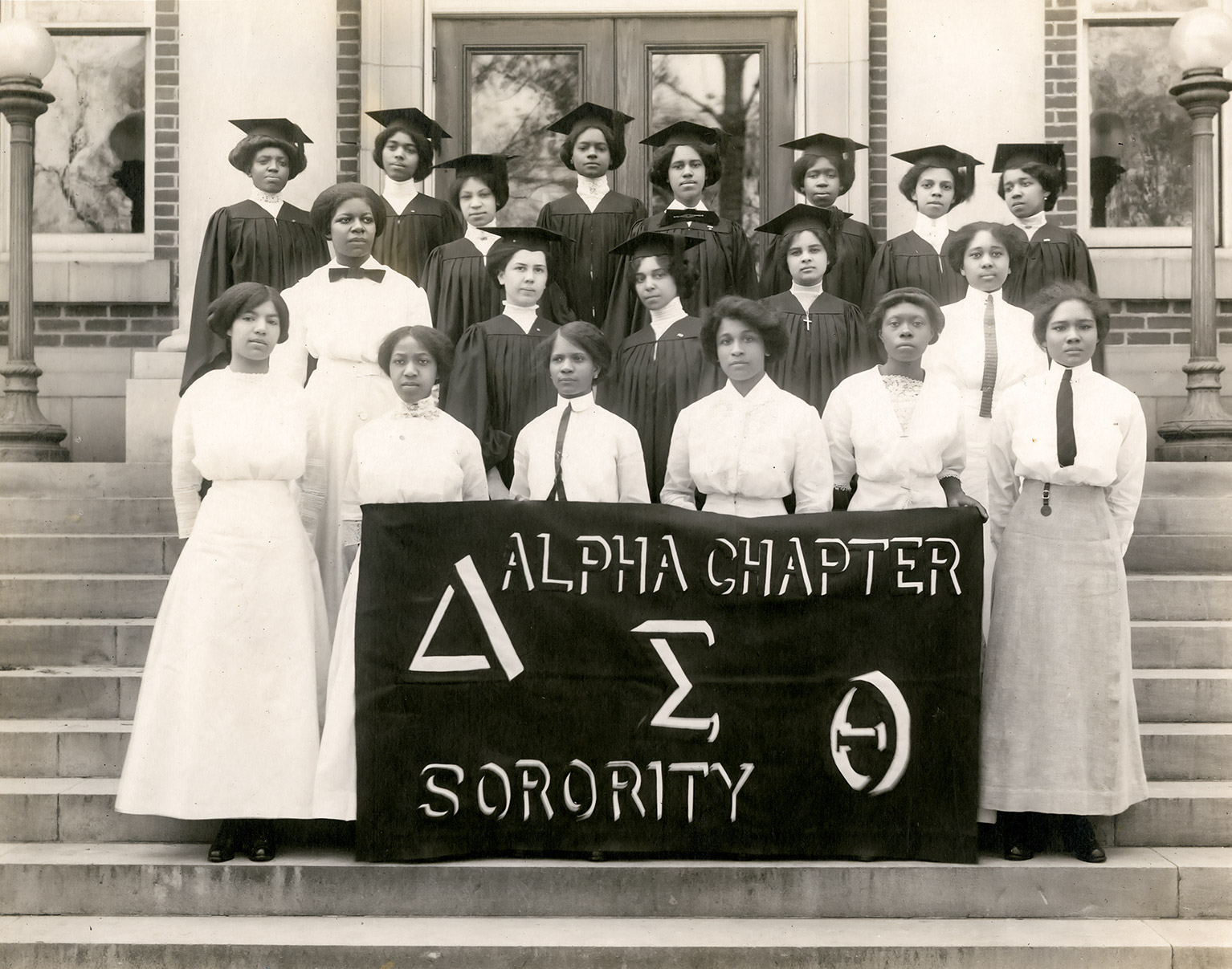
Nineteen of the Delta Sigma Theta founders in 1913

According to Delta Sigma Theta's historian, Paula Giddings, the 22 founders believed that Alpha Kappa Alpha did not have a charter, they believed they had no "legal entity". The young women believed that no charter meant there was no authority to form other chapters, thus limiting their ability to expand the scope of their activities. During the meeting where the changes were discussed, the past president from a few months prior, Nellie Quander, disagreed with the proposed changes and got the women to table the discussion until the entire membership had been polled.

On January 13, 1913, the women named the sorority Delta Sigma Theta and decided to reorganize and incorporate at that meeting. The new sorority's Alpha chapter was incorporated on February 18, 1913. On January 20, 1930, the organization's Grand Chapter was nationally incorporated. This incorporation allowed them to have authority over all of their chapters.

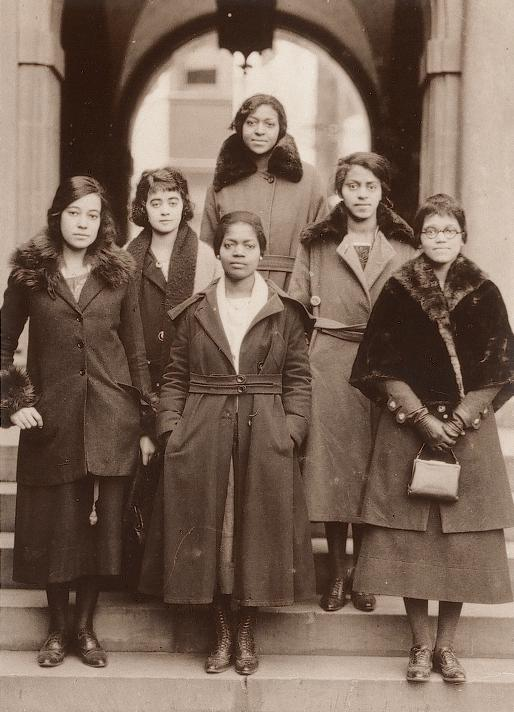
Members at the 1921 national convention (l to r): front, Virginia Margaret Alexander, Julia Mae Polk, Sadie Tanner Mossell; row 2, Anna R. Johnson, Nellie Rathbone Bright, Pauline Alice Young

Immediately following the founding, Delta Sigma Theta members quickly mobilized to build and develop infrastructure and implement programming. One of the first orders of business was to have an oath, which was written by Mary Church Terrell in 1914. In the early years, individual chapters would implement various programs to meet the needs of their local communities.

The sorority initially expanded with Beta chapter, established at Wilberforce University on February 5, 1914. Gamma chapter was established in 1918 at the University of Pennsylvania. Soon after, the Delta chapter was established on April 4, 1919, at the University of Iowa and Epsilon chapter at The Ohio State University on November 19, 1919.

The women also quickly realized that membership continued beyond undergraduate years and responded to the need for alumnae chapters. The first graduate chapters were authorized in 1920 at the Second National Convention for graduate members in New York City and Washington, D.C.

The 1920s began a decade of significant development within Delta Sigma Theta. The organization began to develop uniformity in programming and communication between the chapters of the sorority. In 1920, May Week was developed to encourage Black women to attend college, and the Official Publication of the sorority was established as "The Delta". Also in 1920, the Omega chapter was established to recognize deceased Sorors, and Sadie T.M. Alexander was voted the first Honorary Grand President of Delta Sigma Theta.

Delta Sigma Theta expanded west of the Rocky Mountains with the chartering of the Kappa chapter at the University of California in February 1921; however, its members weren't initiated until September 1922. Regions were established in 1925, and the Jabberwock was established as the scholarship fundraiser. Under the threat of losing its name, the sorority sought national incorporation. On January 20, 1930, the Grand Chapter of Delta Sigma Theta was incorporated as a perpetual body, which eliminated the need for each chapter to seek its charter.

=== Expansion: 1931–1955 ===
The incorporation of the sorority in 1930 allowed Delta Sigma Theta to legally continue its expansion of chapters. Before the establishment of perpetual bodies, new chapters had to apply for separate charters within their respective localities. However, with the national organization incorporated, chartering chapters became easier for regional leadership. The National Library Project was established in 1937 to provide access to books for Blacks in rural areas of the South where either no libraries were located, or they were not accessible to Blacks. They were able to loan books to some of the communities in at least 2 counties in the states of North Carolina and Georgia. The National Victory Book Drive occurred in 1943 to provide books to servicemen. In 1945, Delta Sigma Theta donated its first $1,000 to the United Negro College Fund. Also in 1945, Delta Sigma Theta, along with Alpha Kappa Alpha, Alpha Phi Alpha, Kappa Alpha Psi, Zeta Phi Beta, and Sigma Gamma Rho establish the American Council on Human Rights which had the goal to "mobilize the influence and resources of its members in the struggle for justice and equal opportunity for all U.S. Citizens." While there were many struggles for minorities and women within the United States, Delta leadership also realized the great struggle others of African descent faced around the world, which led to the establishment of the first foreign chapter in Port-au-Prince, Haiti in 1950. Given the great expansion of programming, and the increasing number of chapters and members, Delta Sigma Theta leadership realized there needed to be one central location in which all properties and records could be housed, and in 1953, Delta had the dedication of its first National Headquarters. In continuing to assist persons in need abroad, Delta established the Maternity Ward at Thika Memorial Hospital in 1955.

=== Women's and civil rights: 1956–1970 ===
Delta had previously moved toward having some uniformity of programming among chapters, with two international programs abroad. As it began its fifth decade of existence, the organization wanted to ensure that all chapters would focus their programming around one national centralized theme. Thus, the Five Point Thrust was implemented in 1956 by the 10th National President Dorothy Height. The five-point thrust is the five areas under which all Delta programming falls; the thrust is Educational Development, Economic Development, Physical and Mental Health, Political Awareness and Involvement, and International Awareness and Involvement. In 1960, Delta co-sponsored the National Organization of Women for Equality in Education conference. In 1963, while celebrating its 50th anniversary, Delta participated in the March on Washington and established the Social Action Commission at the 27th National Convention. In 1966, Delta Teen Lift was established and the Delta Sigma Theta Executive Board was received in the White House by President Lyndon B. Johnson to discuss community issues and concerns in 1967. In 1968, the Unwed Mothers program was established, and in 1970 Delta sponsored the East African International Women's Seminar in Nairobi, Kenya.

=== Golden Anniversary ===
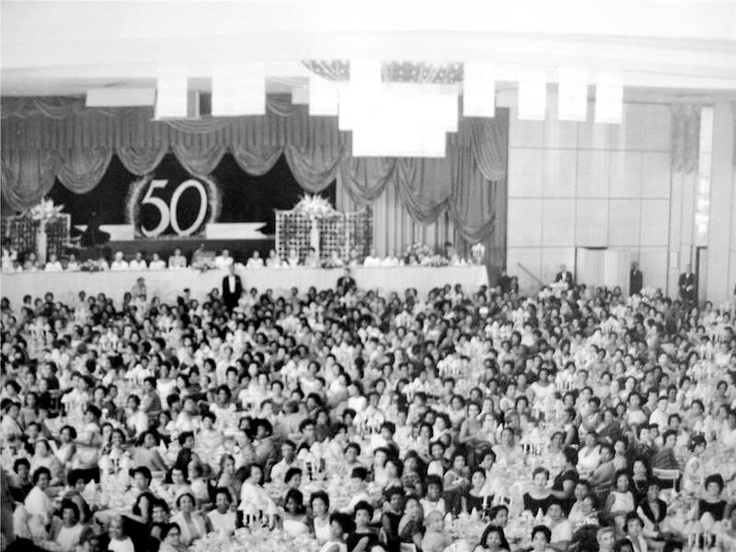
50th Anniversary 1963

In 1963, the sorority celebrated its Golden 50th Anniversary was celebrated; this was the same year as the March on Washington for Jobs and Freedom. Delta Sigma Theta's national president Dorothy Height was an organizer of the march and was the sole woman to have been seated on the speakers' platform. Delta members were also present at the march in large numbers.

The Golden Anniversary Luncheon was held on January 12, 1963. President John F. Kennedy addressed the membership, congratulated the sorority on their anniversary, and explained the necessity for all Americans to have equal education opportunities. Vice President Lyndon B. Johnson and Supreme Court Justice William O. Douglas also addressed the membership during the Golden Anniversary Celebration in 1963 at a reception held January 13. Founders Osceola McCarthy Adams, Winona Cargile Alexander, Ethel Cuff Black, Bertha Pitts Campbell, Myra Davis Hemmings, Jimmie Bugg Middleton, Eliza Pearl Shippen, Florence Letcher Toms, Wertie Blackwell Weaver, and Madree Penn White were in attendance. Soror Mary Elizabeth Vrooman wrote Shaped to its Purpose, a 50-year history of Delta Sigma Theta, which was published in 1965.

=== Education: 1971–1975 ===
While many strides had been made in the fifties and sixties to outlaw de jure segregation and discriminatory practices in schooling and public accommodations, many de facto discriminatory practices persisted. Delta understood the importance of education, and how educating communities would be essential in eradicating discrimination. In 1971, Delta and the Congressional Black Caucus co-sponsored National Policy Conferences on Education for Blacks, which focused on disparities and deficiencies in schools with high Black populations. The right-to-read program was established in 1973 to help the functionally illiterate. In 1975, Delta established life development centers to focus on issues placed by individuals from early childhood to senior citizens.

=== Support of women and mothers: 1976–1999 ===
In 1979, the Fortitude sculpture was unveiled on the campus of Howard University. "Fortitude" was originally surveyed as part of the Smithsonian's Save Outdoor Sculpture survey in 1993. The sculpture depicts a figure of a woman cut from a thin piece of metal. She "wears" a sleeveless dress, and high heels and has short, straight hair. She is walking; with her proper left arm swinging above her head and her proper right arm back behind her. The sculpture was unveiled on April 28, 1979, at 3:15 p.m. by members of Delta Sigma Theta, to honor the founders of the service sorority. The sculpture is described as symbolizing "the attributes of strength, courage, hope, wisdom, beauty and femininity as depicted by the 22 founders of Delta Sigma Theta".

In the early 1980s, the sorority began holding "Summits" which focused on various issues within the African American Community. Delta felt the need to bring attention to issues that affect minorities and women that remained largely ignored in the United States. In 1981, Delta held Summit I which focused on issues affecting American women. Summit II, a call to action in support of single parenting, was held in 1984. The Delta Research and Education Foundation sponsored an international conference in Nassau, Bahamas entitled, "Woman to Woman: Single Parenting from a Global Perspective" in 1987. In 1989, the School America program was established.

=== National and international programming: 1990–2002 ===
With significant scope and depth in the existing programming, Delta members felt the need to establish programming that enlarged the scope and reach of sorority activity. The First Delta Days in the nation's Capital was held in 1990 in Washington, D.C. At the event, Delta members met with congressional members to discuss policies that affected minorities and women. In 1992, Delta Sigma Theta became the first African American organization to collaborate with Habitat for Humanity and has built hundreds of houses for those in need. Delta held its Summit III, preparing young men for manhood, in 1993, in response to alarming dropout and incarceration rates among young men. In 1996, in collaboration with Habitat for Humanity, Delta traveled to Ghana and built 40 homes. Delta adopted the Adelaide Tambo School for the Physically Disabled in South Africa. In that same year, Delta received $1.6 million from NSF for project SEE [Science and Everyday Experiences], and traveled to Swaziland in southern Africa, to break ground for the Delta house that would be housing for children who became orphans due to their parents dying from HIV/AIDS, and dedicated the computer training center in Lesotho. In 2002, Delta was the second African American organization, after NCNW, to receive Special Consultative NGO status with the United Nations.

=== Centennial celebration ===
Delta Sigma Theta began a year-long centennial celebration on January 1, 2013. It kicked off its centennial year by being the first Black Greek letter organization to participate in the Tournament of Roses Parade in Pasadena, California, with a float entitled "Transforming Communities through Sisterhood and Service." Officials in Pasadena presented a proclamation to national president Cynthia M. A. Butler-McIntyre in honor of the sorority's 100 years of public service.

On Thursday, January 10, 2013, hundreds of members of Delta Sigma Theta gathered in New York City in Times Square for appearances on the Today Show and Good Morning America, followed by a caravan to Washington, D.C., which included buses bearing the Centennial logo. Between January 11 and 13, 2013, more than 12,000 members of Delta Sigma Theta convened at Howard University to participate in a range of activities, including 22 service activities and galas. On February 22, 2013, the American and Canadian side of the Niagara Falls were illuminated with red lights in honor of the sorority's centennial. Similarly, the White House was illuminated in red on January 13, 2013,

From March 1 to 5, 2013, thousands of members of Delta Sigma Theta participated in the Delta Days at the Nation's Capital. This is an annual event in which members of Delta Sigma Theta travel to Washington, D.C. to discuss pertinent issues that affect women and the Black community with members of Congress. On March 3, 2013, the sorority organized a re-enactment of the Woman Suffrage Parade of 1913. On March 8, 2013, Delta Sigma Theta participated in its tenth annual Delta Day at the United Nations.

In June 2013, Delta Research & Educational Foundation supported an elementary school in Cherette, Haiti which was impacted by the earthquake of January 2010. In recognition of the foundation's grant, the Chérette school administration will name the school Delta Sigma Theta Sorority, Inc. Elementary School, The Cynthia M. A. Butler-McIntyre Campus. The rebuilt school included six larger classrooms, new technologies, an administrative office building and access to clean water. Designated areas of the school were named in honor of the seven former national presidents: Frankie Muse Freeman, Thelma T. Dailey, Mona Humphries Bailey, Bertha M. Roddey, Marcia L. Fudge, Gwendolyn E. Boyd, and Louise A. Rice.

The sorority celebrated its Centennial Convention in Washington, D.C. the week of July 11 to July 17, 2013. More than 40,000 members participated in service activities and recognition events. As part of the yearlong celebration, a 22-city tour of the Delta Torch, which symbolized the "passion and commitment to the organization's global reach", kicked off in Los Angeles – with Delta's historic participation in the 2013 Tournament of Roses Parade – and continued through Seattle, Dallas, Little Rock, Detroit, Atlanta, Charlotte, New York City and Baltimore and International chapters in Japan and Bermuda. The tour culminated in Washington, D.C., at the 51st National Convention on July 11, 2013, when it was passed to the national president, signifying the start of the convention. During the Centennial Convention, the mayor of Washington D.C., honored the work of the sorority by renaming the 1700 block of New Hampshire Ave NW in Washington, D.C. "Delta Sigma Theta Way".

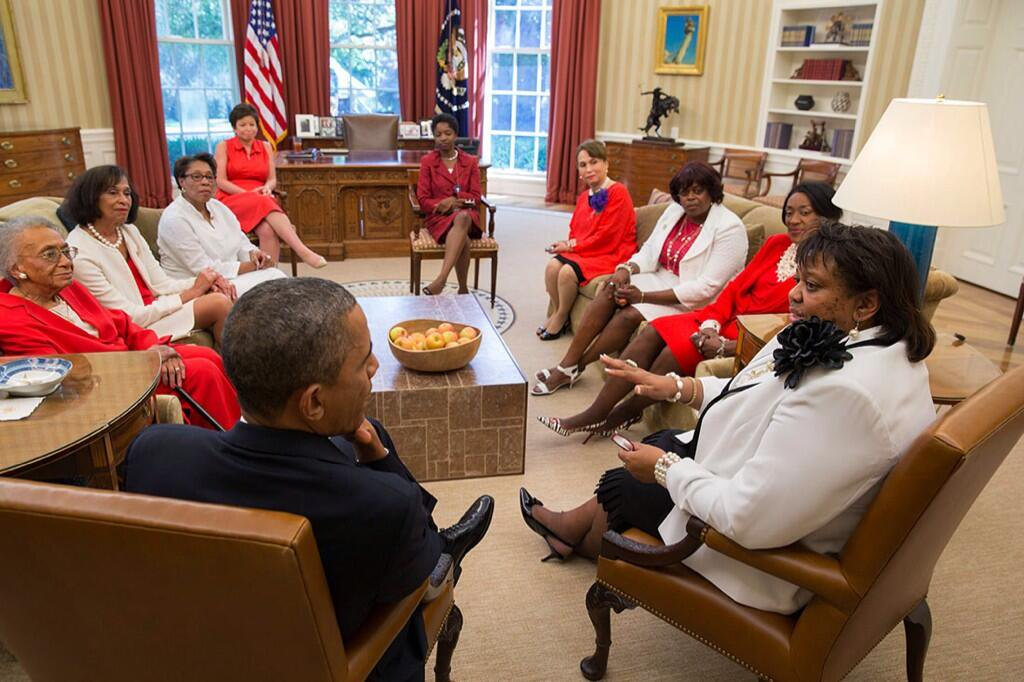
President Obama meeting with Delta leaders

Throughout 2013, Delta Sigma Theta was honored in many ways, including being highlighted in a Wal-Mart commercial, being honored by an NBA team, the Cleveland Cavaliers, being featured by CNN, MSNBC, The New York Times, The Wall Street Journal, and The Washington Post. A Delta Sigma Theta-themed window was dedicated Andrew Rankin Memorial Chapel at Howard University. Secretary of State Hillary Clinton said "Delta means change and Deltas are called to serve... Wherever you see women advancing, you see Deltas!". President Barack Obama invited the Delta leadership to the White House and addressed them in the Oval Office. The president addressed closing gala attendees via video.

Delta Sigma Theta's Torch

== Symbols ==
Delta Sigma Theta's motto is "Intelligence is the Torch of Wisdom". Its badge consists of the Greek letters "ΔΣΘ" in a row, with nine jewels on the middle letter. The official Delta Sigma Theta Hymn, written by Florence Cole Talbert and Alice Dunbar Nelson, was adopted in 1924. Its publication is The Delta.

Delta Sigma Theta's colors are crimson and cream, representing courage and purity. The sorority's symbol is Lady Fortitude. Its other symbols are the pyramid and the Delta torch. Its flower is the African violet. Its nicknames are Deltas and DST. The term soror, Latin for sister, is used among members of the sorority when referring to and addressing each other.

Some sisters use the elephant as an unofficial sorority mascot in honor of Florence Letcher Toms, one of the original founders of the sorority who collected them.

== Chapters ==
Delta Sigma Theta has more than 1,000 chapters, located in the United States, Canada, the Caribbean, England, Germany, Korea, Japan, Bermuda, Jamaica, Virgin Islands, West Africa, South Africa and Bahamas. Many Delta members continue to be active in alumnae chapters after graduating from college, and many join at the alumnae level.

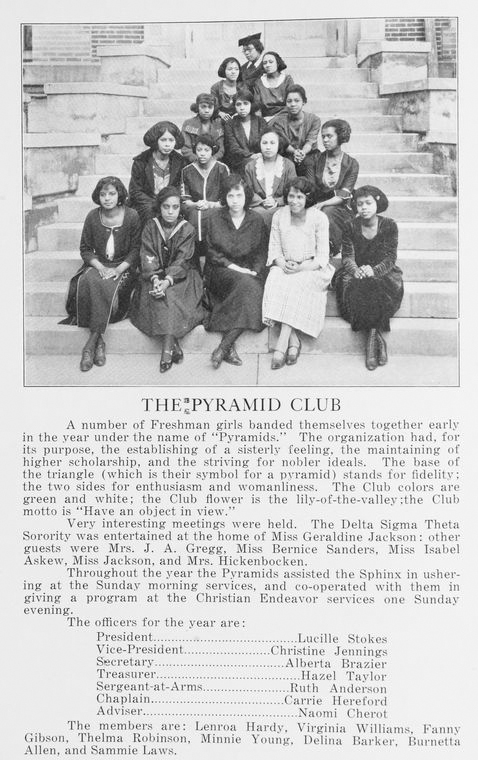
Delta Pyramid Club Beta chapter, 1922

== Notable members ==
Delta Sigma Theta is the largest African American women's organization in the world and has a membership of over 350,000 around the world. During the membership intake period, initiates are members of the Pyramid Club. Many members have been recognized as leaders in community activism, athletics, business, education and scholarship, entertainment, media, and literature, as well as in government.

== Organizational Structure ==
=== National headquarters ===
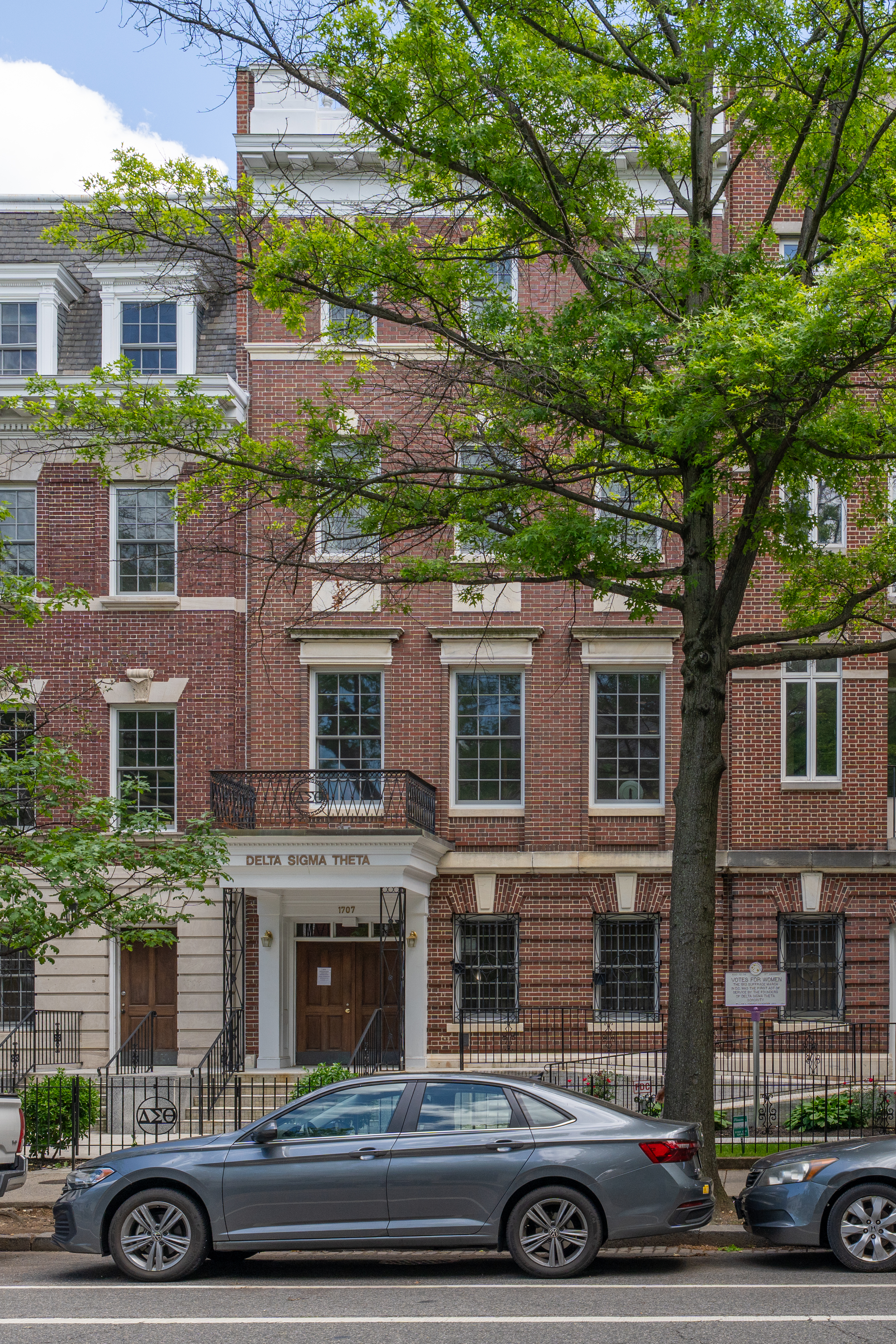
Headquarters (2026)

In 1953, Delta Sigma Theta purchased a national headquarters site located at 1814 M St. NW in Washington, D.C. In 1972, the sorority moved its headquarters to New Hampshire Ave. NW in Dupont Circle. The sorority headquarters is currently located at the property located at 1701, 1703, 1705, 1707, and 1709 New Hampshire Avenue, N.W. in the historic Dupont Circle neighborhood. In addition to serving as the national headquarters, the buildings house the Delta Research and Education Foundation (DREF), national staff and records, and equipment systems necessary to conduct Delta Sigma Theta's business.

=== National presidents ===
- Sadie Tanner Mossell Alexander 1919–1923
- Dorothy Pelham Beckley 1923–1926
- Ethel Lamay Calimese, 1926–1929
- Anna Johnson Julian, 1929–1931
- Gladys Byram Shepperd, 1931–1933
- Jeanette Triplett Jones, 1933–1935
- Vivian Osborne Marsh, 1935–1939
- Helen Elsie Austin, 1939–1944
- Mae Wright Downs Allen Peck Williams, 1944–1947
- Dorothy Irene Height, 1947–1956
- Dorothy Penman Harrison, 1956–1958
- Jeanne Laveta Noble, 1958–1963
- Geraldine Pittman Woods, 1963–1967
- Frankie Muse Freeman, 1967–1971
- Lillian Pierce Benbow, 1971–1975
- Thelma Thomas Daley, 1975–1979
- Mona Humphries Bailey, 1979–1983
- Elizabeth Hortense Golden Canady, 1983–1988
- Yvonne Kennedy, 1988–1992
- Bertha Maxwell Roddey, 1992–1996
- Marcia Louise Fudge, 1996–2000
- Gwendolyn Elizabeth Boyd, 2000–2004
- Louise Allen Rice, 2004–2008
- Cynthia Marie Antoinette Butler-McIntyre, 2008–2013
- Paulette C. Walker, 2013–2017
- Beverly Evans Smith, 2017–2021
- Cheryl Adrienne Hickmon, 2021–2022
- Elsie Cooke-Holmes, 2022–2025
- Cheryl W. Turner, 2025-Present

Delta Sigma Theta's seven regions

=== Regions ===
In 1925, the sorority began to organize its chapters into geographical regions. Initially, it created four regions: Eastern, Midwest, Far West, and Southern. Seven years later, the Central Region was established. In 1960, the Mid-Atlantic region was created. North and South Carolina left the Southern Region to become part of the new South Atlantic Region.

Each of the seven regions is led by a regional director and a collegiate regional representative, who provides a voice for the sorority's college-based members. Regional conferences are held biennially, alternating with the years in which National Conventions are held.

== Programs ==
Delta Sigma Theta has provided assistance to address the challenges faced by people in the United States and internationally as well. Over the years, the sorority has established programs to provide and improve education, health care, and international development, and strengthen the African-American family.

=== Five-Point ===
Delta Sigma Theta provides public service initiatives through the Five-Point Program Thrust. Delta Sigma Theta uses the Five-Point Programmatic Thrust as an organizing structure as it creates programs to benefit the African-American community. The Five-Point Programmatic Thrust was established in 1955.

1. Economic Development;
2. Educational Development;
3. International Awareness and Involvement;
4. Physical and Mental Health; and
5. Political Awareness and Involvement.

Each program's development and implementation operates cooperatively, coordinated by committees, the national executive board, and national headquarters staff. Leaders belonging to the Program Planning and Development Committee, Social Action Commission, Commission on Arts and Letters, Information and Communications Committee, Membership Services Committee, and Regional Officers also participate in developing programming to meet the Five-Point Programmatic Thrust.

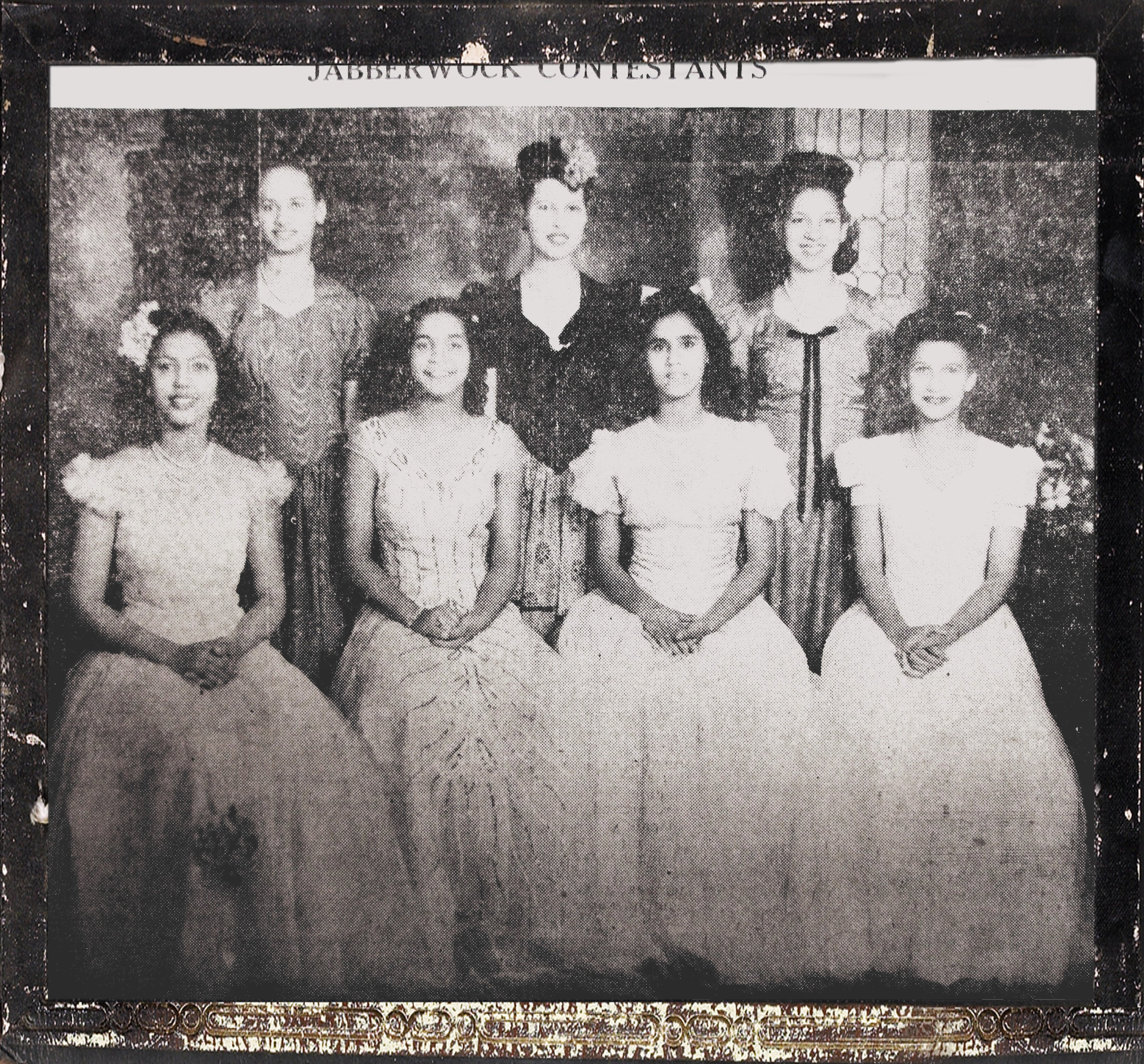
Delta Jabberwock contestants, 1945

=== Jabberwock ===
Jabberwock, an annual variety show consisting of cultural expression and talent – such as music, skits, and dance – was initiated by Marion Conover-Hope in 1925 in Boston, Massachusetts. Locally produced Jabberwock shows served as fundraisers for many chapters of the sorority. Funds from the programs support scholarships for youths and other public service projects. The program encourages and assists in the development of young individual talents. On December 28, 1947, the Delta Jabberwock was formally adopted and copyrighted by Delta Sigma Theta.

=== May Week ===
May Week was created at the second national convention in 1920 at Wilberforce University. Local chapters began to observe it beginning in 1921. The purpose of May Week is to emphasize the importance of higher education in the community, especially for black women. The slogan "Invest in Education" was adopted. A week in May is set aside for programs highlighting academic and professional achievement.

=== National Library Project ===
The sorority's first nationwide effort to provide library services in the rural South was the National Library Project, which it authorized in 1937. The program was implemented in 1945, to establish a traveling library in the South, where library services were not generally available for blacks, both because of segregation and because so many blacks lived in rural areas, which had fewer services. The project arose from concerns that few adequate resources were available, outside of those provided by segregated school systems. In 1939, only 94 out of 774 public libraries in the South served blacks. Additionally, only 5% of rural blacks had access to any public institution at all. The first traveling library was based in Franklin County, North Carolina, where 23 book baskets, with 33 books, were circulated.

=== Job Analysis and Opportunity Project ===
The Job Analysis and Opportunity Project began in 1941. It was to provide career, employment counseling, and job exposure for black women. The sorority created the program to address concerns that black women were limited in their choices of occupations and that they lacked training because of the economy and World War II. Some of the project's goals were to improve working conditions and to improve black women's opportunities to acquire a job.

=== Economic development ===
==== Delta Challenge ====
In 2003, the "Delta Challenge: DST Homeownership Initiative" was created to assist sorority members, family, friends, and the general public with owning their homes and investing in homeownership. The program is a resource for individuals seeking information about homeownership; wishing to locate a loan representative who partners with the Delta Challenge; information about mortgage insurance or other benefits; or who has questions regarding real estate or related financial topics. In three years, the program has helped more than 400 families purchase homes. The DST Homeownership Initiative is a partnership between Delta Sigma Theta's 950 chapters, Chase Bank, and Genworth Financial.

The national directors of the DST Homeownership Initiative are Lori Jones Gibbs and Lynn Richardson. Gibbs is the Genworth Financial's Vice-President of Affordable Housing and Industry Affairs, and Richardson is Chase Bank's Vice President of National Strategic Partnerships.

The Delta Challenge offers mortgage loans, insurance, and other home buyers' discounts through The Delta Chase Initiative. The Delta Chase Initiative resulted in more than 100,000 consumer touch points worldwide and $35 million in closings for Chase, a staggering 389% increase over those closed over the previous three years.

==== Habitat for Humanity ====
Delta Sigma Theta was the first national African-American organization to collaborate with Habitat for Humanity International in 1992, during National President Bertha Roddey's administration. Habitat for Humanity builds and rehabilitates homes with the help of selected homeowners, volunteer labor, management expertise, and tax-deductible donations of money and materials. Houses are sold to families without profit, and no-interest mortgages are issued over a fixed period. Between 1992 and 1994, Delta Sigma Theta and Habitat for Humanity built twenty-two homes throughout the United States. In 1996, sorority members and supporters traveled to Ghana, where they built forty Delta Habitat for Humanity homes.

==== Financial Fortitude ====
Financial Fortitude was designed to help sorority members and local communities attain personal wealth and financial security. Financial Fortitude was established as a result of increasing unemployment, Social Security debts, and the widening gap between wealth and poverty. Financial Fortitude helps participants to set and define goals, to develop a financial plan to achieve goals and to put their plan into action. Workshops are focused on topics such as debt management and reduction, retirement, financing for college, investing, insurance, estate and home ownership, savings, and entrepreneurship.

==== Delta Towers I ====
In 1979, Delta Sigma Theta's Washington D.C. Alumnae chapter and Delta's Housing Corporation planned and constructed Delta Towers as a multimillion-dollar, ten-story building. Delta Towers opened for occupancy in 1980. Delta Sigma Theta established Delta Towers in the northeast area of Washington, D.C. Delta Towers is an apartment building for elderly and disabled individuals. Delta Towers was the first retirement center founded by any of the African-American sororities or fraternities in the United States. While many African-American sororities and fraternities subsequently established, or have plans to establish, retirement centers, Delta Sigma Theta, once again, remains a leader in setting the standard for others to follow. Delta Towers currently has 150 independent-living residential apartments. Because of the success of Delta Towers, the chapter and housing corporation is constructing a second apartment building, Delta Towers II, near the first.

==== Delta Towers II ====
The Washington D.C. Alumnae chapter's Delta Housing Corporation is planning to construct Delta Towers II. Delta Towers II will provide 150 additional safe and affordable apartments for low to moderate-income senior citizens. Delta Towers II will be designed to provide a senior citizen wellness center, ground level commercial office and retail services, and a community room. Together, Delta Towers I and Delta Towers II will offer 300 affordable apartments for senior housing (affordable to households earning 60% or less of the area's median income). Construction on Delta Towers II began in March 2009.

=== Hurricane Katrina ===
The sorority established the Delta Hurricane Katrina Relief Task Force to facilitate the needs of Gulf Coast residents affected by the national disaster. The Hurricane Relief Task Force is responsible for creating strategies to address the numerous difficulties impacting persons displaced by Hurricane Katrina as it relates to housing, health and wellness, and emotional and financial needs. Delta Sigma Theta made a major commitment to three Historically Black Colleges and Universities that were affected by Hurricane Katrina. Collectively $700,000 was awarded to Dillard, Xavier, and Southern Universities over four years and a total of more than $1.2 million was committed to agencies, organizations, members, and other residents of the affected Gulf areas.

=== Educational development ===
==== Delta Academy ====
Dr. Betty Shabazz's Delta Academy ("Catching the Dreams of Tomorrow, Preparing Young Women For the 21st Century") is designed for girls ages 11 to 14, who have an interest in developing leadership skills. The program is named in honor of sorority member, the late Dr. Betty Shabazz, wife of Malcolm X. It is for girls who demonstrate the potential for success, but may not have support systems or access to financial resources. Participants are exposed to math, science, technology, and non-traditional careers. The Delta Academy sessions may also include service learning activities, field trips, and book clubs.

Delta Academy's symbol is the dream catcher. In Native American culture, the dream catcher possesses the power to capture bad dreams and entangle them into a web. The good dreams pass through the dream hoop's open center into the person.

==== Delta GEMS ====
Delta GEMS is an outgrowth and continuation of the Dr. Betty Shabazz Delta Academy Program. Delta GEMS was created to assist in facilitating the dreams and goals of at-risk, adolescent African-American girls, aged 14–18. Goals for Delta GEMS are:

1. To instill academic excellence
2. To provide tools permitting the girls to sharpen and enhance their skills to achieve academic success
3. To assist girls in setting and planning proper goals for their futures in high school and beyond
4. To create compassionate, caring, and community-minded young women by active involvement in community service opportunities.

The Delta GEMS framework has five major components (Scholarship, Sisterhood, "Show Me the Money", Service, and Infinitely Complete), which form a road map for college and career planning. Topics within the five major components provide interactive lessons and activities that allow opportunities for individual growth. Delta GEMS, like Delta Academy, is implemented by Delta Sigma Theta's chapters.

==== Delta GEMS Collegiate Challenge ====
Lawry's Foods partnered with Delta Sigma Theta to create the National Collegiate Public Service Caddy and Grant Recognition Program. The Collegiate Challenge recognizes and rewards a Delta collegiate chapter in each of Delta's regions for the Delta GEMS program's outstanding implementation. Regional winners receive $1,000, and the grand prize winner receives $5,000. In 2006, collegiate chapters were asked to partner with other collegiate chapters, alumnae chapters or community organizations in their municipality.

==== Maryland Educational Opportunity Center ====
The Maryland Educational Opportunity Center was established in 1979 and created with a special service grant of $450,000 – the largest grant awarded by the United States Department of Health, Education, and Welfare. MEOC is a free program in Baltimore which provides information and counseling services to adults and youths interested attending college or vocational/technical school. Having seven outreach centers, the program is sponsored by Delta Sigma Theta and funded by the federal government. The MEOC is a federal TRIO program and one of 130 Educational Opportunity Centers (EOC) in the country. From 1979 to 2006, MEOC has served more than 78,000 individuals. Nearly 20,000 participants were enrolled in postsecondary institutions.

==== Empowering Males ====
The EMBODI (Empowering Males to Build Opportunities for Developing Independence) program is designed to refocus the efforts of Delta Sigma Theta, with the support and action of other major organizations, on the plight of African-American males. Both informal and empirical data suggest that the vast majority of African-American males continue to be in crisis and are not reaching their fullest potential educationally, socially, and emotionally. EMBODI is designed to address these issues through dialogue, and recommendations for change and action. EMBODI will include a program format and information template. The delivery options may include a town hall meeting, workshops, and/or teen leadership summits.

==== Endowed scholarship at Howard University ====
In honor of the 22 Founders, in January 2003, members of Delta Sigma Theta as a part of the four-day celebration of the sorority's 90th anniversary, then National President Gwendolyn Boyd, presented Howard University President H. Patrick Swygert with a check for $1 million as an endowed scholarship, completely paid in full.

==== Distinguished Professor Endowed Chair ====
The Distinguished Professor Endowed Chair Award, established in 1977 at the 34th National Convention as a perpetual trust fund, confirms and extends the sorority's longstanding commitment to educational excellence through quality instruction at historically Black colleges and universities. Delta Sigma Theta's purpose is to support and sustain these historical institutions, supply assistance to enable the expansion of educational opportunities, and give long-overdue recognition to distinguished Black instructors and professors. Biennially, Delta Sigma Theta makes a grant to a historically Black college or university that provides support for a professor of distinction to be in residence.

=== Physical and mental health ===
==== Total Woman ====
The Total Woman: Mind, Body, and Spirit Lifestyle Change Initiative impacts the well-being of sorority members and members' families and communities at large. The Lifestyle Change initiative was started in 2004 by the Health Taskforce, providing physical and mental health expertise. Some of the program's goals are to educate on the importance and benefits of lifestyle changes affecting longevity, morbidity, and mortality; to identify organizational alliances that work towards addressing pertinent health issues, and to develop and implement health-focused programs.

Through the Initiative, the sorority is working to combat the high incidence of women's obesity. The program's first component is a challenge to chapter members to achieve and maintain healthier weights.

==== 50 Million Pound Challenge ====
In 2006, Delta Sigma Theta, in collaboration with Dr. Ian K. Smith and State Farm Insurance, began a partnership, encouraging members to become healthier by exercising and eating properly. Members joined with others in the African-American community to reverse the deadly effects of obesity. At the 2008 National Convention in Orlando, Florida, Delta Sigma Theta was presented with an award for the most weight lost by any sorority or fraternity.

==== American Heart Association Partnership ====
Heart disease is the leading killer of women and women of color in the United States. Delta Sigma Theta was the first sorority to join the American Heart Association's "Go Red for Women" campaign as an organizational alliance working to educate women on heart disease.

== Political awareness and involvement ==
=== Participation in the 1913 Women's Suffrage March ===
Less than two months after the sorority's founding, some members of Delta Sigma Theta participated in the historic 1913 Women's Suffrage March on Pennsylvania Avenue in Washington, D.C., as Howard University students as a part of the collegiate contingent on March 3, 1913. Marchers were subjected to racism, not only by people who were opposed to the enfranchisement of women but by march organizers reluctant to advocate suffrage for black women. Since 1890, white Democrats of the southern states of the former Confederacy had ratified new state constitutional amendments and passed legislation that effectively disfranchised most blacks and many poor whites. Black women marching for the right to vote reminded many that black men had also been disenfranchised. Also, in those years, Washington was effectively a segregated city in public areas. Several years later, Terrell confided her feelings about the National American Woman Suffrage Association and suffragist leader Alice Paul to NAACP representative Walter White. Terrell questioned Paul's loyalty to black women's rights, saying, "If [Paul] and other white suffragist leaders could get the Anthony Amendment through without enfranchising African American women, they would do so." Delta Founder, Florence Letcher Toms commented, "We marched that day so that women might come into their own, because we believed that women not only needed an education, but they needed a broader horizon in which they may use that education. And the right to vote would give them that privilege."

=== Delta Days in the Nation's Capital ===
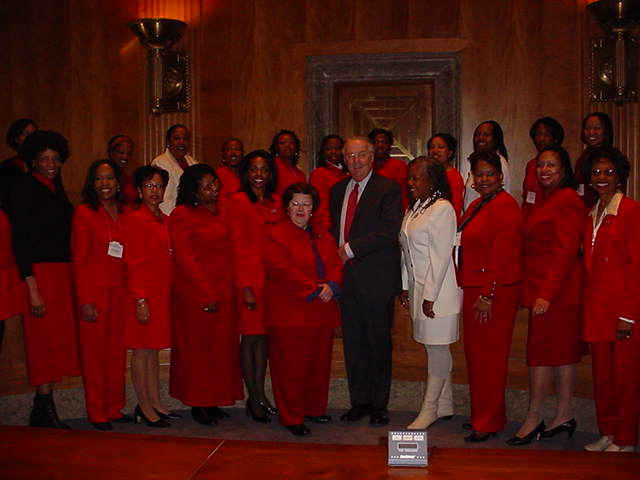
Senator Barbara Mikulski with Delta Sigma Theta members

In 1989, the National Social Action Commission instituted Delta Days in the Nation's Capital. Delta Days is an annual legislative conference to increase sorority members' involvement in the national public policy-making process. The annual conference includes legislative briefings, issue forums, and developing advocacy skills. Featured speakers include key policy makers, members of the United States Congress, staff members, and national policy experts.

In 2009, Delta Sigma Theta celebrated the twentieth anniversary of Delta Days in the Nation's Capital. The theme was "Advocacy in Action: Strengthening Our Legacy". Topics included empowering members to be effective social action advocates in the areas of quality education, affordable health care, Census 2010, and economic viability. An orientation for first-time attendees providing "how to's" on navigating the legislative process, legislative letter writing, congressional testimony, resolution writing, and coalition building was provided.

In addition to Delta Days in the Nation's Capital, each state organizes annual events in which members discuss and advocate state and local issues with their state legislative bodies.

=== Delta Days at the United Nations ===
On March 27, 2003, Delta Sigma Theta became a non-governmental organization (NGO) with special consultative status at the United Nations (UN). National President Gwendolyn Boyd accepted the credentials on behalf of the sorority, before 150 UN members from across the world, in a presentation by Hanifa Mezoui, Chief NGO Secretary in the Department of Economic and Social Affairs of the UN (ECOSOC). Delta Sigma Theta was welcomed to the United Nations by Assistant Secretary-General for External Affairs, Gillian Sorensen, who advised the sorority, "[to] use your NGO status to monitor the status of women and children in the world and bind together with other NGOs to ensure that the UN honors its commitments." Delta Sigma Theta was granted Special Consultative Status as an NGO to the Economic and Social Council of the UN as a result of volunteer services and humanitarian efforts around the world. Delta Sigma Theta is the first African American sorority and one of only three African-American organizations with the NGO special consultative status with the United Nations, the other two African American organizations with this status are the National Council of Negro Women, Inc. and The Links, Incorporated.

Both other organizations have significant ties to Delta Sigma Theta. National Council of Negro Women, Inc. was founded by Delta member Mary McLeod Bethune, and headed by many Delta members including Delta 10th National President, Dorothy Irene Height for more than five decades, and currently by Delta member Ingrid Saunders Jones. The Links co-founder and first president, Sarah Strickland Scott was a member of Delta Sigma Theta, and several national presidents of the Links are also Delta members including Immediate Past National President Margot James Copeland.

=== Voting rights ===
The sorority is committed to creating programs advocating:

1. Reauthorization of the Voting Rights Act of 1965
2. Repeal of Voter Disenfranchisement laws.
3. Repeal of Felony disenfranchisement in the United States
4. Full implementation of the Help America Vote Act.

As part of their advocacy for voting rights, Delta Sigma Theta has partnered with VoteRiders, an organization that seeks to assist eligible voters in exercising their right to vote.

== International awareness and involvement ==
=== World AIDS Day ===
Delta Sigma Theta supported the World AIDS campaign in observance of World AIDS Day, on December 1, 2008. With the slogan "Stop AIDS! Keep the Promise", Delta Sigma Theta promotes workshops, programs, and information dissemination. Individual chapters and members continue increasing awareness of HIV/AIDS in the community

=== Mary Help of the Sick Mission Hospital ===
Concerns about inadequate prenatal and maternity care for women in Africa prompted Delta Sigma Theta to invest in health care for women in Kenya. In 1955, Delta Sigma Theta established a maternity wing and health services in Thika Town. The sorority began planning for a larger facility in the early 1960s and financed the construction of Thika Maternity Hospital. The first hospital to open after Kenya gained independence in 1963, it is now known as Mary Help of the Sick Mission Hospital. Missionary Sisters of the Holy Rosary operate the facility.

In 1985, Delta Sigma Theta members visited the hospital. They were able to see the positive results of an increased population and improved infant mortality rate in and around Thika. In response, the sorority donated another $20,000, to establish two additional maternity wards and an administrative office.

Mary Help of the Sick Mission Hospital now has 121 beds and provides affordable prenatal and postnatal care, nutritional education, child immunization, and family planning. The hospital gives prenatal care, including lab work, blood tests, and examinations for 200 women each day. The facility also has a special-care nursery for newborn babies. The hospital serves to educate nurses and midwives. Over 66 students are trained each year.

=== Summit VI ===
In April 2006, Delta Sigma Theta commemorated 25 years of providing summit programs with an International Awareness Program: "Summit VI: Health Issues Impacting Women of African Descent". Held in Jamaica, the health issues summit heightened awareness of increases in diabetes, heart disease and obesity among African-American women. The conference included various formats for a variety of healthcare experts to disseminate information, such as workshops, panels, and town hall formats.

== Scandals and member misconduct ==
=== Embezzlement ===
On April 20, 2021, former executive director and member Jeanine Henderson Arnett and her husband Diallo Arnett pleaded guilty in Federal court to embezzling more than $200,000 from Delta Sigma Theta. Due to the gravity of the crime, Jeanine Henderson Arnett was expelled from the organization when the sorority discovered the misappropriated money and reported the crime.

News reports indicate that the couple spent the money on items like designer Coach handbags, rental cars, real estate, Amazon purchases, and other expenses between 2017 and 2019. Federal prosecutors also determined that over $14,000 had been transferred to their personal bank account. Channing Phillips, acting U.S. Attorney for the District of Columbia, said in a press release: "While Delta Sigma Theta and its members were committed to a mission of public service, the defendants were committed to a mission of personal benefit, stealing hundreds of thousands of dollars to use for their pleasure."

In November 2021, Jeanine was sentenced to 16 months in prison and her husband Diallo was sentenced to 12 months and one day in prison. They must collectively pay $228,357 in fines and will be placed on five years' supervised release after their prison sentence.

=== North Texas rapist ===
In October 2011, a serial rapist in the Dallas area was reported to be targeting Delta Sigma Theta alumnae, attacking four alumnae in their mid-50s to mid-60s over eleven months. The sorority issued a release advising its members not to identify their affiliation with the sorority via their cars, key chains, clothing, or Facebook postings. The case was featured on the December 9, 2011, episode of America's Most Wanted. In 2021, a 48-year-old Texas man was arrested. In 2024, he pleaded guilty and was sentenced to life in prison.

=== Hazing ===
At McNeese State University in September 2006, the chapter was found guilty of severely hazing pledges. Eleven members involved were each fined $1,000 and the chapter was fined $1,000 by the sorority's headquarters. The university banned the sorority from campus for four years.

At the University of Tennessee at Chattanooga, in April 2009, one member was arrested on two counts of simple battery, and several other members were disciplined for the physical and mental abuse of pledges. One pledge was admitted to the hospital due to internal bleeding and stomach pains she developed because of physical abuse by members of the sorority.

At East Carolina University, in November 2010, Delta pledges Victoria Carter and Briana Gather died in a traffic accident around 6:30 am on the way to a hair appointment that had been set up to prepare for initiation. Gather and Carter had allegedly undergone several grueling hazing activities that week. The driver of the vehicle, a fellow pledge who survived, pleaded guilty to misdemeanor death by motor vehicle. According to the lawsuit filed by the family, she was suffering from "excessive and overwhelming fatigue, exhaustion and sleep deprivation and fell asleep behind the wheel" due to the pledging exercises. They did not have the opportunity to sleep as a result of the long hours. Members of the sorority were also accused of lying and attempting to destroy all evidence of hazing throughout the investigation process in the lawsuit filed. East Carolina University put the chapter on probation immediately after the crash, with the sorority's central office suspending the chapter until at least 2015.

=== Sorority Sisters ===
In December 2014, VH1 debuted Sorority Sisters, a reality of television show that followed the personal and professional lives of several alumnae of National Pan-Hellenic Council sororities in Atlanta, Georgia, including five members of Delta Sigma Theta. The show was canceled before the last three scheduled episodes aired. In January 2015, Delta Sigma Theta's national leadership expelled the five cast members from the sorority. One of the expelled members sued the sorority, extending the scandal into 2018.

Delta Girl

The Delta girl has been given the opportunity of education and broad development: she has enjoyed the privileges of culture and selected environment.

It is pleasing to a heartfelt depth to see her not as self-centered, not desirous of selfish power, not wanting the plaudits of people, not wanting glory- but with a purpose that directs her activities and all that she may control toward lifting somebody else.

— Mary McLeod Bethune

== Popular culture and literature ==
The poem "Delta Girl" was written by honorary member Mary McLeod Bethune. The poem is said to embody the ideals of a Delta Sigma Theta woman.

== See also ==
- List of social sororities and women's fraternities
- Cultural interest fraternities and sororities
- List of African-American fraternities and sororities
- List of Delta Sigma Theta national conventions
- Victoria Carter and Briana Gather
