= Gladys Byram Shepperd =

American educator

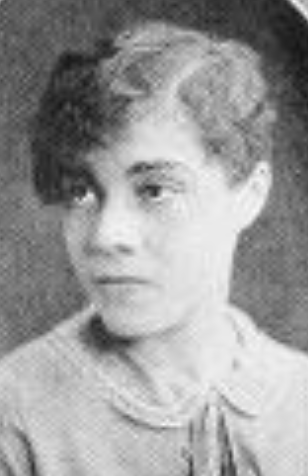
- Gladys Byram (later Shepperd), from the 1927 yearbook of the University of Chicago
- Born: Gladys Josephine Byram; June 1, 1902; Memphis, Tennessee, U.S.
- Died: August 5, 1985 (aged 83); St. Louis, Missouri, U.S.
- Other names: Gladys Biram
- Occupations: Educator, writer, clubwoman
- Known for: Fifth national president, Delta Sigma Theta (1931–1933)

Gladys Josephine Byram Shepperd (June 1, 1902 – August 5, 1985) was an American educator, writer, and clubwoman, and the fifth national president of the Delta Sigma Theta sorority.

== Early life and education ==
Gladys Byram was born in Memphis, the daughter of George Washington Byram and Rebecca J. Busby Byram. Her mother was a teacher and her father was a barber. In 1923, she read the Emancipation Proclamation at a Memphis event marking the 60th anniversary of its publication. She graduated from the University of Chicago in 1927.

== Career ==
Shepperd taught history in the segregated high schools of Baltimore from 1927 to 1956. She was eastern regional director of Delta Sigma Theta after college. She was the fifth national president of Delta Sigma Theta, serving as the sorority's leader from 1931 to 1933. She succeeded Anna Johnson Julian, and was in turn succeeded as president by Jeanette Triplett Jones.

Shepperd wrote a biography of civil rights leader Mary Church Terrell, published in 1959. In 1960 she was one of the "several women of national reputation" invited to the annual Women's Week at Morgan State College. In 1966, she spoke at the dedication of the Mary Church Terrell Memorial Research Library in Washington, D.C. In the 1960s she was appointed by Spiro Agnew to the Gubernatorial Study Commission on Maryland Folklife.

== Publications ==
- Mary Church Terrell: Respectable Person (1959)

== Personal life ==
Byram married physician James Douglass Shepperd by 1930. They lived in Baltimore and had children Sandra and James. Her husband died in 1972. Gladys Byram Shepperd died in 1985, in St. Louis, Missouri, at the age of 83.
