= Eliza Pearl Shippen =

American academic (1888–1981)

- Born: February 2, 1888; Washington, D.C.
- Died: May 17, 1981 (aged 93); Hyattsville, Maryland
- Education: M Street High School (1904); Miner Teachers College; Howard University (B.A., 1912); Teachers College, Columbia University (M.Ed., 1928); University of Pennsylvania (Ph.D. in English Literature, 1944)
- Occupations: English professor, college administrator
- Employer: D.C. Teachers College
- Known for: One of the founding members of Delta Sigma Theta
- Relatives: John Shippen (brother)

Eliza Pearl Shippen (February 2, 1888 – May 17, 1981) was an American educator, and one of the founding members of Delta Sigma Theta. She was an English professor and Dean of Women at University of the District of Columbia (then known as Miner Teachers College).

== Early life and education ==
Shippen was from Washington, D.C., the daughter of John Matthew Shippen and Eliza Spotswood Shippen. Her father was a Presbyterian minister, and her older brother, John Shippen, was a professional golfer. She graduated from M Street High School in 1904. She trained as a teacher at the University of the District of Columbia (then known as Miner Teachers College). In 1912, she graduated from Howard University.

In 1913, she became one of the founding members of Delta Sigma Theta. She completed a master's degree in education at Teachers College, Columbia University in 1928, and doctoral studies in English literature at the University of Pennsylvania in 1944. Her dissertation was titled "Eugenia de Acton (1749–1827)".

== Career ==
Shippen taught school in Washington, D.C. before and after her time at Howard University. She was dean of women at Miner Teachers College, and chair of the English department, and taught English literature courses there. She was the 11th president of the College Alumnae Club. She retired from D.C. Teachers College in 1954. In 1958 she published a research article on English poet Rose Fyleman in Elementary English. She was active in Howard and Delta alumnae activities in Washington into the 1970s.

== Personal life ==
Shippen died at a nursing home in Hyattsville, Maryland, in 1981, aged 93 years. Her grave in Hyattville is with the grave of fellow Delta Sigma Theta founder and Washington educator Florence Letcher Toms, with a shared memorial stone donated by the sorority.
