= Mandela House =

National Heritage Site of South Africa

Nelson Mandela National Museum
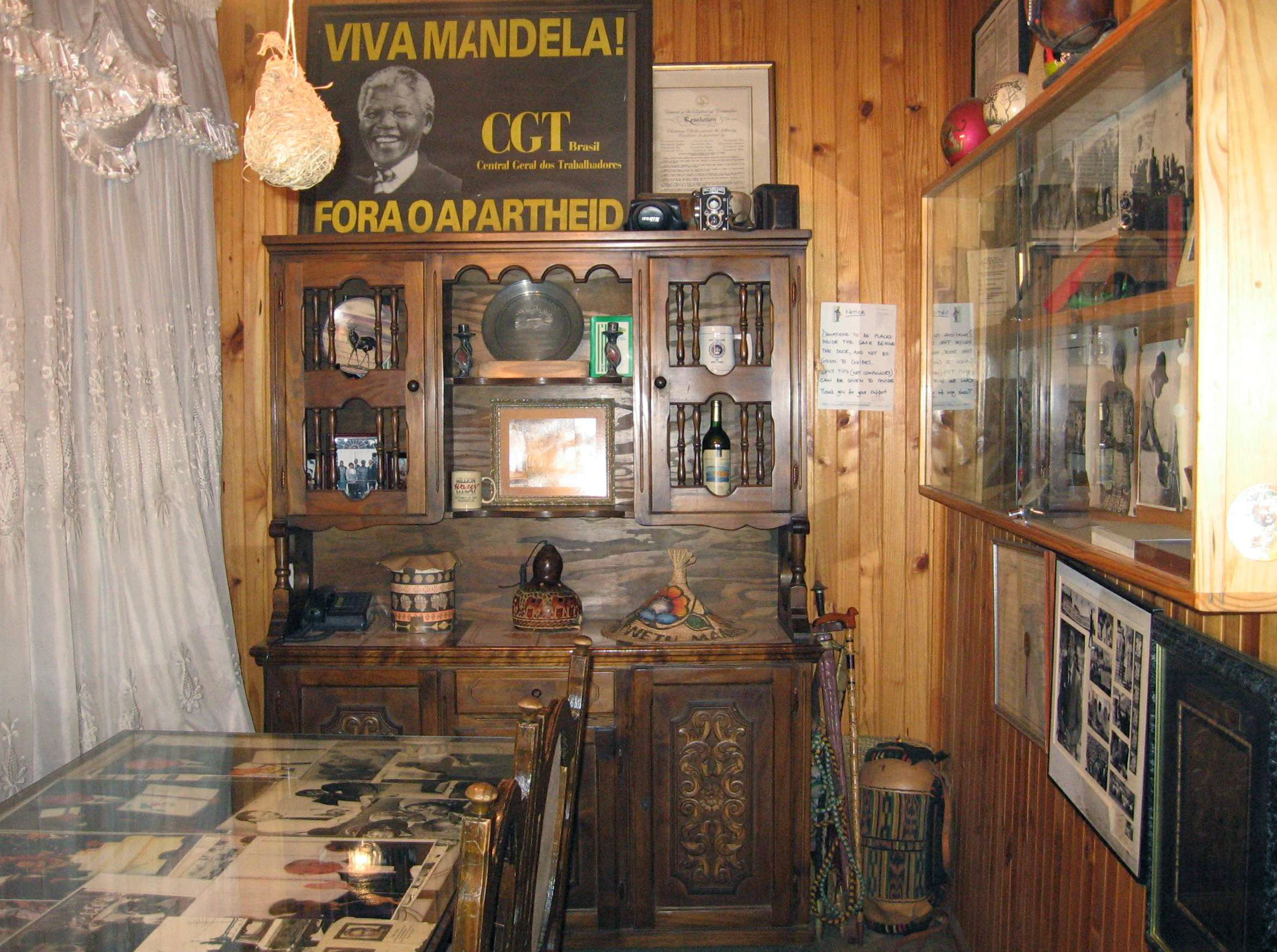
- One of the rooms of Mandela House
- Established: 1997
- Location: Vilakazi Street, Orlando West, Soweto, Johannesburg
- Coordinates: 26°14′18.73″S 27°54′31.58″E
- Type: Johannesburg's historical heritage
- Website: www.mandelahouse.com

The Nelson Mandela National Museum, commonly referred to as Mandela House, is the house on Vilakazi Street, Orlando West, Soweto, South Africa where Nelson Mandela lived from 1946 to 1962. It is located at number 8115, around the corner of Vilakazi and Ngakane Streets and a short distance up the road from Tutu House, the home of Archbishop Emeritus Desmond Tutu. Mandela donated the house to the Soweto Heritage Trust, of which he was the founder, on 1 September 1997 for it to be run as a museum. The house was declared a National Heritage Site in 1999.

== Features ==
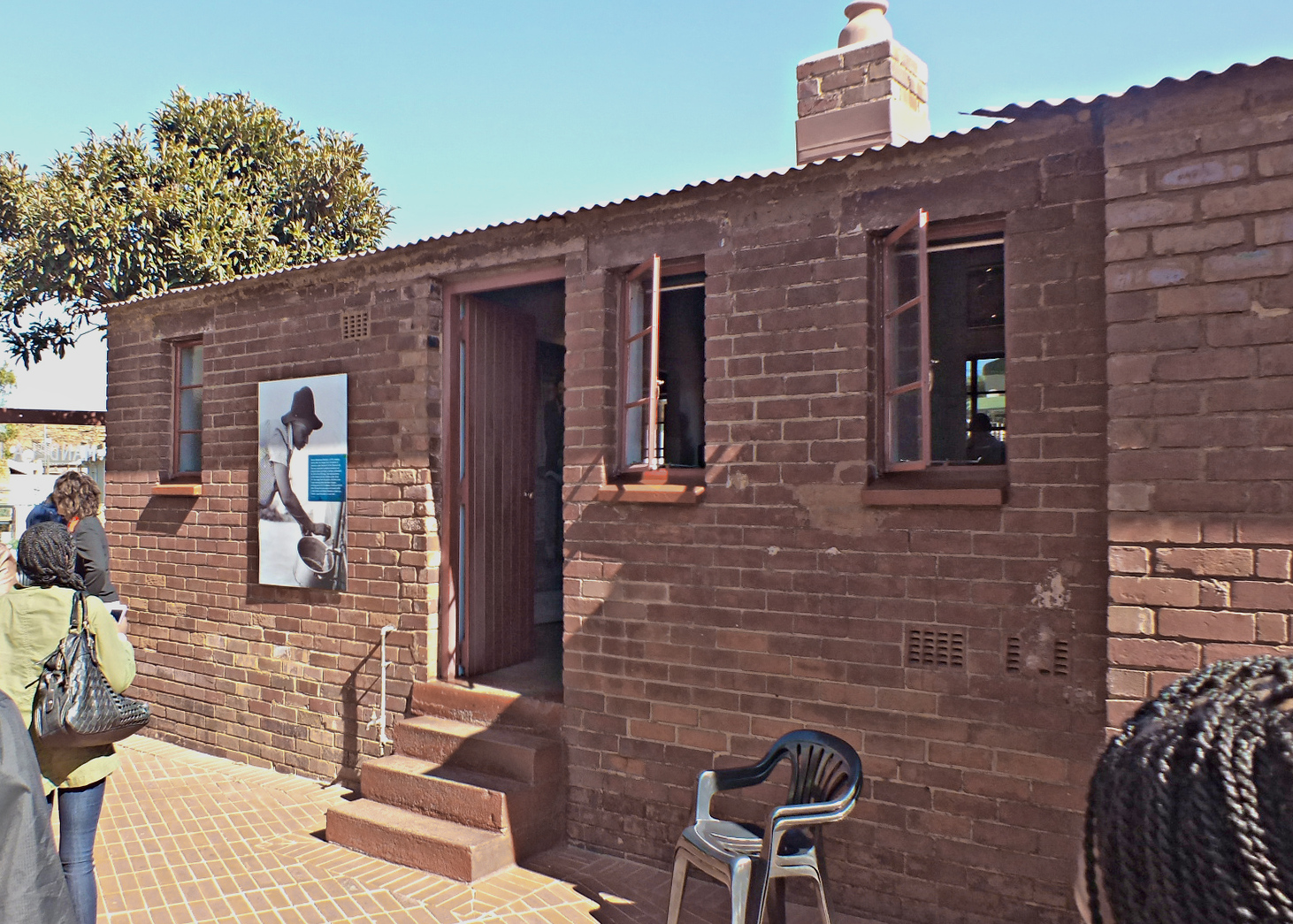
Mandela House

The house is a single-story red-brick matchbox built in 1945. It has bullet holes in the walls and the facade has scorch marks from attacks with Molotov cocktails. The inside hosts some original furnishings and memorabilia including photographs, citations given to Nelson Mandela, and the world championship belt given to Mandela by Sugar Ray Leonard.

As of 2009, the property includes a visitors' centre and a small museum.

== Popularity ==
In 1999, Soweto was the 16th most popular place for tourists to South Africa to visit, and that was partly ascribed to the opening of Mandela House in December 1997.

== History ==
Mandela came back to the house after his release from prison in 1990, despite suggestions from government officials that he find a safer home. At a rally welcoming him home to Soweto his opening words were, "I have come home at last." However, after 11 days back at the house he moved out again.

He later wrote in his autobiography:

That night I returned with Winnie to No. 8115 in Orlando West. It was only then that I knew in my heart I had left prison. For me No. 8115 was the centre point of my world, the place marked with an X in my mental geography.

=== Repairs ===
In 2007, the Soweto Heritage Trust determined that Mandela House was in serious need of attention. Among the concerns were the physical condition of the house and its contents, the lack of any visitor facilities, the lack of training of the guides and the lack of a consistent message. There were also no formally researched exhibition content and displays.

Accordingly, in June 2008 the Trust's deed was amended to focus more exclusively on Mandela House. A new visitor centre was commissioned, restoration work was authorised, a highly qualified curator was appointed, and re-training of staff was scheduled. The building was closed to the public in April 2008 and construction work commenced on 18 July 2008.

It was re-opened to the public on 19 March 2009.

== Mandela Mansion ==
As President of South Africa Mandela's private residence was the Mandela Mansion in Houghton Estate, Johannesburg, a property that after his death went into the Zindzi Mandela Family Trust.

== Nearby places of interest ==
- Tutu House
