= Jessie McGuire Dent =

American teacher (1891–1948)

Jessie McGuire Dent (1891–1948) was one of the 22 founders of the Black sorority Delta Sigma Theta. After graduation from Howard University, and years of teaching high school in her hometown of Galveston, Texas, she successfully sued the Galveston independent school district for unequal pay of Black teachers.

== Early life ==
She was born in Galveston, Texas, on March 24, 1891. She attended high school at Central High School and graduated in 1908. This school was one of the first Black high schools in Texas, and was established in 1885.

== Education and sorority involvement ==
McGuire attended the segregated Central High School in Galveston, graduating in 1908, before attending the historically Black Howard University in Washington, D.C. She was one of the co-founders of the Delta Sigma Theta Sorority, which was founded on January 13, 1913, and later became a charter member of the Gamma Chapter in Galveston. As of 2020, the sorority had more than 300,000 members along with chapters founded around the world. Dent was installed as the first corresponding secretary of the Alpha chapter of Delta Sigma Theta.

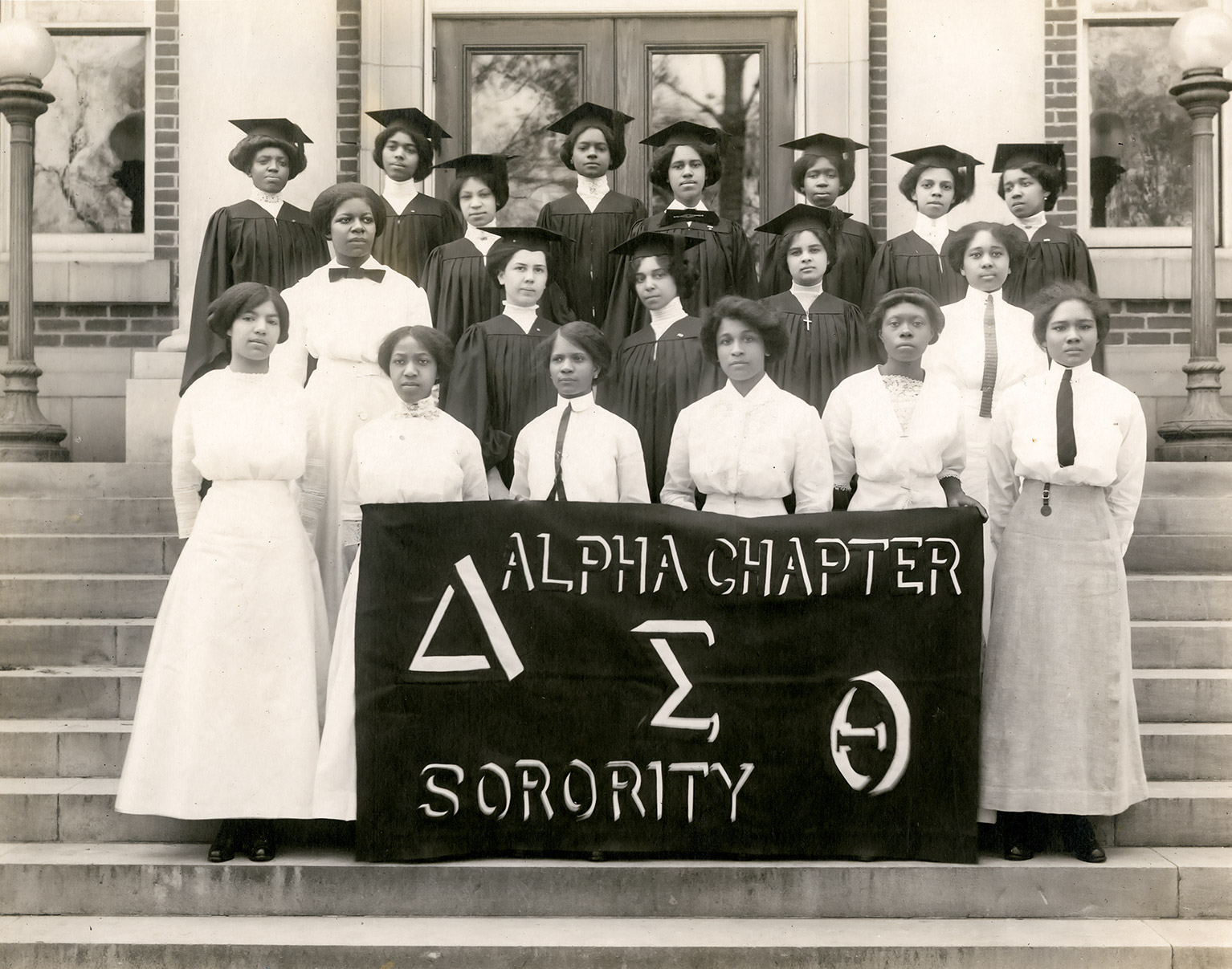
Delta Sigma Theta founders, 1913, at Howard University. Dent: Back row, sixth from left.

Members of Delta Sigma Theta were stated to have marched in the Woman Suffrage Procession on March 3, 1913, in Washington, DC. However, a closer look at the facts determined that only the seniors of sorority marched and did so as representatives of Howard University. As a member of the class of 1913 it is likely that she was a member of the Howard contingent that marched in March 1913. Mary Church Terrell, best known as an advocate for women’s rights was made an honorary member of Delta Sigma Theta in 1919 and marched as a woman in the college section.

== After graduation ==
After graduating from Howard, Dent returned to Galveston in 1913 and began teaching English and Latin at Central High School, later serving as the dean of girls.

Jessie McGuire Dent remained active in the community after her graduation. She was also active in the Colored Unit of the Women's Christian Temperance League, the National Association for the Advancement of Colored People (N.A.A.C.P), the Federation of Colored Women's Clubs, and in 1941, she joined the Colored Teachers State Association's Texas Commission on Democracy in Education.

== Family ==
In 1929, Jessie McGuire married Thomas Henry Dent. They produced a child in 1929 named Thomas Henry Dent Jr. Their marriage ended in 1938 and their son passed shortly after in 1940. As she did not have family to inherit her estate, she and fellow founding sister Frederica Chase Dodd developed a 'survivors will'. This 'survivor's will' stated that the sister who outlived the other would inherit their estate. Dodd outlived Dent by twenty-four years, and thus inherited Dent's estate. Dent died in Galveston, Texas on March 12, 1948.

== Suing the Galveston Public School District ==
When Dent first started teaching for Galveston Central High School in 1913, she was paid $50 a month. By 1943, after 30 years of teaching, she was only paid $1,548 annually. This was about 20% less than the district paid white teachers,. She and her attorney, William J. Durham of Sherman, Texas, sued the Galveston School District in federal court under a violation of the 14th Amendment rights of equal protection under the law. On June 15, 1943, her lawsuit was settled in favor of Black teachers and administrations.

As a result, the school board was required to fully equalize pay of Black and white teachers by 1945. Beyond her activism for equal salaries, Dent continued to advocate for integration in Galveston's public schools.

Now the Galveston public school district has been awarded an A for financial integrity rating for 10 years in a row. Currently, the school district has a beginner's teachers salary of $53,550, with an average of $57,485, and a max salary of $74,815. These salaries are not discriminative based on race. Though the school district does not mention Dent or her lawsuit, they boast about their high salaries that is a result of Dent's 1943 case. Additionally, Dent's goal of integration for Galveston public school systems have been realized as evident in the demographic information provided from the district. As of January 2021, the school system has about 23.4% African Americans, 49.3% Hispanic, 23.9% White, 1.9% Asian, <1% Native Americans and 3.1% of students of two or more races.
