= Frederica Chase Dodd =

American clubwoman (1893–1972)

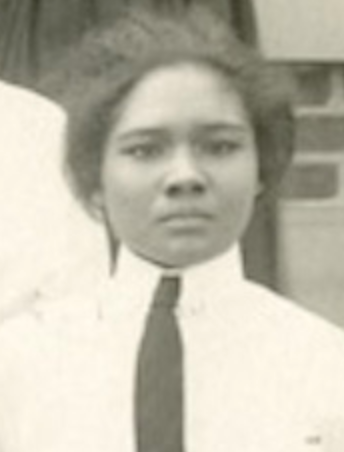
- Frederica Chase Dodd, from a 1913 photo
- Born: November 3, 1893; Dallas, Texas
- Died: January 21, 1972 (aged 78); Dallas, Texas
- Education: Dallas Colored School No. 2 Howard University (B.A.); Atlanta University (M.S.W.)
- Occupations: Educator, social worker, clubwoman
- Employer(s): Dallas Welfare Bureau, Negro Community Welfare Agency, Family Service of Dallas (1936-1961)
- Organization(s): YWCA; National Association of Colored Women's Clubs

Frederica Chase Dodd (November 3, 1893 – January 21, 1972) was an American educator, social worker, and clubwoman, one of the founders of Delta Sigma Theta.

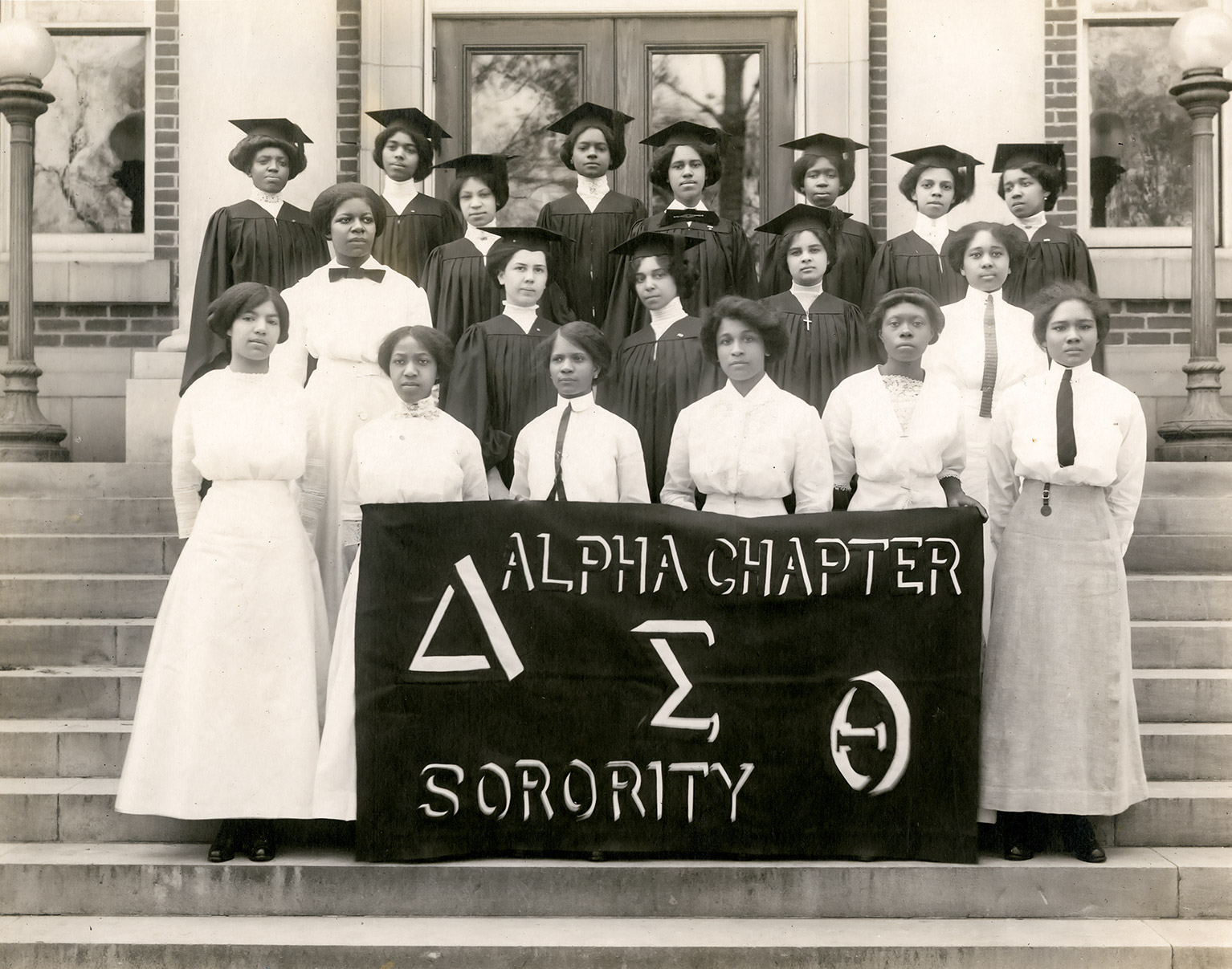
The founders of Delta Sigma Theta, including Frederica Chase (front row, far right), in 1913

== Early life and education ==
Chase was born in Dallas, Texas, the daughter of Frederic K. Chase and Fannie L. Hall Chase. Her father was an attorney and politician who died shortly before her birth. Her mother was a teacher. She graduated from Dallas Colored School No. 2, in 1910, and attended Howard University in Washington, D.C.

She and 21 other Howard women founded Delta Sigma Theta in 1913. On January 13, 1913, Frederica and fellow Texans Zephyr Chisom Carter, Myra Davis Hemmings, and Jessie McGuire Dent with eighteen other Howard University women established the Delta Sigma Theta Sorority, which grew into a prominent international service organization with over 300,000 members in 2021. She served as the first sergeant-at-arms of the sorority’s Alpha chapter. Later in life, she earned a master's in social work degree from Atlanta University.

== Career ==
Chase taught school in Dallas after college, until she married in 1920. She was active in the National Association of Colored Women's Clubs and the YWCA, and president of the Priscilla Art Club. She co-founded the Dallas alumnae chapter of Delta Sigma Theta. When her husband became too ill to work, she became a social worker with the Dallas Welfare Bureau, and soon director of the Negro Community Welfare Agency. From 1936 to 1961, she was a counselor at Family Service of Dallas.

== Personal life and legacy ==
Chase married a physician, John Horace Dodd, in 1920, as his second wife. He died in 1946, after several years of illness. She inherited the estate of her sorority sister and close friend, Jessie McGuire Dent, in 1948. Frederica Chase Dodd died in 1972, aged 79 years, in Dallas.

The Dallas alumnae chapter of Delta Sigma Theta offers a Frederica Chase Dodd Scholarship to local students, and opened the Frederica Chase Dodd Life Development Center in Dallas. In 1985, the sorority published a short biography of Dodd, titled Beauty and the Best, Frederica Chase Dodd : the story of a life of love and dedication.
