= Benedict Wallet Vilakazi =

South African Zulu poet, novelist, and educator

- Bambatha kaMshin
- Born: 6 January 1906; KwaDukuza, Natal
- Died: 26 October 1947 (aged 41); Johannesburg, South Africa
- Education: University of South Africa; University of Witwatersrand
- Scientific career
- Fields: Poetry, linguistics
- Workplaces: University of Witwatersrand
- Thesis: Oral and written literature in Nguni.
- Doctoral advisor: CM Doke

Benedict Wallet Vilakazi (6 January 1906 – 26 October 1947) was a South African novelist, linguist, a descendant of the Zulu royal family, and a radically innovative poet who created a combination of traditional and Romantic poetry in the Zulu language. Vilakazi was also a professor at the University of Witwatersrand, where he became the first Black South African to teach University classes to White South Africans. In 1946, Vilakazi also became the first Black South African to receive a PhD.

Vilakazi Street along which the poet lived in the formerly segregated township of Soweto, is named after Benedict Vilakazi. Vilakazi Street is now very famous as the street where both Nelson Mandela and Archbishop Desmond Tutu also once lived.

== Early life and education ==
Benedict Vilakazi was born Bambatha kaMshini in 1906 at the Groutville Mission Station near KwaDukuza, Natal (now South Africa), the fifth child of Roman Catholic converts Mshini ka Makhwatha and Leah Hlongwane. His mother, Mrs Leah Hlongwane Vilakazi, was the daughter of Bangile, who was the sister of Queen Ngqumbazi, mother to King [Cetshwayo], wife to King Mpande ka Senzangakhona, and also the sister of the Right Reverend J Mdelwa Hlongwane ka Mnyaziwezulu, the son of Chief Matiwane.

Vilakazi split his childhood between herding the family's cattle and the local mission school until the age of 10, at which point he transferred to the St. Francis College in Mariannhill, a coeducational Roman Catholic secondary school founded by the Mariannhillers' local Trappist monastery. Here he was baptized with the name "Benedict Wallet," although at his mother's insistence he kept the surname of Vilakazi. He obtained a teaching certificate in 1923 and taught at Mariannhill and later at a seminary in Ixopo.

== Writing, teaching, research ==
In 1933, Vilakazi released his first novel Nje nempela ("Really and Truly"), one of the first works of Zulu fiction to treat modern subject matter. He followed it in 1935 with the novel Noma nini as well as a poetry collection Inkondlo kaZulu, the first publication of European-influenced Zulu poetry.

His poetry, heavily influenced by the verse of the European Romantics, introduced literary themes as well as both rhyme and poetic meters previously unknown in Zulu literature, while combining them with elements of the Izibongo tradition of praise poetry.

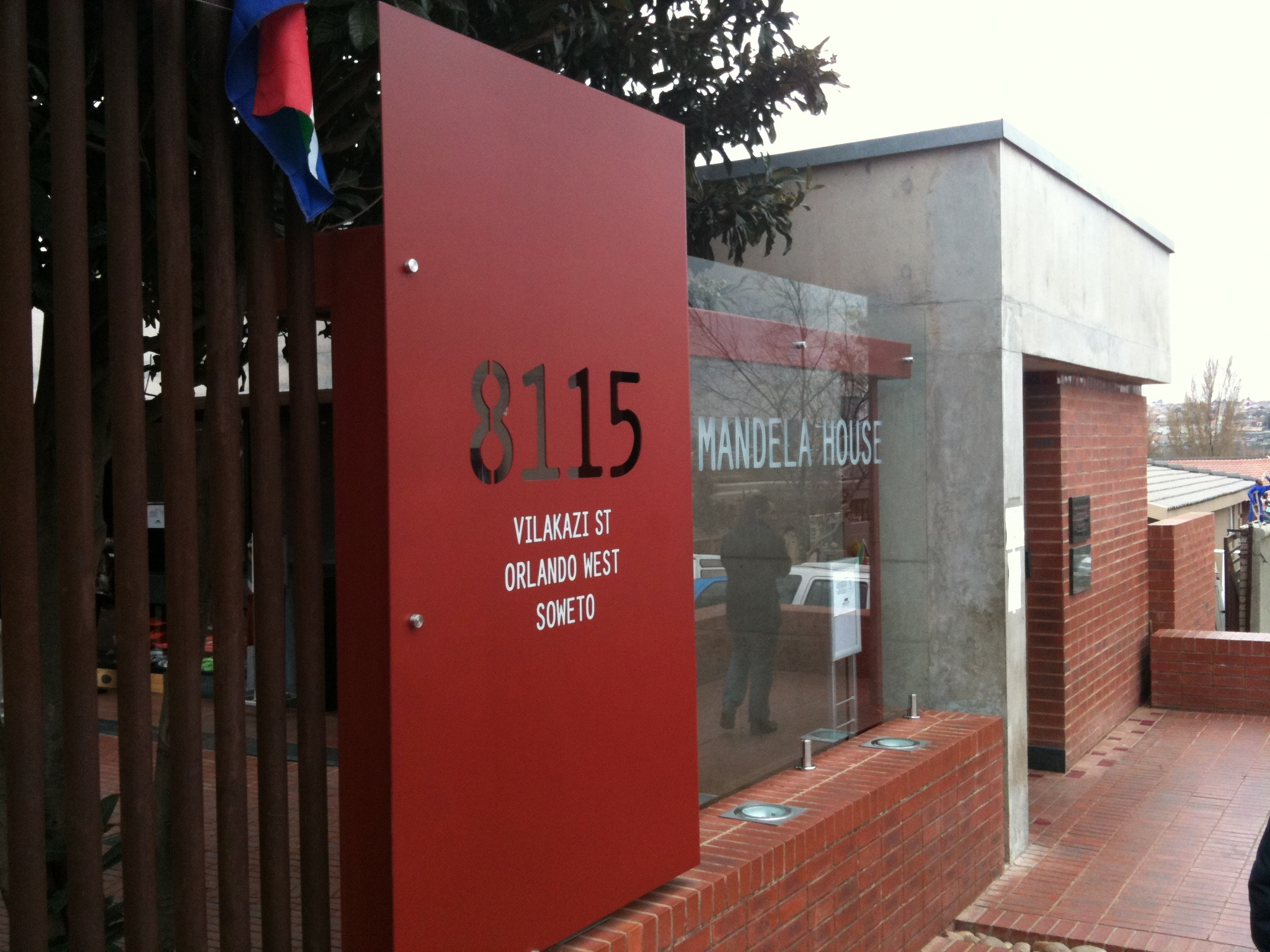
Vilakazi Street is where Mandela House (and Tutu House) is in Soweto

Earning a B.A. from the University of South Africa in 1934, Vilakazi began work in the Bantu studies department at the University of Witwatersrand in 1936 under linguist C. M. Doke, with whom he created a Zulu-English dictionary. Vilakazi's teaching position made him the first black South African to teach white South Africans at the university level.

Vilakazi's later novels continued to explore daily life in traditional Zulu culture, such as UDingiswayo kaJobe (1939) and Nje nempela (1944), which is the story of a polygamous Zulu family.

His poetry became increasingly political in the course of his life, dramatizing the exploitation and discrimination not only against the Zulu people, but also against other black South Africans as well.

Vilakazi is also noted for his scholarly work on oral tradition and the Zulu and Xhosa languages, which on 16 March 1946, earned him the first PhD to be awarded to a black South African.

A year after receiving his doctorate, Benedict Wallet Vilakazi died in Johannesburg of meningitis. Both his novels and poetry were well received in his own lifetime and remain so today.

== Legacy ==
Vilakazi Street in Soweto is where two Nobel Laureates, Nelson Mandela and Desmond Tutu, once lived and it was named in honour of Vilakazi, who was also a former resident. Dr B.W. Vilakazi Secondary School in Zola 3, Soweto was named after the late Dr Vilakazi in order to commemorate his legacy.

On 28 April 2016, the Order of Ikhamanga - Gold (OIG) was conferred on Dr Benedict Wallet Vilakazi posthumously‚ for "his exceptional contribution to the field of literature in indigenous languages and the preservation of isiZulu culture".

A literary translation by R.M. Mfeka and Peggy Rutherfoord of Benedict Vilakazi's poem Umamina was published in the anthology African Voices: An Anthology of Native African Writing.

In his 1974 book about the history of the Zulu royal family, historian Brian Roberts wrote, "the first Zulu King", meaning Shaka Zulu, "must remain an enigma." Roberts, however, praised Benedict Vilakazi, the last lines of whose Zulu language poem UShaka KaSenzangakhona ("Shaka, Son of Senzangakhona"), contain, "perhaps the most fitting epitaph to Shaka":

"The nations, Shaka, have condemned you,
Yet still today, they speak of you,
Still today their books discuss you,
But we defy them to explain you."

== Works ==
- Inkondlo kaZulu (poetry), Witwatersrand University Press (Johannesburg), 1935 (The Bantu Treasury series).
- Noma nini (novel), Yacindezelwa Emshinini Wasemhlathuzane (Mariannhill, Natal), 1935.
- UDingiswayo kaJobe (novel), Sheldon Press (London), 1939.
- Nje nempela (novel), Mariannhill Mission Press (Mariannhill, Natal), 1944.
- Amal'eZulu (poetry), Witwatersrand University Press, 1945.
- Zulu-English Dictionary (with C. M. Doke), Witwatersrand University Press, 1948.
- Nini indawo, Groutville, Natal.
