= Inauguration of Woodrow Wilson =

Inauguration of Woodrow Wilson may refer to:

- First inauguration of Woodrow Wilson, 1913
- Second inauguration of Woodrow Wilson, 1917

== See also ==
- The full text of Woodrow Wilson's First Inaugural Address at Wikisource
- The full text of Woodrow Wilson's Second Inaugural Address at Wikisource
