= Tutu House =

Home of Desmond and Leah Tutu in South Africa

Coordinates: 26°14′21.43″S 27°54′36.63″E

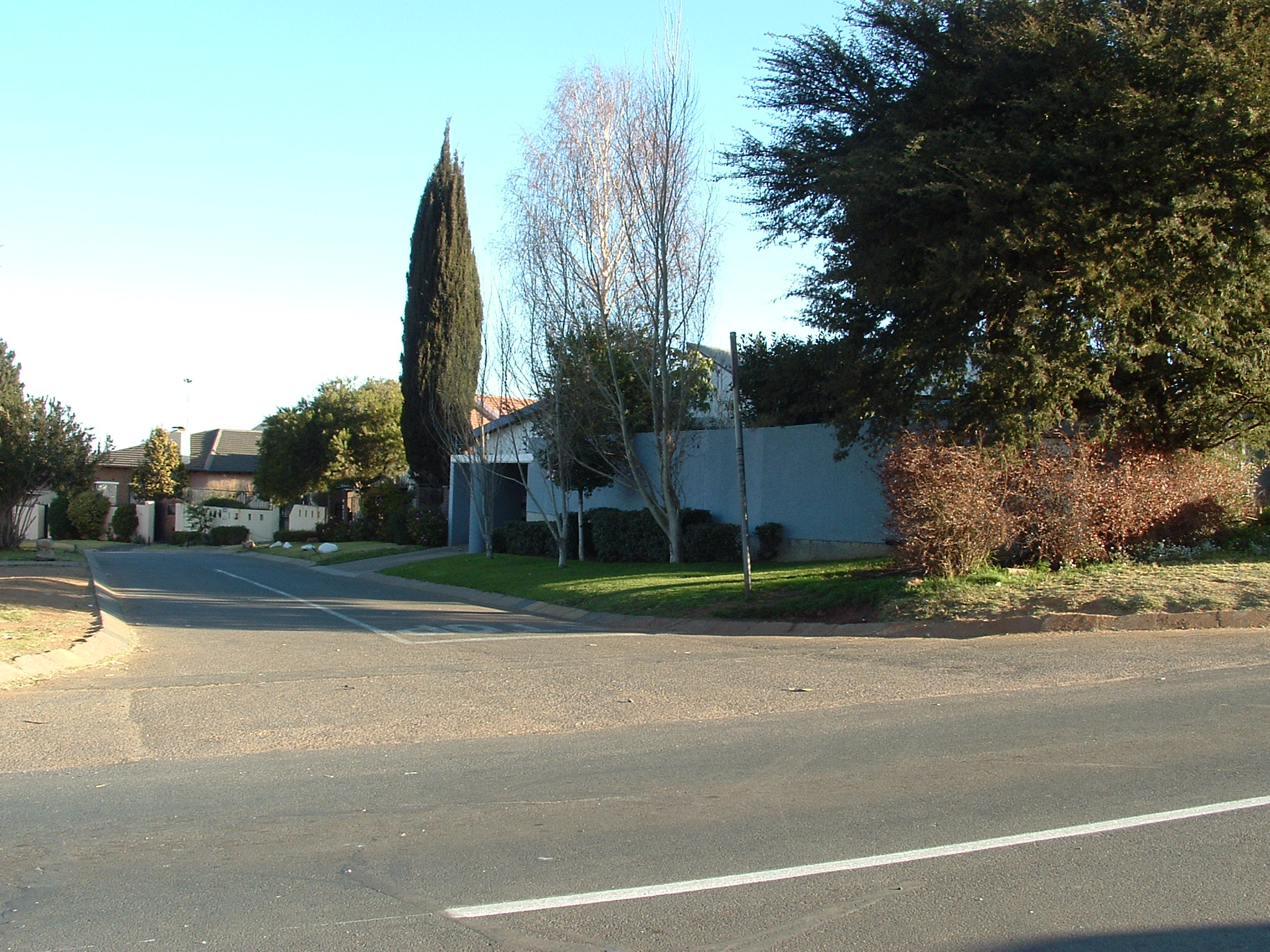
- The Tutu House

General information
- Location: Vilakazi Street, Soweto, Johannesburg, South Africa

The Tutu House is a house on Vilakazi Street in Soweto, Johannesburg, South Africa, that was the home to Desmond and Leah Tutu. The house is registered as part of Johannesburg's historical heritage.

== Description ==
Desmond Tutu and his family moved into this house in 1975. Vilakazi Street is said to be the only street in the world where two Nobel Laureates have lived. During the time that Tutu lived here he became a Nobel Laureate for his struggles against apartheid and he led the Truth and Reconciliation Commission for President Nelson Mandela.

Tutu did not need to live here, as he had been offered the dean's residence in the rich white suburb of Houghton, but Tutu was keen not to be seen as an "honorary white" so he lived twelve miles from the centre of the city. Conditions were poor in Soweto, which was the largest urban development in South Africa with over a million inhabitants but only one public telephone for every 26,000 inhabitants. Only 15% had electricity and 75% did not have running water when they first moved in. Black Africans were not allowed to own homes in Soweto as they were meant to see themselves as temporary workers. The house was extended by Jo Noero in 1990, the same architect who had worked at the Anglican Church in the Transvaal.

Tutu was still living there in October 2011. A blue plaque was installed on the Tutu house in 2011 as part of the Johannesburg heritage trail by what was then called the Simon van de Stel Foundation. Vilakazi Street attracts thousands of tourists since Mandela House was opened to the public in 1997, quickly becoming a top-twenty tourist destination. Tutu House is not open to the public, but the street does have several shops and restaurants. The house is now owned by the Anglican Diocese of Johannesburg and leased to the Desmond Tutu Programme to End World Hunger.
