= Nomalizo Leah Tutu =

South African activist (born 1933)

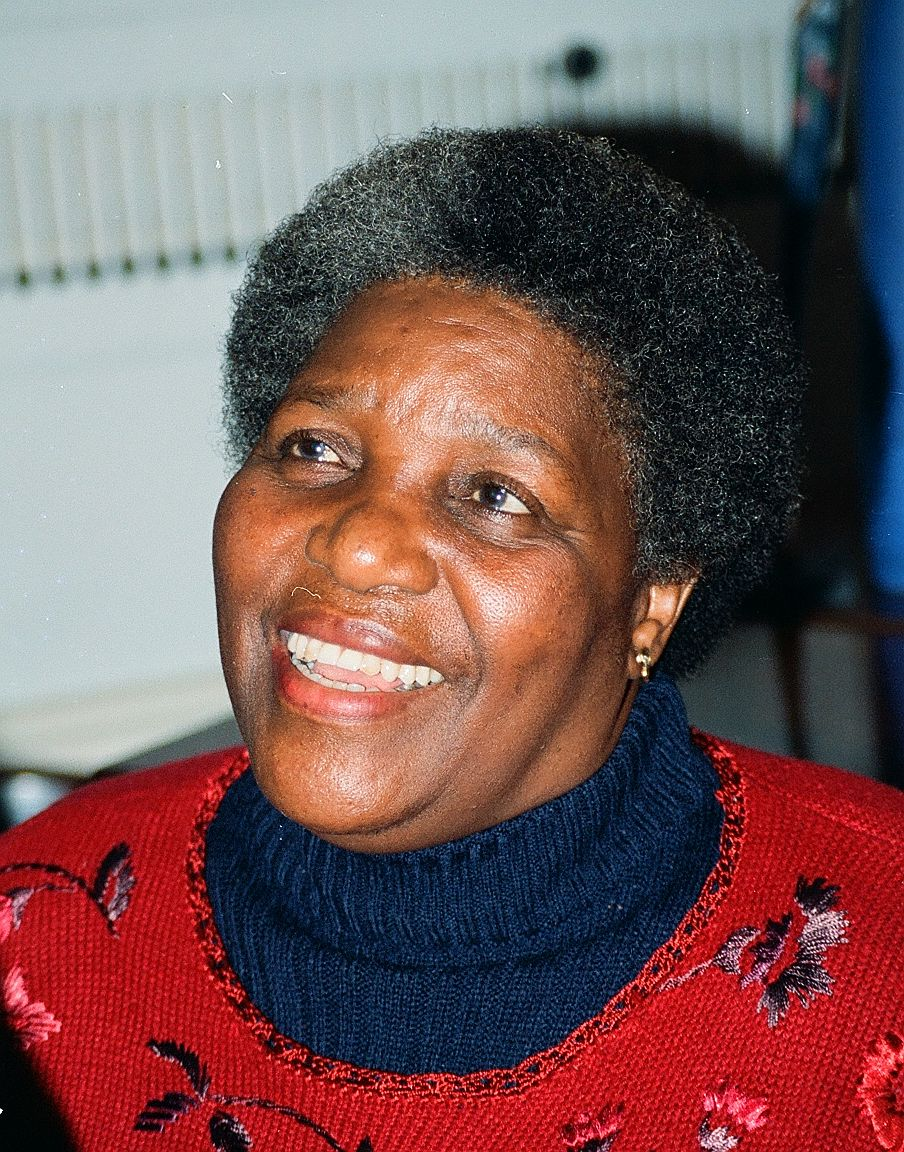
- Tutu in 1997
- Born: Nomalizo Leah Shenxane; 14 October 1933 (age 92); Krugersdorp, Union of South Africa
- Occupation: Activist
- Spouse: Desmond Tutu (m. 1955; died 2021)
- Children: 4; including Mpho Tutu van Furth

Nomalizo Leah Tutu (née Shenxane; born 14 October 1933) is a South African activist and the widow of Desmond Tutu.

== Life ==
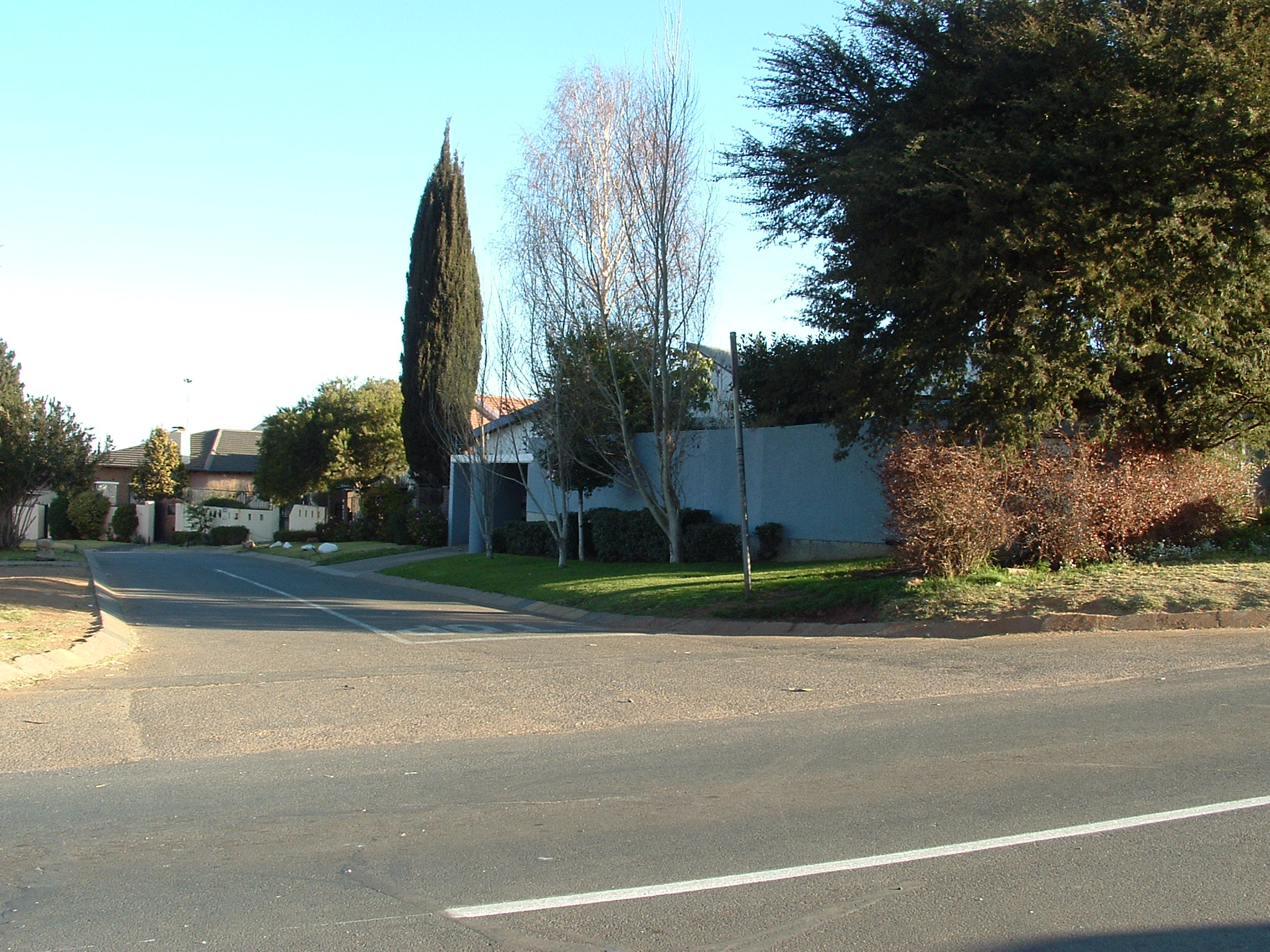
She lived for over 50 years at Tutu House which they extended in 1990

Tutu was born Nomalizo Leah Shenxane on 14 October 1933 in Krugersdorp, South Africa. She married Desmond Tutu on 2 July 1955. They had four children: Trevor Thamsanqa, Theresa Thandeka, Naomi Nontombi and Mpho Andrea, all of whom attended the Waterford Kamhlaba School in Swaziland. They have nine grandchildren: Palesa Tutu and Lizo Tutu via Trevor, Xabiso Gxashe via Thandeka, Tebogo Joy Ngoma, Nompumelelo Ngomane, and Mpilo Ngomane via Naomi, and Nyaniso Burris and Onalena Burris via Mpho. They renewed their marriage vows in 2015 in Orlando, Soweto. She underwent hip surgery in 2016.

== Career and activism ==
Leah Tutu was a teacher and a nurse. During the period between 1970 and 1972, she worked as an assistant to the registrar at the University of Botswana, Lesotho and Swaziland. She co-founded the South African Domestic Workers Association. She was the director of the Domestic Workers and Employers Project of the South African Institute of Race Relations from 1976 to 1984. She co-founded the Desmond Tutu Peace Center in 1988. She lectures to many churches and women's groups.

== Honours ==
In 2000, the National Louis University awarded Tutu an honorary doctorate, along with her husband. In 2009, she and her husband were awarded the Mattie J.T. Stepanek Peacemaker Award by the We Are Family Foundation.
