= Trudi Makhaya =

South African economist, entrepreneur and writer

- Born: Gertrude Makhaya; Hammanskraal, Gauteng, South Africa
- Education: St Antony's College, Oxford, MBA and MSc in developmental economics, 2002
- Alma mater: St Barnabas College
- Website: https://trudimakhaya.co.za

Gertrude “Trudi” Makhaya is a South African economist, entrepreneur, and writer. She is the economic advisor to President Cyril Ramaphosa, South Africa's current president. Makhaya previously worked at Deloitte, Genesis Analytics and AngloGold Ashanti in South Africa. She then worked the Competition Commission (South Africa) from 2010 to 2014. In 2015, Makhaya established Makhaya Advisory. Makhaya has several published papers, mainly focusing on competition economics and policy.

== Education and work ==
Makhaya was born and raised in Hammanskraal, Gauteng, South Africa. In 1996, Makhaya enrolled in St Barnabas College, in Bosmont, South Africa. She later received a Rhodes Scholarship and went to St Antony's College of Oxford University as a part of the class of 2002, obtaining an MBA and MSc in developmental economics. Makhaya also went to the University of Witwatersrand and obtained a BCom in Economics and Law, an honors degree in economics and a Masters in Economics.

During her employment at Deloitte, Genesis Analytics and AngloGold Ashanti, Makhaya worked in management consulting and also held corporate positions. In 2010, Makhaya joined the Competition Commission of South Africa, initially as a principal economist. She later held roles as a deputy commissioner and served as a member of the Competition Commission's executive committee. Her job at the Competition Commission was largely focused on competition economics and tasks included assessing competitive effects regarding business decisions as well as analyzing competition enforcement cases. Further tasks included representing the Competition Commission at the Competition Tribunal and serving as an expert witness. Makhaya was also a key figure in the imposing a fine of 1.46 billion rands on several construction companies involved in fraud to raise bids for stadiums for the 2010 FIFA World Cup during her time as deputy commissioner. In 2014, Makhaya left the Competition Commission.

Makhaya established an advisory firm in 2015 called Makhaya Advisory and currently serves as its CEO. The firm's focal points are entrepreneurship and competition policy. It supports new entrepreneurs with establishing their own businesses. Makhaya has further supported new businesses by advising new companies and offering financial by serving as an angel investor to start-up companies. Additionally, Makhaya worked at both MTN South Africa and Vumelana Advisory Fund in non-executive director positions.

In April 2018, Makhaya was appointed as President Cyril Ramaphosa's newest economic advisor. She was the youngest economic advisor in South Africa's history. Makhaya was tasked with organizing and delegating the work of the InvestSA Special Envoys who are to raise at least US$100 billion of international investments by 2023. Makhaya left her post at the end of a five-year term. Some reports suggested the President chose not to renew her contract, while others claimed it was her decision to leave. Some commentators have suggested that the investment pledges project Makhaya was tasked with leading was a failure based on 'empty promises'.

== Selected publications ==
=== "Competition, barriers to entry and inclusive growth – Capitec case study" (2015) ===
Makhaya co-authored this working paper with Nicholas Nhundu. The paper used Capitec Bank, a retail bank in South Africa, as a case study to analyze barriers to entry in the South African retail banking industry. Capitec's success relative to other entrants into the industry in 2008 was examined to determine which factors contributed to Capitec's success and which barriers Capitec had to overcome to achieve success.

The study found that Capitec's success led to competing banks to respond with implementations to compete with Capitec, as customers were choosing to switch to Capitec due to lower bank charges. Furthermore, customers of competing banks were offered lower costs to switch to Capitec. Convincing customers to switch saw Capitec overcoming a major barrier which was crucial to their success. The paper suggested that their use of a simple and understandable product and their persuading of lending clients to switch into being transactional banking clients, was a factor to their success. It was suggested in the paper that recommendations which arose from a market enquiry into banking also led to improved the competitive environment also contributed to Capitec's success. Despite the success of these methods, they concluded that the switching process could still be improved and among other improvements such as a stricter process to lead to adoption of innovation for future entrants.

=== "Expectations and outcomes: considering competition and corporate power in South Africa under democracy" (2013) ===
In this paper, Makhaya and co-author Simon Roberts analyzed changing corporate strategies and the competition law regime in South Africa. Case studies of three major industries were examined. They also analyzed the relationship between evolving corporate strategies and factors regarding market power protection and the effect of the competition authorities in South Africa's economy.

As South Africa's economy had long been developed under apartheid, the authors argued that there was a limited understanding of a competitive market in South African industries. Furthermore, the authors suggested that South Africa's laws and institutions continued to favour powerful corporations, the expectations of the competition policy were misunderstood, and there was no role for the state, thus the role of the competition policy was undermined and ineffective. The study found that the effects of the policies established during the apartheid era continued to hinder industries in South Africa despite new democratic governments and economic reform because the framework allowed incumbent businesses to protect their own interests while hopeful entrants were restricted entry into the market, to no avail of competition authorities. As a result, existing firms sought investors who would protect their place in the market while new shareholders attempted to maintain the status quo to protect the rents.

=== "How should young institutions approach competition enforcement? Reflections on South Africa's experience" (2012) ===
Makhaya co-authored this paper in collaboration with Simon Roberts and Wendy Mkwananzi. It examined South Africa's execution of competition policy following the establishment of the competition regime. The paper used South Africa as an example of success regarding competition policy for the implementation of competition law throughout Africa and highlighted two strategic areas one being the importance of market outcome analysis and the other regarding settlement frameworks. The paper mentioned that implementing stricter enforcement laws enabled the commission to uncover extensive fraudulent behaviour in the economy. Major findings in the paper were the key reasons for the commission's success, one being the corporate leniency policy and the other being proactive investigations which have been effective in detecting cartel activity.

The paper assessed the work of the South African Competition Commission since 1999, when it was created. They found that prioritizing initiation of investigations and incentivizing corporate leniency applications by corporations involved in fraudulent behavior were of significant important regarding the successful enforcement of cartels. This resulted in increased the credibility of the commission. These events led to successful cartel enforcement, one of the improvements in enforcement made by the Competition Commission. Another factor contributing to the Competition Commission's success found by the paper was the line of action taken regarding settlements with companies on good terms resulting in cooperating firms and favored competitive outcomes. They concluded that these factors contributed to Competition Commission's success as the competition authority of a developing country to handle the anti-competitive nature of existing South African businesses.

=== "Telecommunications in developing countries: reflections from the South African experience" (2003) ===
Written by Makhaya and Simon Roberts, this paper sought to examine debates surrounding privatization, international experience and economic development regarding South Africa's attempts to expand telecommunications service across the country while being in the process of privatizing telecommunications. The authors argued that despite the fact that advances in communication technologies in South Africa created opportunities for economic development there was also the risk of economic polarization that could result due to an uneven distribution of telecommunication services. Given the income inequalities in South Africa with respect to race, the authors suggested that these inequalities could be reflected with the extension of telecommunications services. However, the authors also provided evidence for the benefits to economic growth due to the expansion of telecommunications services. They analyzed South African's experience with the endeavor and examined the country's regulatory framework and privatization, the performance of one of its major networks, government interventions and regulations regarding telecommunications, and the effect telecommunications had on economic efficiency and universal service.

One of the study's conclusions was that private ownership and regulation did not address the extension of affordable telecommunications services to the South African population in an attempt to abolish existing inequalities, which the authors deemed as the biggest issue faced by South Africans. As the network Telkom favored profit maximization, switching from exclusivity to expanding service became useless as profit maximization made telecommunication services less affordable to the people who would supposedly benefit from the extension. In turn, exclusivity was found to increase Telkom's profitability.

Another conclusion was that Telkom was able to exploit its position in the industry because of competition issues being ignored during the process of privatization. This caused increased barriers to entry for new companies and undermined the effect of several factors on returns to the economy. The authors concluded that the South African experience suggested that a country's regulatory framework shaped the benefits received from reforming telecommunications services and that government intervention was required for the economy to benefit from the reform.

== Other endeavors ==
Makhaya is an avid writer. Some of her recent fiction work has been published. She also contributes public commentary by writing columns for both Business Day and Acumen.
