= Ezenzeleni Blind Institute =

School for the blind in Roodepoort, South Africa

Ezenzeli Blind Institute was a school for the blind in Roodepoort, near Johannesburg in South Africa. It was founded in 1939 by Arthur Blaxall, a British-born Anglican pastor who with his wife worked in South Africa since 1923.

Among the institute's teachers was Es'kia Mphahlele, who worked there in the 1940s. Desmond Tutu's mother Aletha worked there is a cook in the same period; it was there that Tutu met Trevor Huddleston.
