= The Prison Phoenix Trust =

English meditation and yoga charity

The Prison Phoenix Trust (PPT) is a charity registered in England in 1988 that offers help to prisoners through the disciplines of meditation and yoga, working with silence and the breath. The PPT encourages prisoners – and prison staff – to take up a daily practice and supports them with classes, free book, DVDs and CDs, and mentoring through personal correspondence. It also sends out quarterly peer-support newsletters, in which people in prison share their experiences, advice and encouragement with each other. The PPT is non-denominational and works with those of any religion or none.

The Trust trains and supports qualified yoga teachers for work in prisons, where they run yoga and meditation classes through substance misuse anger management education programs, paid from prison budgets. In 2024 it supported regular classes or workshops in 70 prisons in the UK and Ireland. Training events for teachers are held several times a year, and on alternate years the PPT delivers a 4-day teacher, training module for the British Wheel of Yoga, called "Teaching Yoga in Prison."

The PPT has its offices in Oxford and is run by two full-time and seven part-time staff, with the help of 35 volunteers. Its director is Selina Sasse.

== Origins ==
In 1986, Ann Wetherall, the PPT's founder, was working on a research project with Sir Alister Hardy at the Religious Experience Research Centre, Oxford, investigating spiritual experiences arising from imprisonment. This involved her in correspondence with many prisoners. Stemming from these letters, Ann discovered a spiritual hunger that was not being met from other sources. It occurred to her that being shut in cells for much of the day could provide prisoners with an opportunity to turn a negative situation into a positive one. Ann believed that if prisoners could be introduced to disciplines like meditation and yoga and supported in their efforts, they might feel differently about themselves.

The Trust was founded in 1988 and supported initially by The Princes Trust and The Gulbenkian Foundation. Its work is now funded by other Trusts and individual donors. Former patrons include Sir Stephen Tumim, who was Her Majesty's Chief Inspector of Prisons from 1987 to 1995.

== Patrons ==
- Dr Kiran Bedi IPS
- Dr Sheila Cassidy
- Shirley du Boulay
- Fr Laurence Freeman OSB
- Jeremy Irons
- Sir Mark Tully KBE

== Responses ==
Erwin James, a former life prisoner, writing in his regular column in The Guardian, described the effect of the yoga class in a prison:

The yoga teacher had brought peace and harmony to one of the closed prisons in which I had spent some difficult years. His gentle but determined tutoring had introduced a desperately needed method of relaxation to those who attended his class. More than that, he created a venue where case hardened prisoners could lower defences and communicate in the manner of ordinary people. His respectful attitude encouraged self-respect among his students, reminding us we were human and that it was ok to feel a mite vulnerable occasionally. I'm not sure if he ever realized it, but we took a great deal of what he taught us back to the landings and because of that I believe his good influence radiated in some measure throughout the wings.

== Books and CDs ==
The PPT has a range of books and CDs on yoga and meditation, which are sent on request to prisoners, free of charge.
These include:

- Becoming Free Through Meditation and Yoga by Sandy Chubb and Sister Elaine MacInnes published 1995 by the PPT
- Freeing the Spirit through Meditation and Yoga by Sandy Chubb, Korky Paul, and Sister Elaine MacInnes – published 2005 by the PPT ISBN 978-0-9550334-0-7 for inmates with basic reading skills.
- Clearing the Head, Relaxing the Body, Through Meditation and Yoga
- Yoga Without Words by Sandy Chubb, Korky Paul and Jo Child, 2008, The Prison Phoenix Trust ISBN 978-0-9550334-1-4

== Awards ==
Awarded Favorite Yoga Charity by readers of OM Yoga Magazine 2023 awards

Highly Commended for health and wellbeing in prisons in Inspire Justice Awards 2024

Highly Commended for long service in Oxfordshire Volunteer Awards 2024
