= St Joseph's Catholic and Anglican High School =

Christian secondary school in Wrexham, Wales

Coordinates: 53.03691°N 2.99722°W

- Ysgol Uwchradd Gatholig ac Anglicanaidd Sant Joseff (Welsh)

Location
- Sontley Road, Wrexham, Wrexham County Borough; LL13 7EN

Information
- School type: Voluntary Aided Comprehensive Secondary School
- Motto: The Way, The Truth, The Life
- Religious affiliations: Catholic & Anglican
- Established: 1958; 2006 (as a joint faith school)
- Local authority: Wrexham
- Head teacher: Christopher Wilkinson
- Age range: 11-16
- Enrollment: 751
- Language: English
- Colors: Purple and Yellow
- Website: stjosephs.wales

St Joseph's Catholic and Anglican High School (Welsh: Ysgol Uwchradd Gatholig ac Anglicanaidd Sant Joseff) is a secondary school in Wrexham, Wales, located on Sontley Road and situated on the edge of the Erddig estate. The school is opposite the Bishop of Wrexham's residence. It is currently the only shared Church school in Wales. The two Bishops of the Catholic Diocese of Wrexham and the Anglican Church in Wales Diocese of St. Asaph have a shared responsibility for the school.

== History ==
St Joseph's was opened in 1958 as St Joseph's Catholic Secondary Modern School. Headmaster - Mr Martin Cleary. In 1972 St Joseph's became a Comprehensive High School. It joined up with the Anglican church in 2006.

Originally there were three forms, or 'houses': Bishops, Abbots and Gwyns (named for the martyr St Richard Gwyn). Eventually these were renamed and expanded and for many years there were four forms: Hannon, Mostyn, Petit and Vaughan. Each was named after a Bishop of Menevia.

When the school gained joint church school status, the pupils were asked to vote for the new form names, based on contemporary religious icons. The following five names were chosen: Romero (after Óscar Romero), Cassidy (after Sheila Cassidy), Devereux (after Sean Devereux), Kolbe (after Maximilian Kolbe), King (after Martin Luther King Jr.).

In 2006 St Joseph's became a joint Anglican-Catholic school. The school has never been exclusively Catholic and has always (at least as far back as 1978) admitted non-Catholic students - mainly Anglicans.

The whole school Eucharists alternate between the two traditions.

The current headteacher is Mr Christopher Wilkinson. He was preceded by Mrs Maria B. Rimmer, the school's first female Headteacher (January 2010 - August 2016).

== Academics ==
The school introduces some new topics that are different from primary school such as French, German, Drama, and various technology subjects.

An official Welsh Assembly government inspection in spring 2008 awarded the school the maximum grading possible: seven grade ones. A 2020 Estyn report praised the school for ensuring "no pupil is left behind", rating all areas of performance at the school as either "good" or "excellent"; following a school inspection in February 2020.

== Controversies ==
In December 2021, during the COVID-19 pandemic, the school was accused of denying entry to pupils exempt from wearing face masks, mainly affecting disabled pupils; and criticised later for separating those exempt from wearing a face mask, with pupils that do wear face masks into a separate bubbles. The school responded stating they are following Welsh Government guidance and implementing the necessary procedures to keep pupils safe.
