= The Book of Joy =

Book by Abrams, Tutu, and the Dalai Lama

- Author: Tenzin Gyatso, Desmond Tutu & Douglas Abrams
- Language: English
- Genre: self help
- Publisher: Cornerstone Publishers
- Publication date: 22 September 2016
- Pages: 368
- ISBN: 978-0-399-18504-5 (Hardcover)

The Book of Joy: Lasting Happiness in a Changing World is a book by the Nobel Peace Prize Laureates Tenzin Gyatso, the 14th Dalai Lama, and Archbishop Desmond Tutu published in 2016 by Cornerstone Publishers. In this nonfiction, the authors discuss the challenges of living a joyful life. The book focuses on the theme that fear, anger, and hatred exist internally as much as externally.

== Reception ==
In 2021, Netflix released the film Mission: Joy - Finding Happiness in Troubled Times, based on the book. A children's edition of the book, titled The Little Book of Joy, was released in 2022.
