= St Barnabas College =

St Barnabas College may refer to:

- St Barnabas College (Adelaide), Australia
- St Barnabas College (Johannesburg), South Africa
- Rodrigues College, formerly St Barnabas College, Mauritius
