= Shirley du Boulay =

British author and biographer

Shirley du Boulay (4 March 1933 – 7 March 2023) was a British author and biographer, resident of Oxford.

Educated at Downe House School and the Royal College of Music, she embarked on a career with the BBC in 1954, initially as a studio manager, then becoming a programme producer of Radio 4's 'Woman's Hour'. She moved to television and specialized in religious programming.

She resigned from the BBC in 1978, and started to work as an author. Her biographical subjects tend to be individuals who have taken a spiritual journey of their own, and whose subsequent influence has been important.

She was married to the former Jesuit priest and columnist for The Tablet, John Harriott, until his death at the end of 1990.

Her interests included psychology, music, walking, gardening and meditation. She was a patron of the Prison Phoenix Trust and a Trustee of the Oxford Zendo.

Her books have been translated into French, Japanese, German, Italian, Dutch and Polish.

== Chapters in books or publications ==
- Letting Go - A Way to Freedom in Harvest, Journal for Jungian Studies, Analytical Psychology Club, Number 24, 1978, London, 1978
- Journey of Faith in No Place to Hide, Journeys in Faith, Omega Trust Publications, 1993
- Bede Griffiths and the one universal reality in Contemporary Spiritualities, edited by Clive Erricker and Jane Erricker, Continuum, 2001
- Teresa of Avila (1512–82) in Spiritual Stars of the Millennium, edited by Selina O'Grady and John Wilkins, Continuum, 2001
- Truth beyond Division: Eastern Meditation and Western Christianity in Unfinished Journey, The Church 40 years after Vatican II, edited by Austen Ivereigh, Continuum, 2003
- Chapter on Bede Griffiths in Visionaries of the 20th Century, A Resurgence Anthology, edited by Satish Kumar and Freddie Whitefield, Green Books, 2006.
- Entry on Bede Griffiths in the Oxford Dictionary of National Biography, 2007 edition.
- Arunachala, Religion and the Arts in A Journal from Boston College, Volume 12-1-3 (2008), Special Issue: The inter-religious imagination, Brill, 2008
- Contributor to Life in Abundance, The CAFOD Christian Aid Lent Book - Darton, Longman and Todd, 2009

== Books ==
- Cicely Saunders: The Founder of the Modern Hospice Movement - Hodder & Stoughton, 1984.
- The Gardeners - Hodder & Stoughton, 1985.
- Changing the Face of Death: The Story of Dame Cicely Saunders - Chansitor Publications, 1985.
- The World Walks by: The Life of Baroness Masham of Ilton (Coauthor) - Collins, 1986.
- Tutu, Voice of the Voiceless - Hodder & Stoughton, 1988.
- Teresa of Avila: An Extraordinary Life - Hodder & Stoughton, 1991.
- The Road to Canterbury: A Modern Pilgrimage - Morehouse Group, 1995.
- Beyond the Darkness: A Biography of Bede Griffiths - Random House, 1998.
- The Cave of the Heart: The Life of Swami Abhishiktananda - Orbis Books, 2005.
- Swami Abhishiktananda: Essential Writings - Orbis Books, 2006
- A Silent Melody: An Experience of Contemporary Spiritual Life - Darton, Longman & Todd, 2014
