= Sheila Cassidy =

English doctor (born 1937)

- Born: Sheila Anne Cassidy; 18 August 1937 (age 89); Cranwell, Lincolnshire, England
- Education: Somerville College, Oxford
- Occupation: Doctor
- Known for: Work in hospice movement

Sheila Anne Cassidy (born 18 August 1937) is an English doctor, known for her work in the hospice movement, as a writer and as someone who, by publicising her own history as a torture survivor, drew attention to human rights abuse in Chile in the 1970s.

== Early life and education ==
Born in Cranwell, Lincolnshire, England, to Air Vice-Marshal John Reginald Cassidy (1892–1974) and Barbara Margaret Cassidy, Cassidy grew up in Sydney, Australia, and attended the Our Lady of Mercy College in Parramatta, a suburb of Sydney. She began her medical studies at the University of Sydney, where she was a resident at Sancta Sophia College and completed them at Somerville College, Oxford, in 1963. She wanted to become a plastic surgeon but could not keep up with the 90-hour week, so she left school.

== Career ==
Cassidy went to practise medicine in Chile during the government of Salvador Allende.

In 1975, Cassidy was caught up in the violence of the Pinochet regime. She gave medical care to Nelson Gutiérrez, a political opponent of the new regime who was being sought by the police. As a result, she was herself arrested on 1 November 1975 by the Chilean secret police, the DINA, and kept in custody without trial. During the early part of her custody, she was severely tortured in the notorious Villa Grimaldi near Santiago, Chile, to force her to disclose information about her patient and her other contacts.

Later in 1975, Cassidy was released from custody and returned to the UK with the assistance of the British government and Roberto Kozak. Her subsequent description of her experiences, including her account of her torture on the parrilla (electric shock device where the victim is strapped to a metal frame or "grill") and her imprisonment, did much to bring to the attention of the UK public the widespread human rights abuses that were occurring at the time in Chile. Her story appeared in news media and in her 1977 book, Audacity to Believe.

== Later life ==
After a period of recovery from the physical and psychological effects of her ordeal (during which she briefly became a nun), Cassidy continued to practise as a doctor. In 1982, she became Medical Director of the new St Luke's Hospice in Plymouth, a position that she held for 15 years. She went on to set up a palliative care service for the Plymouth hospitals. While at St Luke's, Cassidy sat for a life-size portrait study in 1982 by painter Robert Lenkiewicz (1941–2002).

Cassidy has written a number of books on Christian subjects and has been involved with a number of charitable organisations, such as patronage of The Prison Phoenix Trust. In her book Confessions of a Lapsed Catholic, she outlines the reasons that caused her to withdraw her allegiance from the Catholic Church.

Sheila Cassidy now has a Form named after her in St Joseph's Catholic & Anglican High School, Wrexham.

== See also ==
- 1973 Chilean coup d'état
