= St Barnabas College (Johannesburg) =

Secondary school in Johannesburg, South Africa

St Barnabas College is a secondary school in Johannesburg, South Africa. It was founded in 1963, and was the first school in South Africa that was open to all races.
