= List of Pittsburgh Pirates first-round draft picks =

The Pittsburgh Pirates are a Major League Baseball (MLB) franchise based in Pittsburgh, Pennsylvania. They play in the National League Central division. Since the establishment of the Rule 4 Draft the Pirates have selected 72 players in the first round. Officially known as the "First-Year Player Draft", the Rule 4 Draft is MLB's primary mechanism for assigning players from high schools, colleges, and other amateur clubs to its franchises. The draft order is determined based on the previous season's standings, with the team possessing the worst record receiving the first pick. In addition, teams which lost free agents in the previous off-season may be awarded compensatory or supplementary picks.

Of these 72 players, 27 have been pitchers, the most of any position; 20 of these were right-handed, while 7 were left-handed. 17 outfielders and 15 shortstops were selected. The Pirates have also drafted 7 catchers, 3 first basemen, and 3 third basemen, but have never selected a second baseman in the first round. Eleven players came from high schools or universities in the state of California, while eight came from Florida.

Three Pirates' first-round picks have won championships with the franchise. Richie Hebner (1966) won a World Series title on the 1971 championship team, and Steve Nicosia (1973) and Dale Berra (1975) won with the 1979 team (though Berra did not appear in the World Series). Paul Skenes (2023) is the Pirates' only first-round pick to ever win the Rookie of the Year Award, doing so in 2024. None of their picks have been elected to the Baseball Hall of Fame, but Barry Bonds (1985) won seven Most Valuable Player awards, more than any other player, including two with Pittsburgh. Bonds also won 12 Silver Sluggers, 8 Gold Gloves, and holds both the single-season and career home run records (73 and 762). The Pirates have made fourteen selections in the supplemental round of the draft and have made the first overall selection six times (1986, 1996, 2002, 2011, 2021, and 2023). The Pirates also had the first overall pick in the 2023 Major League Baseball draft after winning the inaugural draft lottery.

The Pirates have failed 3 times in signing a first-round draft pick. This first occurred in 2012, when the Pirates selected RHP Mark Appel from Stanford University, who sought a significant bonus which, according to new MLB rules, would have cost the Pirates a future draft pick. The Pirates received the 9th overall pick in the 2013 draft for their failure to sign Appel.

Pedro Álvarez (2009) nearly went unsigned as he faced a contentious process in which Álvarez and the Pirates reached an initial deal after the signing deadline (with permission from MLB); his agent Scott Boras and the Players Association filed a grievance challenging this post-deadline deal, and ultimately the Pirates renegotiated a deal with him in September that year. The Pirates have had ten compensatory picks overall since the first draft in 1965. These additional picks are provided when a team loses a particularly valuable free agent in the previous off-season,^{[V]} or, more recently, if a team fails to sign a draft pick from the previous year.

== Key ==
Year	Each year links to an article about that year's Major League Baseball draft.
Position	Indicates the secondary/collegiate position at which the player was drafted, rather than the professional position the player may have gone on to play
Pick	Indicates the number of the pick
*	Player did not sign with the Pirates
§	Indicates a supplemental pick
'71	Player was a member of the Pirates' 1971 championship team
'79	Player was a member of the Pirates' 1979 championship team

== Picks ==
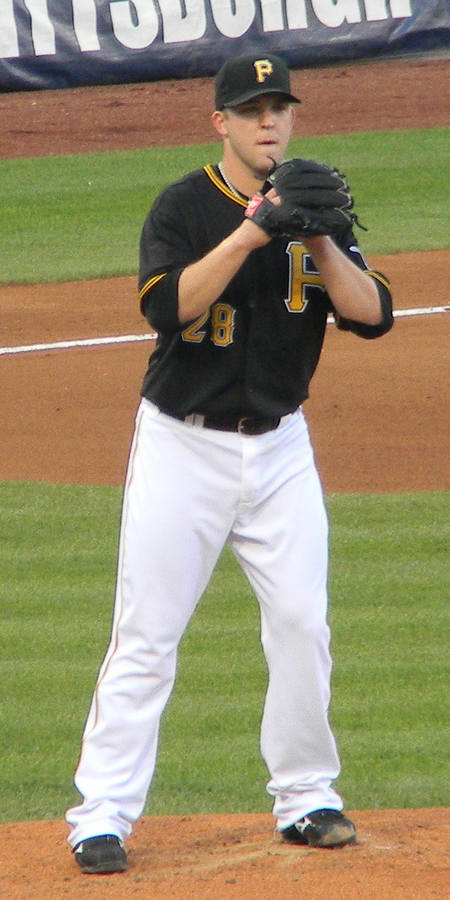
Paul Maholm (2003) was one of 19 pitchers taken by Pittsburgh in the first round.

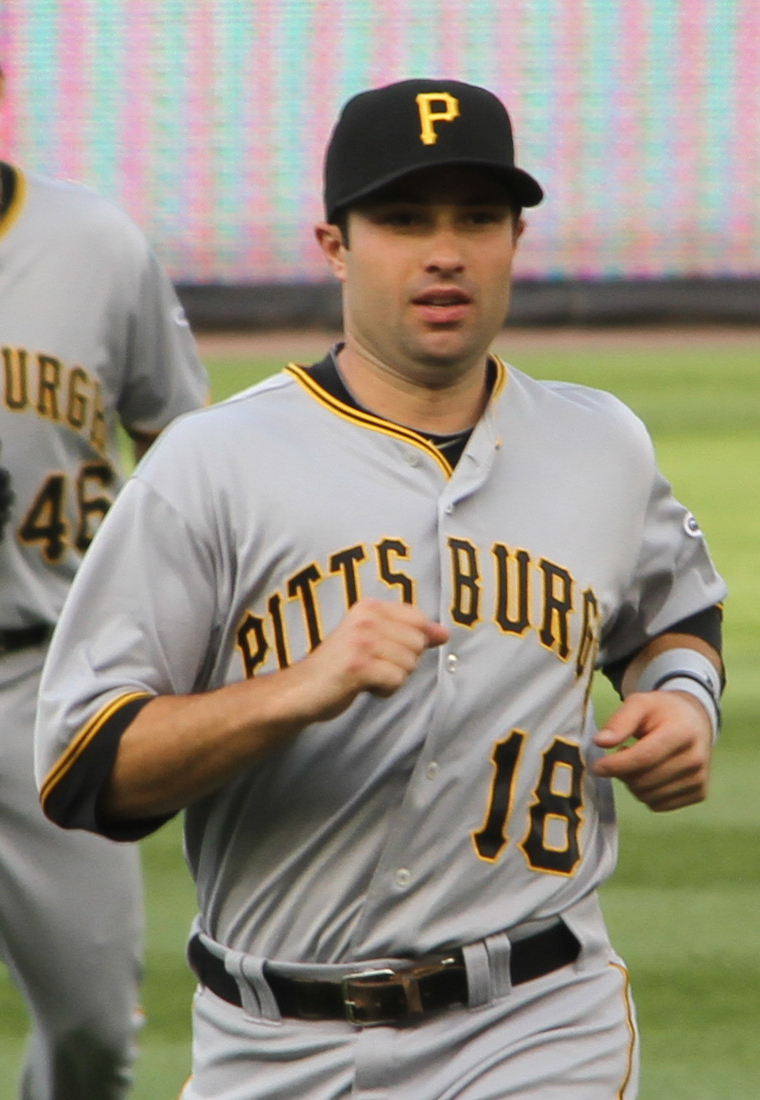
Neil Walker (2004) is the only player the Pirates have drafted in the first round from their home state of Pennsylvania.

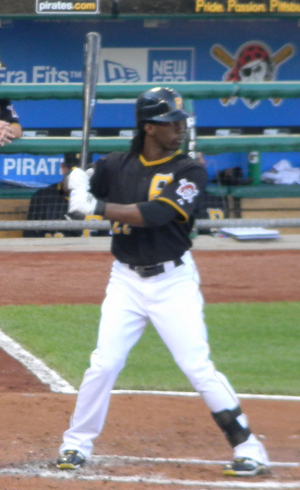
Andrew McCutchen (2005) was one of seven players from Florida taken by the Pirates in the first round.

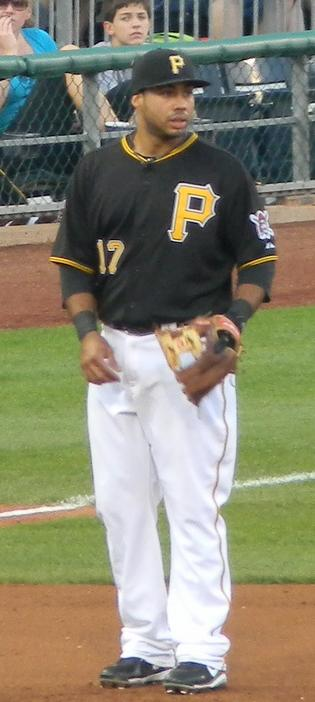
Pedro Alvarez (2009) faced a contentious signing process, only finally reaching a contract agreement well after the original signing deadline.

Year	Name	Position	School (Location)	Pick	Ref
1965	Doug Dickerson	Outfielder	Ensley High School (Birmingham, Alabama)	10	
1966	Richie Hebner '71	Shortstop	Norwood High School (Norwood, Massachusetts)	15	
1967	Joe Grigas	Outfielder	Coyle High School (Brockton, Massachusetts)	16	
1968	Dick Sharon	Outfielder	Sequoia High School (Redwood City, California)	9	
1969	John Morlan	Right-handed pitcher	Merritt Island High School (Merritt Island, Florida)	10	
1970	John Bedard	Right-handed pitcher	Springfield Tech High School (Springfield, Massachusetts)	13	
1971	Craig Reynolds	Shortstop	Regan High School (Houston, Texas)	22	
1972	Dwayne Peltier	Shortstop	Servite High School (Anaheim, California)	23	
1973	Steve Nicosia '79	Catcher	North Miami Beach High School (Opa-locka, Florida)	24	
1974	Rod Scurry	Left-handed pitcher	Procter Hug High School (Reno, Nevada)	11	
1975	Dale Berra '79	Shortstop	Montclair High School (Montclair, New Jersey)	20	
1976	Jim Parke	Right-handed pitcher	Henry Ford II High School (Sterling Heights, Michigan)	21	
1977	Anthony Nicely	Outfielder	Meadowdale High School (Dayton, Ohio)	18	
1978	Brad Garnett	First baseman	DeSoto High School (DeSoto, Texas)	18	
1978	Gerry Aubin	Outfielder	Dougherty High School (Albany, Georgia)	21^{[a]}	
1979	no first-round pick^{[b]}				
1980	Rich Renteria	Shortstop	South Gate High School (South Gate, California)	20^{[c]}	
1981	Jim Winn	Right-handed pitcher	John Brown University (Siloam Springs, Arkansas)	14	
1982	Sam Khalifa	Shortstop	Sahuaro High School (Tucson, Arizona)	7	
1983	Ron DeLucchi	Outfielder	Campolindo High School (Moraga, California)	12	
1984	Kevin Andersh	Left-handed pitcher	University of New Mexico (Albuquerque, New Mexico)	15	
1985	Barry Bonds	Outfielder	Arizona State University (Tempe, Arizona)	6	
1986	Jeff King	Shortstop	University of Arkansas (Fayetteville, Arkansas)	1	
1987	Mark Merchant	Outfielder	Oviedo High School (Oviedo, Florida)	2	
1988	Austin Manahan	Shortstop	Horizon High School (Scottsdale, Arizona)	13	
1989	Willie Greene	Shortstop	Jones County High School (Gray, Georgia)	18	
1990	Kurt Miller	Right-handed pitcher	West High School (Bakersfield, California)	5	
1990	Mike Zimmerman	Right-handed pitcher	University of South Alabama (Mobile, Alabama)	27^{§}^{[d]}	
1991	Jon Farrell	Catcher	Florida Junior College (Jacksonville, Florida)	24	
1992	Jason Kendall	Catcher	Torrance High School (Torrance, California)	23	
1992	Shon Walker	Outfielder	Harrison County High School (Cynthiana, Kentucky)	33^{§}^{[e]}	
1993	Charles Peterson	Outfielder	Laurens District High School (Laurens, South Carolina)	22	
1993	Jermaine Allensworth	Outfielder	Purdue University (West Lafayette, Indiana)	34^{§}^{[f]}	
1993	Andy Rice	First baseman	Parker High School (Birmingham, Alabama)	42^{§}^{[g]}	
1994	Mark Farris	Shortstop	Angleton High School (Angleton, Texas)	10	
1995	Chad Hermansen	Shortstop	Green Valley High School (Henderson, Nevada)	10	
1996	Kris Benson	Right-handed pitcher	Clemson University (Clemson, South Carolina)	1	
1997	J. J. Davis	First baseman	Baldwin Park High School (Baldwin Park, California)	8	
1998	Clint Johnson	Left-handed pitcher	Vanderbilt University (Nashville, Tennessee)	15	
1999	Bobby Bradley	Right-handed pitcher	Wellington Community High School (Wellington, Florida)	8	
2000	Sean Burnett	Left-handed pitcher	Wellington Community High School (Wellington, Florida)	19	
2001	John Van Benschoten	Right-handed pitcher	Kent State University (Kent, Ohio)	8	
2002	Bryan Bullington	Right-handed pitcher	Ball State University (Muncie, Indiana)	1	
2003	Paul Maholm	Left-handed pitcher	Mississippi State University (Mississippi State, Mississippi)	8	
2004	Neil Walker	Catcher	Pine Richland High School (Gibsonia, Pennsylvania)	11	
2005	Andrew McCutchen	Outfielder	Fort Meade High School (Fort Meade, Florida)	11	
2006	Brad Lincoln	Right-handed pitcher	University of Houston (Houston, Texas)	4	
2007	Daniel Moskos	Left-handed pitcher	Clemson University (Clemson, South Carolina)	4	
2008	Pedro Álvarez	Third baseman	Vanderbilt University (Nashville, Tennessee)	2	
2009	Tony Sánchez	Catcher	Boston College (Chestnut Hill, Massachusetts)	4	
2009	Victor Black	Right-handed pitcher	Dallas Baptist University (Dallas, Texas)	49^{§}^{[h]}	
2010	Jameson Taillon	Right-handed pitcher	The Woodlands High School (The Woodlands, Texas)	2	
2011	Gerrit Cole	Right-handed pitcher	University of California, Los Angeles (Los Angeles, California)	1	
2012	Mark Appel*	Right-handed pitcher	Stanford University (Stanford, California)	8	
2012	Barrett Barnes	Outfielder	Texas Tech University (Lubbock, Texas)	45^{§}^{[i]}	
2013	Austin Meadows	Outfielder	Grayson High School (Loganville, Georgia)	9^{§}^{[j]}	
2013	Reese McGuire	Catcher	Kentwood High School (Covington, Washington)	14	
2014	Cole Tucker	Shortstop	Mountain Pointe High School (Phoenix, Arizona)	24	
2014	Connor Joe	Outfielder	University of San Diego (San Diego, California)	39^{§}^{[k]}	
2015	Kevin Newman	Shortstop	University of Arizona (Tucson, Arizona)	19	
2015	Ke'Bryan Hayes	Third baseman	Concordia Lutheran High School (Tomball, Texas)	45^{§}^{[l]}	
2016	Will Craig	Third baseman	Wake Forest University (Winston-Salem, North Carolina)	22	
2016	Nick Lodolo*	Right-handed pitcher	Damien High School (La Verne, California)	41^{§}^{[m]}	
2017	Shane Baz	Right-handed pitcher	Concordia Lutheran High School (Tomball, Texas)	12	
2018	Travis Swaggerty	Outfielder	University of South Alabama (Mobile, Alabama)	10	
2018	Gunnar Hoglund*	Right-handed pitcher	Fivay High School (Hudson, Florida)	36^{§}^{[n]}	
2019	Quinn Priester	Right-handed pitcher	Cary-Grove High School (Cary, Illinois)	18	
2019	Sammy Siani	Center Fielder	William Penn Senior High School (Philadelphia, Pennsylvania)	37^{§}^{[o]}	
2020	Nick Gonzales	Shortstop	New Mexico State University (Las Cruces, New Mexico)	7	
2021	Henry Davis	Catcher	University of Louisville (Louisville, Kentucky)	1	
2021	Carmen Mlodzinski	Right-handed pitcher	University of South Carolina (Columbia, South Carolina)	31^{§}^{[p]}	
2022	Termarr Johnson	Shortstop	Mays High School (Atlanta, Georgia)	4	
2022	Tom Harrington	Right-handed pitcher	Campbell University (Buies Creek, North Carolina)	36^{§}^{[q]}	
2023	Paul Skenes	Right-handed pitcher	LSU (Baton Rouge, Louisiana)	1	
2024	Konnor Griffin	Shortstop	Jackson Prep School (Jackson, Mississippi)	9	
2025	Seth Hernandez	Right-handed pitcher	Corona High School (Corona, California)	6	
2026	Derek Curiel	Outfielder	LSU (Baton Rouge, Louisiana)	5	

== See also ==
- Pittsburgh Pirates minor league players

== Footnotes ==
- ^{V} Through the 2012 draft, free agents were evaluated by the Elias Sports Bureau and rated "Type A", "Type B", or not compensation-eligible. If a team offered arbitration to a player but that player refused and subsequently signed with another team, the original team was able to receive additional draft picks. If a "Type A" free agent left in this way, his previous team received a supplemental pick and a compensatory pick from the team with which he signed. If a "Type B" free agent left in this way, his previous team received only a supplemental pick. Since the 2013 draft, free agents are no longer classified by type; instead, compensatory picks are only awarded if the team offered its free agent a contract worth at least the average of the 125 current richest MLB contracts. However, if the free agent's last team acquired the player in a trade during the last year of his contract, it is ineligible to receive compensatory picks for that player.
- ^{a} The Pirates gained a compensatory first-round pick in 1978 from the Los Angeles Dodgers as compensation for losing free agent Terry Forster.
- ^{b} The Pirates lost their first-round pick in 1979 to the Los Angeles Dodgers as compensation for signing free agent Lee Lacy.
- ^{c} The Pirates gained a compensatory first-round pick in 1980 from the Los Angeles Angels as compensation for losing free agent Bruce Kison.
- ^{d} The Pirates gained a supplemental first-round pick in 1990 for losing free agent Jim Gott.
- ^{e} The Pirates gained a supplemental first-round pick in 1992 for losing free agent Bobby Bonilla.
- ^{f} The Pirates gained a supplemental first-round pick in 1993 for losing free agent Doug Drabek.
- ^{g} The Pirates gained a supplemental first-round pick in 1993 for losing free agent Barry Bonds.
- ^{h} The Pirates gained a supplemental first-round pick in 2009 for failing to sign Tanner Scheppers.
- ^{i} The Pirates gained a supplemental first-round pick in 2012 for losing free agent Ryan Doumit.
- ^{j} The Pirates gained a supplemental first-round pick in 2013 for failing to sign Mark Appel.
- ^{k} Competitive Balance pick
- ^{l} The Pirates gained a compensatory first-round pick in 2015 for losing free agent Russell Martin.
- ^{m} Competitive Balance pick
- ^{n} Competitive Balance pick
- ^{o} Competitive Balance pick
- ^{p} Competitive Balance pick
- ^{q} Competitive Balance pick
