= Glanton (surname) =

Glanton is a surname. Notable people with the surname include:

- Adarius Glanton (born 1990), American football player
- De'Mon Glanton (born 1986), American football player
- John Joel Glanton (1819–1850), American soldier and outlaw
- Mike Glanton (born 1960), American politician
- Willie Stevenson Glanton (1923–2017), American lawyer and politician
