= Henry Spalding =

Henry Spalding may refer to:

- Henry H. Spalding (1803–1874), Presbyterian missionary
- Henry Spalding (architect) (1838–1910), British architect
- Henry S. Spalding (1865–1934), author
