= Fatima Cody Stanford =

American obesity medicine physician

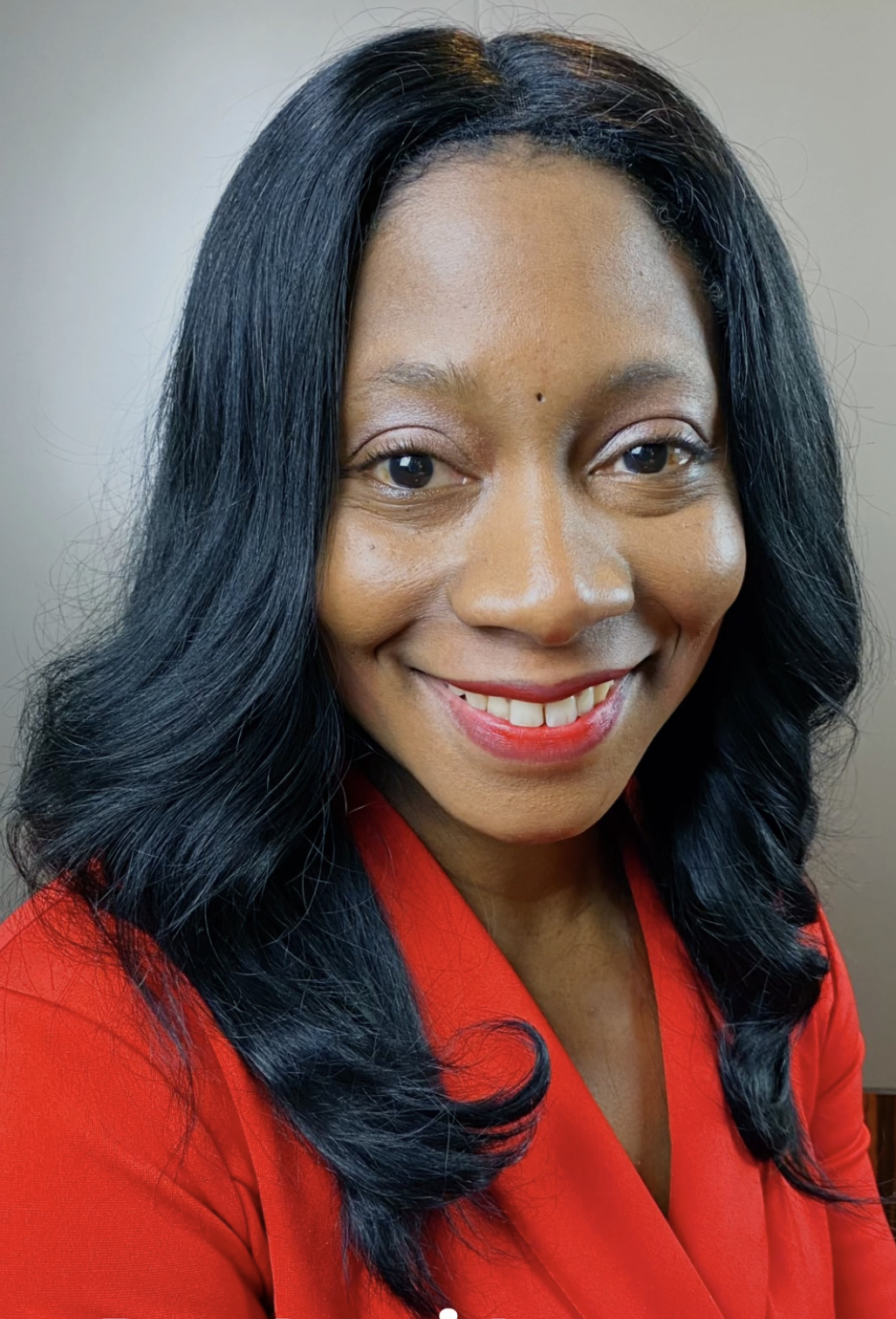
- Stanford in 2022
- Born: Atlanta, Georgia, U.S.
- Education: Quantic School of Business and Technology (MBA); Harvard University (MPA); Medical College of Georgia (MD); Emory University (BS, MPH)
- Known for: Obesity medicine
- Scientific career
- Workplaces: Harvard Medical School
- Website: askdrfatima.com

External videos
- "Breakthrough Women in Science & Medicine: Dr. Fatima Cody Stanford", PBS.

Fatima Cody Stanford is an American obesity medicine physician, internist, and pediatrician and an Associate Professor of medicine and pediatrics at Harvard Medical School. She is one of the most highly cited scientists in the field of obesity. She is recognized for shifting the global perception of obesity as a chronic disease.

== Early life and education ==
Stanford was born and raised in Atlanta, Georgia, and she attended the Atlanta Public Schools where she was valedictorian of Benjamin E. Mays High School and finalist in the International Science and Engineering Fair. She received a Martin Luther King Scholarship to complete undergraduate studies at Emory University, and also completed a Master of Public Health degree at the same university. She is a Diamond Life Member of Delta Sigma Theta.

Stanford completed her medical training at the Medical College of Georgia, where she was the first black class president. She completed her medical residency at the University of South Carolina and her fellowship in obesity medicine at Massachusetts General Hospital and Harvard Medical School. She completed her Master of Public Administration at the Harvard Kennedy School of Government as a Zuckerman Fellow in the Center for Public Leadership and her Executive Master of Business Administration at Quantic School of Business and Technology.

== Career ==
She has served as the chair of the Minority Affairs Section (MAS) for the American Medical Association, chair of the American College of Physicians Obesity Advisory Committee, executive committee member of the American Academy of Pediatrics Section on Obesity, The Obesity Society Advocacy, Public Affairs, and Regulatory Board of Directors member, the American Board of Obesity Medicine Outreach and Awareness Committee, and the Massachusetts Chapter of the American Heart Association Board of Directors.

She is the director of scholarly engagement and mentoring for the Nutrition Obesity Research Center at Harvard (NORCH). Through the NIH, she serves as the director of the Nutrition Obesity Research Center (NORC) working group on workforce diversity.

Stanford's research focuses on the utilization of anti-obesity pharmacotherapy after bariatric surgery, outcomes and utility of adolescent bariatric surgery, pharmacotherapy for the treatment for obesity, the effectiveness of calorie counting, the appropriateness of body mass index (BMI) as a measure of health, and physician education and training in obesity care. She has also published work in COVID-19 disparities with Esther Duflo and Marcella Alsan.

Stanford has conducted interviews with the New York Times, USA Today, Time, U.S. News & World Report, Glamour, and NPR. On January 1, 2023, Stanford appeared on 60 Minutes with Lesley Stahl, stating obesity is a chronic disease and that there is physician bias against those with excess weight As part of a panel with Deborah Roberts on addressing weight stigma, Dr. Stanford advocated for elimation of bias towards those with higher weights. Oprah Winfrey interviewed Dr. Stanford as an obesity expert for her "The Life You Want Class: The State of the Weight" on Oprah Daily. In this interview, Stanford teaches about the science of obesity as a chronic disease. In an interview with Sanjay Gupta for his CNN Chasing life podcast, she coined the term "street corner medicine" to refer to the assumption that people judge people based on their size—they assume that heavier people are unhealthy and leaner people are healthy without investigating whether this is factual by evaluating metabolic health parameters such as blood pressure, cholesterol, liver function tests, blood sugar, etc.

Dr. Stanford was featured as a leading voice at the NY Times Deal Book Summit alongside the CEO of Eli Lilly, Dave Ricks, as they discussed the role of GLP-1 receptor agonist in obesity treatment.

Stanford was a deputy editor for Contemporary Clinical Trials.

In 2018, Stanford said she was racially profiled when administering medical assistance to a fellow passenger on a Delta Air Lines flight. Flight attendants did not believe that she was a physician despite her presenting her medical license to them.

The United States Department of Health and Human Services and United States Department of Agriculture named Dr. Stanford to the 2025 Dietary Guidelines for Americans Advisory Committee as one of 20 nationally recognized nutrition and public health experts.

In 2025, she and over 55 international commissioners, led by Dr. Francesco Rubino, proposed a new definition and diagnostic criteria for obesity. The specific aim of the Lancet Commission was to establish objective criteria for disease diagnosis, aiding clinical decision-making and prioritization of therapeutic interventions and public health strategies.

A PBS documentary titled "Breakthrough: Women in Science & Medicine – Dr. Fatima Cody Stanford" was developed to highlight Dr. Stanford's career and contributions to the fields of obesity medicine and health equity. The program explores her research, clinical work, and advocacy.

She is an independent board member for Eolo Pharma.

== Books ==
- Facing Overweight and Obesity: A Complete Guide for Children and Adults with J.R. Stevens and T.A. Stern (Mass General Hospital Psychiatry Academy, February 4, 2019)
- Deja Review: Behavioral Sciences, 1st Edition (McGraw Hill, November 1, 2006)

== Honors and awards ==
- 1995: International Science and Engineering Fair Finalist
- 1996: Emory University Martin Luther King Jr. Scholar
- 2001: United States Congressional Award
- 2005: American Medical Association Foundation Leadership Award
- 2013: American College of Physicians Joseph E. Johnson Leadership Award
- 2013: National Institutes of Health Loan Repayment Program- Disparities
- 2014: Harvard University Zuckerman Fellow
- 2015: Fellow, The Obesity Society
- 2016: National Minority Quality Forum Top 40 under 40 in Minority Health
- 2016: Massachusetts General Hospital Department of Medicine Sanchez and Ferguson Research Faculty Award
- 2017: Harvard Medical School Harold Amos Faculty Diversity Award
- 2017: Massachusetts Medical Society Women's Health Award
- 2017: Emory University Top 40 Under 40
- 2017: Massachusetts General Hospital Physician Scientist Development Award
- 2018: National Institutes of Health Loan Repayment Program- Clinical Research
- 2019: Massachusetts Medical Society Suffolk Community Clinician of the Year
- 2020: Massachusetts General Hospital Anne Klibanski Visiting Scholar Award
- 2020: The Obesity Society Clinician of the Year for Excellence in Clinical Management of Obesity
- 2021: American Medical Women's Association Fellow
- 2021: Massachusetts Medical Society Grant V. Rodkey Award for Outstanding Contributions to Medical Education
- 2021: Harvard Medical School Young Mentor Award
- 2021: Nutrition Obesity Research Center at Harvard Outstanding Manuscript Award
- 2021: Academy of Nutrition and Dietetics Friend of Weight Management Dietetic Practice Group Award
- 2021: American Medical Association Pride of the Profession Award
- 2021: Emory Rollins School of Public Health Distinguished Alumni Award
- 2021: Nutrition Obesity Research Center at Harvard (NORCH) Mentoring for Diversity and Inclusion Award
- 2022: Georgia Society of Endocrinology Dr. Anthony E. Karpas Memorial Lecture Award
- 2022: National Academy of Medicine Scholar in Diagnostic Excellence
- 2023: Dietary Guidelines for Americans Advisory Committee
- 2024: Royal Society of Medicine Fellow
- 2024: Sigma Xi Member
- 2024: Walgreens Clinical Trials Award
- 2024: National Medical Association Meritorious Achievement Award
- 2024: American College of Physicians Mastership
