= Donald L. Weaver =

American physician

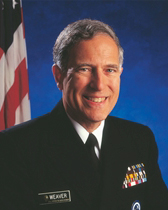
- Official portrait, 2009

Surgeon General of the United States Acting
- In office 1 October 2009 – 3 November 2009
- President: Barack Obama
- Preceded by: Steven K. Galson (acting)
- Succeeded by: Regina Benjamin

Personal details
- Education: Harvard University (MD)

Military service
- Allegiance: United States
- Branch/service: U.S. Public Health Service
- Rank: Rear Admiral
- Unit: USPHS Commissioned Corps

Donald L. Weaver is an American physician. He is a rear admiral in the United States Public Health Service Commissioned Corps and public health administrator who served as the acting Surgeon General of the United States. Weaver succeeded Steven K. Galson in October 2009, in expectation of a holdup by the United States Senate in confirming Regina Benjamin as surgeon general. Before being appointed as Acting Surgeon General, he served as the deputy associate administrator for primary health care in the Health Resources and Services Administration.

== Education ==
Weaver is a 1973 graduate of Harvard Medical School, and also completed a two-year pediatric residency at Boston's Children's Hospital Medical Center.

== Awards ==
Weaver has been awarded the Public Health Service Distinguished Service Medal, Meritorious Service Medal, and the Surgeon General's Exemplary Service Medal in recognition of his achievements.
