= Jesse Ehrenfeld =

American physician

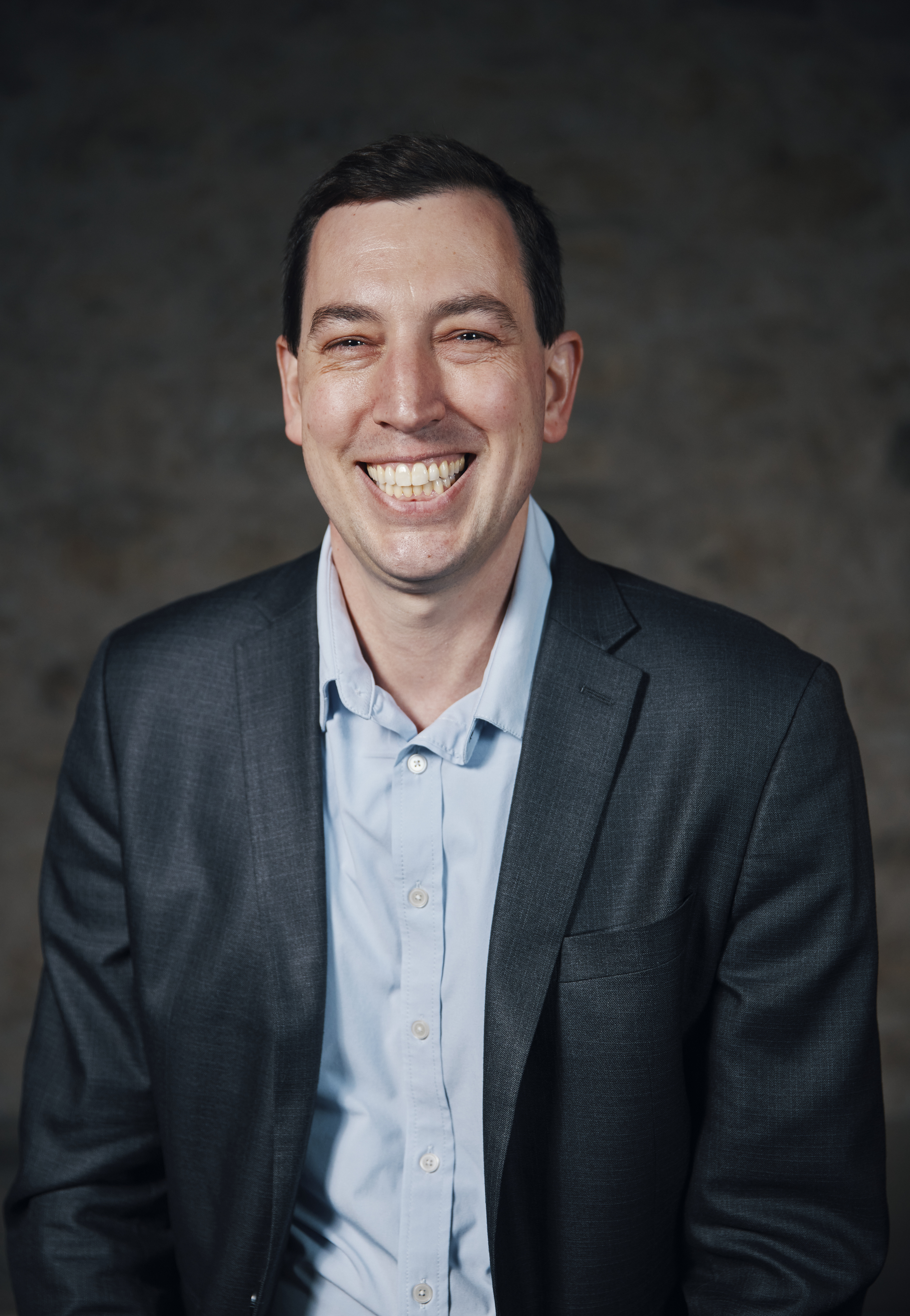
- Ehrenfeld at SXSW 2024
- Born: 1978 (age 47–48); Wilmington, Delaware, U.S.
- Education: Haverford College (BS); University of Chicago (MD); Harvard University (MPH)
- Scientific career
- Fields: Anesthesiology; Medical informatics

Jesse Menachem Ehrenfeld (born 1978) is an American physician. Ehrenfeld was president of the American Medical Association from 2023 to 2024, and Professor of Anesthesiology at the Medical College of Wisconsin. He is also a former Speaker of the Massachusetts Medical Society, where he was the youngest officer in the 228-year history of the organization. He is also a former Vice-President of the Massachusetts Society of Anesthesiologists.

The inaugural recipient on the NIH Sexual and Gender Minority Research Award from the NIH Director, Ehrenfeld has been recognized for his contributions to advancing health equity. A 2008 recipient of the AMA Foundation Leadership Award, Ehrenfeld is a researcher in the field of biomedical informatics. Ehrenfeld's research interests include bioinformatics and the application of information technology to increase quality, reliability and patient safety.

Ehrenfeld's work has led to the presentation of over 200 abstracts at national/international meetings and the publication of over 175 manuscripts in peer-reviewed journals. He serves as Editor-in-Chief of the Journal of Medical Systems, and is a fellow of the American Medical Informatics Association and the American Society of Anesthesiologists.

== Education ==
Born in Wilmington, Delaware, Ehrenfeld attended high school at Phillips Academy in Andover, Massachusetts. A board certified anesthesiologist, he holds a Bachelor of Science from Haverford College, an MD from the University of Chicago, and a Master of Public Health degree from Harvard University. He completed his Internship in Internal Medicine (2004–2005), Residency in Anesthesiology (2005–2008), and Informatics Fellowship (2008–2010) all at the Massachusetts General Hospital. He is Board Certified in both Anesthesiology and Clinical Informatics.

== Career ==
Ehrenfeld's research in the area of continuous quality improvement and intraoperative patient safety has been supported by the National Institutes of Health, the Department of Defense, the Robert Wood Johnson Foundation, the Foundation for Anesthesia Education and Research. and the American Medical Association. He was the founding director of the Anesthesia Fellowship in Biomedical Informatics at the Massachusetts General Hospital. He serves on the board of trustees of the American Medical Association. His appointments have included Assistant Professorships at Harvard Medical School and the Massachusetts General Hospital where he practiced anesthesiology within the Department of Anesthesia, Critical Care, and Pain Medicine. As of 2025, he is the director of the Advancing a Healthier Wisconsin Endowment (AHW), senior associate dean and professor of anesthesiology in the Medical College of Wisconsin (MCW) School of Medicine. Prior to that, he was professor of anesthesiology, surgery, biomedical informatics, and health policy at Vanderbilt University Medical Center. He is the author of several books, including "Pocket Anesthesia", "Anesthesia: A Case Based Survival Guide", and "The MGH Textbook of Anesthetic Equipment" and has published extensively in the medical literature. Ehrenfeld is active in the LGBTQ community, and is a Log Cabin Republican. He co-founded and directs the Vanderbilt Program for LGBTQ Health A commander in the U.S. Navy, Ehrenfeld serves as a medical reserve officer.

== Military service (2008–present) ==
On April 7, 2008, Ehrenfeld was commissioned as a lieutenant in the Naval Reserve. Initially assigned to Portsmouth Naval Medical Center, he served as a medical corps officer at an Operational Health Support Unit in Newport, Rhode Island. He was later assigned to Walter Reed National Military Medical Center, and served with an Operational Health Support Unit in Nashville, Tennessee. He completed Direct Commissioning Officer (DCO) School at the U.S. Naval Training Center in Newport, Rhode Island. In 2014, Ehrenfeld was called to active duty and served a tour in Kandahar, Afghanistan at the NATO Role III Multinational Medical Unit. During his tour, he served both as the anesthesiology division officer and the public affairs officer in support of both Operation Enduring Freedom and Resolute Support Mission from September 2014 to April 2015.

== Advocacy ==
A longtime advocate for patients, equality, and LGBTQ health, Ehrenfeld made international headlines on February 22, 2015, when he asked the newly appointed Secretary of Defense Ashton Carter his stance on letting transgender individuals serve in the military. The Secretary's response "I don't think anything but their suitability for service should preclude them [from serving]" — was his first public comment on the issue and the most favorable from a senior U.S. military official to date. Within hours, the event was being reported by news outlets all over the world and by the next afternoon the White House chimed in with its support, sparking even more media attention. This exchange was featured in the documentary TransMilitary.

In May 2015, Ehrenfeld and his partner were featured in a television ad supporting same-sex marriage. produced by Freedom to Marry. The television ad was banned from television when the NBC affiliate in Chattanooga, Tennessee refused to air the ad. On February 27, 2019, Ehrenfeld testified alongside five transgender service members in front of the House Armed Services Committee Subcommittee on Military Personnel. In his testimony, Ehrenfeld said "I would like to state unequivocally that there is no medically valid reason—including a diagnosis of gender dysphoria—to exclude transgender individuals from military service."

== Honors ==
- NIH Sexual and Gender Minority Research Award
- AMA Foundation Leadership Award
- Special Tribute and Commendation from the State of Delaware, House of Representatives
- Harvard Medical School Teaching Award
- Commendation for Excellence in Service from the United States Navy
- Nashville LGBT Chamber of Commerce Business Leader of the Year
- Joseph A. Johnson Jr. Distinguished Leadership Professor
- Levi Watkins Jr Faculty Award
- GLMA Achievement Award
- Tennessee Hospital Association Diversity Champion Award

== Personal life ==
Ehrenfeld is married to Judd H. Taback, an attorney. Ehrenfeld is the first openly gay president of the American Medical Association.
