= Stritch School of Medicine =

Medical school in Maywood, Illinois, US

Coordinates: 41°51′30.4″N 87°50′9.0″W

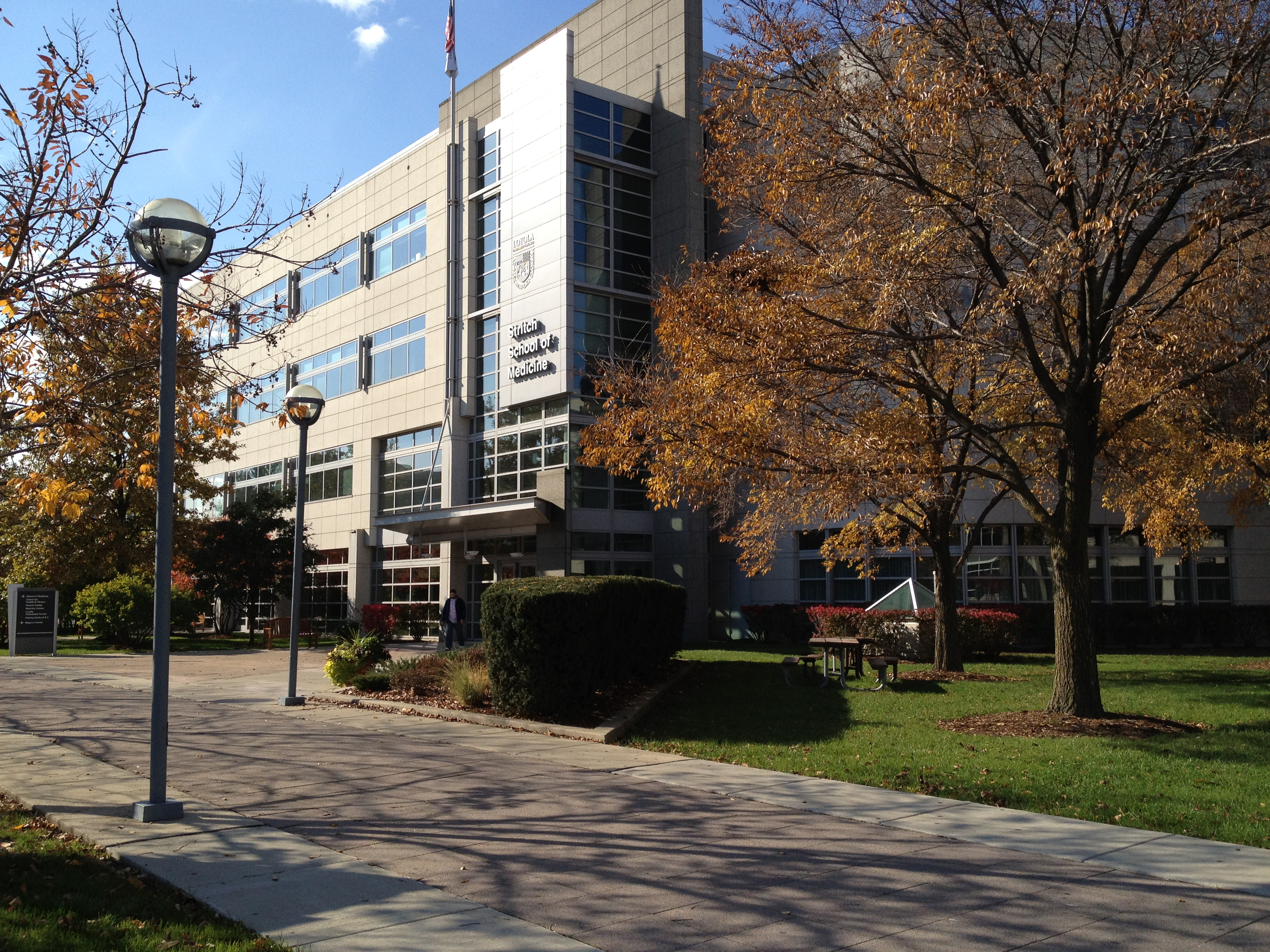
- Type: Private medical school
- Established: 1909
- Parent institution: Loyola University Chicago
- Religious affiliation: Catholic (Jesuit)
- Dean: Sam J. Marzo, MD
- Location: Maywood, Illinois, US
- Tuition (2009–2010): $39,200
- Website: stritch.luc.edu

The Stritch School of Medicine is the medical school affiliated with Loyola University Chicago. It is located at the heart of the Loyola University Medical Center in Maywood, Illinois. The medical campus includes Foster G. McGaw Hospital, Cardinal Bernardin Cancer Center, Center for Translational Research and Education, the Loyola Outpatient Center, the Loyola University Center for Health and Fitness along with other administrative buildings and departments that branch off from the hospital. While the Loyola University hospital, outpatient clinic and satellite sites serve as the main places of teaching, the Edward Hines Veterans Administration (VA) hospital is within walking distance and also serves as a teaching hospital for the Stritch School of Medicine.

Stritch grants Doctor of Medicine (M.D.) degrees to its graduates. Receiving a diploma requires successful completion of all coursework, plus passing Step 1 and Step 2 of the U.S. Medical Licensing Exam.

== History ==
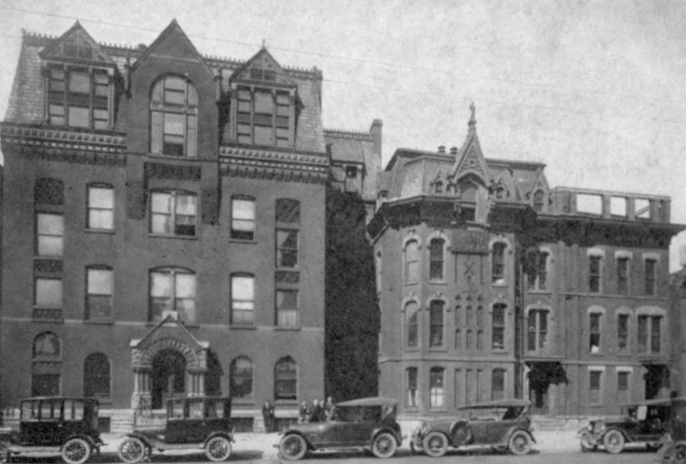
Building at 706 South Lincoln Street, Chicago in 1922

In 1909, around the same time that St. Ignatius College was rechartered as Loyola University, a new medical department was created, in affiliation with Illinois Medical School and Reliance Medical College. Its first regent, Rev. Henry S. Spalding, S.J. was approached in 1910 by Bennett Medical College about a merger, in the wake of the Flexner Report, which pressured many medical schools at the time to affiliate themselves with universities. The merger was approved by Rev. Alexander Burrowes, S.J., president of Loyola at the time; the conglomeration passed to complete control of the trustees in 1915 and became the Loyola University School of Medicine.

In order to secure accreditation with the American Medical Association (AMA), Loyola became one of the first medical schools to administer its own entrance exam to prospective students, thereby ensuring that the applicants were fully qualified. They also sought to offer more formal scientific training, while at the same time updating their physical facilities. By the end of Spalding's term as Regent in 1917, the standards of the school had been raised sufficiently to earn it an "A" rating from the AMA.

The Chicago College of Medicine and Surgery owned property and physical facilities ideally situated near the 2,700 bed Cook County hospital. This college with its laboratories and physical facilities was acquired in 1917 from Valparaiso University. Loyola University School of Medicine was accredited by the Council on Medical Education and Hospitals of the AMA on February 9, 1920, and has been a member of the Association of American Medical Colleges since 1921.

On April 15, 1948, the board of trustees of Loyola University of Chicago unanimously approved a resolution to designate this school as the Stritch School of Medicine in honor of the deceased Samuel Stritch, Cardinal Archbishop of Chicago.

In 1968, a new medical school and 504-bed teaching hospital – the first two units of the new Loyola University Medical Center – were completed on a 60-acre (240,000 m^{2}) tract of land in Maywood, Illinois. The new medical school was occupied in January 1969, and the university hospital opened its doors on May 21, 1969. In 1981, the Loyola University Mulcahy Outpatient Center, a comprehensive, multi-specialty clinic facility staffed by the faculty of the Stritch School of Medicine, was constructed to provide a full range of outpatient services.

In 1986, a Magnetic Resonance Imaging Unit was added to the Outpatient Center. The Vincent P. & Frances G. Russo Surgical Pavilion, containing a new 50 bed neonatal ICU, 16 operating rooms, 40 surgical intensive care beds, cardiac catheterization lab, pharmacy, cardiographics, and other support services, accepted its first patients in February 1987. The Emergency Medical Services Building opened in 1991, and the Cardinal Bernardin Cancer Center opened in 1994. The Stritch School of Medicine's state-of-the-art building, dedicated to a new curriculum founded on principles of active learning and early clinical experience, opened in July 1997.

== Academics ==
The first two years are done in blocks, with one class being the focus of each block. The first year includes Molecular Cell Biology and Genetics, anatomy, physiology and immunology as its four main blocks. Second year includes Neuroscience, Pharmacology, Mechanisms of Human Disease (Pathology, Microbiology) and Behavioral Science, with the three latter classes being woven through three blocks concurrently. Third year is a year of required clerkships including Medicine, Surgery, Psychiatry, Family Medicine, Pediatrics, Obstetrics/Gynecology, and Neurology. Fourth year students take two required subinternships, which are wards and intensive care, along with a required emergency medicine clerkship and many other elective clerkships.

The school emphasizes professionalism, also treating the human spirit, and a strong background in clinical skills. These aspects of the medical education are taught through lectures, small groups, mentoring and preceptor programs in a vertical curriculum of a class entitled "Patient-Centered Medicine". The aim is to provide first and second year medical students with not only the scientific knowledge to succeed in their clerkships and residencies, but also the clinical background to apply that knowledge.

== Notable alumni ==
- Bruce Lerman, cardiologist; Chief of the Division of Cardiology and Director of the Cardiac Electrophysiology Laboratory at Weill Cornell Medicine and the New York Presbyterian Hospital
- Charlie Pechous (1896–1980), Major League Baseball player and physician
- Rashid Rashid, dermatologist known for his work on hair transplantation
- Carl Glennis Roberts (1886–1950), American surgeon, civil rights activist
- Marjorie Wang, neurosurgeon
