= Shanti Das =

American businesswoman (born 1971)

- Born: February 19, 1971 (age 55); Atlanta, Georgia, United States
- Education: Benjamin Elijah Mays High School; Syracuse University (BA)
- Occupations: Record executive; marketing consultant; author
- Writing career
- Notable work: The Hip-Hop Professional: A Woman’s Guide to Climbing the Ladder of Success in the Entertainment Business

Shanti Das (born February 19, 1971) is an American record executive, speaker, author, and Philanthropist. She served as Vice President of Marketing at Columbia Records from 2001 to 2005, and Executive Vice President of Urban Marketing and Artist Development at Universal Motown Records from 2005 to 2009. During the latter role, she managed marketing campaigns for Akon, Erykah Badu, and Ashanti. She began her career at LaFace Records, where she was a promotions and marketing director from 1993 to 2000.

== Early life ==
Das's father, an immigrant from Kolkata, India, committed suicide when she was seven months old. She and her two siblings were raised by her mother, Gloria, an African American from Atlanta, Georgia.

== Career ==
In 2005, Das joined Universal Motown as Executive Vice President of Urban Marketing and Artist Development. From 2007 to 2009, she was co-president of 1st Class Entertainment and co-founder of R&B Live New York, a monthly live music series that showcased urban talent from signed and unsigned artists.

Das was named to Crain Communications "40 Under 40" in 2009. Later that year she created May We Rest in Peace, a nonprofit organization to help bury bodies stacking up at Detroit's Wayne County Morgue.

Das left Universal Motown in 2009 and launched the company PressReset.me, an Atlanta-based firm that provides entertainment marketing consulting, talent booking, special event planning and life mentoring services. She is currently co-founder of the live music showcase, ATL LIVE on the Park, a southern version of Das' New York R&B Live showcase.

In August 2010, Das wrote and published the book The Hip-Hop Professional: A Woman’s Guide to Climbing the Ladder of Success in the Entertainment Business, which chronicles her 20-year career in the music industry.

Das is an advisory board member of Bandier Music Program at Syracuse.
