= AMA Foundation Leadership Award =

The Excellence in Medicine Awards (frequently known as the Leadership Awards) are accolades presented annually by the American Medical Association Foundation to recognize excellence of a select group of physicians and medical students who exemplify the medical profession’s highest values: commitment to service, community involvement, altruism, leadership and dedication to patient care. The AMA Foundation Excellence in Medicine Awards are considered the "Oscars" within the medical community.

The awards are highly covered in the medical news world. They are also recognized widely in traditional media outlets. Past recipients have been from diverse institutions including Harvard, Johns Hopkins, Yale, University of Colorado, UCLA, Georgetown, University of Michigan, Michigan State University, and MD Anderson Cancer Center.

== Awards ==
- Dr. Debasish Mridha Spirit of Medicine Award: This award recognizes the work of a U.S. physician who demonstrates altruism, compassion, integrity, leadership skills and personal sacrifice while providing excellent health care to a destitute, distressed or marginalized population in an impoverished community.
- Dr. Edmond and Rima Cabbabe Dedication to the Profession Award: This award recognizes the work of a physician who demonstrates active and productive improvement to the medical profession. Fatima Cody Stanford was the 2021 recipient of this award.
- Pride in the Profession Award: The Pride in the Profession Awards honor caring for people. By practicing medicine in areas of challenge or crisis, or by devoting their time to volunteerism or public service, these physicians serve as the voice of patients in the United States who otherwise might not be heard. Regina Benjamin, US Surgeon General was bestowed with this award in 2009
- Dr. Nathan Davis International Award in Medicine: Named for the founder of the AMA, the Dr. Nathan Davis International Award in Medicine recognizes physicians who treat, educate, and counsel patients beyond the U. S. border.
- Leadership Awards: The Leadership Awards are presented to 10 medical students and 5 early career physicians selected from across the United States to recognize their outstanding leadership in the areas of advocacy, community service and/or education. Notable recipients include Rashid Rashid, Jesse Ehrenfeld, Fatima Cody Stanford, Andrew Miller and Anand Reddi.
- Jack B. McConnell, MD Award for Excellence in Volunteerism: The Jack B. McConnell, MD, Award for Excellence in Volunteerism recognizes the work of senior physicians who provide treatment to U. S. patients who lack access to health care. After a full career of practice, these physicians remain active volunteers.
- AMA Foundation Award for Leadership in Medical Ethics and Professionalism: This award is offered in a partnership between the AMA Foundation and the American Medical Association and it honors people dedicated to the principles of medical ethics and the highest standards of medical practice and who have made an outstanding contribution through active service in medical ethics activities.
