= Rashid Rashid =

American dermatologist

Rashid M. Rashid is an American dermatologist, known for his work on hair loss and transplantation.

He holds an M.D. and Ph.D. from Stritch School of Medicine (2007).

He is an AMA award recipient and FUE innovator, regularly featured in the media including the LA times, Wall Street Journal, NBC, and ABC for his work with Neograft and ARTAS system. His fellow AMA award winner was Dr. Andrew Miller.

== Advocacy ==
Initial proponent, and early advocate, for a simple rating system that grades public health-related news. This is similar to the public rating system used for music, movies, and video games allowing the general public easier guidance on what they are consuming.
