= Marjorie Wang =

Iranian-American neurosurgeon

Marjorie C. Wang
- Occupations: Neurosurgeon, researcher, and academic

Academic background
- Education: Brown University; Loyola University Chicago; University of Colorado Denver; University of Washington School of Public Health

Academic work
- Discipline: Neurosurgery
- Institutions: Medical College of Wisconsin

Marjorie Wang is an American neurosurgeon, researcher, and academic. She is a professor of Neurosurgery and Director of the Complex Spine Fellowship Program at the Medical College of Wisconsin.

== Early life and education ==
Wang received her undergraduate degree from Brown University, an MD from Loyola Stritch School of Medicine, and completed her residency at the University of Colorado Health Sciences Center in 2002. She then attended a complex spine fellowship at the Medical College of Wisconsin in 2006.

In 2011, Wang was selected by the Robert Wood Johnson Foundation to work as a clinical scholar at the University of Washington School of Public Health, where she received her MPH.

== Career ==
Wang's research focuses on spine, trauma, and health services. She studied outcomes after traumatic brain injury (TBI), utilization of repeat head CT after trauma, and risks associated with spine surgery. Her research on the spine includes degenerative myelopathy of the cervical spine and surgical interventions.

In 2017, Wang was named chair of the AANS/CNS Joint Section on Disorders of the Spine and Peripheral Nerves (DSPN). She is also Past Chair of the Joint Section on Disorders of the Spine and Peripheral Nerves Editorial Board of Journal of Neurosurgery, Spine Surgeons, serving in 2017–2018.

== Selected publications ==
- Wang, MC; Boop, FA; et al. (October 2020). "Continuous improvement in patient safety and quality in neurological surgery: the American Board of Neurological Surgery in the past, present, and future". J Neurosurg. 16 (2): 637–643. doi:10.3171/2020.6.JNS202066. PMID 33065539. S2CID 223554573.
- Wang, MC; AlGhamdi, MYT (February 2021). "Interspinous spacers for lumbar stenosis: time for obsolescence?". J Neurosurg Spine. 34 (4): 541–542. doi:10.3171/2020.8.SPINE201205. PMID 33530060. S2CID 231787589.
- Shabani, S; Meyer, BP; Budde, MD; Wang, MC (July 2021). "Diagnostic Imaging in Spinal Cord Injury". Neurosurg Clin N Am. 32 (3): 323–331. doi:10.1016/j.nec.2021.03.004. PMID 34053720. S2CID 235256465.
- Wang, Marjorie C. (2021-09-24). "Editorial. Return to work after spine surgery: do patients or physicians make the decision?". Journal of Neurosurgery. Spine. 36 (2): 165–167. doi:10.3171/2021.3.SPINE21270. ISSN 1547-5646. PMID 34560638. S2CID 237627168.
- Janich, KW; Wang, MC (2 September 2022). "Cervical laminoplasty for degenerative cervical myelopathy: still much more to learn". J Neurosurg Spine. 38 (1): 1–3. doi:10.3171/2022.5.SPINE22374. PMID 36057127. S2CID 252046378.
