= Regina Benjamin =

Surgeon General of the United States

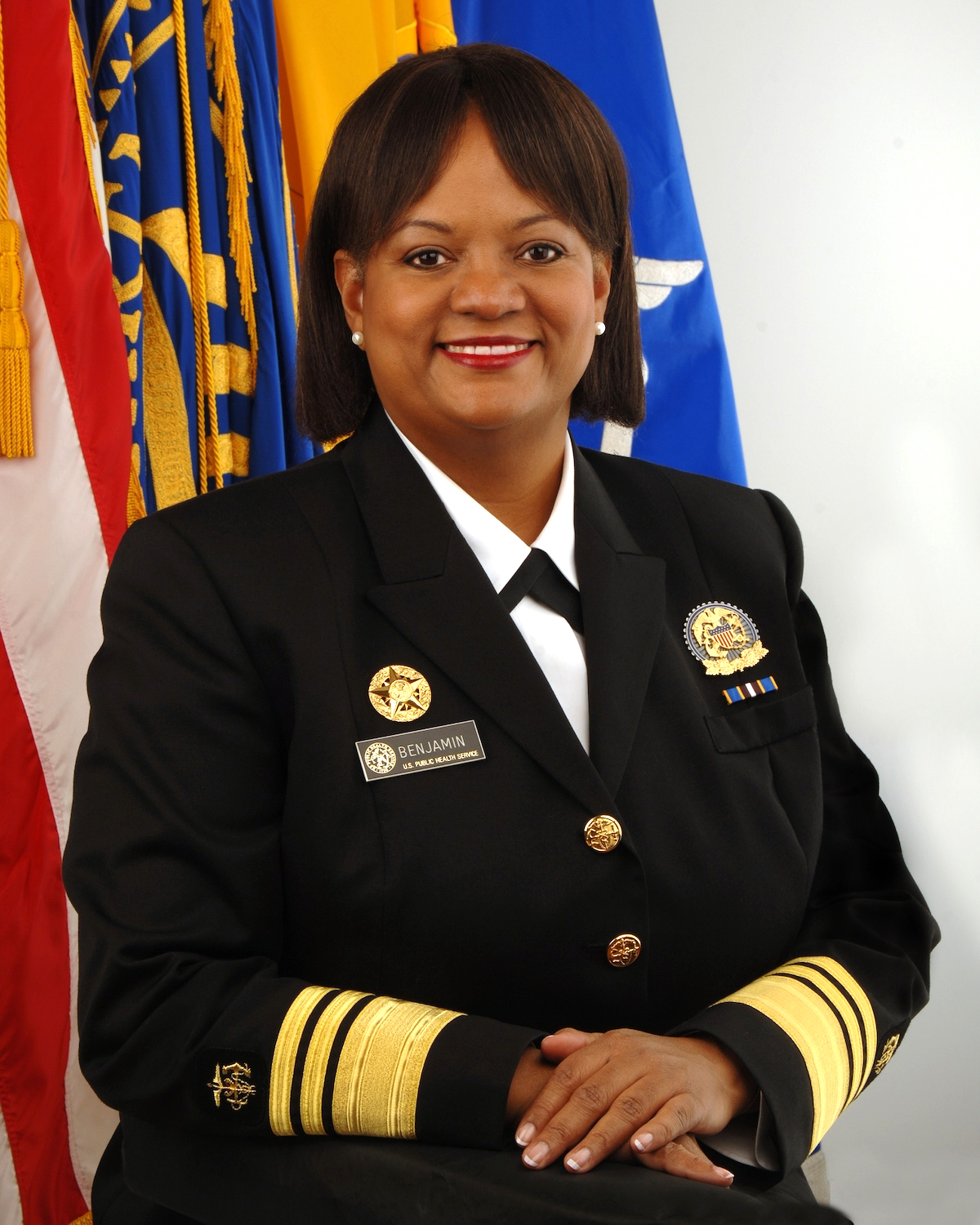
- Official portrait, 2009

18th Surgeon General of the United States
- In office November 3, 2009 – July 16, 2013
- President: Barack Obama
- Preceded by: Donald Weaver (acting)
- Succeeded by: Boris Lushniak (acting); Vivek Murthy (permanent)

Personal details
- Born: October 26, 1956 (age 69) Mobile, Alabama, U.S.
- Education: Xavier University, Louisiana (BS); Morehouse School of Medicine (attended); University of Alabama, Birmingham (MD); Tulane University (MBA)

Military service
- Service: U.S. Public Health Service
- Service years: 2009–2013
- Rank: Vice Admiral
- Unit: USPHS Commissioned Corps
- Awards: USPHS Regular Corps Ribbon

Regina Marcia Benjamin (born October 26, 1956) is an American physician and a former vice admiral in the U.S. Public Health Service Commissioned Corps who served as the 18th Surgeon General of the United States. Benjamin previously directed a nonprofit primary care medical clinic in Bayou La Batre, Alabama, and served on the board of trustees for the Morehouse School of Medicine.

== Early life and education ==
Benjamin was born in Mobile, Alabama on October 26, 1956. She graduated from Fairhope High School in Fairhope, Alabama, and then attended college at Xavier University of Louisiana in New Orleans, where she was initiated into the Gamma Alpha chapter of Delta Sigma Theta sorority. She is also a member of the second graduating class of Morehouse School of Medicine, then a two year program at Morehouse College. She received her M.D. degree from the University of Alabama at Birmingham and completed her residency in family medicine at the Medical Center of Central Georgia. About her experience as the first member of her family to attend medical school, she has stated "I had never seen a black doctor before I went to college." After entering solo medical practice in Bayou La Batre, Alabama, Benjamin worked for several years in emergency rooms and nursing homes to financially support its mission. After receiving an MBA from the Freeman School of Business at Tulane University, she converted her office to a rural health clinic.

== Career ==
Benjamin is a former associate dean for rural health at the College of Medicine at the University of South Alabama, where she administered the Alabama AHEC program and previously directed its Telemedicine Program. She served as the president of the Medical Association of the State of Alabama (MASA) in 2002, making her the first African-American woman president of a State Medical Society in the United States. In 1995, she was elected to the board of trustees of the American Medical Association, making her both the first physician under age 40 and the first African-American woman to be elected. She also served on the Board of Trustees of Florida A & M University, appointed by Florida Governor Jeb Bush. From 2008 to 2009, she served as Chair of the Board of Trustees of the Federation of State Medical Boards, a national non-profit organization representing the 70 medical and osteopathic boards of the United States and its territories.

Benjamin is a Diplomate of the American Board of Family Medicine and a Fellow of the American Academy of Family Physicians. She was a Kellogg National Fellow and also a Rockefeller Next Generation Leader. She has served on boards and committees. and Deep South Girl Scout Council.

She was appointed by the U.S. Department of Health and Human Services Secretary Donna Shalala to the Clinical Laboratory Improvement Act Committee and to the Council of Graduate Medical Education, and she is also a member of the "Step 3 Committee." In Alabama, she formerly served as vice president of the Governor's Commission on Aging, and also formerly as a member of the Governor's Health Care Reform Task Force and the Governor's Task Force on Children's Health.

She was a paid consultant for Burger King, contracted to provide nutritional advice on their offerings.

Benjamin's clinic was destroyed in 2005 by Hurricane Katrina and in 2006 by a fire on New Year's Day, one day before the scheduled reopening. She made headlines when she rebuilt the clinic a second time.

On March 10, 2016, it was announced that Benjamin will chair the National Kidney Foundation's CKDinsight summit. The goal of the meeting is to generate a clear, cohesive strategy that will create a roadmap for change that will elevate the national perception of kidney disease and create a culture where early detection is a priority.

In July 2016, Benjamin joined the Board of Directors of Darkness to Light, a national nonprofit advocate for child sexual abuse prevention. "This is not simply an issue for one family or community – it is a public health issue that affects society as a whole," Benjamin has said of the issue of child sexual abuse.

=== Bayou La Batre Rural Health Clinic ===
Benjamin is founder and CEO of the Bayou La Batre Rural Health Clinic in Bayou La Batre, Alabama, a small shrimping village along the Gulf Coast. Benjamin was the subject of a Reader's Digest article that chronicled her efforts to rebuild the clinic after Hurricane Katrina.

=== Surgeon General of the United States ===
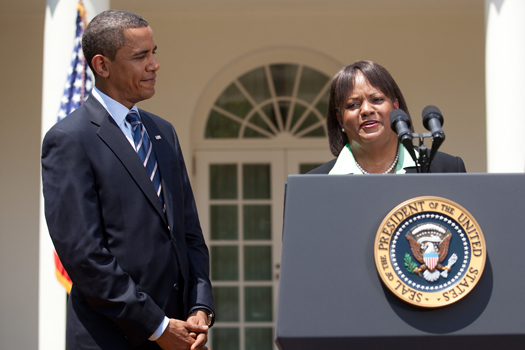
Benjamin accepting President Obama's nomination for U.S. Surgeon General in July 2009.

On July 13, 2009, President Barack Obama announced the choice of Benjamin for the position of Surgeon General of the United States and as a Medical Director in the regular corps of the Public Health Service. On October 7, 2009, Benjamin was unanimously approved by the United States Senate Committee on Health, Education, Labor, and Pensions. Benjamin was unanimously confirmed by the United States Senate on October 29, 2009.

Benjamin accepted the Obama's nomination, and made clear her dissatisfaction with the current health care system, in terms of accessibility as well as cost. Also in accepting her nomination, Benjamin described her own hardships faced by disease and illness in her own family. She noted the deaths of her brother, who died of HIV, as well as her father, who died of high blood pressure and diabetes, and her mother who died of lung cancer, all of which, she implied, were "preventable diseases."

In January 2010, Benjamin released her first document, entitled "The Surgeon General’s Vision for a Healthy and Fit Nation." In it, she highlighted the alarming trend of overweight and obese Americans, and offered a blueprint for grassroots efforts to make changes that promote the health and wellness of families and communities. Her work in this area has continued. One program encouraged women of color to exercise more and not skip the gym for fear of "messing up their hair" gave $5,000 to the winner of a healthy hair and fitness competition. This was detailed in an NPR interview. During the course of this interview several other programs were discussed, including the campaign against obesity, and the "Million Hearts" campaign to prevent one million heart attacks each year.

On January 20, 2011, Benjamin issued The Surgeon General's Call to Action to Support Breastfeeding, which was a science-based summary document intended to stimulate action on improving breastfeeding rates in the United States. There were 20 action items and 52 recommended implementation strategies.

In September, 2012, Benjamin issued "The 2012 National Strategy for Suicide Prevention, a report from the U.S. Surgeon General and the Action Alliance". This report discussed 13 goals and 60 objectives for reducing suicides over the next 10 years. In 2002, Surgeon General David Satcher launched the first National Strategy for Suicide Prevention.

Benjamin resigned from the position of U.S. Surgeon General on July 16, 2013.

==== Criticism ====
Her political support for abortion access had been cited as a source of controversy, since Benjamin is a Catholic and the Catholic Church opposes such access. However, she has also received an award from Pope Benedict XVI. Benjamin also sits on the board of the Catholic Health Association and is active in her local church. Benjamin served on the board of trustees of the Catholic Health Association. She was endorsed by Lloyd Dean, the president of Catholic Healthcare West, the largest hospital system in California, who issued a statement saying he was "delighted" by her nomination.

During her confirmation process, critics also sought to make Benjamin's personal weight a source of controversy.

The New York Times food columnist Mark Bittman said that Benjamin, "like most of her predecessors", avoided controversy, and avoided criticizing industry. The 2010 report, he said, blames "the victims" for eating too much and not getting enough exercise, while ignoring the marketing of junk food, and the scientific evidence for the contribution of sugar-sweetened food to obesity.

== Awards ==
In 1998, she was the United States recipient of the Nelson Mandela Award for Health and Human Rights.

Benjamin was named by TIME magazine as one of the "Nation's 50 Future Leaders Age 40 and Under." She was featured in a New York Times article, "Angel in a White Coat," and was chosen "Person of the Week" by ABC's World News Tonight with Peter Jennings, "Woman of the Year" by CBS This Morning, and "Woman of the Year" by People Magazine. She was also featured on the December 1999 cover of Clarity Magazine and received the 2000 National Caring Award, which was inspired by Mother Teresa.

In 2006, she was awarded the papal cross Pro Ecclesia et Pontifice by Pope Benedict XVI.

In 2008, Benjamin was named one of America's Best Leaders by U.S. News & World Report. In September 2008, she was one of that year's class of 25 in the MacArthur Fellows Program, nicknamed the "Genius Awards," receiving a grant from the John D. and Catherine T. MacArthur Foundation that would have been worth $500,000 over the course of five years. However, as a federal employee, she had to stop accepting the MacArthur Fellows stipend when she accepted the position as Surgeon General.

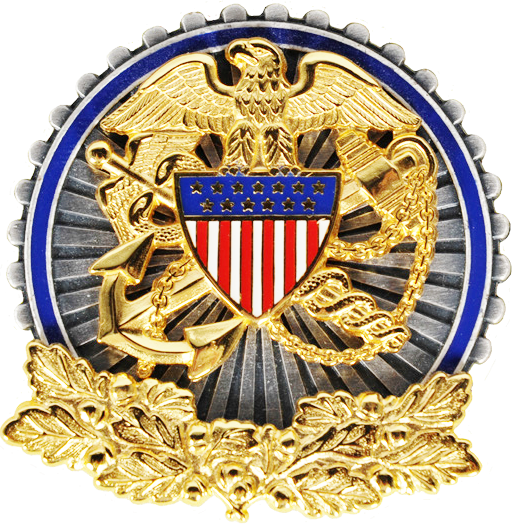
Badge of the Office of the Secretary of Health and Human Services
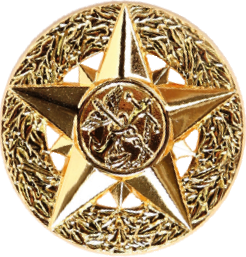
Surgeon General of the United States Badge
Public Health Service Regular Corps Ribbon
Pro Ecclesia et Pontifice Award

In 2009, she received the American Medical Association Foundation Leadership Award.

In 2010, she was awarded an honorary degree of Doctor of Science from Dartmouth College at its Commencement ceremony.

On May 8, 2010, she was awarded an honorary degree of Doctorate of Pharmacy from the Albany College of Pharmacy and Health Sciences at the college's 130th Commencement ceremony held at the Empire State Plaza in Albany, New York.

On Saturday, May 15, 2010, Benjamin received an honorary degree of Doctor of Science at Tulane University Commencement.

On October 7, 2010, she received the Trumpeter Award from the National Consumers League recognizing her years of service to improving the nation's health.

On May 28, 2011, she received an honorary degree of Doctorate of Humane Letters from Rensselaer Polytechnic Institute, after which she delivered the address for the school's 205th commencement.

On May 18, 2012, she received an honorary degree of Doctorate of Science from the University of Rochester Medical Center's School of Medicine and Dentistry. She also delivered the commencement address.

On May 9, 2014, she received The Nichols-Chancellor's Medal from Vanderbilt University and spoke at the University's Senior Day event.

On May 14, 2016, she received an honorary degree from Elizabethtown College.

Military offices
Preceded by Donald Weaver; Acting	Surgeon General of the United States; 2009–2013	Succeeded by Boris Lushniak; Acting
