= Natrez Patrick =

American football player (born 1997)

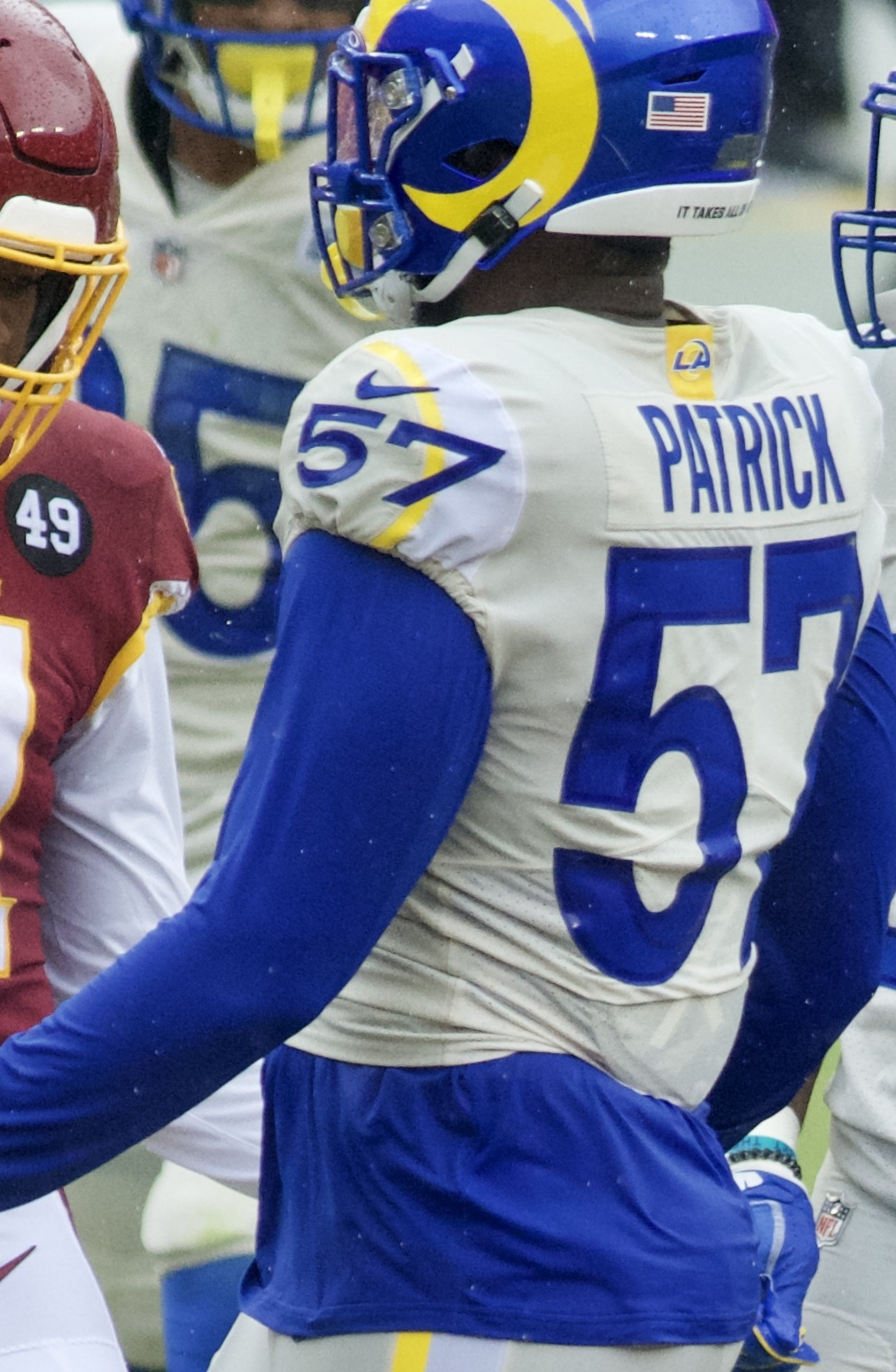
- Patrick with the Los Angeles Rams in 2020

Profile
- Position: Linebacker

Personal information
- Born: July 9, 1997 (age 29); Atlanta, Georgia, U.S.
- Listed height: 6 ft 3 in (1.91 m)
- Listed weight: 242 lb (110 kg)

Career information
- High school: Mays (Atlanta, Georgia)
- College: Georgia
- NFL draft: 2019: undrafted

Career history
- Los Angeles Rams (2019–2020); Denver Broncos (2021); Detroit Lions (2022)*; Montreal Alouettes (2023)*
- * Offseason or practice squad member only

Career NFL statistics
- Total tackles: 5
- Stats at Pro Football Reference

Natrez Deshun Patrick (born July 9, 1997) is an American professional football linebacker. He played college football for four seasons for the University of Georgia Bulldogs.

== Early life ==
Patrick was born in Atlanta, Georgia. At Benjamin Elijah Mays High School, Patrick was named USA Today All-USA second-team after recording 111 total tackles (27 for loss) during his senior season. He was named to the Atlanta Journal-Constitution's 2014 All-State Class AAAAA defense and named its 2014 Defensive Player of the Year, as well as the Georgia Sports Writers Association 2014 All-State Class AAAAA first-team and 2014 Defensive Player of the Year. He was named a four-star prospect by Rivals.com, ESPN, Scout.com, and played in the 2015 U.S. Army All American Bowl.

== College career ==
Patrick was a four-year starter at University of Georgia. Coaches and teammates also recognised his leadership qualities.

He enrolled at UGA on January 1, 2015, after receiving offers from two dozen other Power 5 programs.

Patrick was named a preseason All-SEC honoree by Athlon Sports prior to the 2018 season even after a four-game suspension limited his playing time his junior year.

=== College statistics ===
Year	GP	SOLO	AST	TOT	TFL-YDS	SACKS-YDS	INT	PD	FF	FR	BLK
2015	11	12	10	22	2.5-10	1-6	0	0	0	0	0
2016	10	29	30	59	4.5-15	1-9	0	0	0	0	0
2017	9	13	22	35	2.5-5	0-0	0	0	0	0	0
2018	14	25	19	44	4.5-7	0-0	0	1	0	0	0
Total	44	79	81	160	14.0-37	2.0-15	0	1	0	0	0

== Professional career ==
Pre-draft measurables
Height	Weight	Arm length	Hand span	40-yard dash	10-yard split	20-yard split	20-yard shuttle	Three-cone drill	Vertical jump	Broad jump	Bench press
6 ft 2 1/2 in (1.89 m)	244 lb (111 kg)	33 1/8 in (0.84 m)	10 1/4 in (0.26 m)	4.97 s	1.74 s	2.85 s	4.56 s	7.19 s	31.0 in (0.79 m)	9 ft 10 in (3.00 m)	15 reps
All values from Pro Day

=== Los Angeles Rams ===
After going undrafted in the 2019 NFL draft, Patrick was signed as a free agent by the Los Angeles Rams on April 29, 2019.

On September 5, 2020, Patrick was waived by the Rams and signed to the practice squad the next day. He was elevated to the active roster on September 19 for the team's week 2 game against the Philadelphia Eagles, and reverted to the practice squad after the game. He was promoted to the active roster on September 24, 2020. He was waived on November 10, 2020, and re-signed to the practice squad the next day. He was signed to the active roster on November 28, 2020. On January 7, 2021, Patrick was waived by the Rams.

=== Denver Broncos ===
On January 8, 2021, Patrick was claimed off waivers by the Denver Broncos, but the claim was deferred until after the Super Bowl on February 8. He was waived/injured on June 17, 2021, and placed on injured reserve.

=== Detroit Lions ===
On May 16, 2022, Patrick signed with the Detroit Lions. He was waived on July 28, 2022.

=== Montreal Alouettes ===
Patrick was signed by the Montreal Alouettes of the Canadian Football League (CFL) on January 17, 2023. He was listed as a defensive end by the Alouettes. On June 3, 2023, Patrick was released.

== Personal life ==
Patrick was arrested three times for misdemeanor marijuana possession, resulting in two suspensions. The last one landed him in a treatment facility that caused him to miss UGA's 2018 Rose Bowl and the National Championship Game, despite a "penny-sized" amount of the drug being found in a teammate's car and being claimed by the vehicle's owner. Charges were subsequently dropped.
