= Benjamin Elijah Mays High School =

Public high school in Atlanta, Georgia, United States

Coordinates: 33.73544°N 84.50357°W

Mays High School

Location
- 3450 Benjamin E Mays Dr SW; Atlanta, Georgia 30331; United States

Information
- Type: Public
- Motto: "A legacy to keep, an image to uphold..."
- Established: 1981
- School district: Atlanta Public Schools
- Principal: Ramon Garner
- Teaching staff: 112.00 (FTE)
- Grades: 9–12
- Enrollment: 1,363 (2023–24)
  - Grade 9: 405
  - Grade 10: 377
  - Grade 11: 329
  - Grade 12: 252
- Student to teacher ratio: 12.17
- Campus: Urban
- Colors: Columbia blue and maize gold
- Mascot: Raiders
- Website: https://mays.atlantapublicschools.us/

Benjamin E. Mays High School is a public school located in southwest Atlanta, Georgia, United States, serving grades 9–12. It is a part of the Atlanta Public School System and is a Georgia School of Excellence. The school was established in the fall of 1981 and was named after Benjamin Elijah Mays, an educator, author and civil rights activist.

The school's athletic nickname is the Raiders.

== History ==
=== Southwest High School (1950–1981) ===
The Atlanta Public Schools formed Southwest High School in 1950. The school was a landmark in the city of Atlanta for 36 years. In 1981, Benjamin E. Mays High School was formed, replacing Southwest High School.

==== Southwest High School athletics ====
State Championships

- 1973 GHSA State AA Football Champions
- 1973 GHSA Boys' State AA Basketball Champions
- 1974 GHSA Boys' State AA Basketball Champions
- 1979 GHSA Boys' State AAA Basketball Champions

=== Mays High School (1981–present) ===
The high school completed $32 million worth of renovations in January 2012.

On February 14, 2024, four students were shot and wounded in a drive-by shooting in the school's student parking lot. A 14-year-old student was arrested and charged for the shooting.

==== Mays High School athletics ====
The Mays High School Raiders athletic teams compete in Region 4-AAAA of the Georgia High School Association.

Mays High offers a wide variety of athletic programs, including varsity girls' softball, varsity boys' track, varsity boys' soccer, varsity football, junior varsity football, freshman football, varsity boys' basketball, junior varsity boys' basketball, varsity girls' basketball, junior varsity girls' basketball, varsity basketball, junior varsity basketball, cheerleading, co-ed step team, varsity boys' swimming, varsity girls' volleyball, and varsity girls' swimming. All home varsity football games, as well as track events, are held at Lakewood Stadium.

State/Region Championships

- 2001 GHSA AAAA Boys' Track Champions
- 2003 GHSA AAAA Girls' Basketball Champions
- 2004 GHSA AAAA Boys' Basketball Champions
- 2005 GHSA AAAA Boys' Basketball Champions
- 2014 GHSA State AAAAA Football Runner-Up
- 2015 GHSA Region 6-AAAAA Football Runner-Up Champions
- 2016 GHSA Region 5-AAAAAA Football Champions
- 2017 GHSA Region 5-AAAAAA Football Champions
- 2017 GHSA State AAAAAA Girls' Basketball Champions
- 2017 GHSA State AAAAAA Girls' Track and Field Champions
- 2019 GHSA Region 5-AAAAAA Football Champions
- 2021 GHSA Region 6-AAAA Football Runner-Up Champions

== Notable alumni ==
- Tyrell Adams, NFL player
- Kelly Campbell, former football player for Georgia Tech and several NFL and CFL teams
- Xzavion Curry, Major League Baseball pitcher
- Shanti Das, music industry executive, marketing consultant, entrepreneur, philanthropist, and author
- Andre Dickens, 61st Mayor of Atlanta
- De'Mon Glanton, football player
- Antonio Grier, NFL linebacker for the Tampa Bay Buccaneers
- Kwanza Hall, former Congressman
- Charles Lee Isbell Jr., dean of the Georgia Institute of Technology College of Computing
- Termarr Johnson, 2022 MLB 4th overall draft pick
- Tayari Jones, author
- Walter Kimbrough, president of Dillard University
- Mesha Mainor, State Representative in the Georgia House of Representatives
- Bryan McClendon, football coach and former player for Georgia
- Ceasar Mitchell, former president of the Atlanta City Council
- Adrienne C. Moore, actress
- Natrez Patrick, NFL player
- Diallo Riddle, writer, producer, and actor
- Fatima Cody Stanford, an associate professor at Harvard University and an obesity physician-scientist at Massachusetts General Hospital
- Rozonda Thomas, musician
- Reggie Wilkes, former Georgia Tech and NFL football player
- DeAngelo Yancey, football player
- D.C. Young Fly, comedian
