= De'Mon Glanton =

American football player (born 1986)

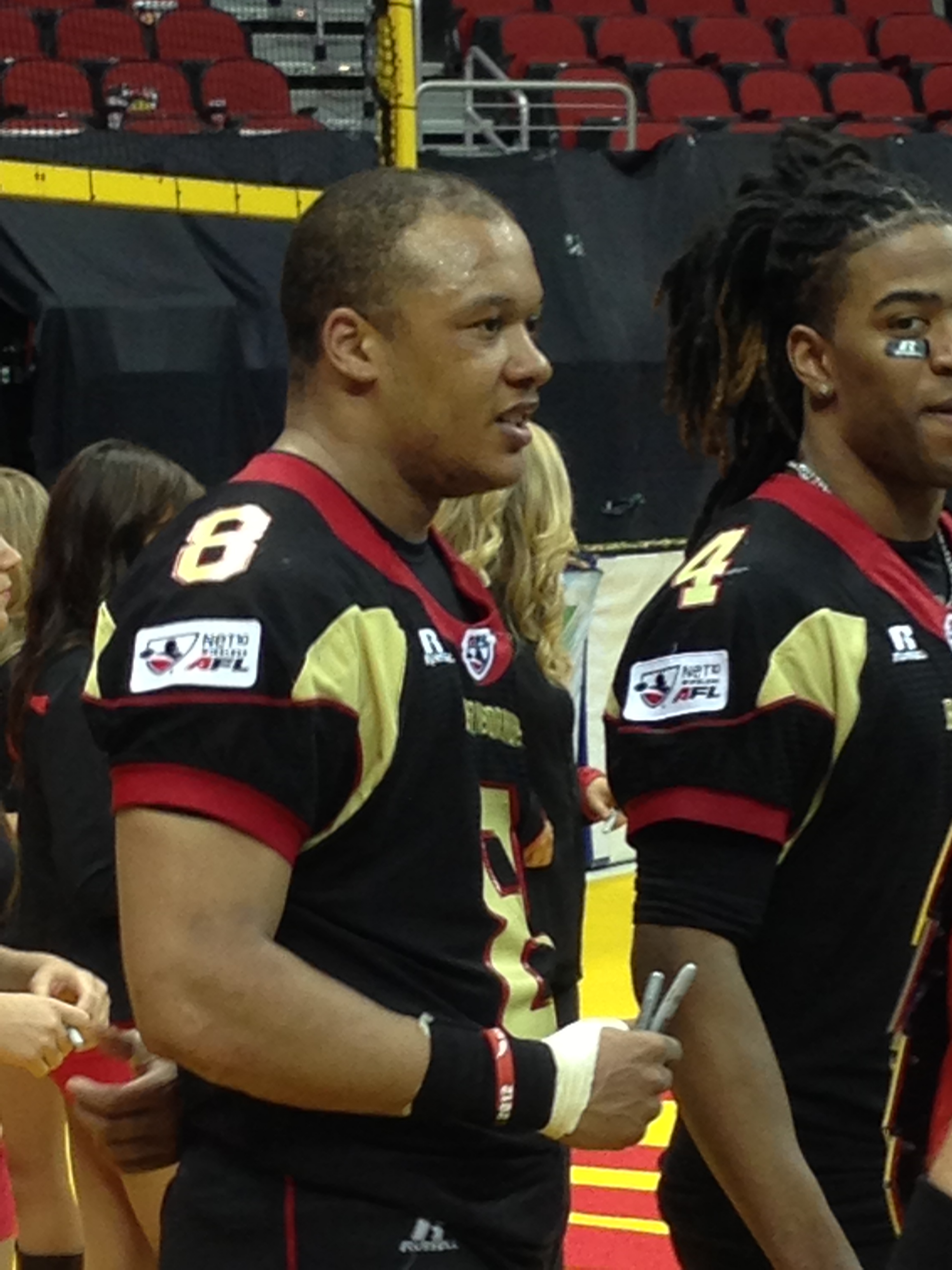
- Glanton with the Iowa Barnstormers in 2013

No. 8, 16
- Position: Defensive back

Personal information
- Born: July 22, 1986 (age 40); Atlanta, Georgia, U.S.
- Listed height: 6 ft 1 in (1.85 m)
- Listed weight: 200 lb (91 kg)

Career information
- High school: Mays (Atlanta)
- College: Mississippi State
- NFL draft: 2009: undrafted

Career history
- Henry Horsemen (2011); Iowa Barnstormers (2012–2014); Los Angeles Kiss (2015); Portland Thunder (2015); Orlando Predators (2016)*
- * Offseason or practice squad member only

Career AFL statistics
- Tackles: 285
- Pass deflections: 31
- Forced fumbles: 4
- Interceptions: 14
- Stats at ArenaFan.com

De'Mon Glanton (born July 22, 1986) is an American former professional football defensive back who played in the Arena Football League (AFL) for the Iowa Barnstormers, Los Angeles Kiss, and Portland Thunder. He played college football at Mississippi State University.

== Early life ==
Glanton played high school football at Benjamin Elijah Mays High School in Atlanta, Georgia. He compiled over 600 receiving yards as a wide receiver and six interceptions on defense. He earned honorable mention all-state honors in 2003. He also helped the Raiders to an 11–1 overall record and into the second round of the state playoffs as regional champions.

== College career ==
Glanton played for the Mississippi State Bulldogs from 2005 to 2008. He was redshirted in 2004. He appeared in all 48 games for the Bulldogs, starting 28 while recording career totals of 134 tackles and five interceptions.

== Professional career ==
Glanton was rated the 32nd best strong safety in the 2009 NFL draft by NFLDraftScout.com. He played for the Henry Horsemen of the Gridiron Developmental Football League in 2011.

Glanton was assigned to the Iowa Barnstormers of the Arena Football League (AFL) on October 21, 2011. He compiled 38 tackles in eleven games his rookie year in 2012. He recorded 95 tackles and six interceptions in 17 games in 2013 and was named the Barnstormers' Defensive Player of the Year. Glanton accumulated 86 tackles and four interceptions in 16 games during the 2014 season. The Barnstormers left the AFL and became members of the Indoor Football League on August 27, 2014.

Glanton was assigned to the AFL's Los Angeles Kiss on September 29, 2014. He was placed on recallable reassignment by the Kiss on April 7, 2015.

Glanton was assigned to Portland Thunder of the AFL on May 11, 2015. He became a free agent after the 2015 season.

On January 6, 2016, Glanton was assigned to the Orlando Predators of the AFL. On March 25, 2016, Glanton was placed on recallable reassignment.
