= Quantic School of Business and Technology =

Business school in Washington, D.C, USA

- Other name: Quantic Business School
- Motto: Business school of the future
- Type: Private online business school
- Established: 2016; 10 years ago
- Founders: Tom Adams, Alexie Harper, Ori Ratner
- Parent institution: Pedago
- Accreditation: DEAC
- Chairman: Tom Adams
- President: Bill Fisher
- Total staff: 130
- Students: 15,000
- Location: Washington, D.C., U.S.
- Campus: Online
- Language: English
- Website: quantic.edu

The Quantic School of Business and Technology is an online private business school based in Washington, D.C. Founded as Smartly Institute by Tom Adams in 2016, the school offers accredited executive degree programs through its proprietary mobile-first learning platform and is known for its unique pedagogy that uses gamified active learning methods.

The school is owned by its parent company Pedago. It currently offers five accredited degree programs, the Master of Business Administration (MBA), the Executive MBA (EMBA), a Master of Science in Business Analytics, a Master of Science in Software Engineering, and the Master of Science in AI Engineering (MSAIE). The school does not require standardized exams such as GRE or GMAT for admissions.

== Active learning ==
Quantic uses an "interactive mobile app" developed by its parent company Pedago. It uses "active learning" methodologies through interactive and gamified learning modules as alternative to video lectures. Successive modules are unlocked after completing tasks such as quizzes from its prerequisite courses. Students are graded numerically and require a passing rate of at least 80% to complete a course. It also has machine-based tutoring that helps provide individualized feedback to students.

== Accreditation ==
Quantic received institutional accreditation from the Distance Education Accrediting Commission (DEAC) in 2020. Quantic School of Business and Technology and its Valar Institute Division are licensed by the District of Columbia Higher Education Licensure Commission in Washington, DC and accredited by the DEAC. The DEAC is listed by the United States Department of Education as a recognized accrediting agency and is also recognized by the Council for Higher Education Accreditation (CHEA).
