= Termarr Johnson =

American baseball player (born 2004)

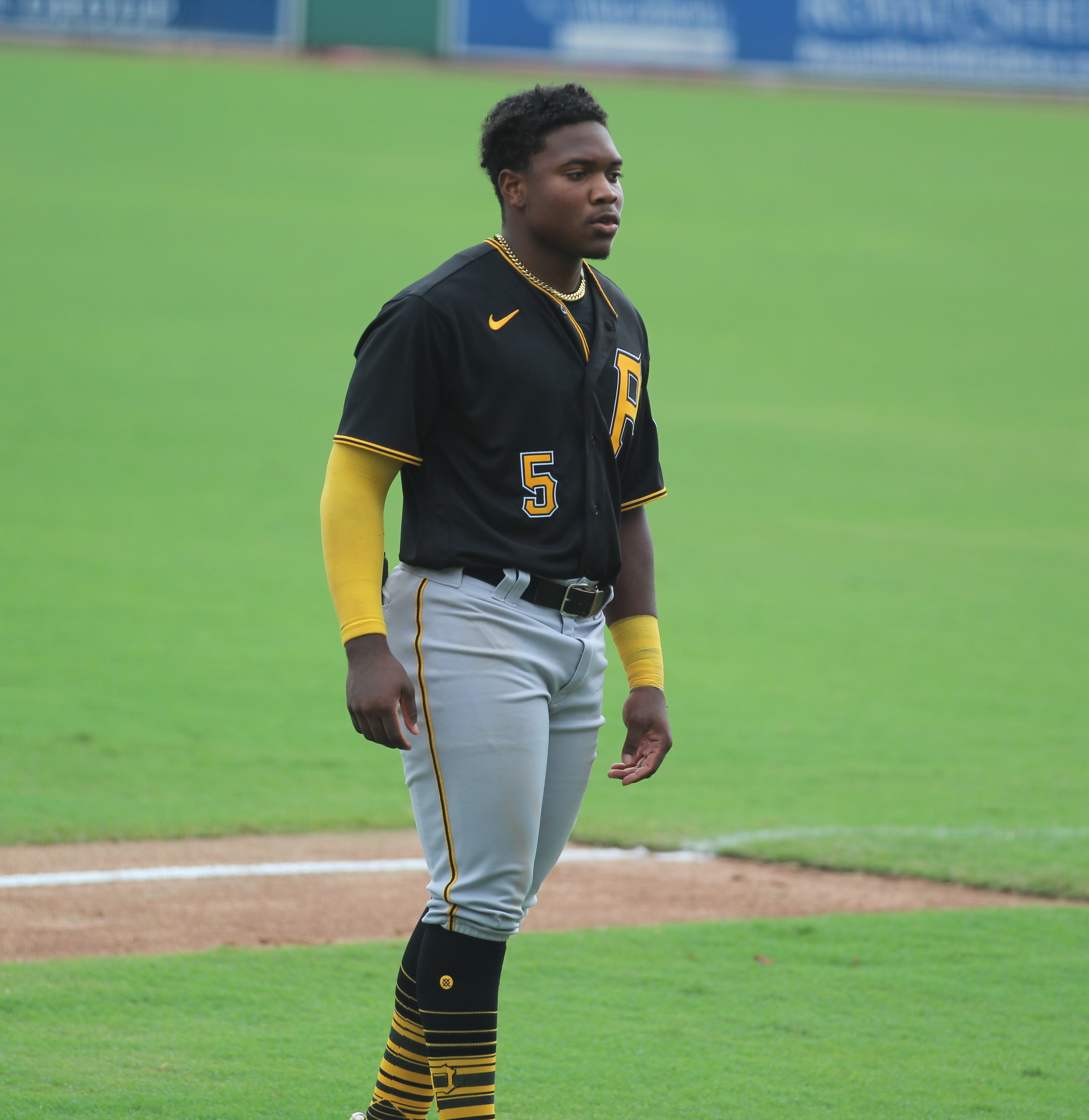
- Johnson with the Florida Complex League Pirates in 2022

Pittsburgh Pirates
- Second baseman / Shortstop
- Born: June 11, 2004 (age 22); Atlanta, Georgia, U.S.
- Bats: Left Throws: Right
- Stats at Baseball Reference
Medals
Men's baseball
Representing United States
WBSC Premier12
Bronze medal – third place	2024 Tokyo	Team

Termarr Johnson (born June 11, 2004) is an American professional baseball second baseman and shortstop in the Pittsburgh Pirates organization.

== Amateur career ==
Johnson was born in Atlanta, Georgia to Terry and Kim Johnson. He attended Benjamin Elijah Mays High School. During the summer of 2021, Johnson participated in the Breakthrough Series. He also played in the High School All-American Game as well as participating in the All-Star High School Home Run Derby at Coors Field in which he finished in third place with 24 home runs. That same summer, he participated in the Perfect Game All-American Classic Home Run Derby which he won.

Johnson entered his senior season in 2022 as a top-five prospect for the upcoming draft. During his senior year, he committed to play college baseball at Arizona State University. Following the season's end, he traveled to San Diego where he participated in the Draft Combine.

Prior to the draft Johnson appeared on the cover of Baseball America with fellow Atlanta native, and top draft prospect, Druw Jones.

== Professional career ==
The Pittsburgh Pirates selected Johnson in the first round, with the fourth overall selection, of the 2022 Major League Baseball draft. Johnson signed with the Pirates and received a $7,219,000 signing bonus.

Johnson made his professional debut with the Rookie-level Florida Complex League Pirates. After nine games, he was promoted to the Bradenton Marauders of the Single-A Florida State League. Over 23 games between the two teams, he batted .222 with one home run, six RBI, and six stolen bases. Johnson returned to Bradenton to open the 2023 season. In early August, he was promoted to the Greensboro Grasshoppers of the High-A South Atlantic League. Over 105 games played, Johnson compiled a slash line of .244/.422/.438 with 18 home runs, 59 RBI, 12 doubles, and ten stolen bases. He was assigned back to Greensboro to open the 2024 season. In late August, Johnson was promoted to the Altoona Curve of the Double-A Eastern League. Across 124 appearances split between the two affiliates, Johnson batted .237 with 15 home runs, 54 RBI, and 22 stolen bases.

Johnson was assigned back to Altoona for the entirety of the 2025 season. He played in 119 games and hit .272 with nine home runs, 35 RBI, and 20 stolen bases. Johnson opened the 2026 season with the Indianapolis Indians of the Triple-A International League. In mid-August, he was placed on the injured list with a torn ACL and LCL, ending his season prematurely. Johnson played in 96 games for the Indians prior to his injury and hit .199 with eight home runs, 37 RBI, and 24 stolen bases.

== International career ==
In 2019, Johnson was named to the 2019 USA Baseball 15U National Team for the WBSC U-15 World Cup Americas Qualifier and won a gold medal. In 2021, he played for the USA Baseball 18U National Team in a friendly series against Canada. Johnson was named to the United States national baseball team for the 2024 WBSC Premier12.

== Personal life ==
Johnson is the youngest of four brothers. His oldest brother, Tervont, is an assistant coach for the Georgetown Hoyas baseball team. Another brother, Tervell, plays baseball and is an outfielder for the University of Texas Rio Grande Valley.
