= Henry S. Spalding =

American Catholic priest and author (1865–1934)

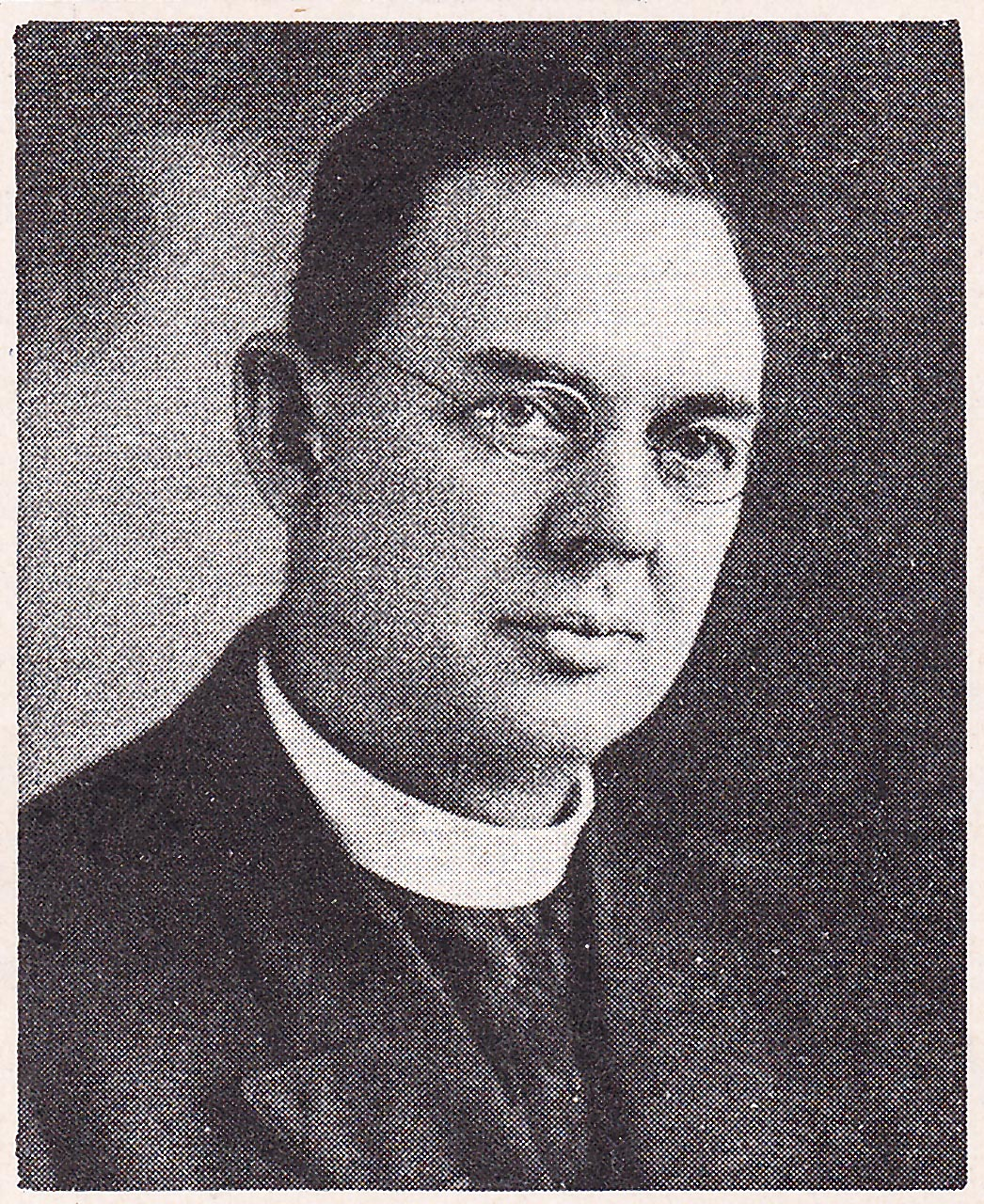
Henry S. Spalding, S.J.

Henry Stanislaus Spalding, S.J. (1865–1934) was the author of several books about medical ethics but was best known for his series of adventure books for boys. His stories incorporated elements of the Catholic faith as well as history and outdoor adventure.

== Early life ==
Henry Stanislaus Spalding was born on January 10, 1865, in Bardstown, Kentucky. The Spalding family was staunchly Catholic, having been among the early English settlers of the colony of Maryland, and with other families had settled in the Bardstown/Rolling Fork area, which later grew into the first Catholic diocese west of the Appalachians.

Among the descendants of these original Spalding settlers were the Most Reverend Martin John Spalding, archbishop of Baltimore from 1864 to 1872, and John Lancaster Spalding, who was bishop of Peoria from 1877 to 1908. Though not as illustrious as these two, among Henry's siblings were a Dominican priest and four Dominican nuns.

== Jesuit priest and educator ==
Spalding entered the Jesuit novitiate at Florissant, Missouri, on August 7, 1884, and spent five years teaching at Marquette College (now Marquette University) from 1888 to 1893 before completing his studies for the priesthood at St. Louis University and Woodstock College. Here he was ordained in 1899 by Cardinal James Gibbons. He later returned to Marquette, where he held the post of Prefect of Studies and Discipline from 1903 to 1908. During this time, with then-president of Marquette, Alexander Burrowes, he helped establish the Schools of Medicine, Dentistry and Pharmacy (now the Medical College of Wisconsin), of which he subsequently was appointed regent.

In 1911 Spalding worked with Burrowes once more to establish the Loyola University School of Medicine (now the Stritch School of Medicine), where he remained Regent until 1917. Both here and at Marquette, the establishment of these medical schools involved mergers with secular schools, and coming under the authority of these Catholic institutions meant that certain subjects that contradicted Catholic teaching had to be avoided. Perhaps as a result of this, Spalding began teaching medical ethics at this time, produced several textbooks on the subject, and would later develop a specialty in Sociology, crowning his career with a textbook on the subject, in collaboration with fellow Jesuit Herbert Muntsch.

== Catholic author ==
Spalding began publishing stories for boys in 1901, beginning with The Cave of the Beech Fork and following it in 1903 with The Sheriff of the Beech Fork. Both stories are set in 1815 in Spalding's hometown of Bardstown, Kentucky, and mention actual figures such as William Byrne and Bishop Benedict Joseph Flaget, both of whom figured heavily in the life of his relative, Archbishop Martin John Spalding. The historical setting and the outdoors adventures in these books prompted Maurice Francis Egan to say of them, "In The Cave by the Beech Fork a new genre is credited in American Catholic Literature...all the fresh air books provided for boys had hitherto been written by non-Catholics..."

Spalding's special study of Jacques Marquette formed the basis for his next historical novels, The Race for Copper Island and The Marks of the Bear Claws, and his appointment as Knights of Columbus chaplain to Camp Johnson in Jacksonville, Florida, during World War I gave him the impetus to write two books set in the Everglades, Held in the Everglades and Signals from the Bay Tree. And having descended from early Maryland settlers, he prepared for the Maryland Tercentenary in 1934 by writing Catholic Colonial Maryland as well as the historical novel Arrows of Iron.

== Illness and death ==
In 1932 Spalding was diagnosed with pernicious anemia and was not expected to live, but he recovered and was able to celebrate his Golden Jubilee on August 12, 1934. Early that fall, however, the anemia returned, and as he worsened, he was given last rites and was visited by several of his siblings one last time before slipping into a coma and dying on December 27, 1934.

== Works ==
- The Cave by the Beech Fork (1901)
- The Sheriff of the Beech Fork (1903)
- The Race for Copper Island (1905)
- The Marks of the Bear Claws (1908)
- The Old Mill on the Withrose (1910)
- Finding the Great River: the Story of Father Marquette (1911)
- The Sugar Camp and After (1912)
- The Camp by Copper River (1915)
- At the Foot of the Sand Hills (1917)
- Held in the Everglades (1919)
- Talks to nurses: the ethics of nursing (1920)
- Moral principles and medical practice: the basis of medical jurisprudence by Charles Coppens, Revised and expanded by Henry S. Spalding (1921)
- Signals from the Bay Tree (1921)
- In the Wilds of the Canyon (1923)
- A brief text-book of moral philosophy by Charles Coppens, Revised and expanded by Henry S. Spalding (1924)
- Letters on Marriage (1924)
- Chapters in Social History (1925)
- Social Problems and Agencies (1925)
- Stranded on Long Bar (1925)
- The Indian Gold-Seeker (1927)
- Introductory sociology, by Albert Muntsch and Henry S. Spalding (1928)
- At the Gate of Stronghold (1929)
- Catholic Colonial Maryland: A Sketch (1931)
- Arrows of Iron (1934)

=== Articles ===
- "Pere Marquette: How the People of the West have built his Monument" in The Messenger of the Sacred Heart (September 1895)
- "The Birthplace and Family of Marquette" in The Messenger of the Sacred Heart (August 1900)
- "The Grave and Relics of Father Marquette" in The Messenger of the Sacred Heart (February 1901)
- "Marquette and DeSoto: Was Marquette a Discoverer?" in The Messenger of the Sacred Heart (September 1902)
- "The Ethnologic Value of the Jesuit Relations". American Journal of Sociology (March 1929)
