= Kiswah =

Cloth cover over the Kaaba in Mecca

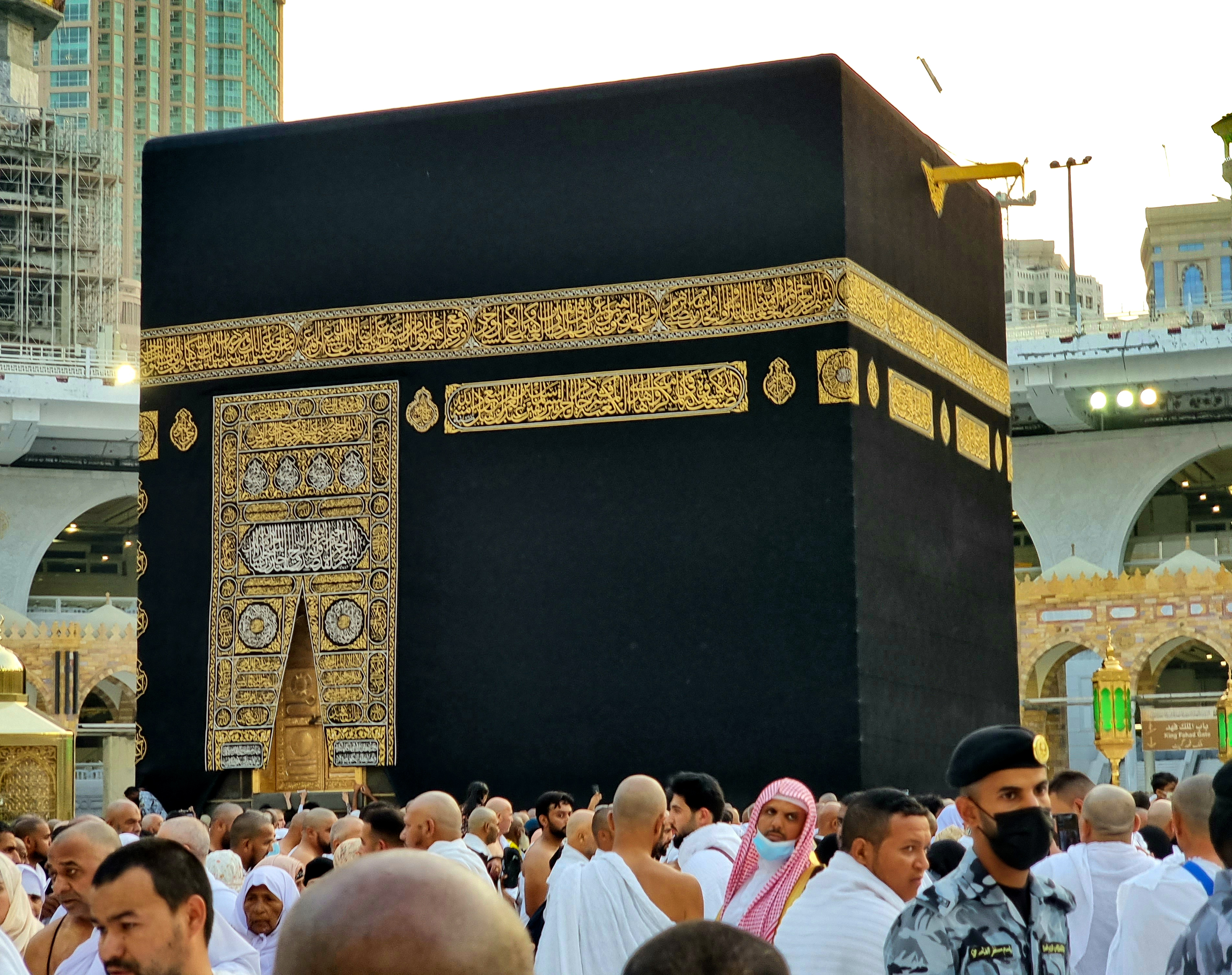
Kaaba in Makkah (Mecca)

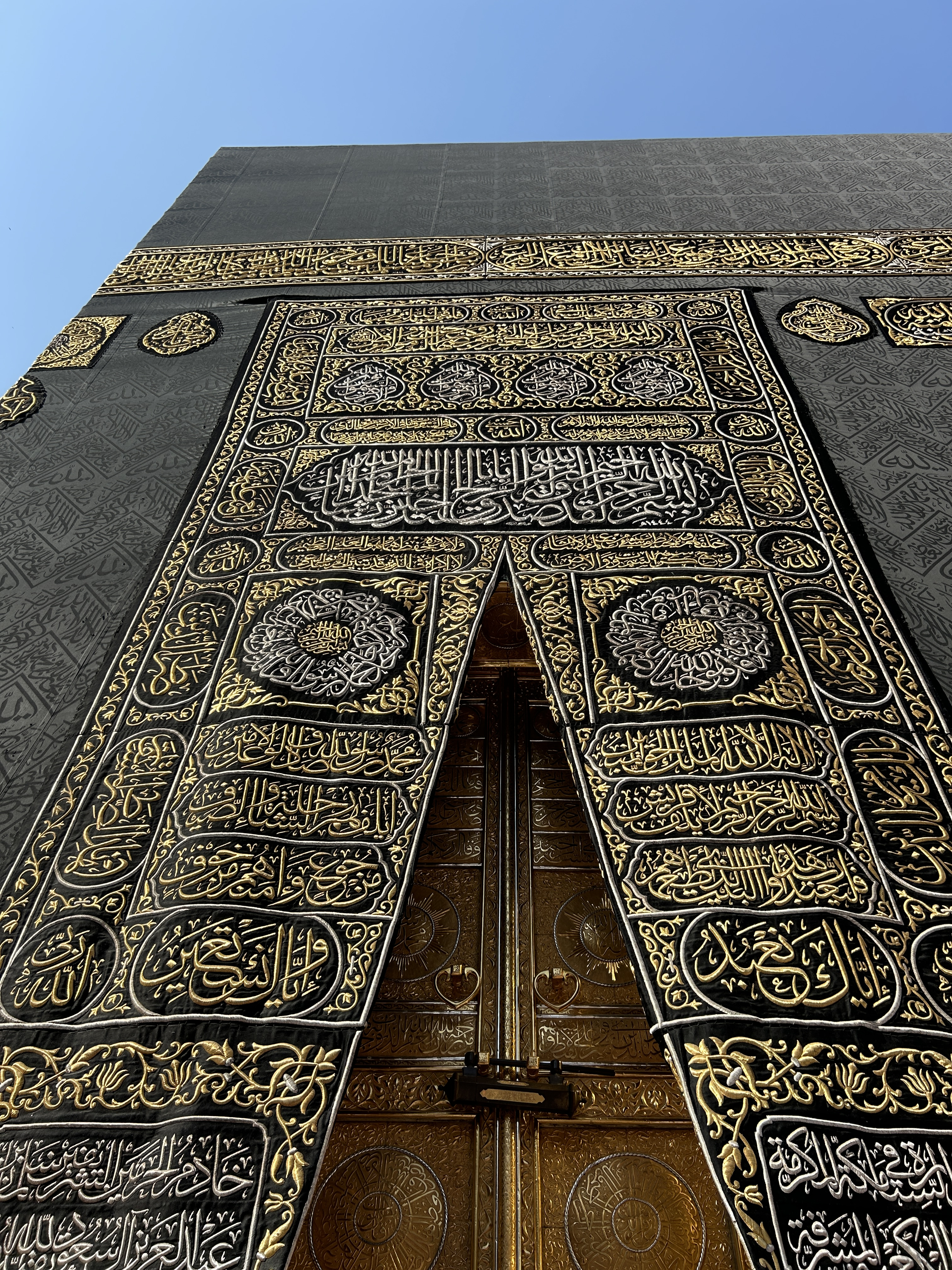
Kiswah as pictured on February 22, 2024.

The kiswah or kiswa (Arabic: كسوة الكعبة, romanized: kiswat al-kaʿba) is the cloth that covers the Kaaba in Mecca, Saudi Arabia. It is draped annually, although the draping date has changed over the years. A procession traditionally accompanies the kiswah to Mecca, a tradition dating back to the 12th century. The term kiswah has multiple translations, including 'robe' and 'garment'. Due to the iconic designs and the quality of materials used in creating the kiswah, it is considered one of the most sacred objects in Islamic art, ritual, and worship.

The annual practice of covering the Kaaba has pre-Islamic origins and was continued by Muhammad and his successors. Historically, various types of cloth and textiles have been used as draping, but Egyptian produced kiswahs were popularized by early Islamic rulers.

== History ==
=== Pre-Islamic ===
The tradition of covering the Kaaba predates the emergence of Islam, with various Yemeni textiles composing the draping. According to Ibn Hisham, King (Tubba') Abu Karib As'ad of the Himyarite Kingdom, who would later become a revered figure in Islamic traditions, clothed the Kaaba for the first time during the rule of the Jurhum tribe of Mecca in the early fifth century CE after learning about it from two Jewish rabbis after his conversion to Judaism. Abu Karib later covered the Kaaba in a striped red woolen garment, layering it atop the already existing hangings. The Quraysh (Arabic: قُرَيْشٌ), the ruling confederation of tribes in Mecca, later organized funding for the kiswah using annually collected payments from each of the tribes who worshipped there.

=== Era of Muhammad ===
Muhammad and the Muslims in Mecca did not participate in the draping of the Kaaba until the conquest of the city at 630 AD (7 AH), as the ruling tribe, the Quraysh, did not allow them to do so. When the Muslims took Mecca, they left the old hangings in place, with Muhammad adding his own kiswah of Yemeni origin. Muhammad’s successors would continue the tradition of draping the kiswah, with Umar al-Khattab (Arabic: عمر بن الخطاب) being the first caliph to send an Egyptian kiswah made out of a white linen known as qubati (Arabic: قُبْطِيّ), a type of embroidered linen manufactured by Coptic Christians living in Egypt.

=== Umayyads and Abbasids ===
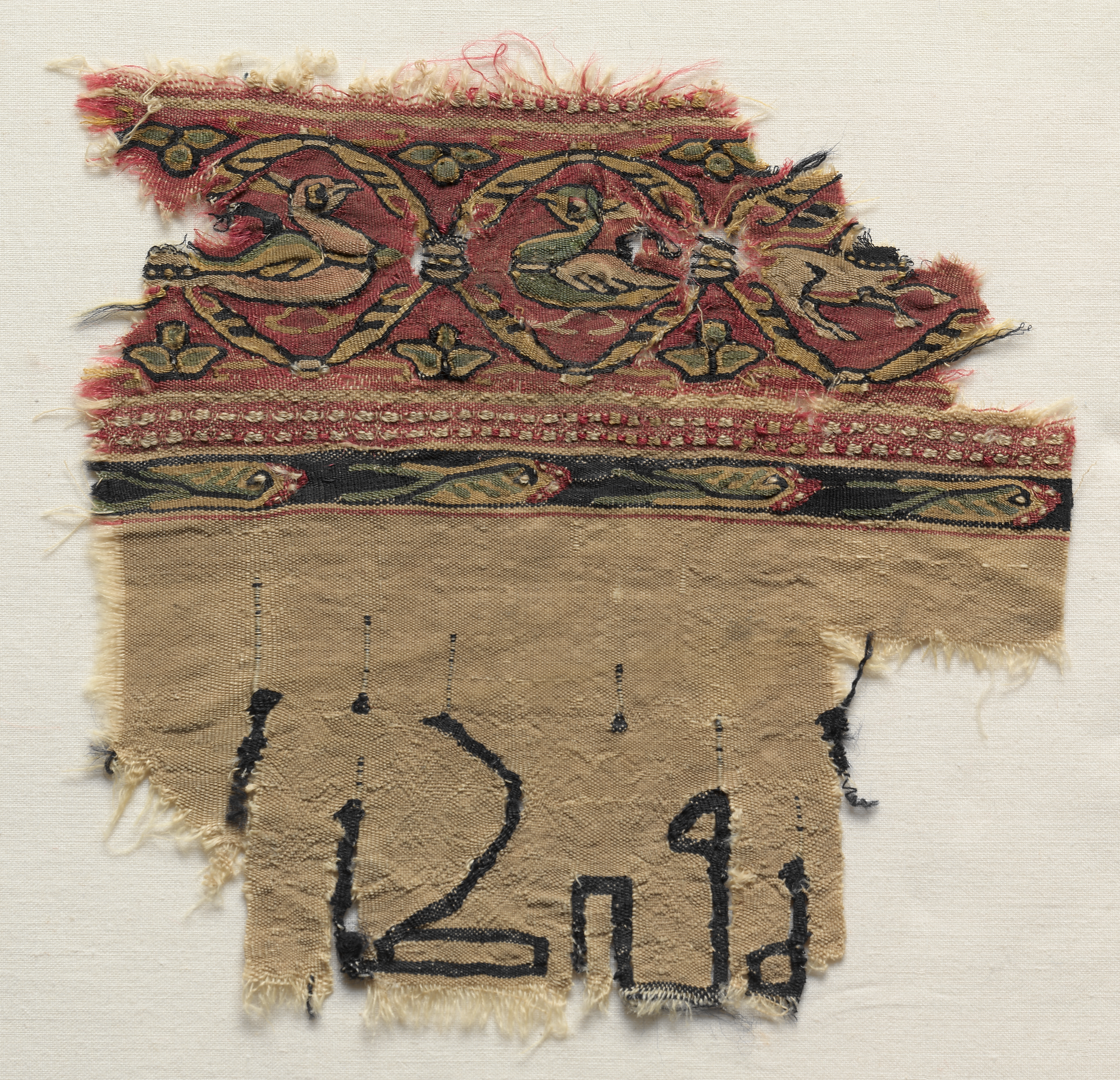
Example of Egyptian tiraz cloth that was used by Abbasid caliphs to make the kiswah.

The pre-Islamic hangings covering the Kaaba would remain until the rule of Umayyad caliph Mu'awiya (Arabic: معاوية بن أبي سفيان), who removed the old hangings after receiving complaints that they were religiously impure. A new kiswah was sent by Mu'awiya made out of silk, qubati, and striped wool. Following the original replacement of the old hangings, the caliph sent two kiswahs annually, with one being made out of qubati and the other silk; the silk kiswah is reported to have been draped over the former which would arrive in Mecca at least three months prior. Successive Umayyad caliphs maintained the precedent set by Mu'awiya, continuing to supply kiswahs made either of Egyptian linen or silk and draping them over the coverings from previous years. Much like their Umayyad predecessors, the Abbasids continued to rely on Egyptian factories for the production of the kiswah. The Abbasid caliph Al-Mahdi, following his pilgrimage to Mecca in 777 CE, established the precedent of annually removing and replacing the old kiswah after realizing the accumulated weight from the old kiswahs could structurally compromise the Kaaba.

=== Location of manufacture ===
From the time of the Ayyubids, precisely during the reign of as-Salih Ayyub, the kiswah was manufactured in Egypt, with material sourced locally as well as from Sudan, India, and Iraq. The Amir al-Hajj (commander of the hajj caravan), who was directly designated by the sultans of the Mamluk, and later, Ottoman Empires, transported the kiswah from Egypt to Mecca on an annual basis. Muhammad Ali Pasha of Egypt ordered the expenses for making the kiswah to be met by his state treasury in the early 19th century. Since then, Dar Al-Khoronfosh, a workshop in Cairo's Al-Gamaleya district, had been selected for the task of making the kiswah, and continued this role throughout the reign of the Egyptian monarchy. After the takeover of the Hijaz region, and from 1927 onward, its manufacture was partially moved to Mecca and then fully transferred in 1962, when Egypt ceased production; the facility is now the King Abdulaziz Complex for the Holy Kaaba Kiswa.

=== Women ===
The year 2024 was the first in recorded history during which women were involved in the ceremonial replacement of the kiswah. That year, women working for the General Authority for the Care of the Two Holy Mosques were involved in carrying parts of the new kiswah and giving them to men, before the men took them to Mecca.

=== Disposal ===
Old kiswahs are divided into pieces, which may later be sold or put on display.

During the January 2026 release of the Epstein files, emails from February and March 2017 detailed a shipment of the three pieces of the sacred cloth delivered to convicted paedophile Jeffrey Epstein, arranged through contacts in the United Arab Emirates.

== Historic procession ==
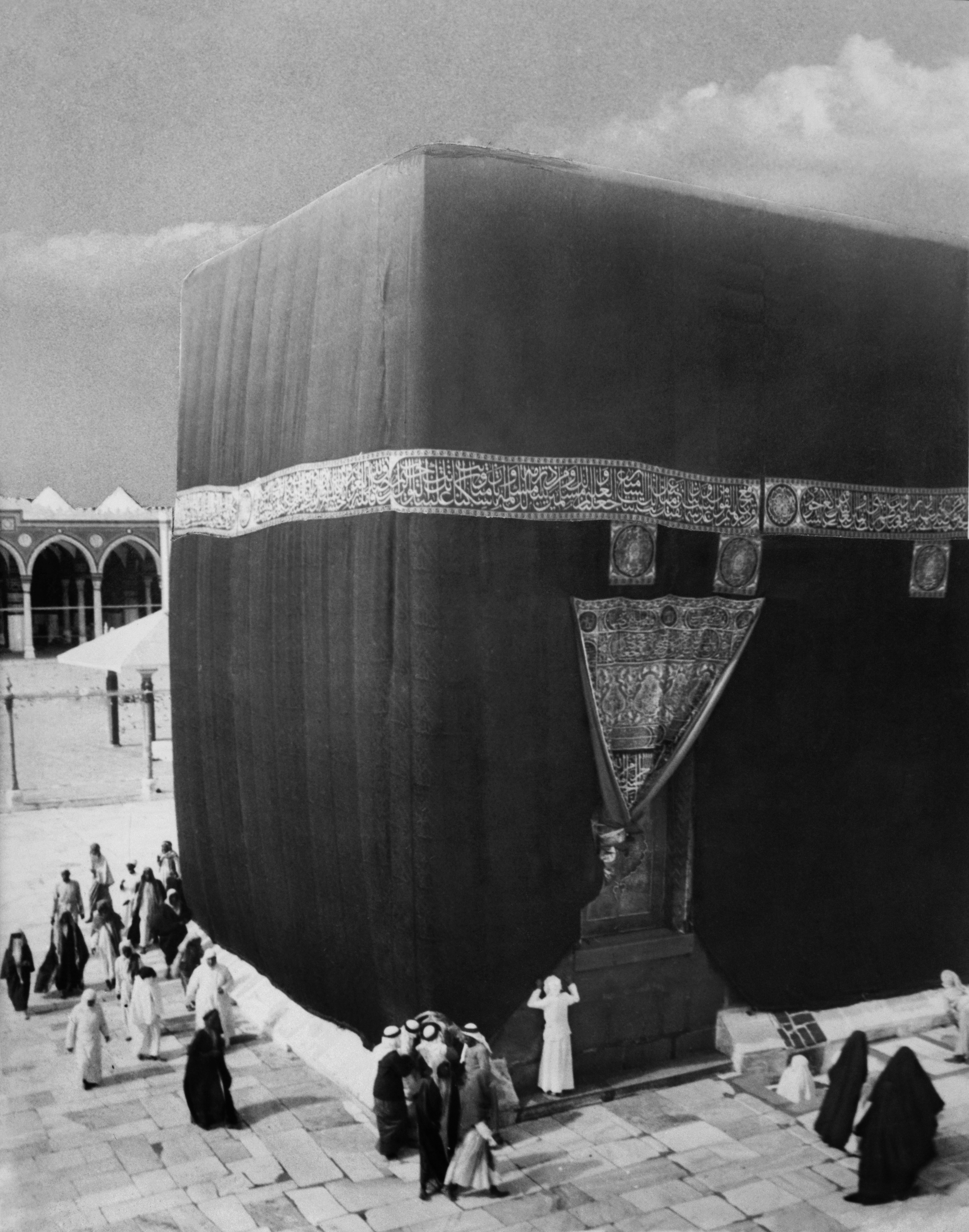
The 1910 kiswah covering the Kaaba in Mecca

The procession of the kiswah and its journey to Mecca dates back to 1184 CE from an account by Ibn Jubayr. According to Ibn Jubayr, the kiswah was brought to Mecca via camel from its place of creation along with an elaborate procession of drums and flags. The kiswah was then placed on the roof of the Kaaba once it reached Mecca, still folded.

The tradition of the kiswah being accompanied by a covering called the mahmal during the trip to Mecca is said to have started during the rule of Queen Shajar al-Durr, however the practice was not widely accepted as tradition until the 15th century. It is unclear whether the mahmal carries the kiswah itself or simply accompanies the cloth to Mecca due to the lack of access to the processional covering; however, it is said that in modern times the mahmal carries the new kiswah to Mecca and then takes the old kiswah to Cairo after the Hajj is completed.

== Design and textiles ==
=== Design ===
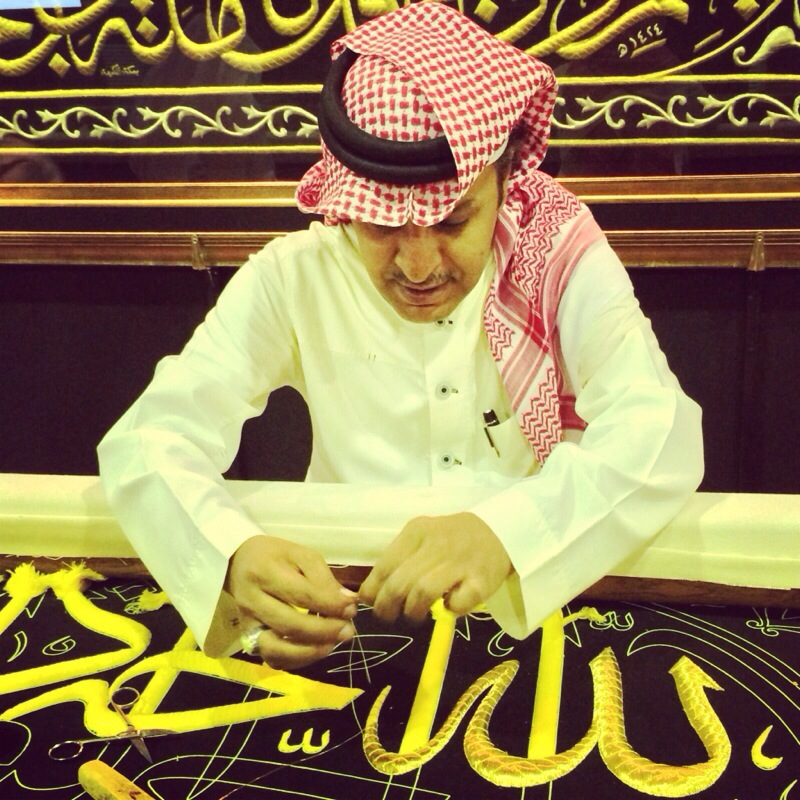
An artisan embroidering cloth with gold thread.

Today the kiswah's design features the colors black, gold, and silver. Black silk comprises the entirety of the garment, displaying large unaccented sections and providing background to the portions with inscriptions. The gold and silver comprise the inscriptions and accents that embellish the garment. Rendered in the Thuluth calligraphy style, these characters overlap each other and protrude slightly from the kiswah itself. The Sura Ikhlas appears in circular medallions inscribed within squares at each of the four corners of the kiswah: Rukn al-Hajjar al-Aswad (Arabic: ركن الحجر الأسواد), Rukn al-'Iraqi (Arabic: الركن العراقي), Rukn al-Yamani (Arabic: الركن اليماني), and Rukn ush-Shami (Arabic: الركن الشامي). These are beneath the hizam where longer Qur'anic verses appear. Artisans carefully interweave gold and silver wire to create these elements. Previous iterations have featured more colorful and varied design programs. However, kiswahs dating earlier than the Ottoman period are rare, due to both the natural process of decay and the now-defunct practice of cutting the kiswah and selling the pieces to pilgrims.

=== Textiles ===
The textile covering of the Kaaba has multiple parts, including the hizam (Arabic: حزام) and sitara (Arabic: سِتَارَة) or burqu' (Arabic: برقع). The earliest known still-extant sitara was manufactured in Egypt and dates to 1544, and the earliest Ottoman hizam was made for Selim II in the late 16th century. The basic designs of the hizam and sitara have changed little over time, although the embroidery in gold and silver wire has become more ornate. All inscriptions on the kiswah, hizam, sitara, and supplemental textiles use the Thuluth (Arabic: ثُلُث) style of calligraphy. Between 1817 and 1927, the kiswah was manufactured at the Dar al-Kiswah, a dedicated workshop in Cairo, Egypt. In 1927 textile manufacturing moved to a workshop in Mecca.

=== Kiswah ===
The term kiswah refers to the overall covering of the Kaaba. The fabric contains 670 kilograms (1,480 lb) of imported white silk thread that is then dyed black. Jacquard machines weave the black thread into either plain or patterned cloth equaling 47 pieces of cloth measuring 98 centimetres (39 in) by 14 metres (46 ft). The patterned cloth contains inscriptions taken from the Shahada (Arabic: ٱلشَّهَادَةُ) incorporated into the fabric during the weaving process. Each panel of cloth is then stretched over a loom and templates of verses from the Quran and Islamic ornamental patterns are applied using silk screens. Embroidered decorative elements, Quranic verses, and prayers are hand-embroidered by Saudi artisans using gold and silver thread. The only stylistic requirement for the text and decorations is that it must be visible from a distance. Once the embroidery is applied the cloth is sewn together and a white cotton calico backing is applied for support. The finished kiswah measures 658 square metres (7,080 sq ft) and costs 22 million SAR to produce.

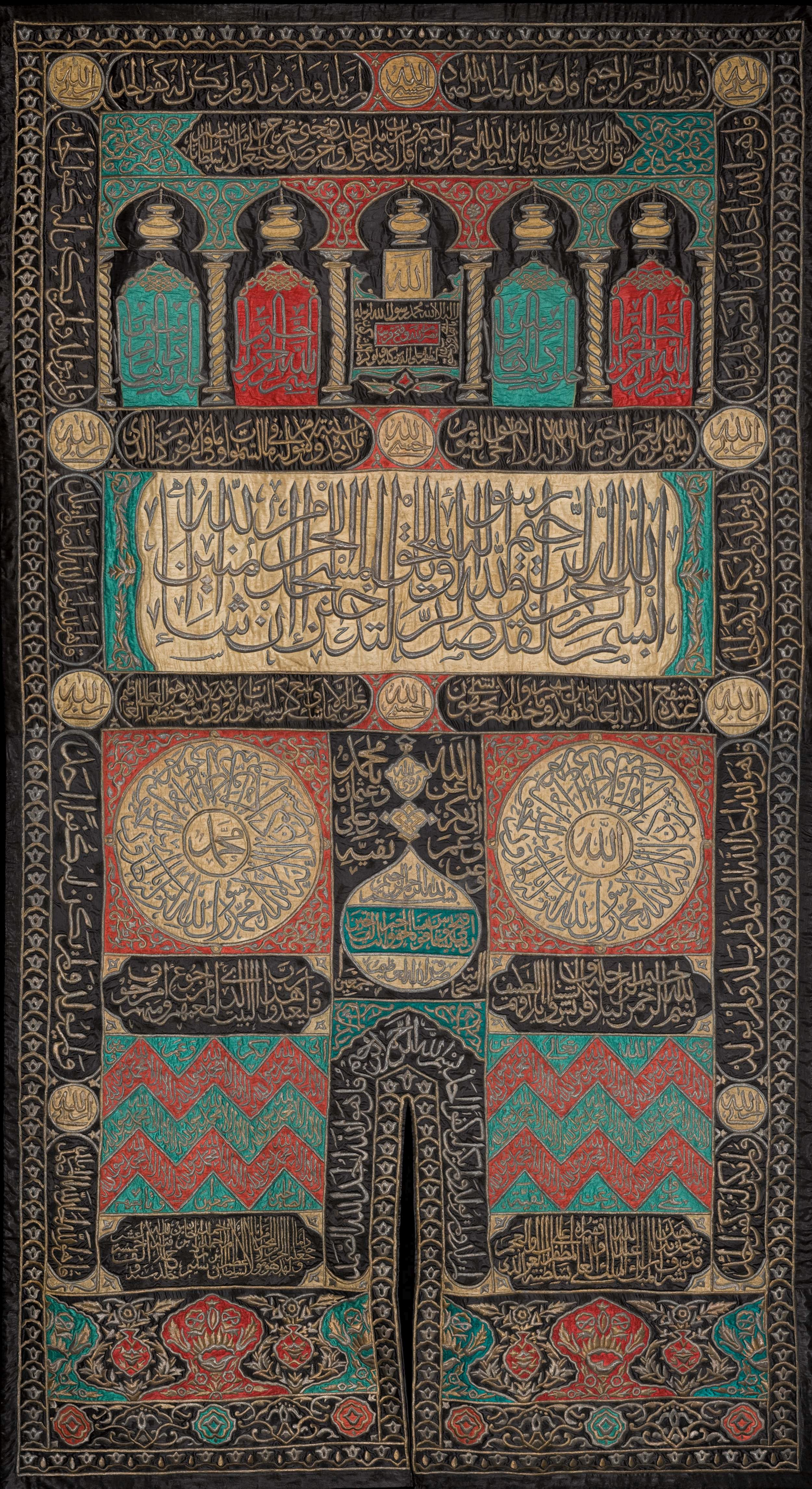
Sitara for the door of the Kaaba, made in Cairo, 1606 CE (Khalili Collection of Hajj and the Arts of Pilgrimage)

=== Hizam ===
Two-thirds of the way up the kiswah is an embroidered band called the hizam. The band comprises 16 pieces of silk cloth with four pieces attached to each side of the Kaaba. Assembled, the hizam measures 47 metres (154 ft) in length and 95 centimetres (37 in) in width. The text on the hizam consists of Quranic verses embroidered with gold and silver thread. Under the belt at each corner of the Kaaba is an additional set of square panels of cloth called the kardashiyyat containing the Surah of Ikhlas (Arabic: الْإِخْلَاص).

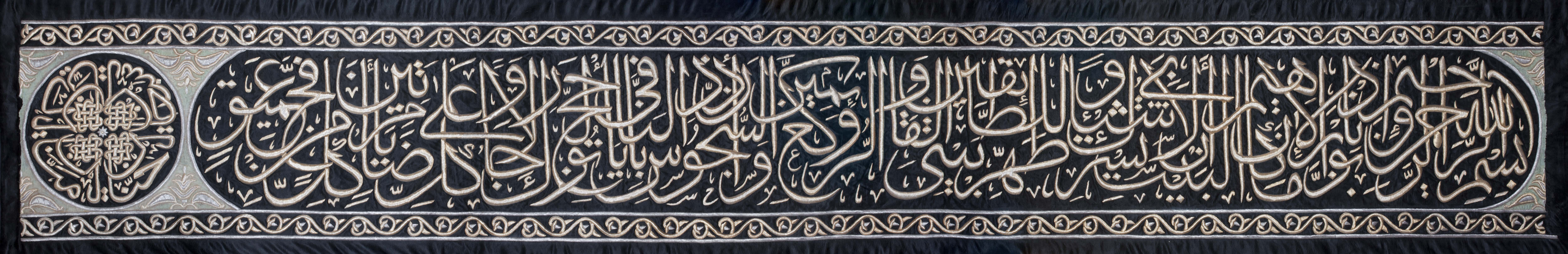
Section from the hizam; late 19th century, Cairo, Egypt. Text contains the basmalah, followed by verses 26 and 27 from Surat al-Hajj

=== Sitara ===
Over the exterior door to the Kaaba is a cover called the burqu' or sitara. This panel is the most elaborately decorated portion of the kiswah. The sitara has an average size of 7.75 by 3.5 metres (25.4 by 11.5 ft) and is assembled by sewing together four separate cloth panels. Each panel contains embroidered verses from the Quran and additional dedications.

=== Additional textiles ===
Other textiles used in covering portions of the Kaaba include a curtain hung over the Bab al-Tawba door in the interior of the Kaaba. Also remade each year is the green silk bag which holds the key to the Kaaba, a tradition introduced in 1987. Along with these textiles, the workshops send ropes for attaching the kiswah to the Kaaba, and spare silk in case the kiswah needs repair. Degradation and disfiguration caused by exposure to natural elements necessitate regular maintenance.

== Gallery ==
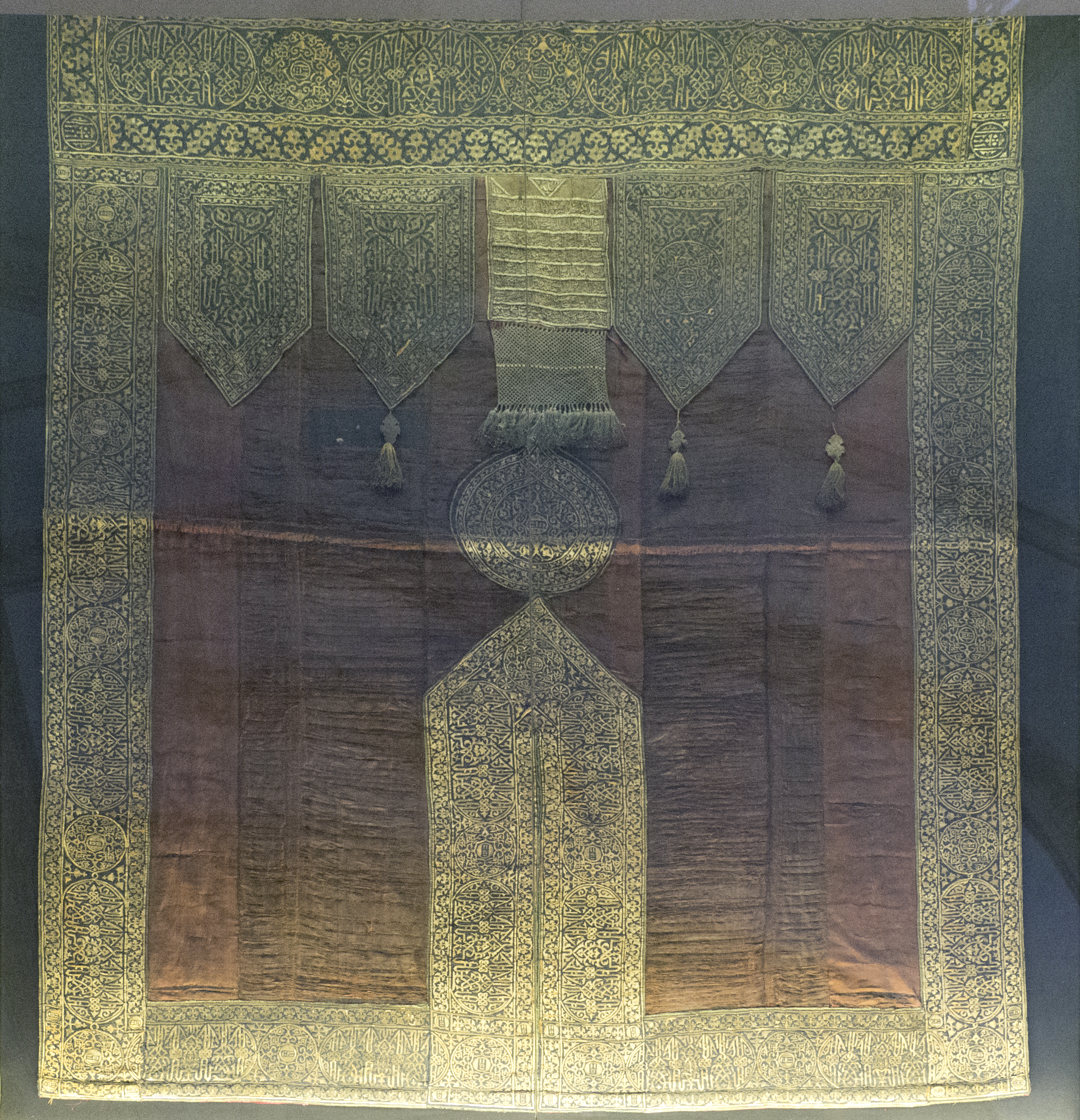
Kiswah from 1517

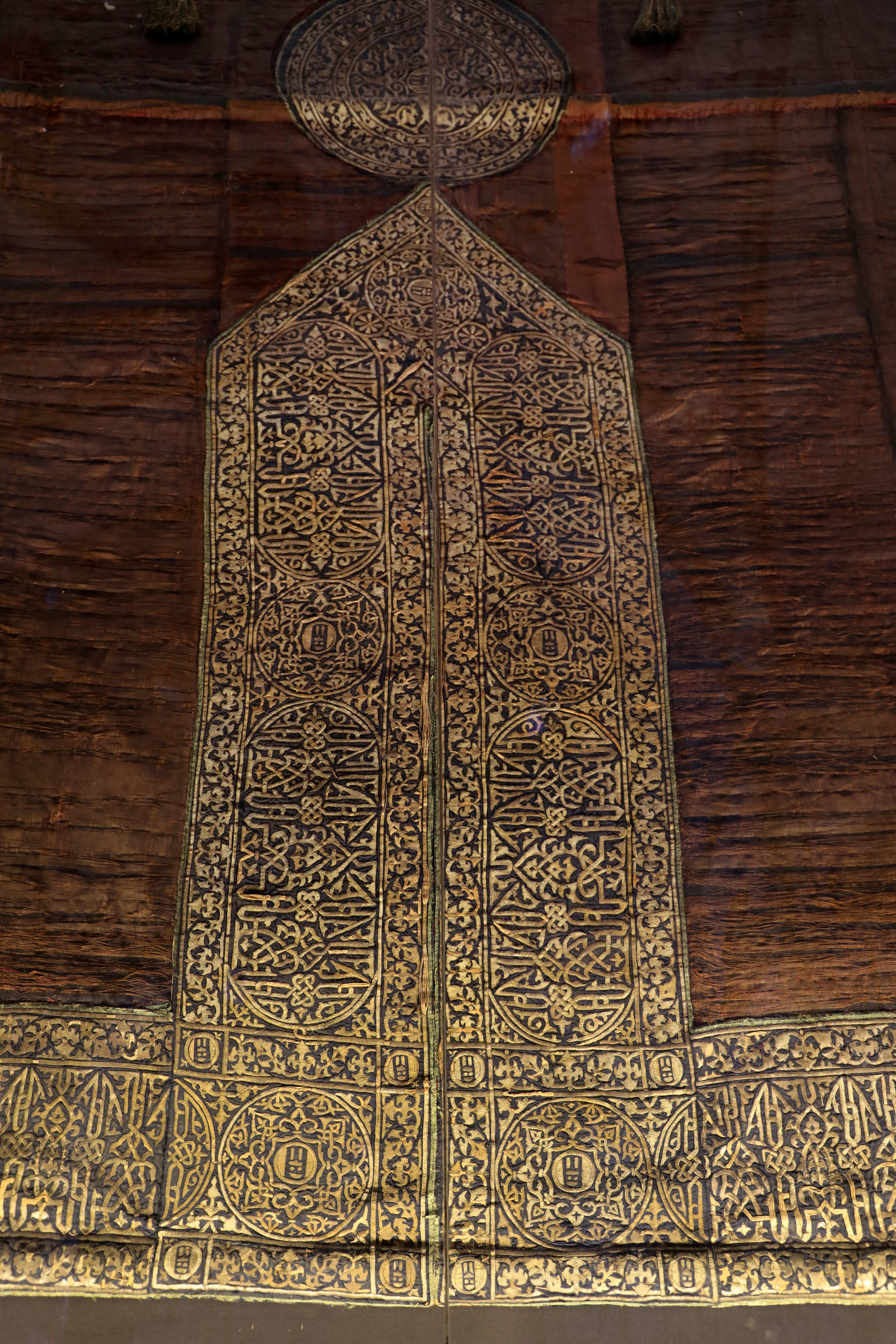
1517 Details

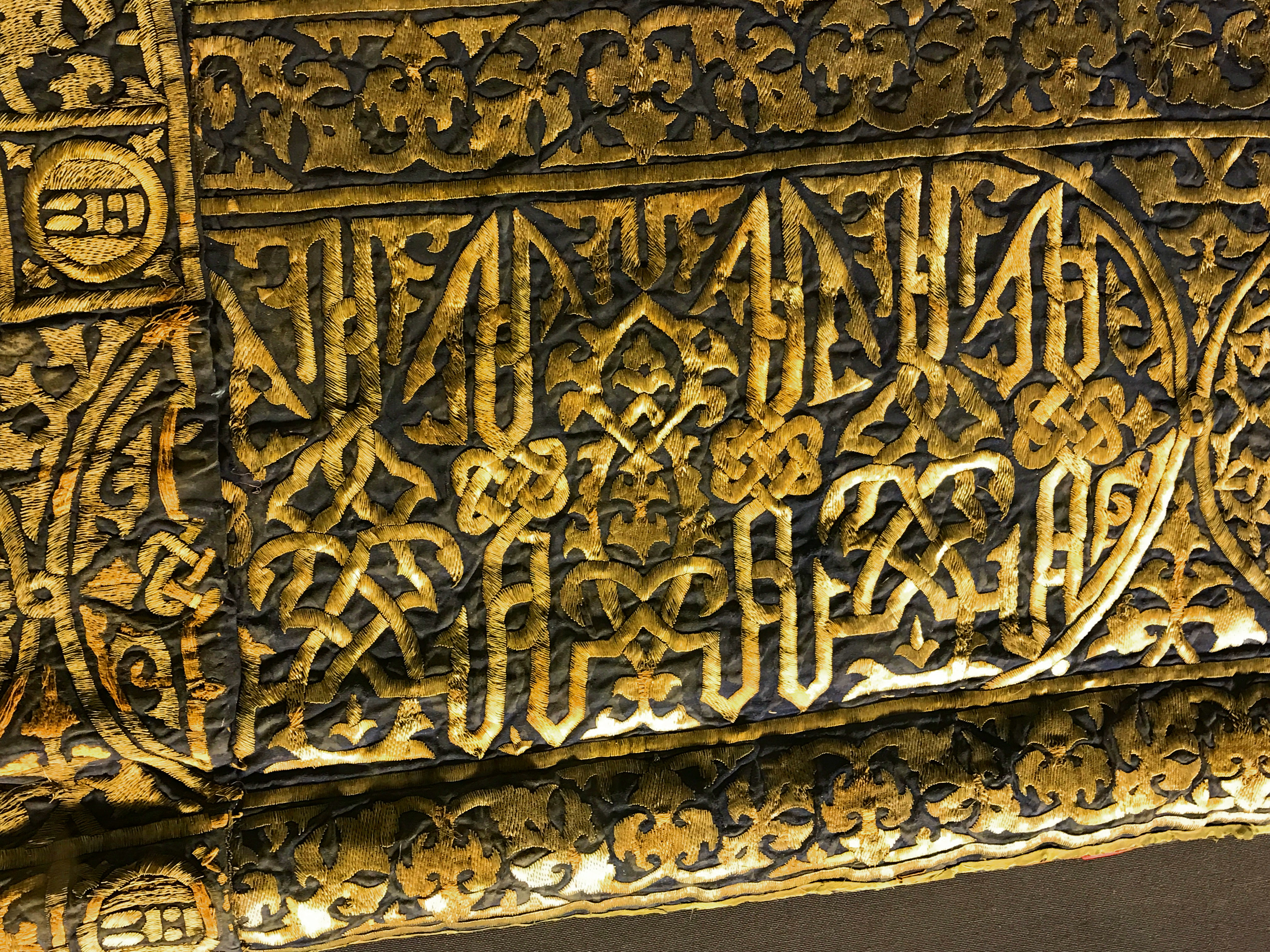
1517 Details

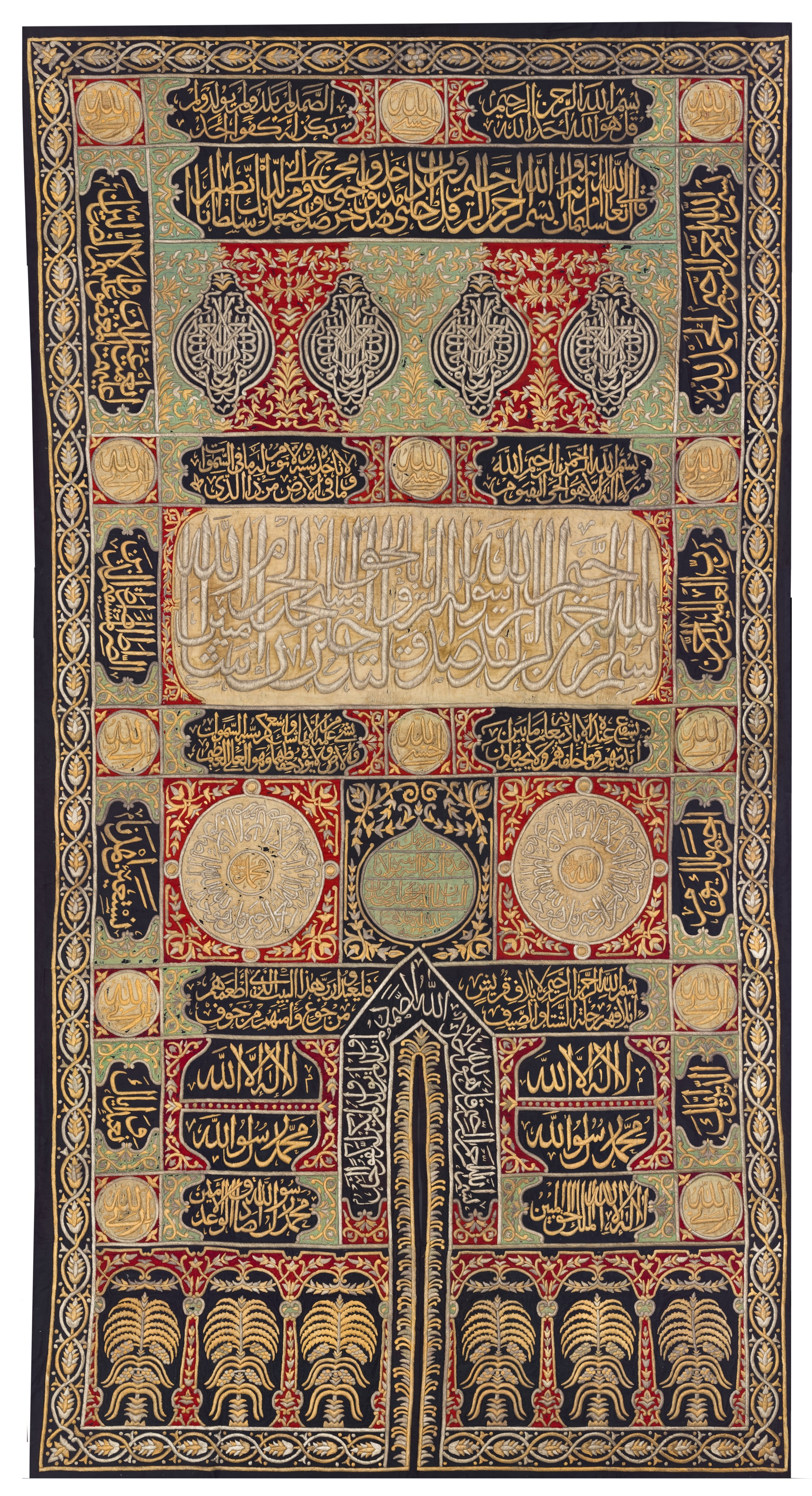
1846

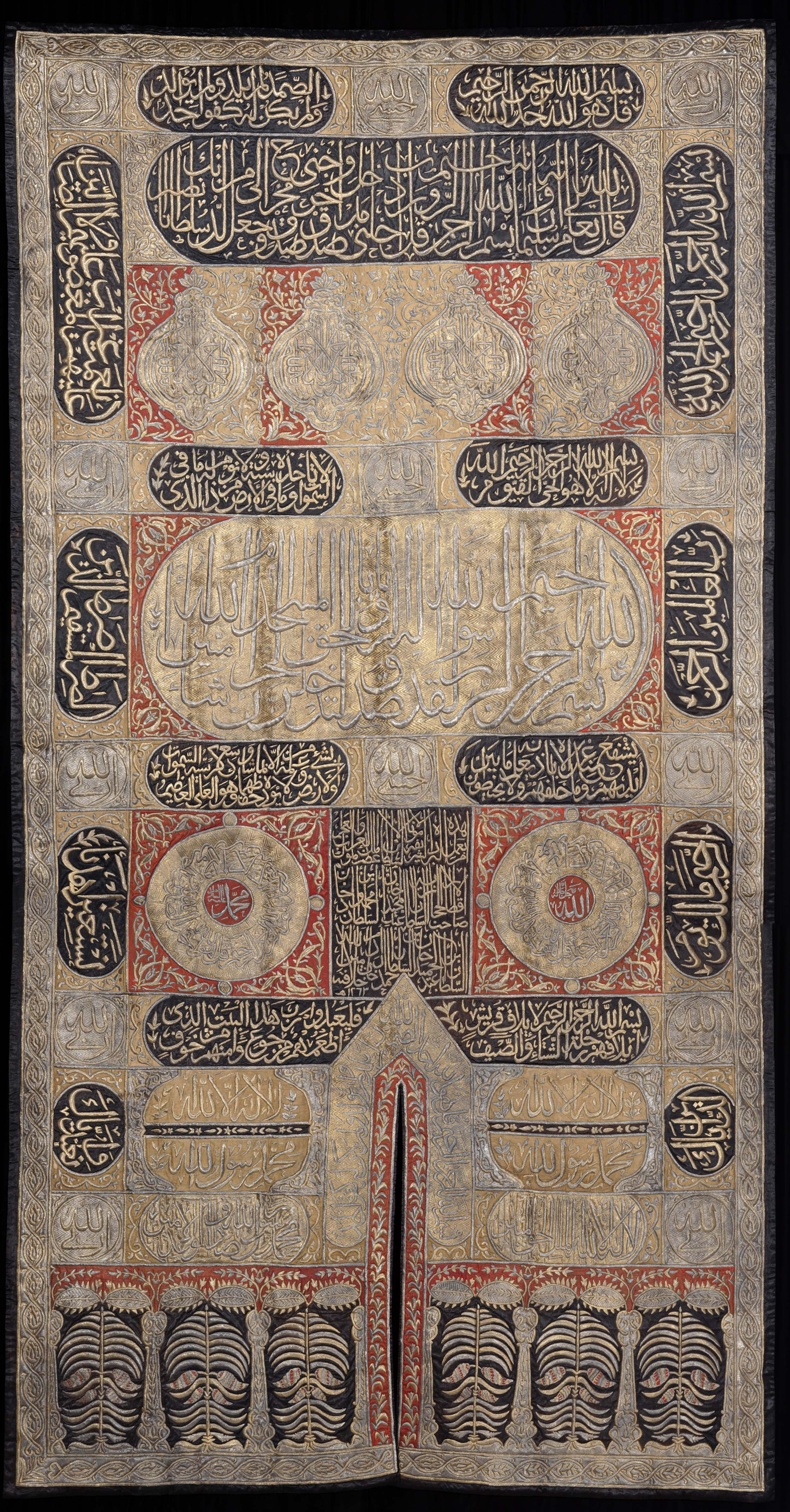
1847

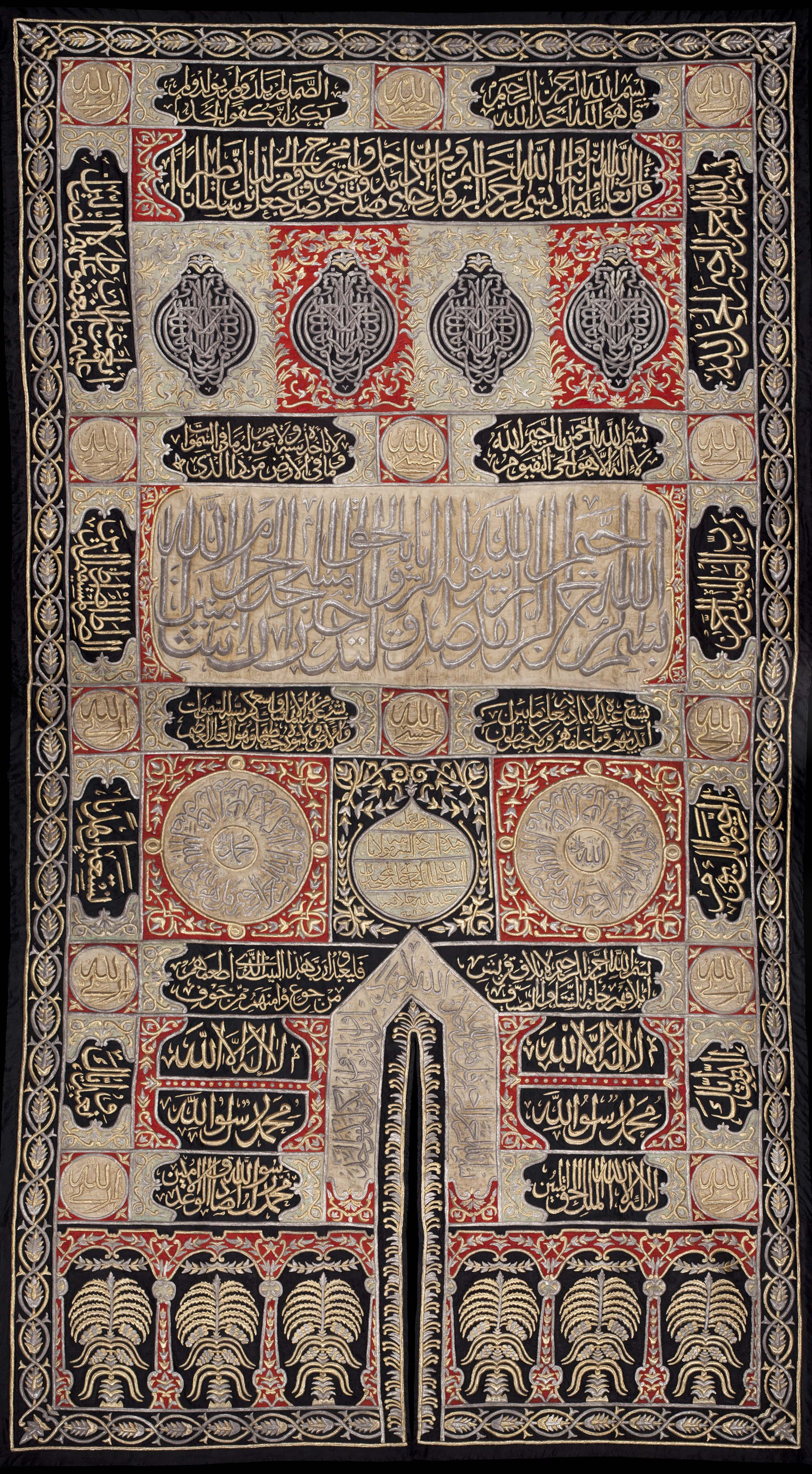
1849

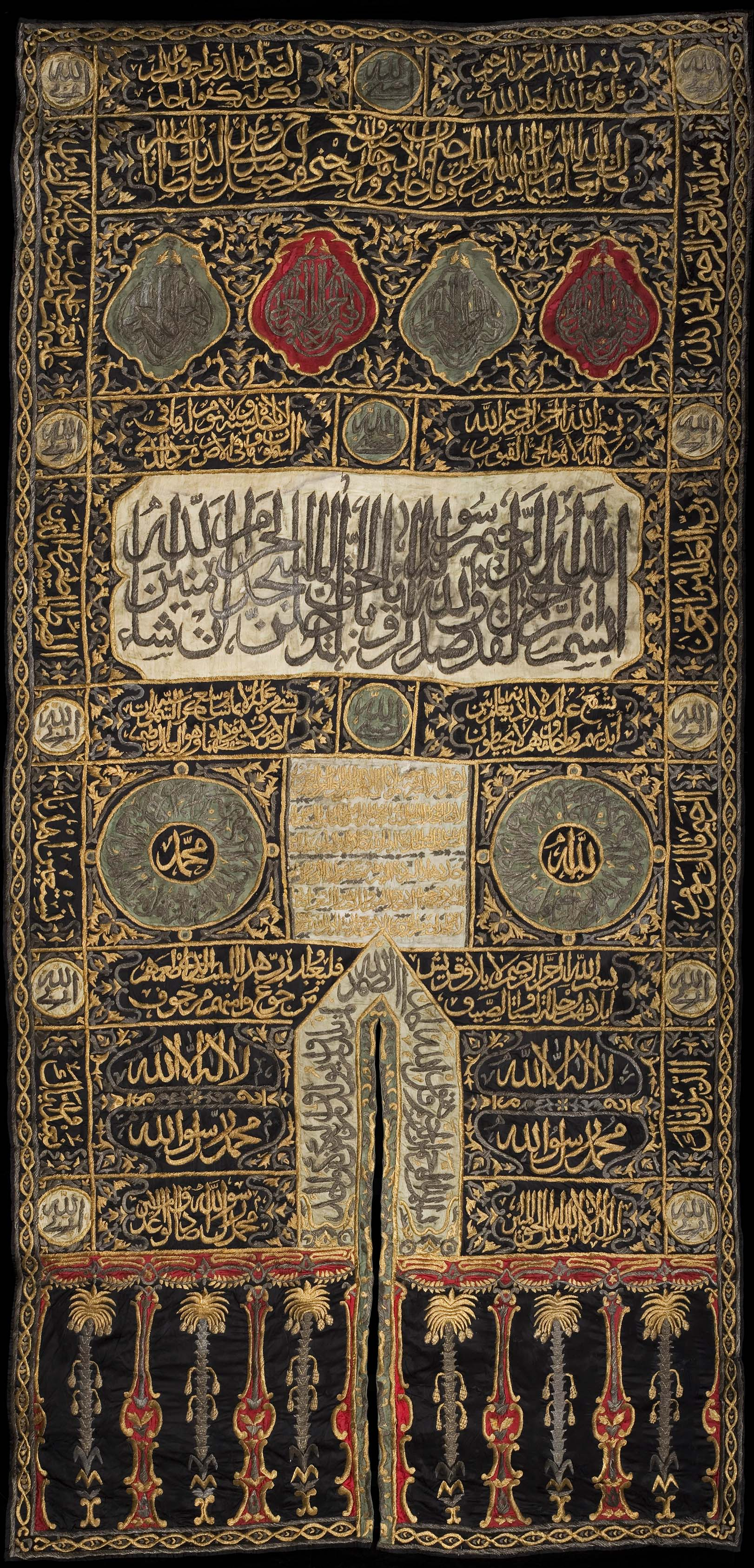
1855

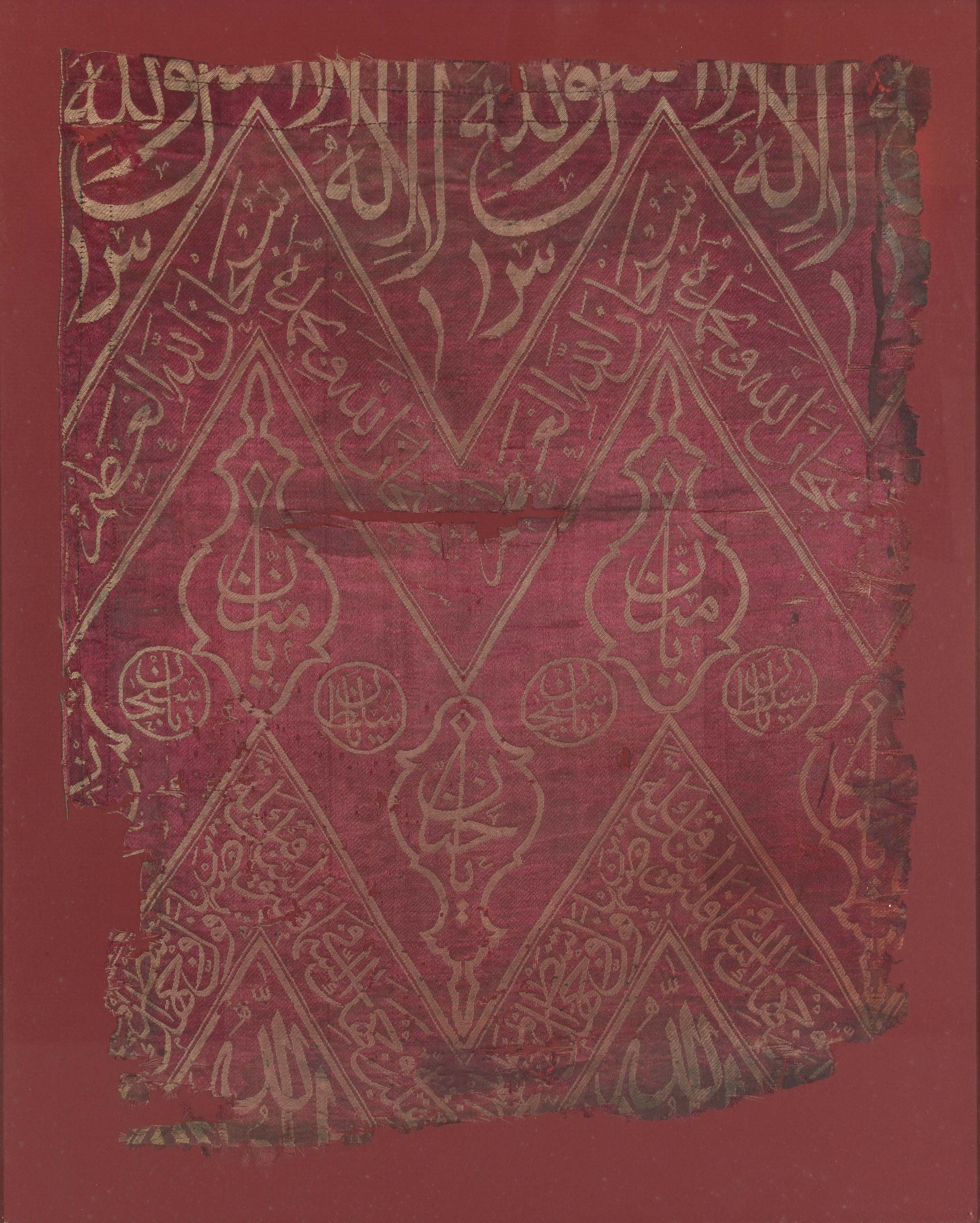
1861, Internal Kiswah

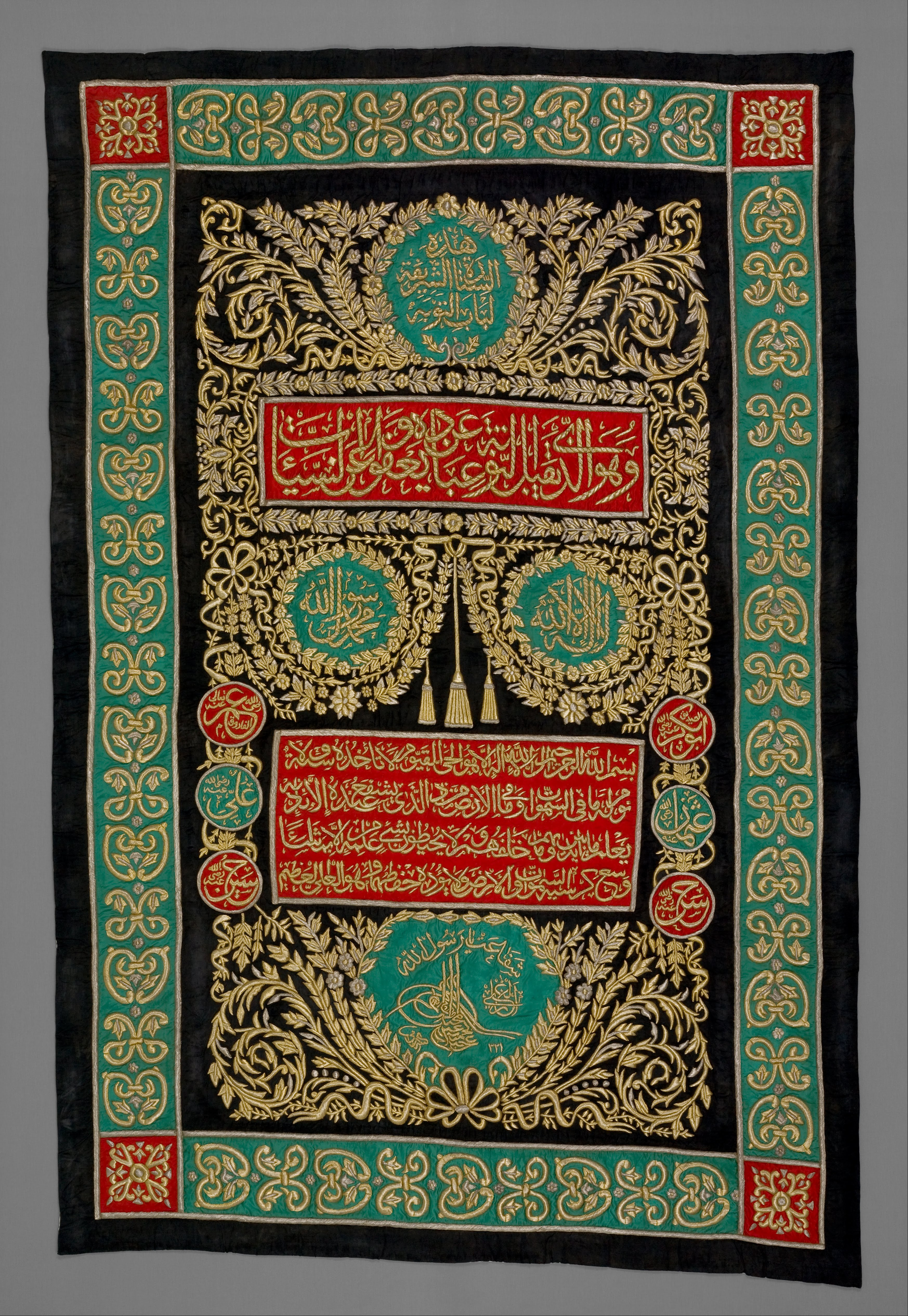
1903

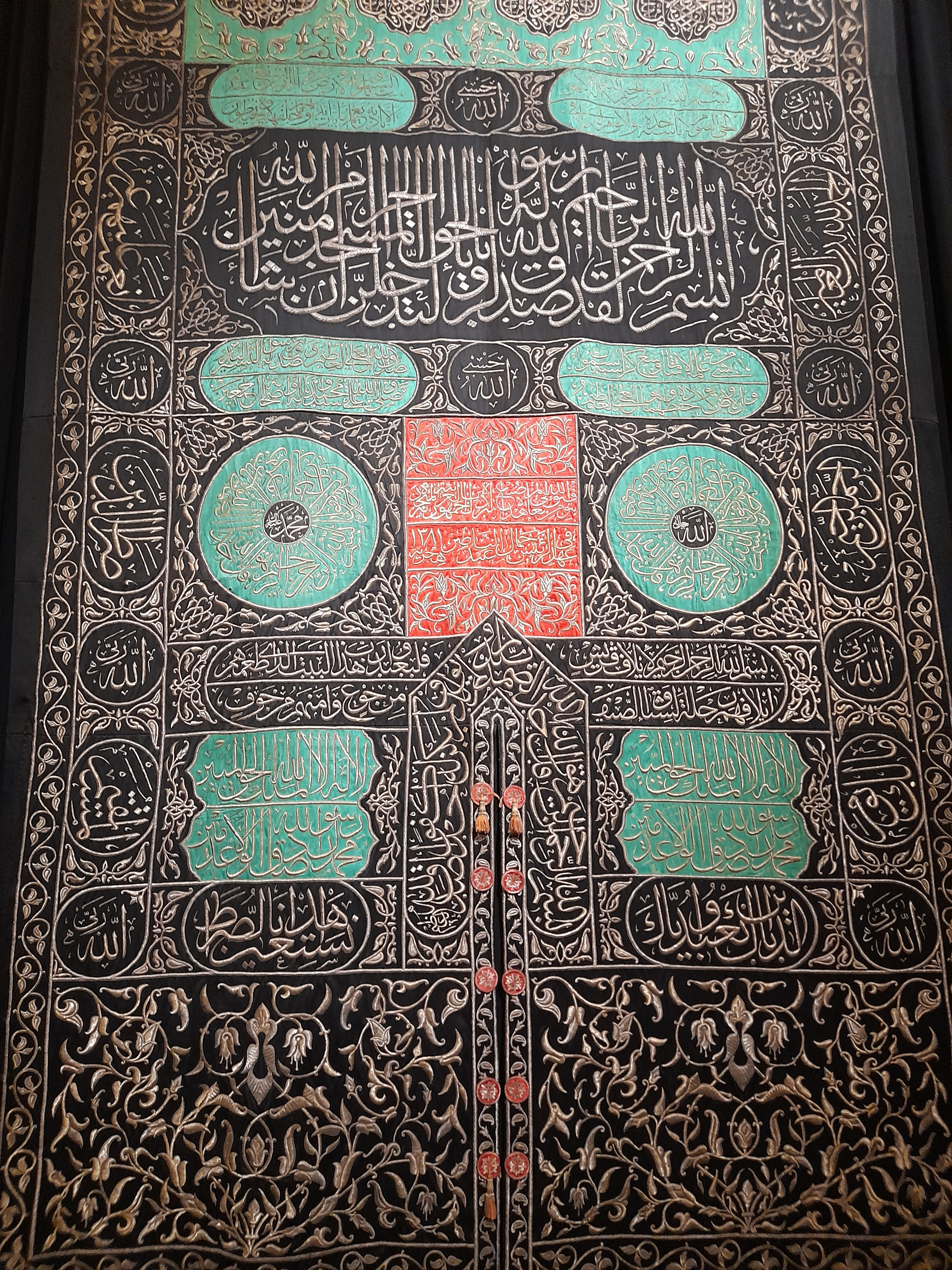
Last Egyptian Kiswah

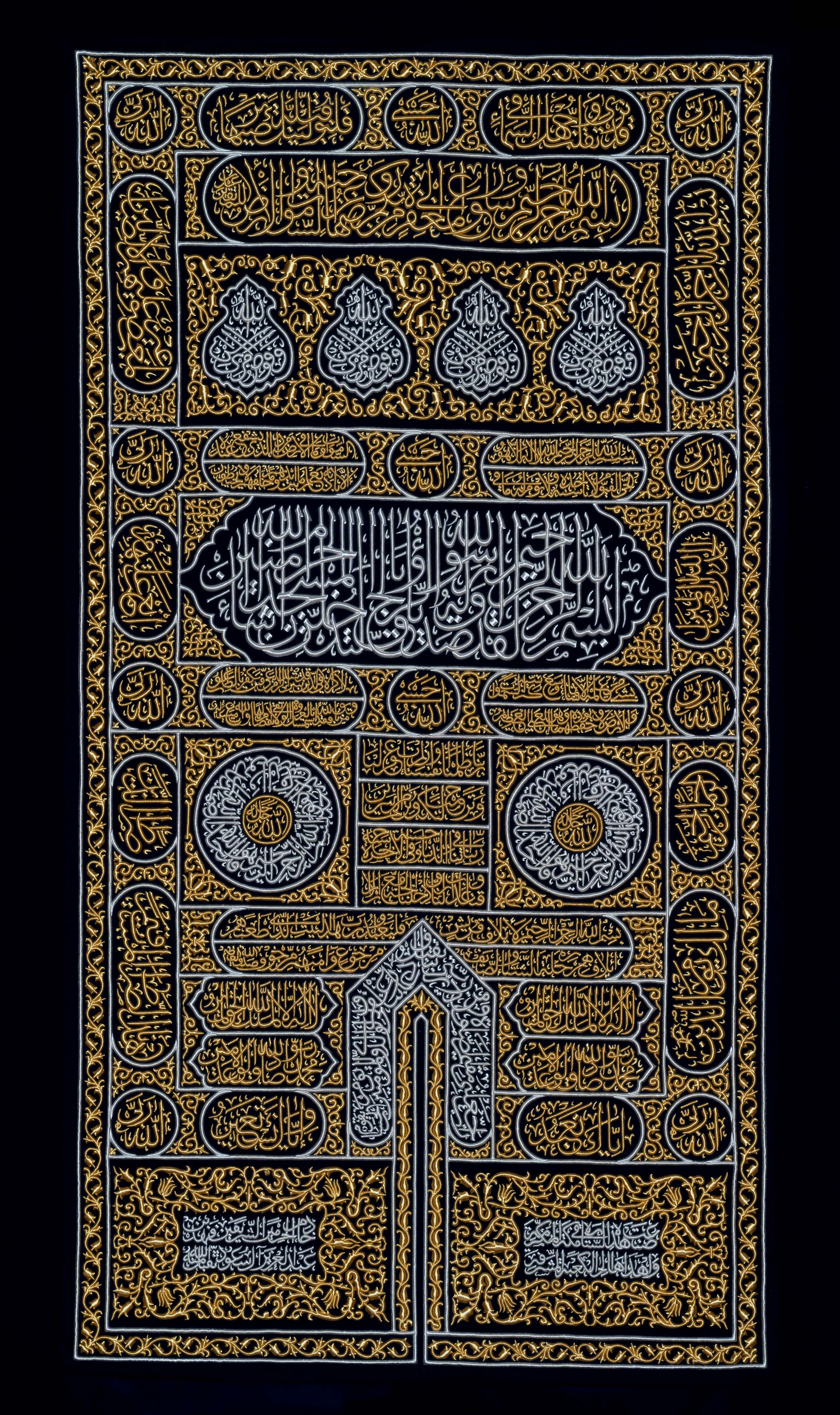
1980s

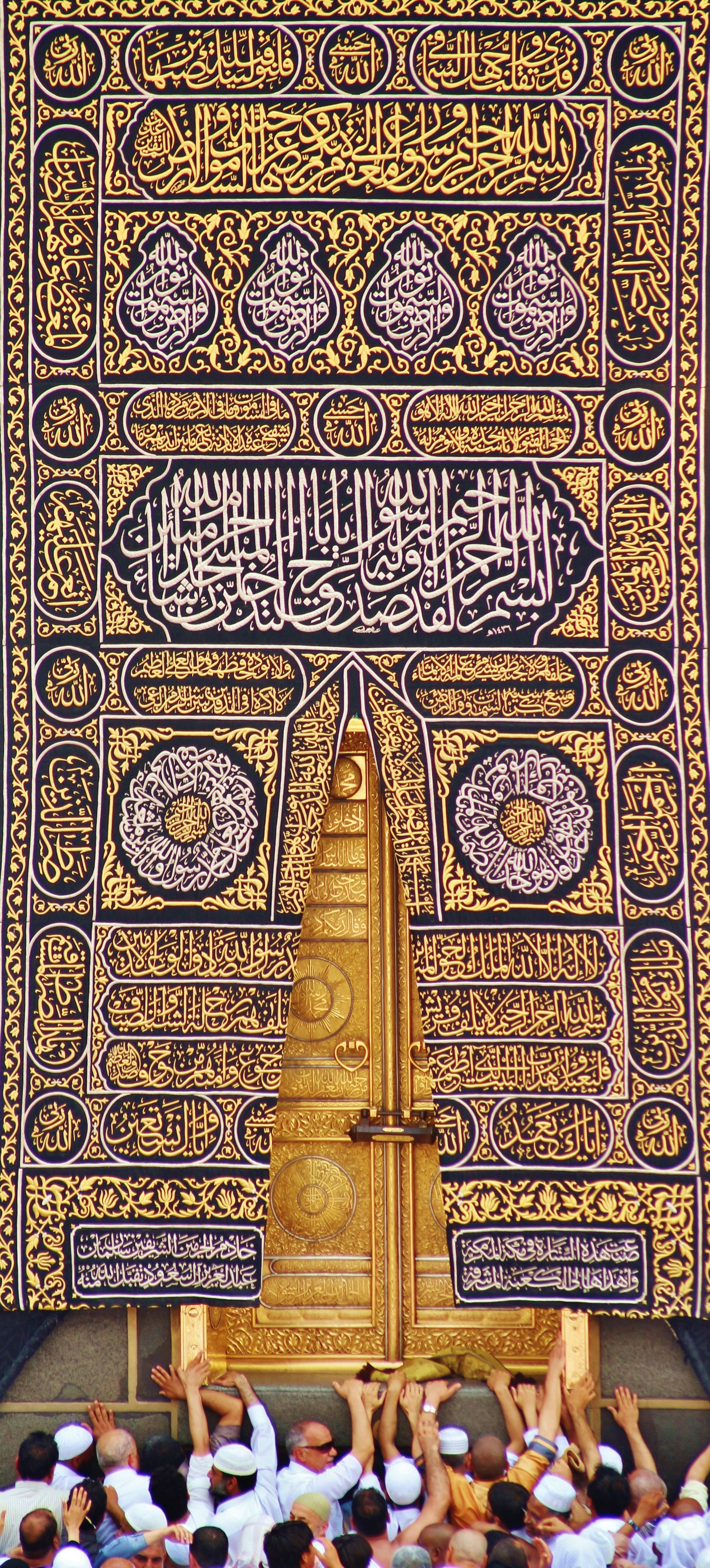
2016
