= King Abdulaziz Complex for Holy Kaaba Kiswa =

Manufacturing facility for Kiswah in Mecca, Saudi Arabia

King Abdulaziz Complex for the Holy Kaaba Kiswa
- مجمع الملك عبدالعزيز لكسوة الكعبة المشرفة
- Interactive map of the King Abdulaziz Complex for the Holy Kaaba Kiswa area
- Former names: Kiswa Factory of the Holy Kaaba (until 2018)
- Alternative names: Kiswah Factory

General information
- Type: Manufacturing facility
- Location: Mecca, Saudi Arabia
- Coordinates: 21°26′05″N 39°45′23″E
- Named for: King Abdulaziz Al Saud
- Construction started: 1927
- Renovated: 1977
- Governing body: General Presidency of Haramain
- Industry: Textile manufacturing
- Products: Kiswah (including the hizam and sitara); Green kiswah for the inside of the Kaaba; Kiswah for the Prophet's Chamber

The King Abdulaziz Complex for Holy Kaaba Kiswa (Arabic: مجمع الملك عبدالعزيز لكسوة الكعبة المشرفة) is a specialized facility in Mecca, Saudi Arabia, responsible for producing the kiswah, the black silk covering adorned with Quran verses that envelops the Kaaba in the Masjid al-Haram. The complex oversees the design, manufacturing, and annual replacement of the kiswah, which comprise a significant religious and cultural tradition in Islam.

== History ==
The tradition of covering the Kaaba dates back to the pre-Islamic era. During the reign of Caliph al-Ma'mun, the Kiswah was replaced three times a year. The practice of inscribing on the Kiswah began during the Abbasid era, with caliphs recording their names and the place and date of manufacture.

In 1927, King Abdulaziz Al Saud established the first Kiswah workshop in Mecca, marking the beginning of domestic production. This initiative aimed to reduce reliance on imports and ensure the quality and authenticity of the covering.

The facility, formerly known as the Kiswa Factory of the Holy Kaaba, was renamed in 2018 by royal decree issued by King Salman to the King Abdulaziz Complex for the Holy Kaaba Kiswa in honour of the founding king.

== Location and organisation ==
Situated in Mecca, the complex operates under the General Presidency of Haramain. It encompasses various departments, including dyeing, weaving (both manual and machine), printing, embroidery, gilding, sewing, and quality control.

In addition to manufacturing the Kiswah of Kaaba and its components such as the hizam (belt) and sitara (door curtain), the complex also produces the inner green coloured Kiswa of the Kaaba and the covering for the Prophet's burial chamber.

== Materials and manufacture ==
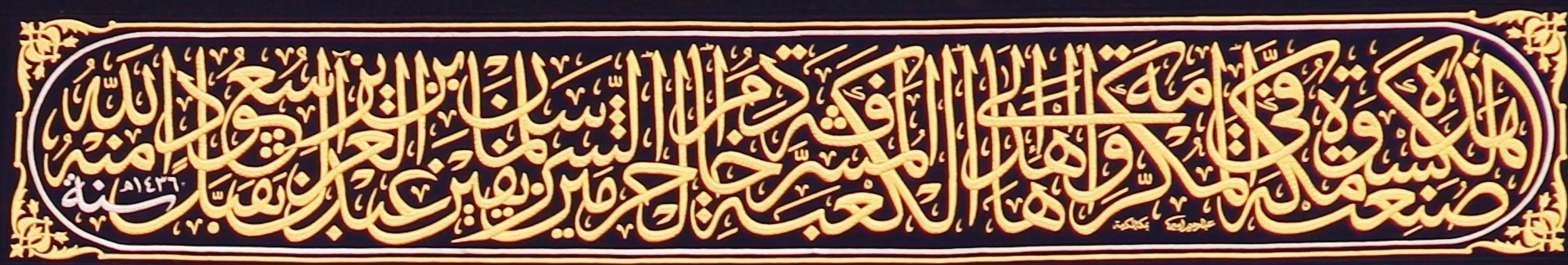
Quran verses embroidered on Kiswah with gold-plated silver threads

The Kiswah is crafted from black-dyed natural silk and embroidered with gold and silver-plated threads. The process involves several stages:

1. Dyeing: Silk threads are dyed using desalinated water to prevent damage to the fabric.
2. Weaving: The dyed silk is woven into large panels.
3. Printing: Quran verses are printed onto the fabric.
4. Embroidery: Skilled artisans embroider the printed verses using gold and silver-plated threads.
5. Assembly: The embroidered panels are sewn together to form the complete Kiswah.

Each year, approximately 825 kilograms of silk, 410 kilograms of raw cotton, 120 kilograms of gold-plated silver thread, and 60 kilograms of pure silver are used in the production.

== Annual replacement ceremony ==
The Kiswah is currently replaced annually on the 1st of Muharram, the first day of the Islamic lunar calendar. Historically, the replacement was performed on the Day of Arafah, before the shift to the current schedule. The ceremony involves the removal of the old Kiswah and the installation of the new covering, a process carried out by a team of trained craftsmen.

=== Participation of women ===
In 2024, for the first time in recorded history, women participated in the ceremonial replacement of the Kiswah. Female employees of the General Presidency for the Affairs of the Two Holy Mosques assisted in manufacturing and also by carrying sections of the new Kiswah and handing them to male colleagues, who then transported the pieces to the Kaaba in Mecca.

== See also ==
- Dar al-Kiswa, previous location of manufacture of the kiswah
- Zamzam Well
