= Maqam Ibrahim =

Stone in the Great Mosque of Mecca

Coordinates: 21.42262°N 39.82633°E

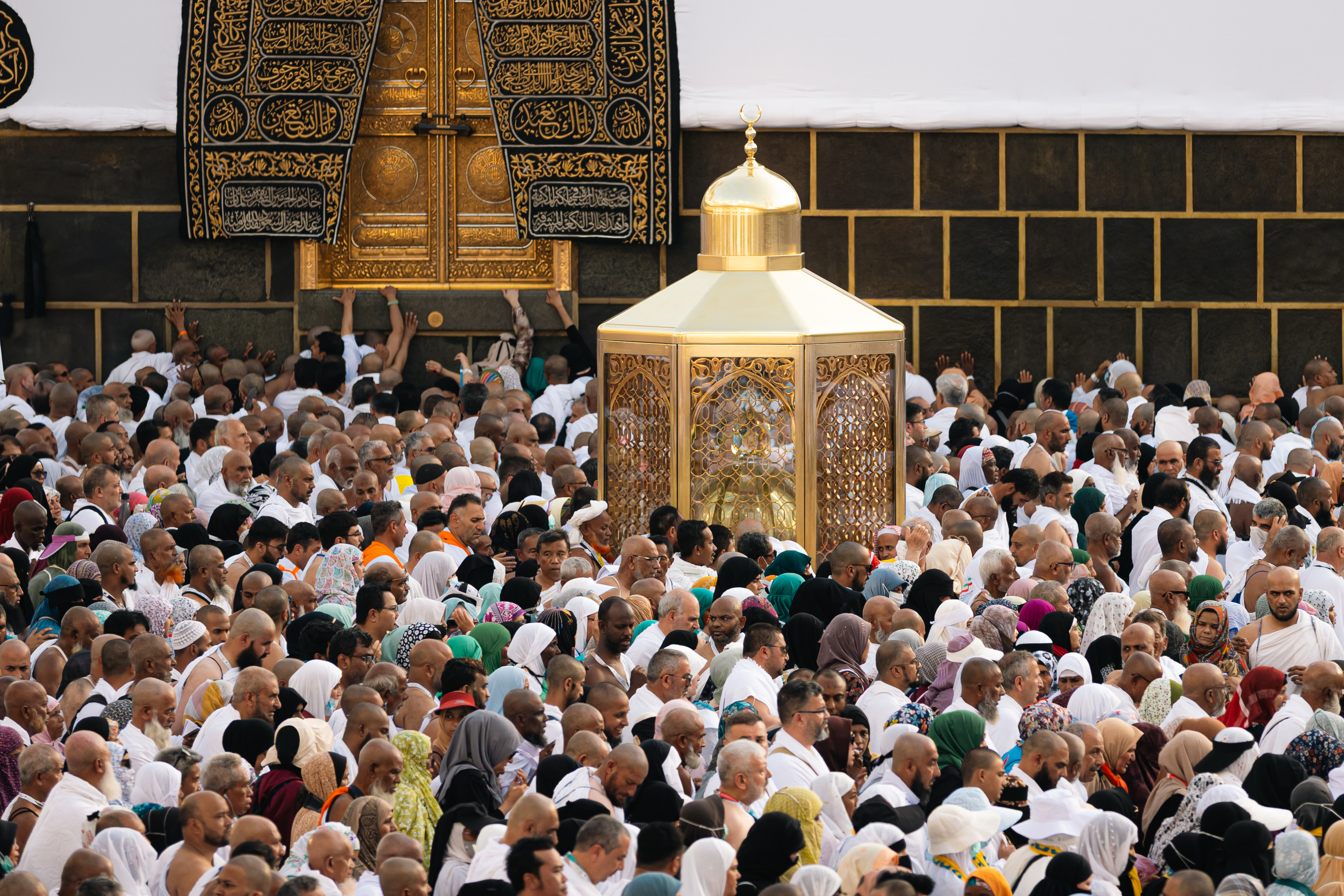
The structure containing the Maqām

The Maqām Ibrāhīm (Arabic: مَقَام إِبْرَاهِيْم, lit. 'Station of Abraham') is a small square stone associated with Abraham, Ishmael and their building of the Kaaba in what is now the Great Mosque of Mecca in the Hejaz region of Saudi Arabia. According to Islam, the imprint on the stone came from Abraham's feet. It is the only standing historic structure in the Mataf area out of at least six others, which were removed to clear the area for the circumambulation (tawaf).

== Formation ==
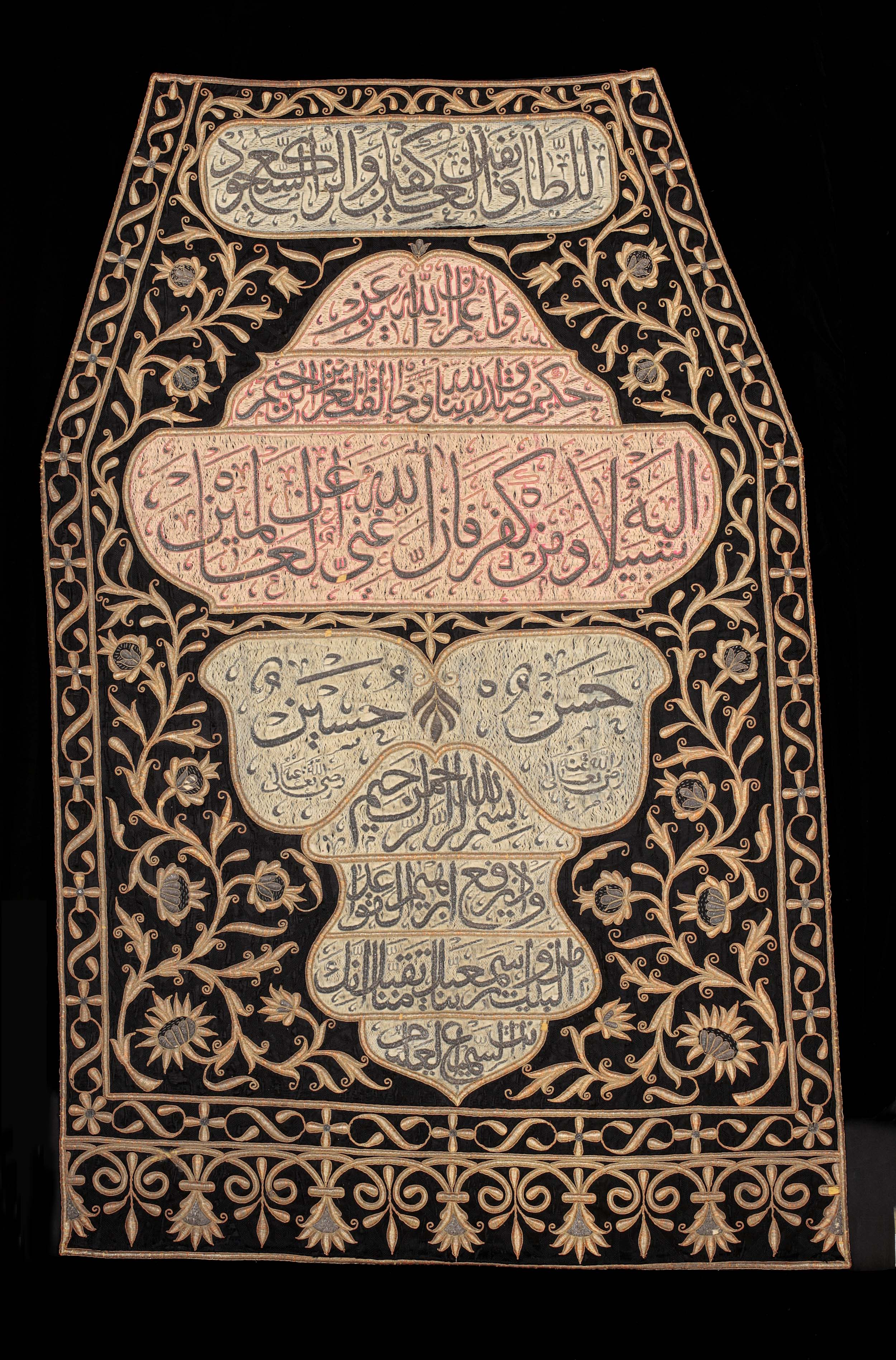
Textile covering for the Maqam Ibrahim, late 19th century, made at the Dar al-Kiswa in Cairo

According to one tradition, it appeared when Ibrahim stood on the stone while building the Kaaba; when the walls became too high, Ibrahim stood on the maqām, which miraculously rose up to let him resume building and also miraculously went down in order to allow Ismail to hand him stones. Other traditions held that the footprint appeared when the wife of Ismail washed Ibrahim's head, or alternatively when Ibrahim stood atop it in order to summon the people to perform the pilgrimage to Mecca.

== The stone ==
The stone inside the casing is square shaped and measures 40 cm (16 in) in length and width, and 20 cm (7.9 in) in height. It used to be enclosed by a structure called the Maqsurat Ibrahim which was covered by a sitara: an ornamental, embroidered curtain that was replaced annually. Currently, it is placed inside a golden-metal enclosure. The outer casing has changed a number of times over the years; historic photographs show that the arch of the Banu Shaybah Gate stood next to it.

== See also ==
- List of individual rocks
- Arabian Peninsula
- Holiest sites in Islam
- Kaaba
- Zamzam Well
