= Dar al-Kiswa =

Artistic workshop in Cairo

Dar al-Kiswa al-Sharifa
- Named after: Kiswah
- Established: 1817; 209 years ago
- Founder: Muhammad Ali of Egypt
- Dissolved: 1997; 29 years ago
- Type: Manufactory
- Location: Cairo, Egypt
- Coordinates: 30.05°N 31.26°E
- Parent organization: Ministry of Awqaf (Egypt)
- Formerly called: Warshat al-Khoronfesh, Maslahat al-Kiswa al-Sharifa

The Dar al-Kiswa al-Sharifa ("House of the noble Kiswah"), abbreviated Dar al-Kiswa, was an artistic workshop in Cairo, Egypt, which operated from 1817 to 1997. For more than a century, it made sacred textiles for the Islamic holy sites in Mecca and Medina including the kiswah, the ornamental textile covering of the Kaaba which is replaced annually. The kiswah and other sacred textiles were conveyed each year across the hundreds of miles of desert from Cairo to Mecca on camels among the Hajj pilgrims. The workshop also made textiles for royal and state purposes, including military and police uniforms. At its peak at the start of the 20th century, the workshop employed over a hundred craftsmen to make textiles for the holy sites. Egypt sent the kiswah every year with few exceptions until 1962, when the kiswah sent to Mecca was returned unused. From then on, the textiles were made in a dedicated factory in Mecca. The building is now a government storage space.

== Background ==
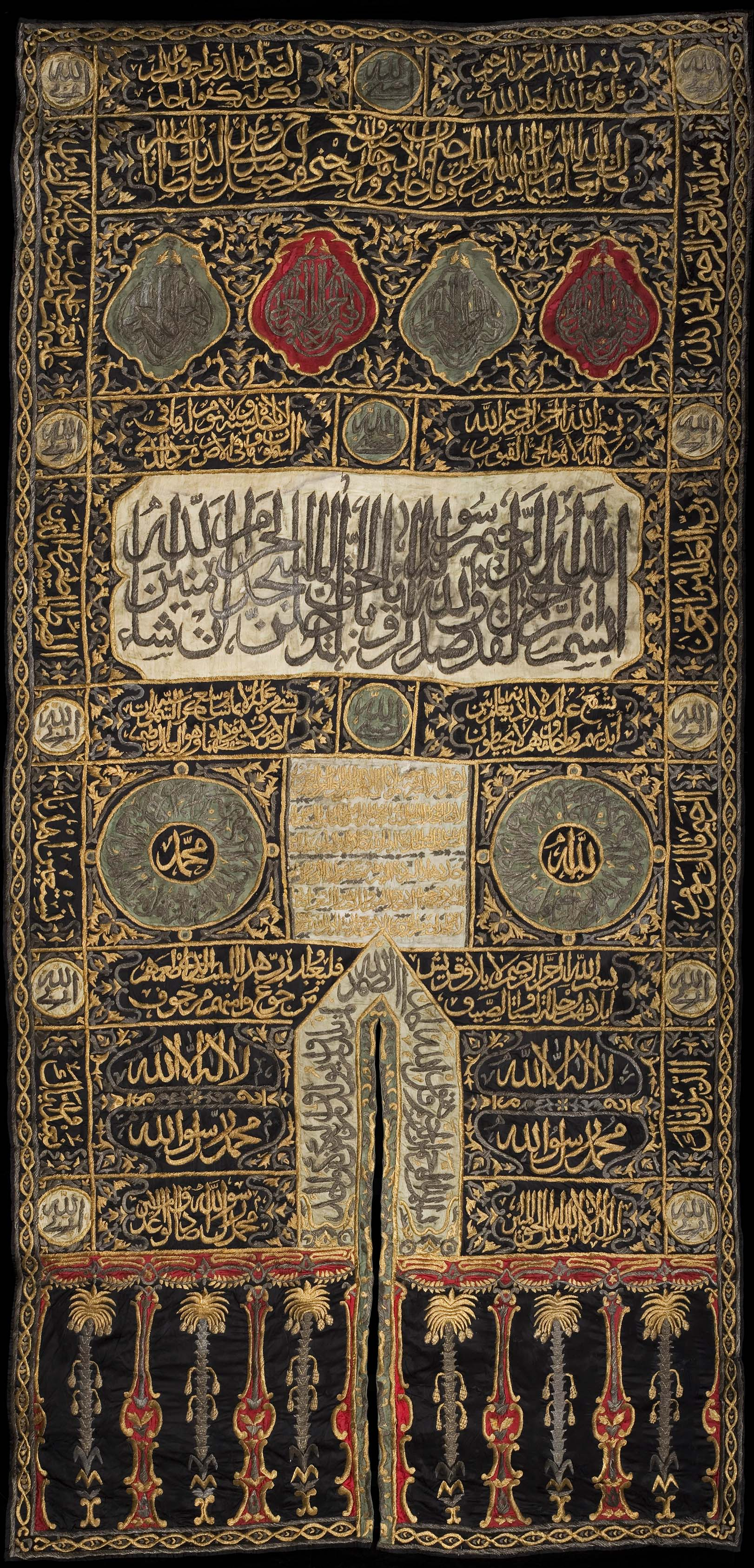
Sitara for the door of the Kaaba commissioned by Abdulmejid I 1272 AH (1855–6 AD)

There was a long tradition, from the beginning of Islam, of decorating the Kaaba with cloth from Egypt. For 750 AH (1349–50 AD) onwards, an endowment created by the Mamluk sultan As-Salih Ismail set aside the revenue of three Egyptian villages to fund a new covering of the Kaaba each year, and coverings for the Prophet's tomb and for the minbar (pulpit) of the Prophet's mosque, which were replaced every five years. In 1540, the Ottoman sultan Suleiman the Magnificent added seven more villages to the arrangement. The manufacture was done at various places in Egypt over the centuries until the establishment of a dedicated workshop.

== History ==
The workshop is located on the al-Khoronfesh street in the al-Gamaleya neighborhood of Cairo. It was founded in 1817 by Muhammad Ali Pasha, Egypt's Ottoman governor. Originally it was the Warshat al-Khoronfesh, a large complex employing around 4,000 craftsmen to make many kinds of textiles. The governor cancelled the existing endowment which drew funds from ten villages; from then on, the sacred textiles were funded directly from the Egyptian Treasury. By the 1880s, most of the complex had fallen in to disuse. The remaining part had been taken over by the government and dedicated to the production of textiles for the holy sites. It was then known as the Maslahat al-Kiswa al-Sharifa ("Department of the noble Kiswah"). In 1953 the workshop became part of the Egyptian Ministry of Endowments and its name changed to Dar al-Kiswa al-Sharifa ("House of the noble Kiswah").

== Output ==
=== Sacred textiles of Islam ===
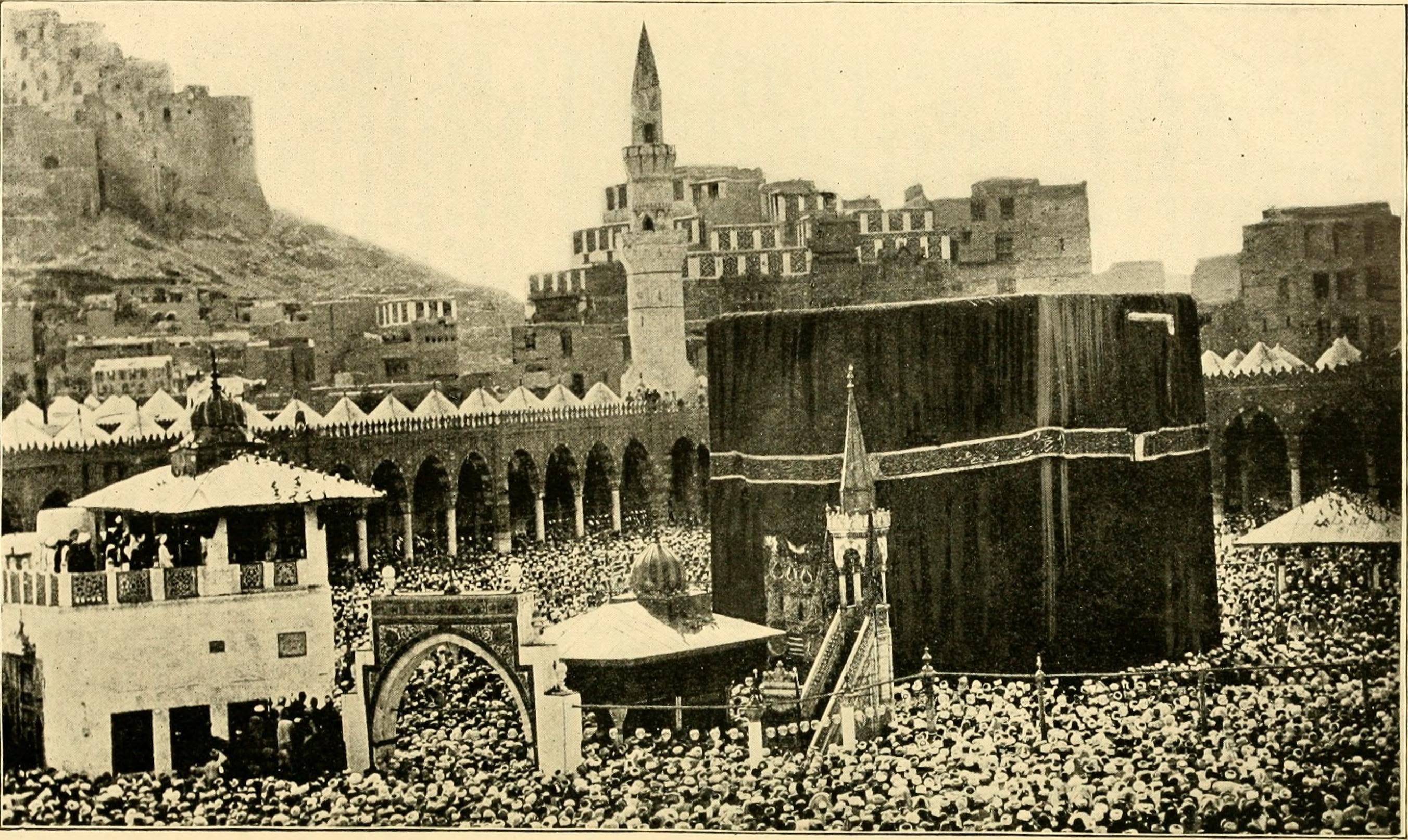
The Kaaba in 1897 with its distinctive textile covering including the hizam (belt) and sitara (curtain for the door)

The Kaaba is the most sacred site in Islam. Its distinctive covering is assembled from various textile pieces, which are among the most sacred objects in Islamic art. The kiswah is the overall covering and the hizam is a belt circling it, about two thirds of the way up. The curtain over the door of the Kaaba is the sitara, also known as the burqu'. The basic designs of the hizam and sitara changed infrequently from the 16th century to the present, although the colour schemes and embroidery details are changed from year to year so that no two sitaras are alike. The inscriptions are calligraphed on paper then embroidered in gold and silver wire. These include verses from the Quran and supplications to Allah, as well as the names of the rulers who commissioned the textiles. At an average of 5.75 metres (18.9 ft) by 3.5 metres (11 ft), the sitara is assembled by sewing together four separate textile panels. The hizam is similarly assembled from eight panels (two for each wall of the Kaaba).

The other sacred textiles include sitaras for the minbar of the Prophet's Mosque and for the internal door of the Kaaba, as well as the silk bag for the key of the Kaaba. The Maqam Ibrahim (Station of Abraham) is a small square stone near the Kaaba which, according to Islamic tradition, bears the footprint of Abraham. It used to be housed in a structure called the Maqsurat Ibrahim. A covering for the Maqam Ibrahim and a sitara for the Maqsurat Ibrahim were among the textiles regularly replaced by the Dar al-Kiswa until 1940.

Construction of these textiles required nearly a thousand metres of silk, along with gilded silver wire, white silver wire, cotton, and linen. There were strict procedures in place to keep track of the valuable silver wire, including weighing the input materials and finished textiles. Along with the textiles, the Dar al-Kiswa sent ropes for attaching the kiswah to the Kaaba and spare silk in case the kiswah needed repair. The textiles for the Kaaba were sent to Mecca on camels along with the annual Hajj pilgrim caravan. Part of the Dar al-Kiswa building was set aside as stables for the camels. Before the trip across the desert, the camel that would carry the kiswah was paraded in Cairo, dressed in colourful fabrics. Up to 1953, the pilgrim caravan from Cairo to Mecca included the mahmal, a ceremonial passenger-less litter. The elaborate fabric covering for the mahmal was also the responsibility of the Dar al-Kiswa.

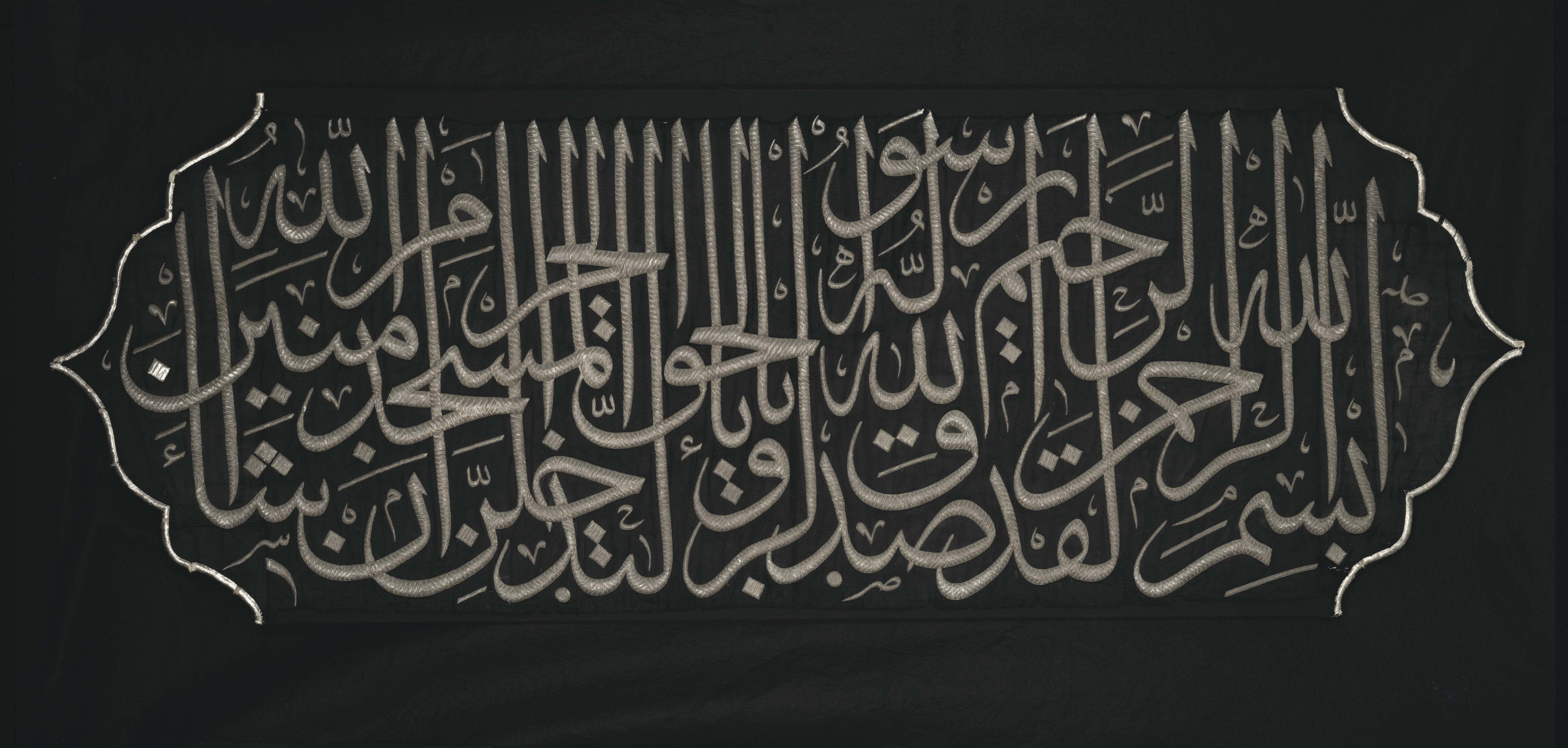
Panel from the sitara for the door of the Kaaba, 19th century

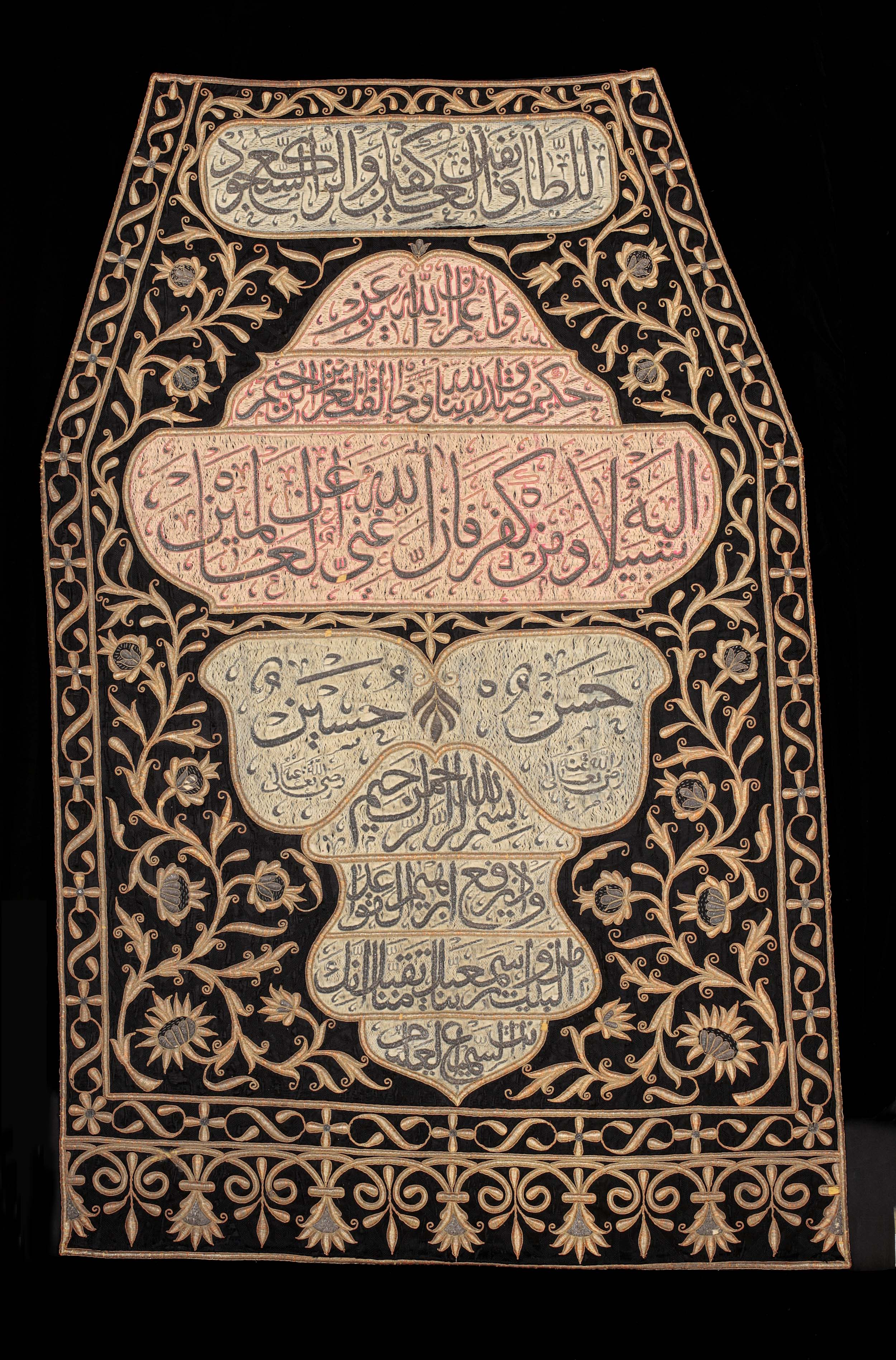
Section from the kiswah of the Maqam Ibrahim, late 19th century

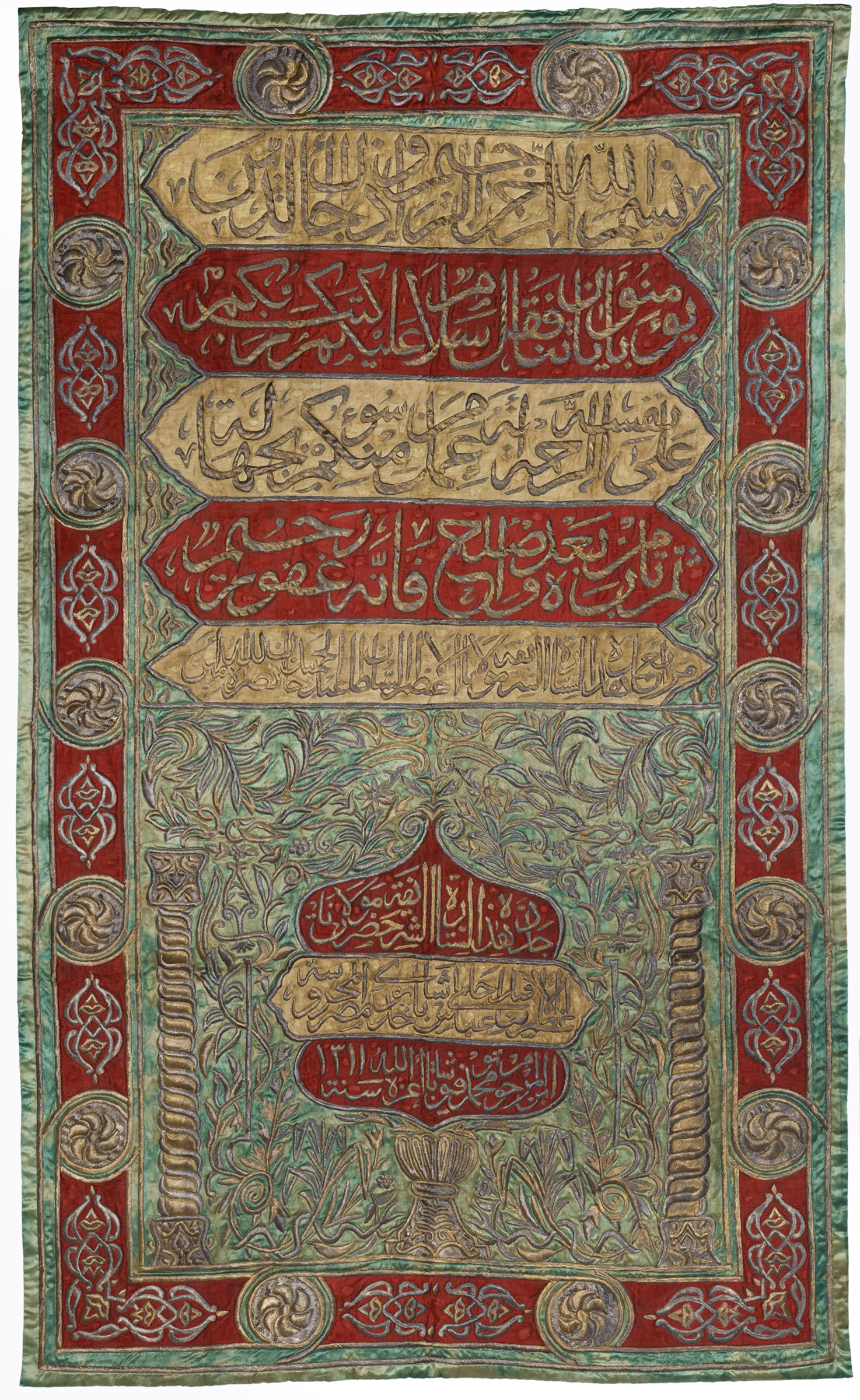
Curtain for the Internal Door of the Kaaba (the Bab al-Tawba) dated 1311 AH (1893–4 AD)

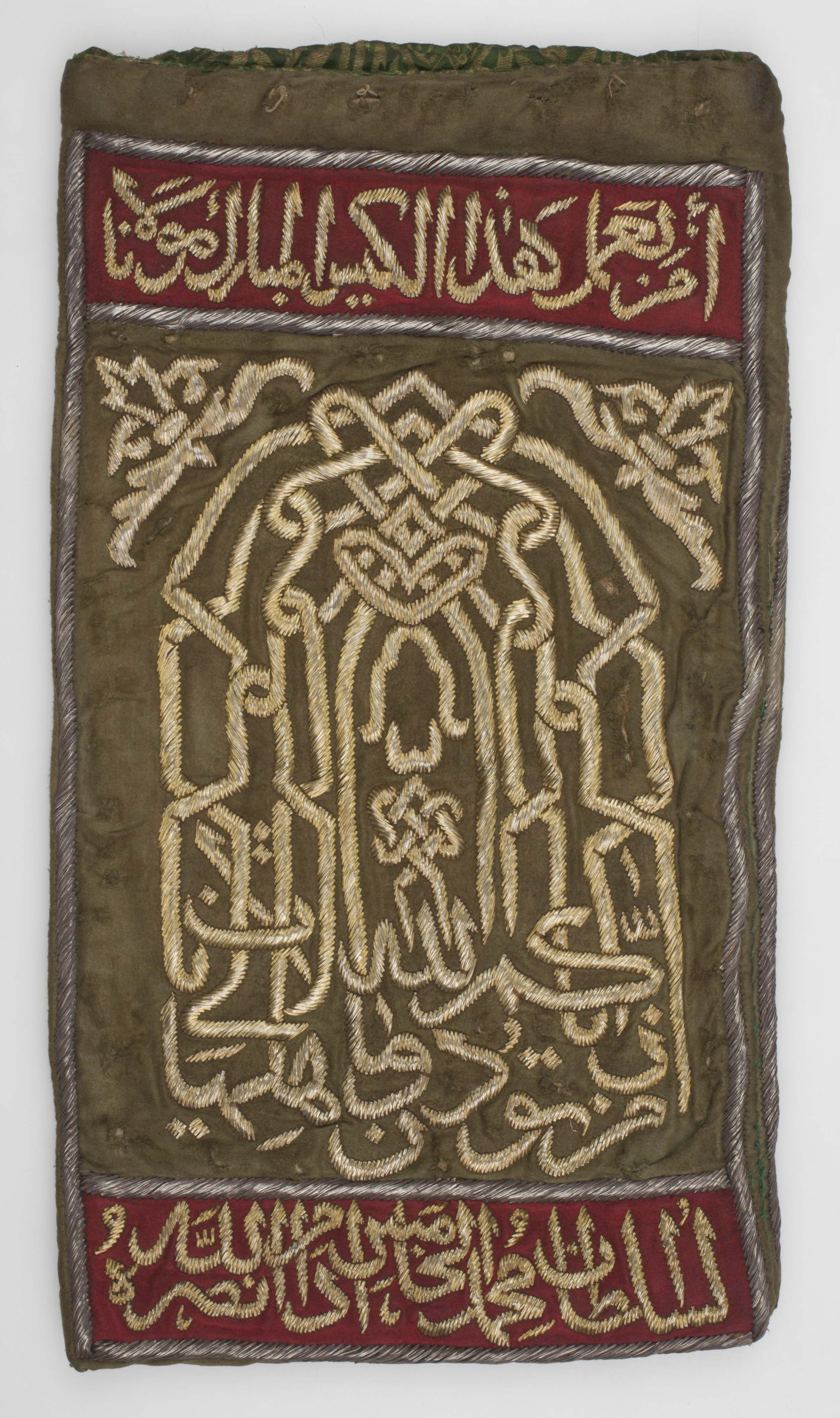
Bag for the key of the Kaaba, 1327 AH (1909–10 AD)

=== Other textiles ===
The workshop also produced marks of rank for the army and police as well as robes and uniforms signifying the ranks of Bey and Pasha. The embroiderers made various special textiles for royal clients, including a dress for Queen Nazli of Egypt and a door curtain for a daughter of the sultan of Brunei. They also embroidered covers for the tombs of saints.

== Workers ==
At the start of the 20th century, the workshop employed more than a hundred craftsmen, including 47 embroiderers. The workers' contract required them to work six days per week, excluding public and religious holidays. Their work was defined by strict plans and timescales, and they could be denied pay for deviating. The workers included accomplished calligraphers such as 'Abdullah Zuhdi, who had designed inscriptions for the Kaaba and for the Prophet's Mosque; Mustafa Al-Hariri, a pupil of Zuhdi's; and Mustafa Ghazlan, calligrapher to King Fuad I. The workshop was organised into sections, each with its own head, responsible for spinning and dyeing yarn, weaving the yarn, spinning and gilding silver wire, and embroidery. The director of the entire workshop was known as the Ma'mur al-Kiswa al-Sharifa.

Interviewed in 2021, the grandson of a former director described how craftsmen in the 1920s prepared themselves with spiritual rituals before working on the kiswah.

They would divide themselves in two groups sitting opposite to each other and perform ablution, then rinse their hands with rose water, recite the Qur’anic chapter of Fatiha and start their work that took one year to be finished.

== Awards ==
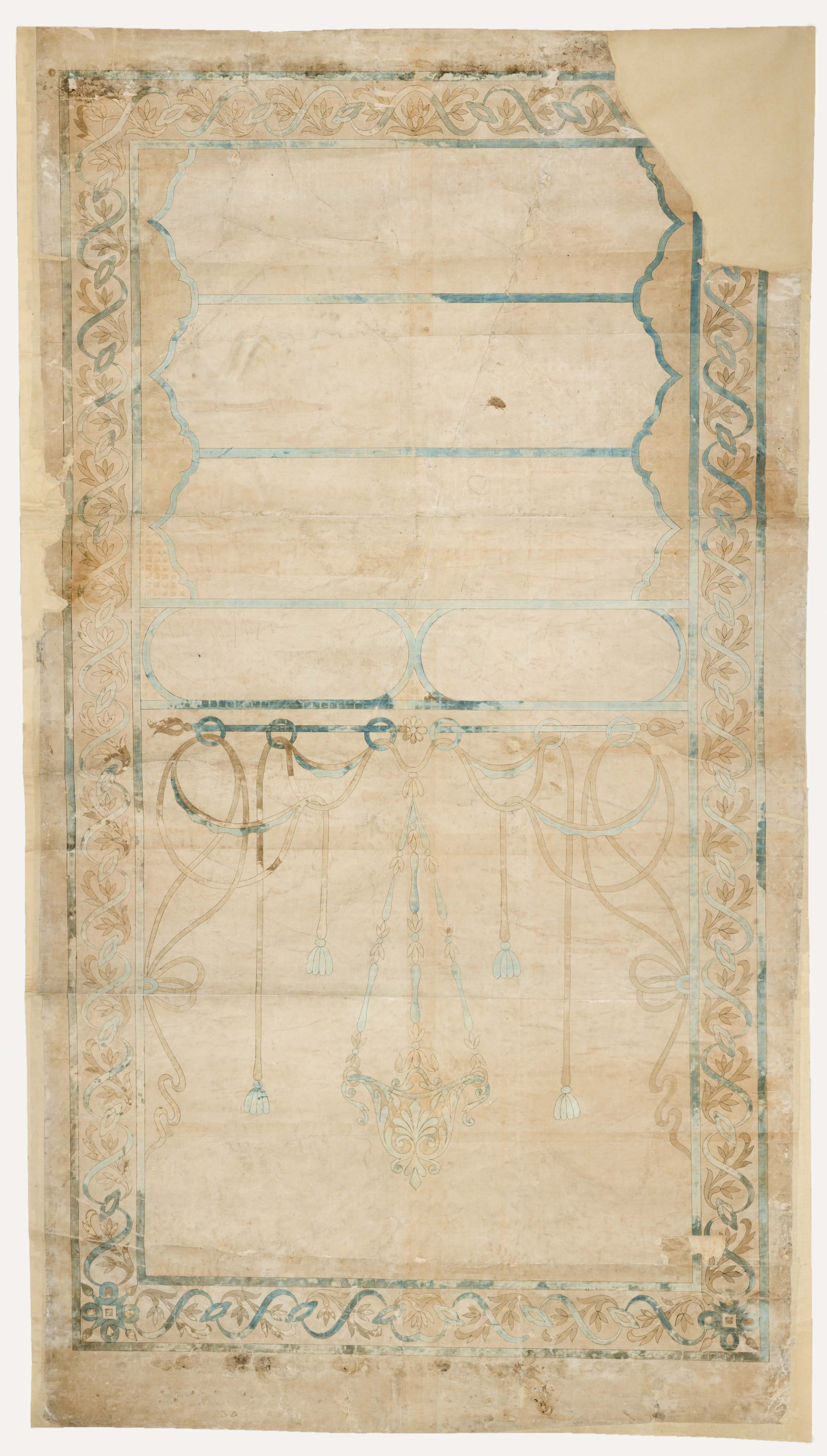
Paper template for the curtain of the minbar of the Holy Sanctuary at Mecca

The workshop sent examples of its work to national and international exhibitions, winning awards. At the Agricultural and Industrial Exhibition held in Cairo in 1926, it won a gold medal and certificate of merit, eventually winning first prize in the 1931 exhibition. It won a Diplôme de Médaille d'Or ("diploma for a gold medal") at both the Exposition of 1930 in Liège and the 1937 Exposition Internationale des Arts et Techniques dans la Vie Moderne in Paris.

== Decline and legacy ==
In the 1920s, King Abd Al-Aziz (Ibn Saud) opened a textile factory in Mecca, the Kiswa Factory of the Holy Kaaba; in 1927, a kiswah produced directly in Saudi Arabia was used for the first time. For the ten-year period until 1936, the kiswah was produced in Mecca rather than Cairo. In 1962, due to political tensions between Egypt (then called the United Arab Republic) and Saudi Arabia, the Saudi authorities rejected a kiswah from the Dar al-Kiswa, sending it back to Egypt. Since the end of the relationship in 1962, the Mecca factory has been where the sacred textiles are produced, using a combination of traditional crafts and modern digital technology. Over the following decades, the Dar al-Kiswa concentrated on decorative panels for other mosques. The workforce aged and were not replaced, so staff numbers dwindled to a handful. The Dar al-Kiswa officially closed in 1997; the building which housed it is now a storage space for the Egyptian Ministry of Endowments and, as of 2017, has fallen into disrepair.

The Khalili Collection of Hajj and the Arts of Pilgrimage includes some of the textiles produced by the workshop as well as materials used in their production and archival documents. These materials include paper stencils used as templates for the embroidery, tools, and coils of silver wire.
