= Anis Al-Hujjaj =

17th-century literary work by Safi ibn Vali

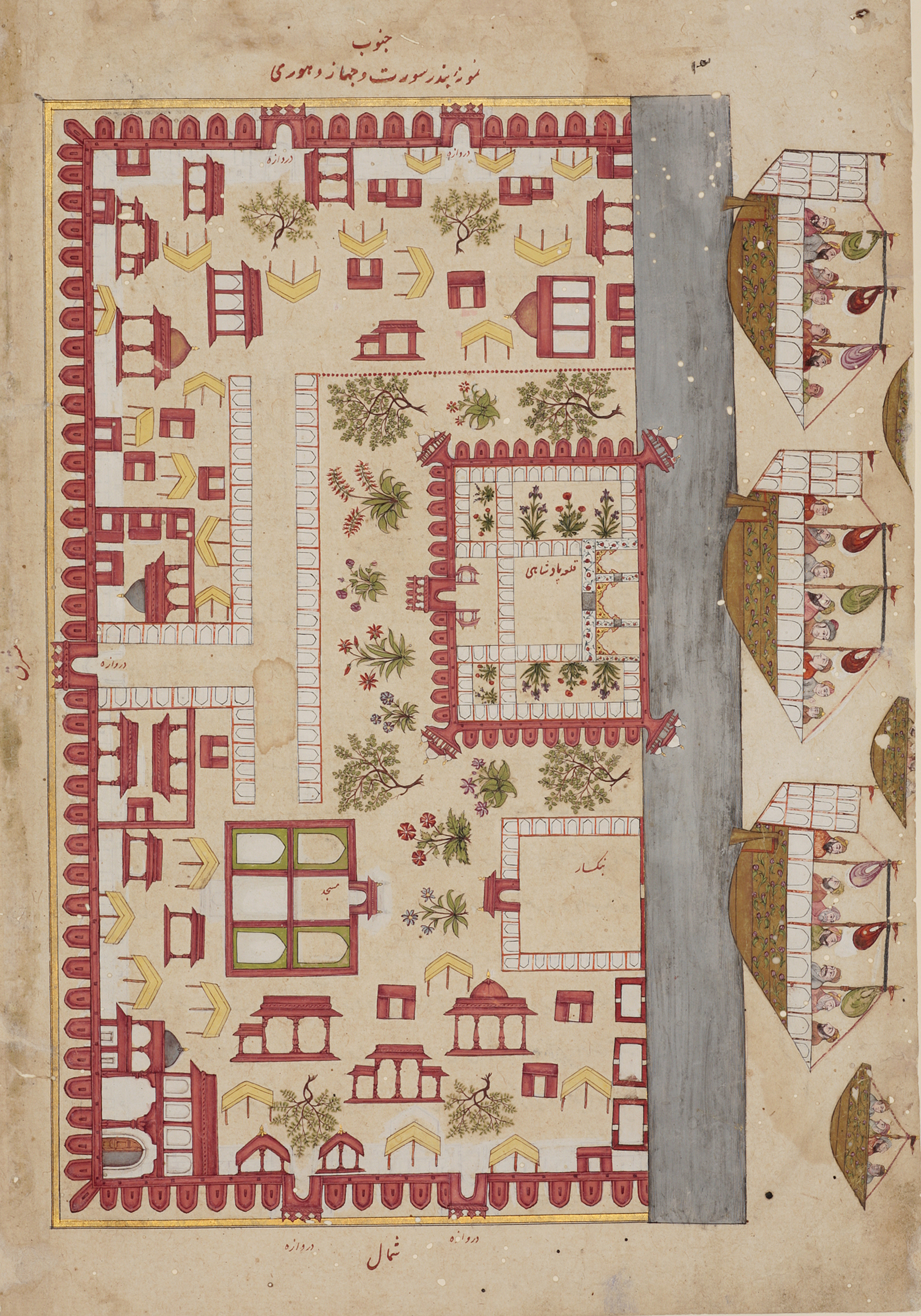
Illustration from the Anis Al-Hujjaj showing the port of Surat, Khalili Collection of Hajj and the Arts of Pilgrimage

The Anis Al-Hujjaj (Pilgrim's Companion, also transcribed Anis ul-Hujjaj) is a seventeenth-century literary work by Safi ibn Vali, an official of the Mughal court in what is now India. Written in Persian, it describes the Hajj (the pillar of Islam which is the pilgrimage to Mecca and Medina) undertaken by him in 1677 AD (AH 1088) and it gives advice to pilgrims. Its illustrations depict pilgrims travelling to the holy sites and taking part in the rituals of the Hajj. They are also a visual guide to significant places and people. An English translation was published in 2026.

== Summary ==
Ibn Vali was an official in the court of the Mughal emperor Aurangzeb. His Hajj was financially supported by Zeb-un-Nissa, eldest child of Aurangzeb, after ibn Vali wrote for her a commentary on the Quran. He had also, in 1665, written a universal history. After his Hajj, he returned to his job in the court and continued his scholarship into old age.

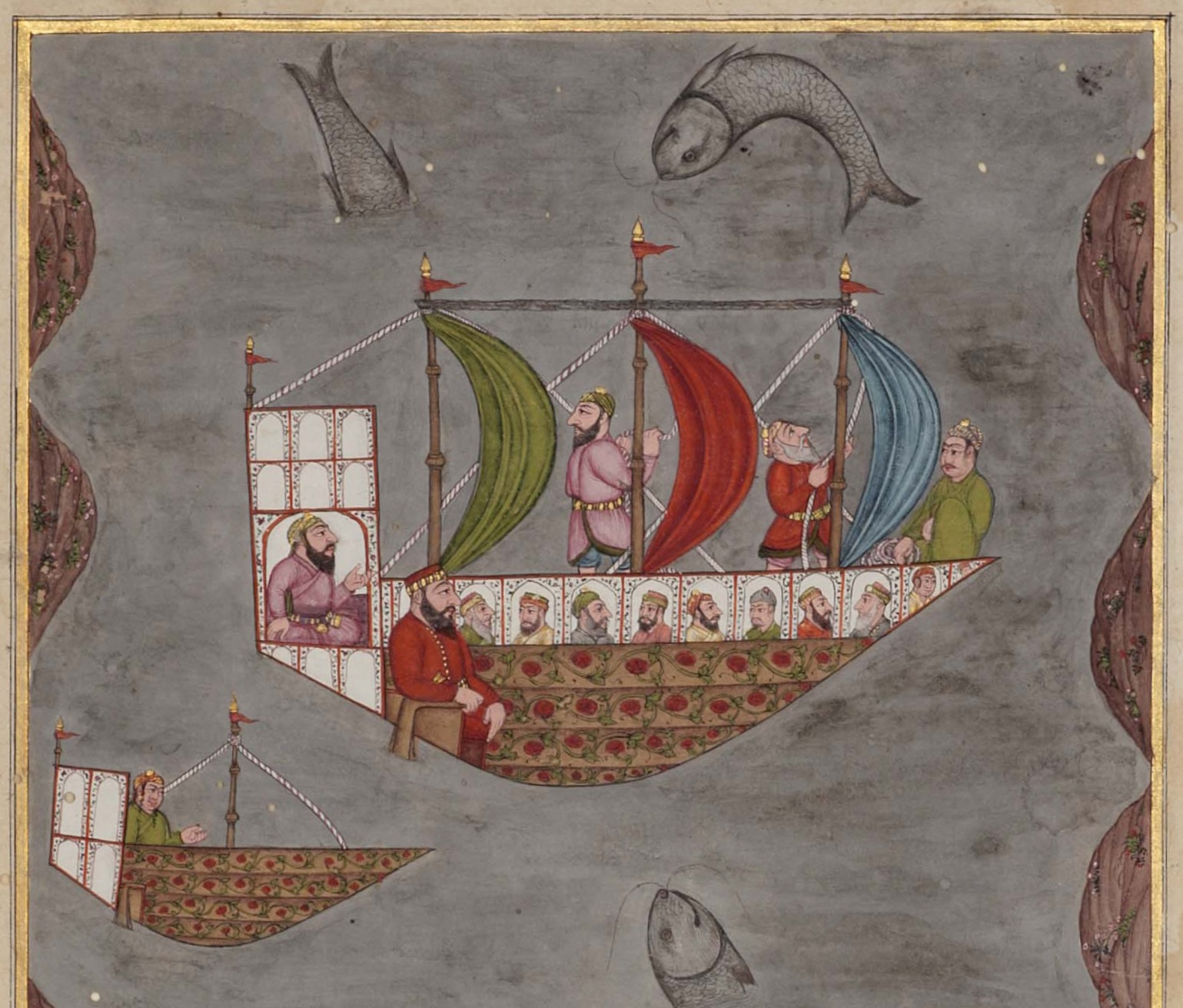
Pilgrims travelling in a ship across the Sea of Oman

Ibn Vali set out from Delhi in September 1676, reaching the port of Mocha, Yemen in January 1677 and continuing with a caravan of other pilgrims. The sea journey from India to the Arabian Peninsula would have taken about 25 days. The book has advice about travelling on ships across the Indian Ocean, starting with advice on choosing a ship. It recommends that each ship should have a tabib (physician) and a blood-letter. Pilgrims are advised to carry their own water in earthen pots, as the water available on ship tasted unpleasant. If they did not have their own water, they could make the ship's water palatable by adding pomegranate syrup or the juice of soured fruit. The book recommends that travellers should stay close to the main mast and away from the outer side of the deck, in order to avoid sea-sickness. It describes in detail the places visited by ibn Vali and the rituals of the Hajj. These included visits to holy places where the pilgrims shaved their hair, made sacrifices, and performed the stoning of the Devil.

== Surviving exemplars ==
There are manuscripts of the Anis in the Khalili Collection of Hajj and the Arts of Pilgrimage, in the Royal Armoury in Lucknow, and in the Chhatrapati Shivaji Maharaj Vastu Sangrahalaya in Mumbai.

== Illustrations ==
While there are other pilgrims' guides that illustrate the pilgrimage and its locations diagrammatically, the Anis Al-Hujjaj is distinctive for also including colourful depictions of the pilgrims themselves.

The Khalili exemplar (accession number MSS 1025), thought to originate from Gujarat between 1677 and 1680, consists of 23 folios including nine half-page and eleven full-page illustrations. The text is in nastaliq script, with 23 lines per page. The Khalili manuscript includes labelled depictions of places including Surat, Mocha, Jeddah and Mina. The maps of these towns show buildings which are still identifiable today. The illustrations also depict shrines around Mecca, some of which no longer exist. These include birthplaces of Muhammad, of his daughter Fatimah, and of his companion Abu Bakr al Siddiq. The convention for maps in the Anis is that the top of the page represents the direction in which pilgrims are travelling.

The illustrations show ships carrying pilgrims from the port of Surat on the Indian subcontinent, crossing the Sea of Oman, and arriving at Jeddah on the Arabian Peninsula. At Jeddah, smaller boats are shown which would have conveyed passengers between the large ships and the port. Another folio of the Khalili manuscript shows a pilgrim caravan, including its amir al-hajj ("commander of the pilgrimage"), named as Abdi Pasha, and ahead of him the mahmal, an empty litter carried on a camel with each pilgrim caravan from Egypt. Sources differ on whether anything was carried within the mahmal, with some sources saying it was kept empty, although in ibn Vali's illustration it contains a Quran on a stand. The illustrations also show the Sharif Barakat, ruler of the sanctuaries, meeting an emissary of the Ottoman sultan Mehmed IV. The pilgrims converging on Mecca included groups from North Africa, Egypt, Syria, Iran, India and the Arabian Desert; the Anis shows their camps. At Muzdalifah, pilgrims are shown collecting pebbles. Then at Mina they throw the pebbles in the ritual of ramy al-jamarāt (stoning of the Devil).

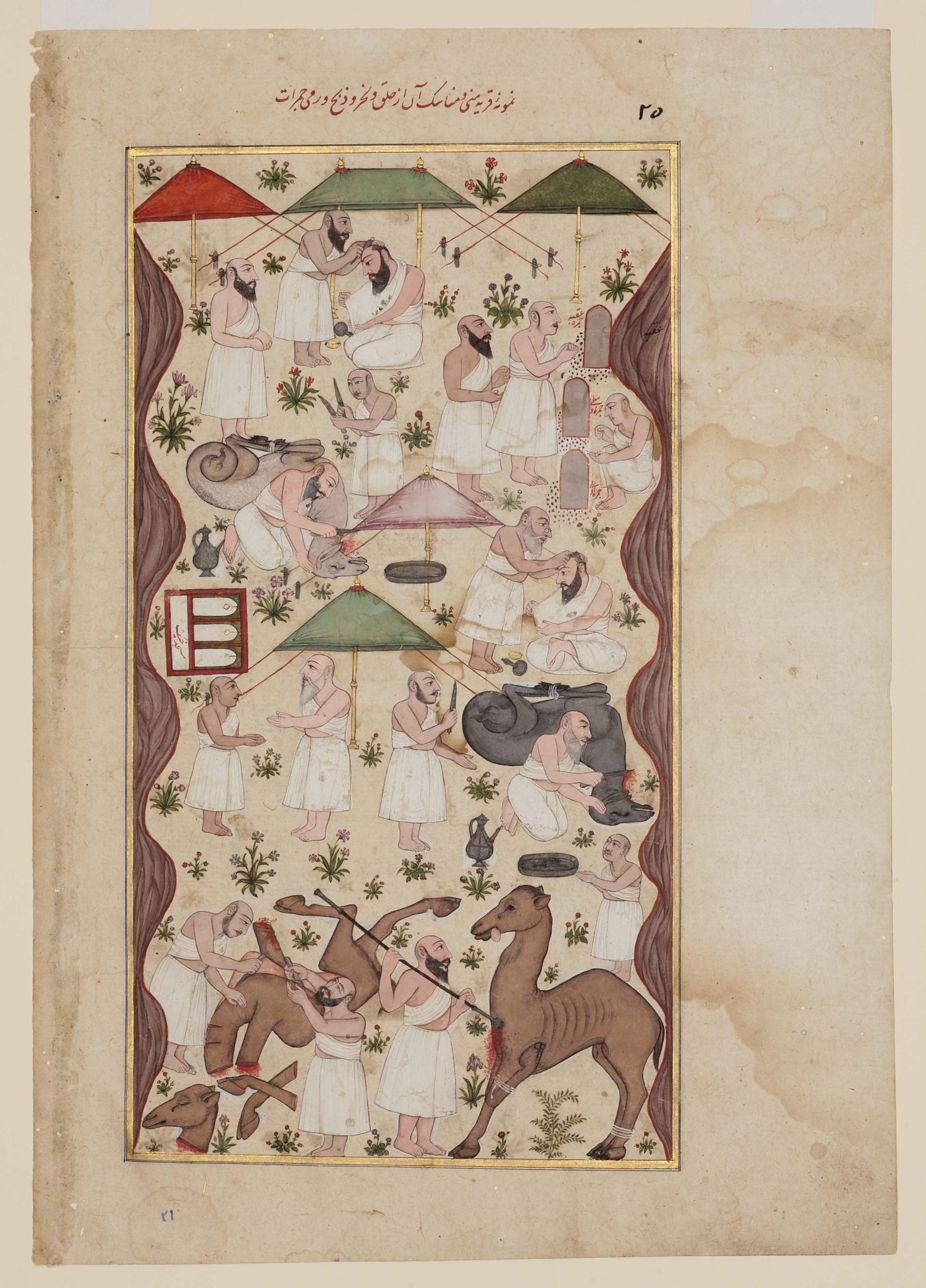
Pilgrims in Mina, being shaved, making sacrifices and stoning the Devil

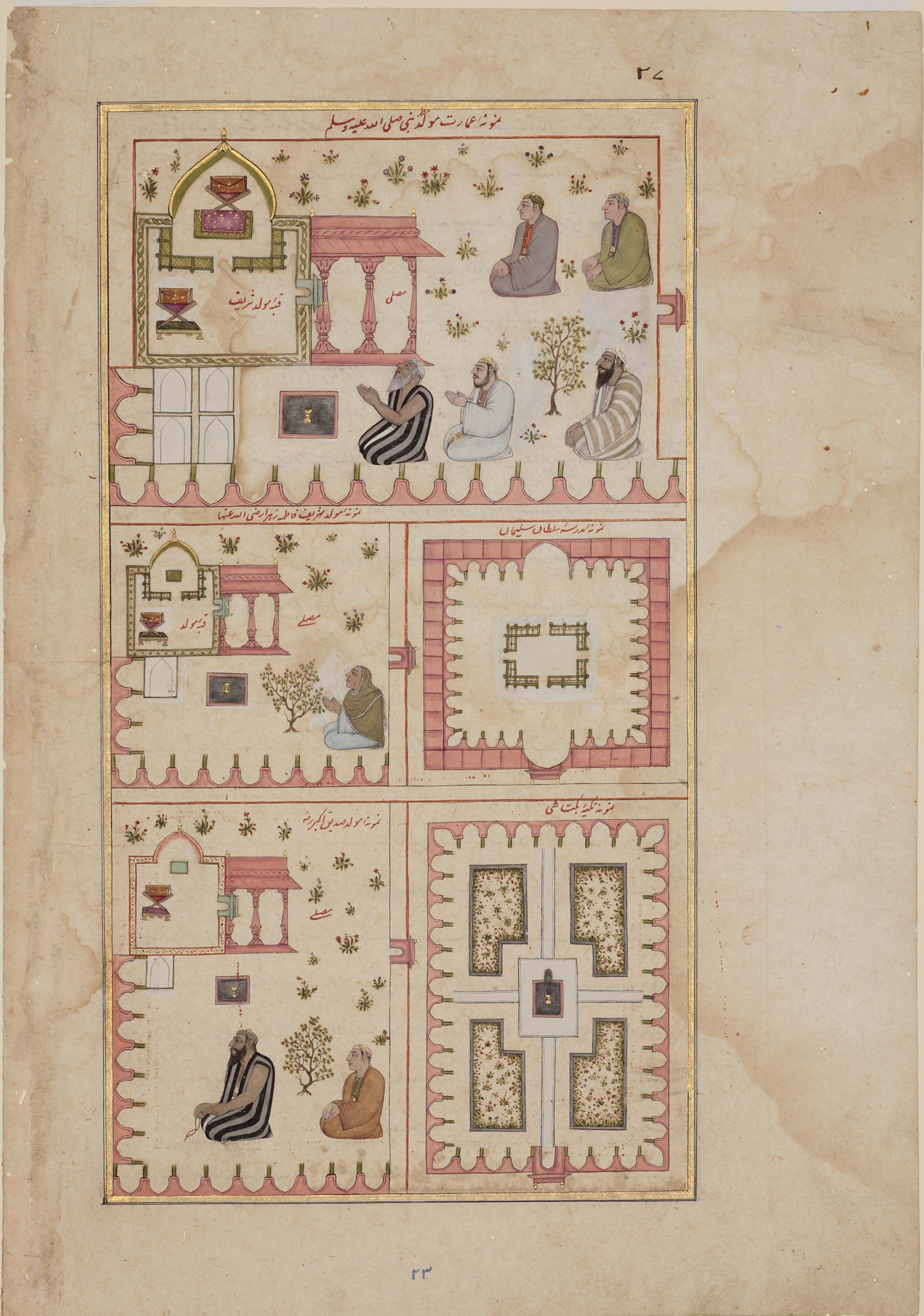
The birthplaces of the Prophet Muhammad; of Fatimah; of Abu Bak al-Siddiq; as well as the Madrasah of Suleiman the Magnificent, and a Bektashi lodge

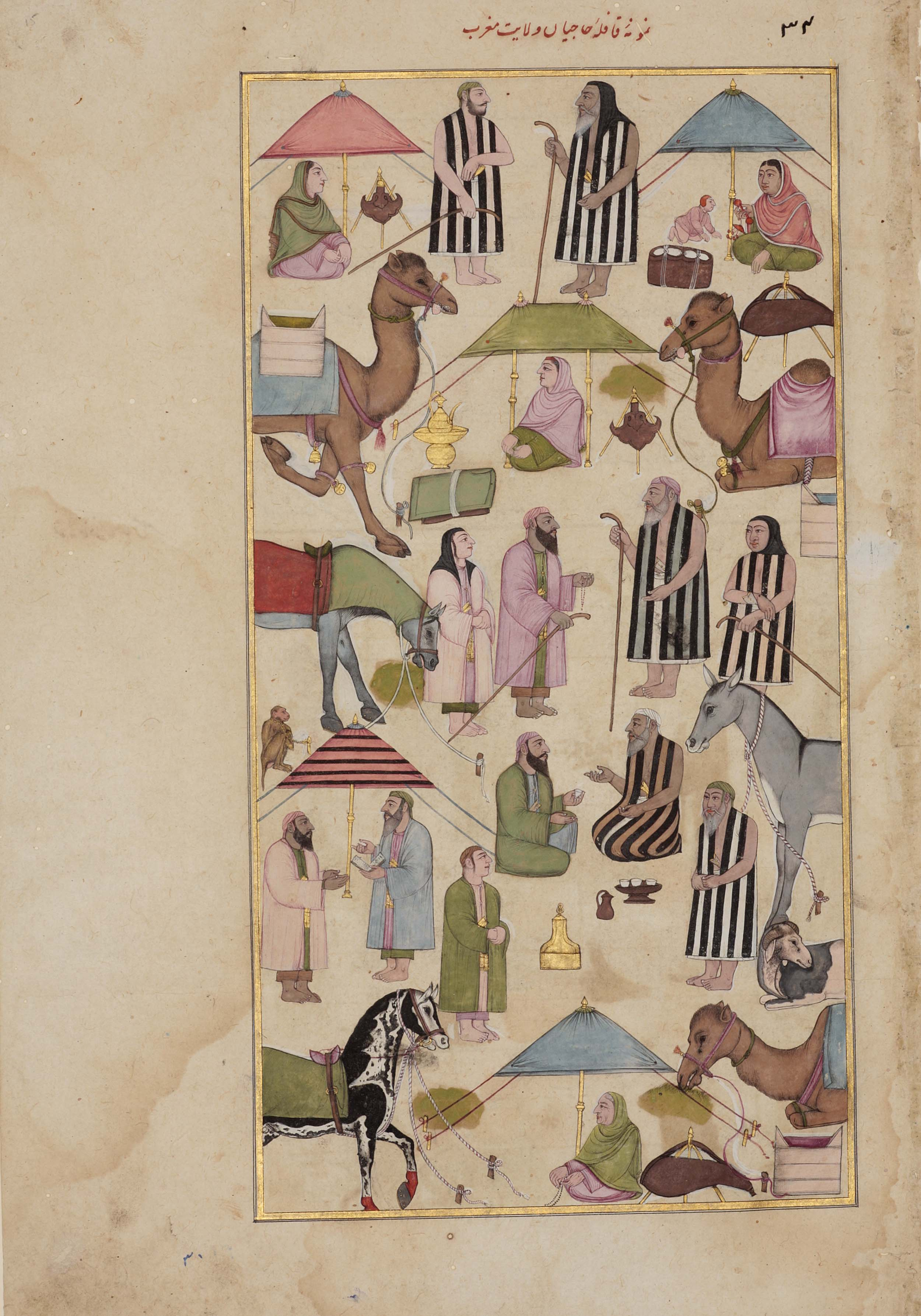
Camp of the North African pilgrim caravan

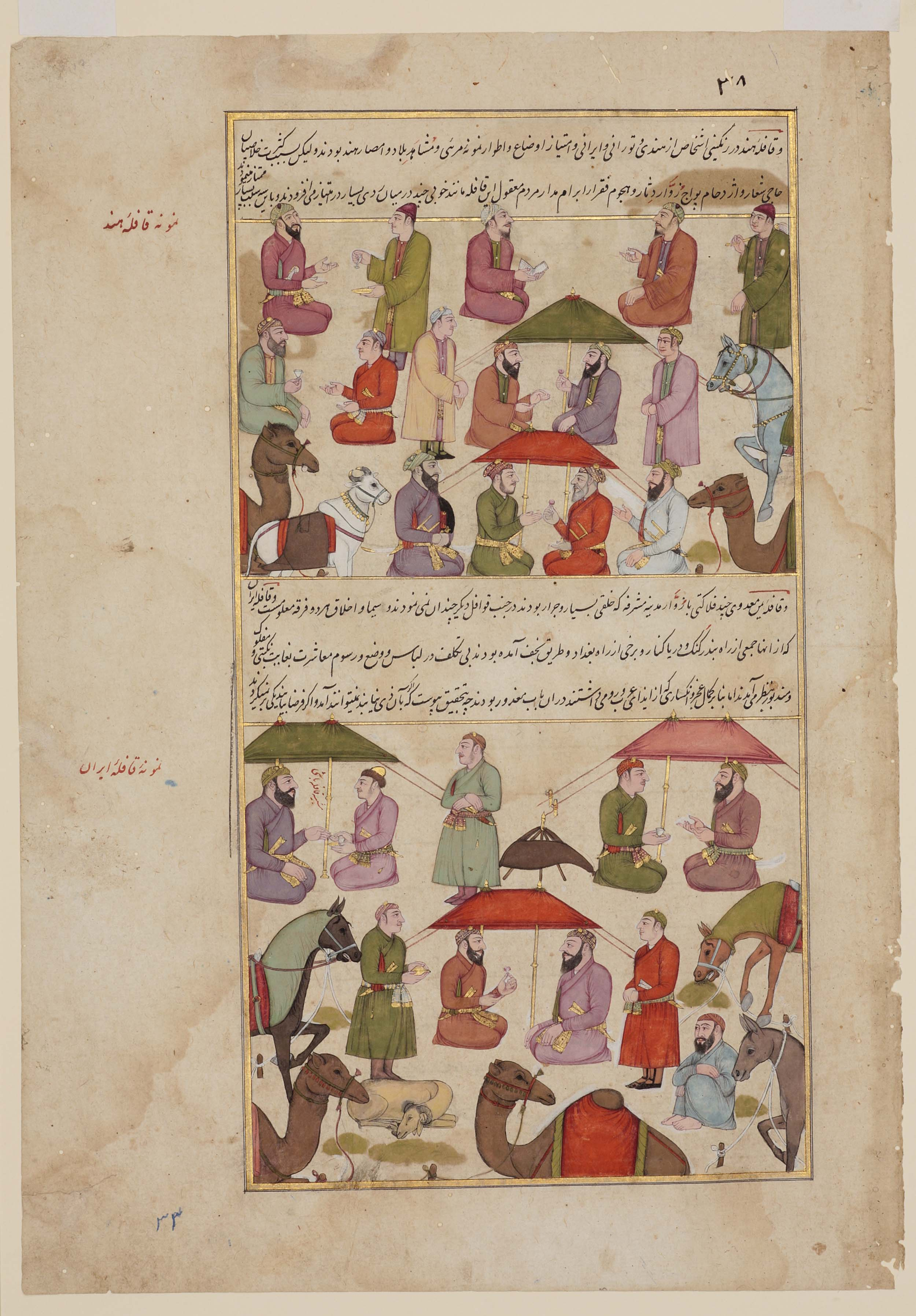
Camps of the Indian (top) and Iranian pilgrim caravans

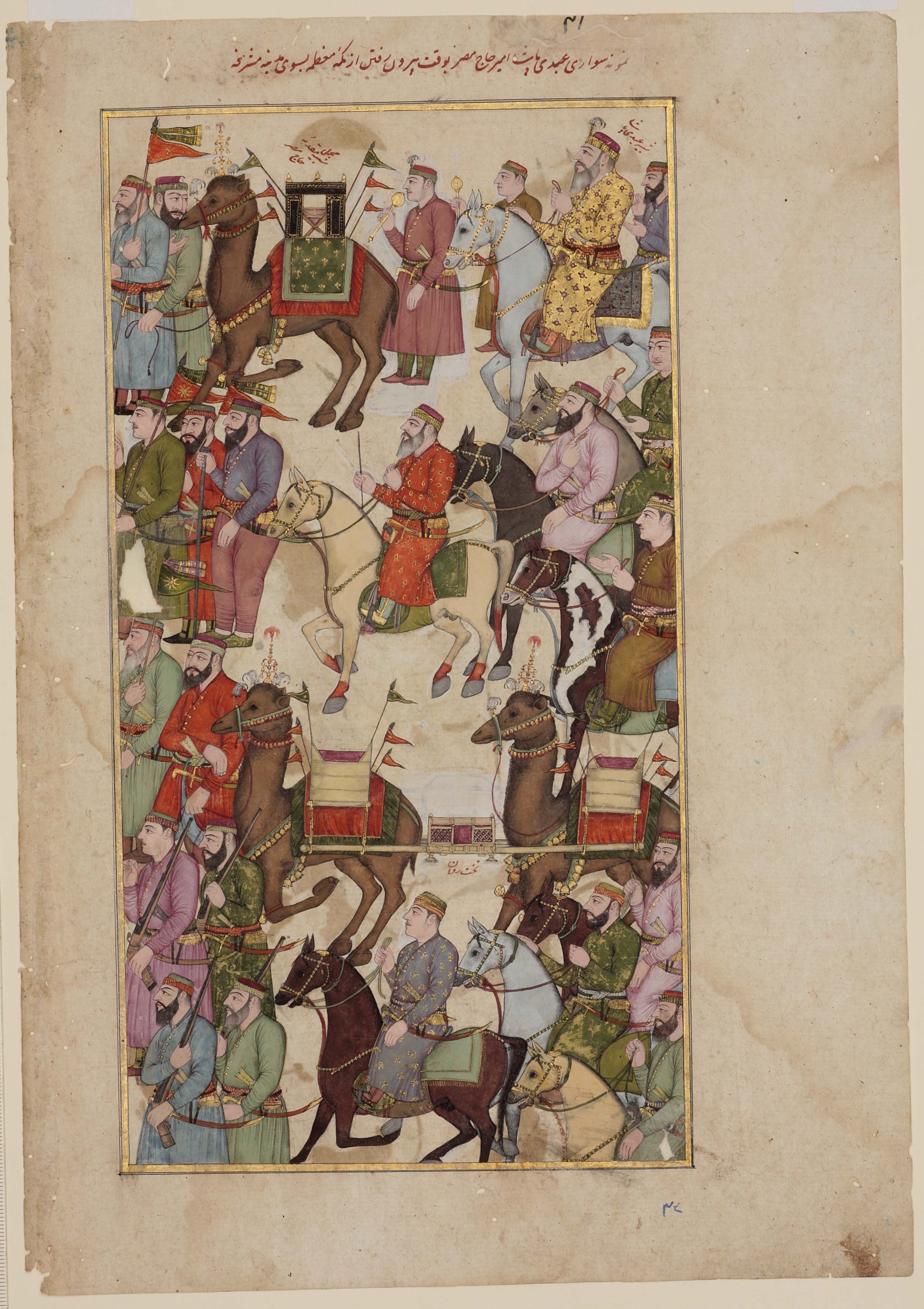
The Amir al-Hajj of the Egyptian caravan riding from Mecca to Medina with the mahmal

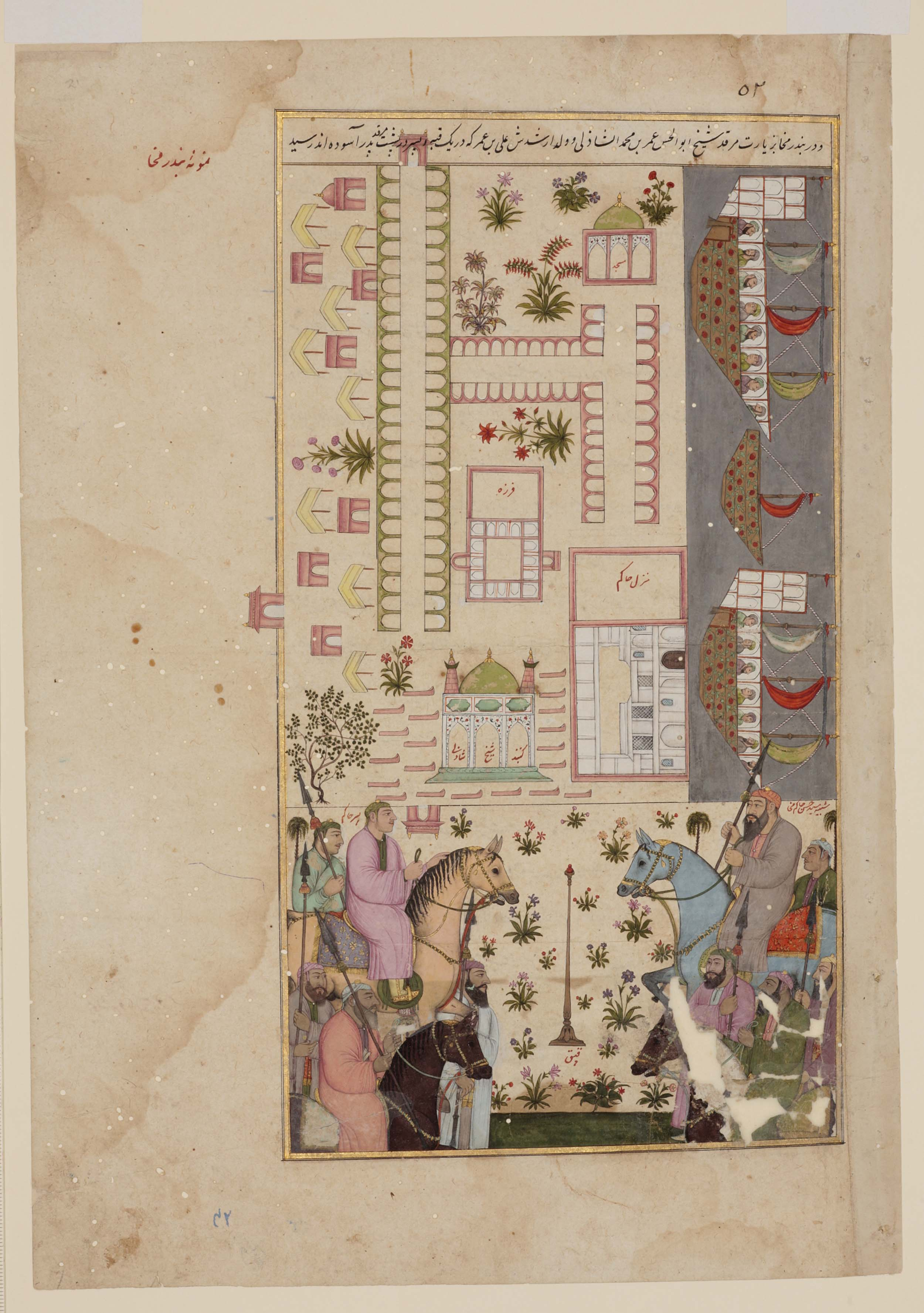
Pilgrim ships leaving the port of Mocha, Yemen for India

== See also ==
- Mughal painting
