= Muhammad Sadiq (photographer) =

Egyptian army engineer and surveyor

Muhammad Sadiq Bey
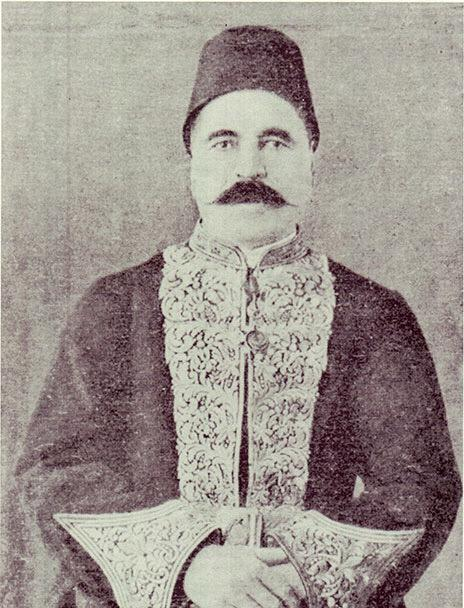
- Born: 1822 or 1832; Cairo, Egypt Eyalet, Ottoman Empire
- Died: 1902 (aged 79–80 or 69–70); Cairo, Khedivate of Egypt, Ottoman Empire
- Occupations: military surveyor, photographer, author

Muhammad Sadiq Bey (Note: His Arabic name is also transliterated as Sadiq, Sadic, Sadik, or Sadek.) (1822 or 1832 – 1902 (Note: Some sources give his birth date as 1832 and say he died at age 70; others give his birth as 1822. Library databases including the Library of Congress, National Library of Israel and German National Library mention both birth years.)) was an Ottoman Egyptian army engineer and surveyor who served as treasurer of the Hajj pilgrim caravan. As a photographer and author, he documented the holy sites of Islam at Mecca and Medina, taking the first ever photographs in what is now Saudi Arabia.

== Life and career ==
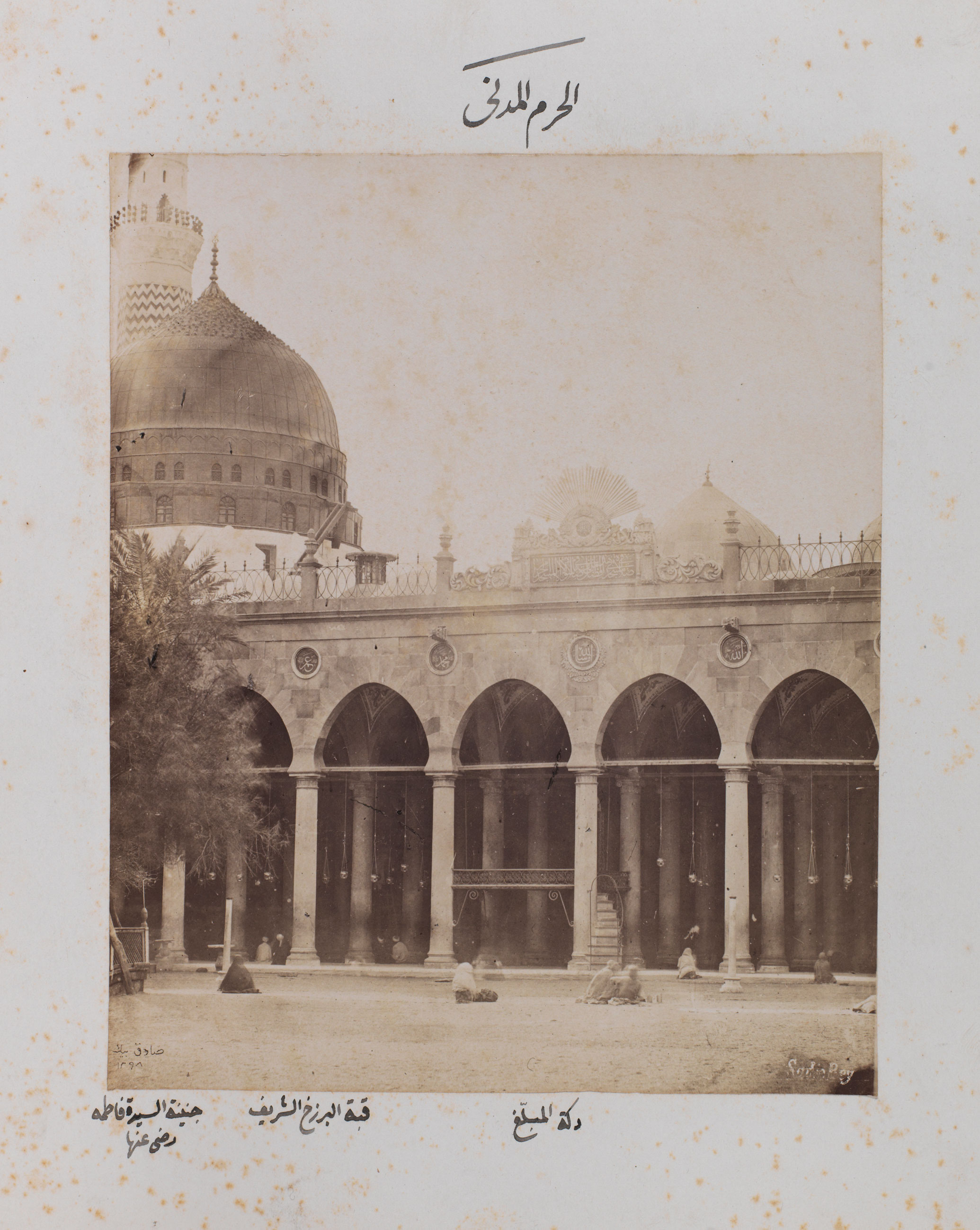
The sanctuary at Medina, photographed in 1880, signed by Sadiq Bey

Born in Cairo, Sadiq was educated in Cairo's military college and at the Paris École Polytechnique. He qualified as a colonel in the Egyptian army and returned to the military college to teach cartographic drawing.

In 1861, he was assigned to visit the region of Arabia from Medina to the port of Al Wajh and conduct a detailed survey. He took a small team and some surveying equipment as well as his own camera; photography was not part of the official mission. His records of the expedition are the earliest known detailed accounts of the region's climate and settlements. His photographs of Medina were the first ever taken there. In 1880 he was assigned to accompany the Hajj pilgrim caravan from Egypt to Mecca as its treasurer. He was responsible for the safe passage of the mahmal, a ceremonial passenger-less litter, to Mecca. Again he brought a camera, becoming the first person to photograph Mecca, the Great Mosque, the Kaaba, and pilgrim camps at Mina and Arafat.

In the 1870s he was given the title Bey and two decades later the higher rank of Pasha. By the end of his military career he reached the rank of liwa, equivalent to Major-General. He was briefly the governor of the Egyptian city of Arish but returned to Cairo after suffering sunstroke. He was married for 34 years; his wife died while accompanying him on a trip to Medina and is buried there. Sadiq died in Cairo in 1902.

== Photographs ==
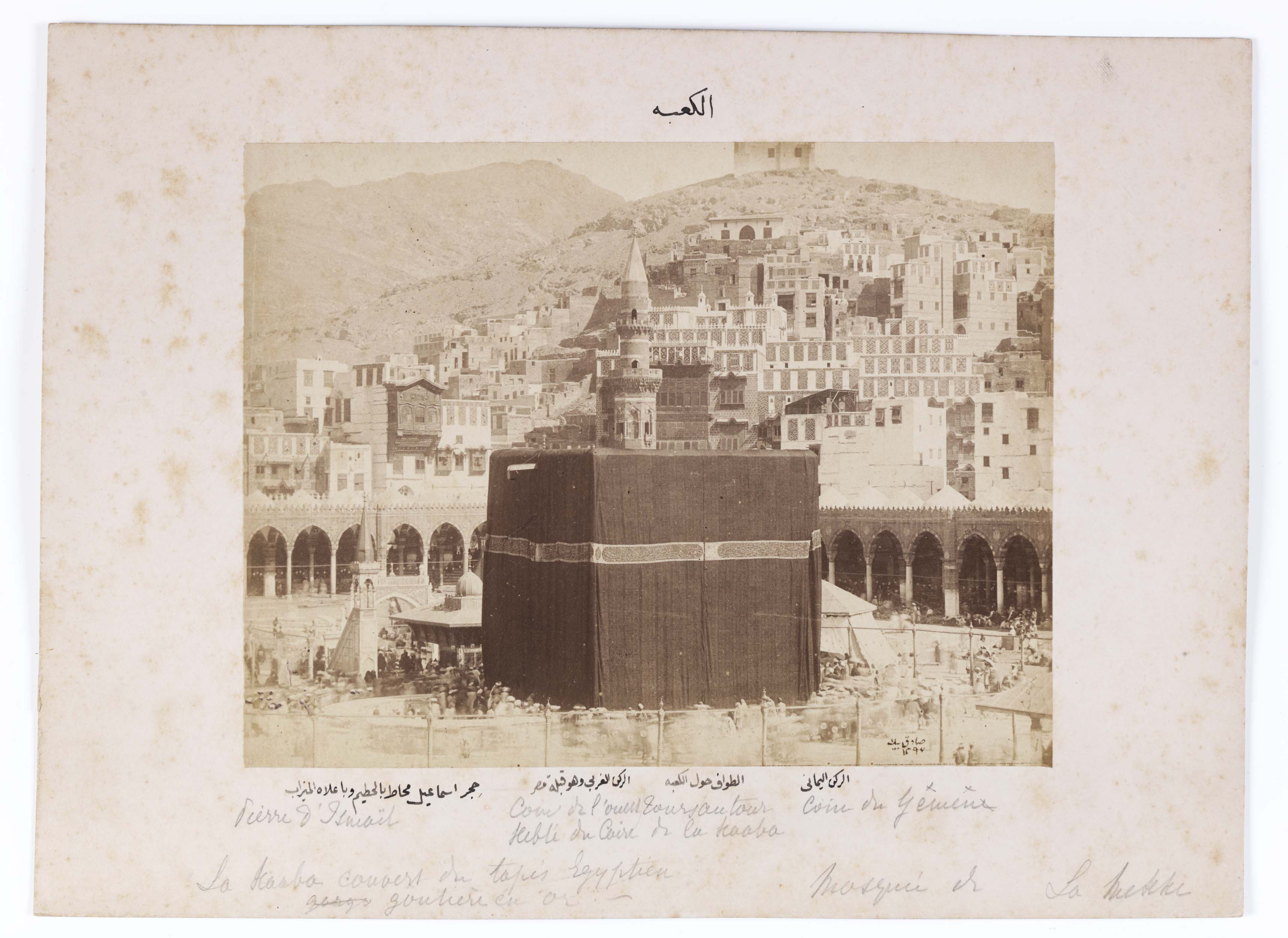
The Kaaba, photographed in 1880

Sadiq used a wet-plate collodion camera, which had been invented in the 1850s. This produced negatives on wet glass plates, requiring a portable darkroom. From these negatives he made albumen prints which he signed or, later, stamped.

The sanctuaries of Mecca and Medina are the holiest sites of Islam. As part of the Hajj which is one of the Five Pillars of Islam, pilgrims perform rituals at Mecca and other nearby sites. On his expeditions from 1861 to 1881, Sadiq photographed the interiors and exteriors of sites on the Hajj pilgrimage route as well as at Medina. Photographing Al-Masjid an-Nabawi (The Prophet's Mosque) and its surroundings in Medina on 11 February 1861, he noted in his diary that no one had taken such photographs before.

He used walls and mosque roofs as vantage points to capture panoramas of the cities. He also photographed people connected to the holy sites. As well as the Hajj pilgrims walking around the Kaaba, he photographed Shaykh 'Umar al-Shaibi, the keeper of the key of the Kaaba, and Sharif Shawkat Pasha, guardian of the Prophet's Mosque.

In 1876, his photographs of Medina were displayed at the Centennial Exposition in Philadelphia. He presented an album of twelve photographs at the 1881 Third International Conference of Geographers in Venice, winning a gold medal. As a result, this set was published as Collection de Vues Photographiques de La Mecque et de Médine.

His photographs are held today by collections including the Khalili Collection of Hajj and the Arts of Pilgrimage, the Victoria and Albert Museum, the Reiss Engelhorn Museum, and the Harvard Fine Arts Library. The curator Claude Sui describes Sadiq's achievements in photography as very significant: "[T]he sheer quality of his photographs is evidence of his talent in this field and reveals professional standards in his handling of the wet collodion procedure". His photography reflects both a cartographer's awareness of spatial relationships and a devout Muslim's connection to the region, culture, and people.

== Publications ==
The report of his 1861 visit to Medina was later published in 1877 in the Egyptian Military Gazette and then in a book, Summary of the Exploration of the Wajh-Madinah Hijaz Route and its Military Cadastral Map.

His other publications include:

- Collection de Vues Photographiques de La Mecque et de Médine, 1881. This was a set of twelve photographs of stations of the Hajj, including four panoramas.
- Mash'al al-mahmal ("The Torch of the Mahmal"), 1881.
- Kawkab al-hajj fi sayr al-mahmal bahran wa sayrihi barran ("The Star of the Hajj along the Travels of the Mahmal by Sea and Land"), 1886.
- Dalil al-hajj li'l-warid nin Makkah wa al-Madinah ("The Guide to the Hajj for Those Arriving in Makkah and Madinah from every Direction"), 1896.

All his books combine photographs and written advice for Hajj pilgrims based on his repeated visits to the area. His publications in French were a summary of his work that missed out the detail of his Arabic publications, so for a long time the non-Arabic world was unaware of his achievements.

== Gallery ==
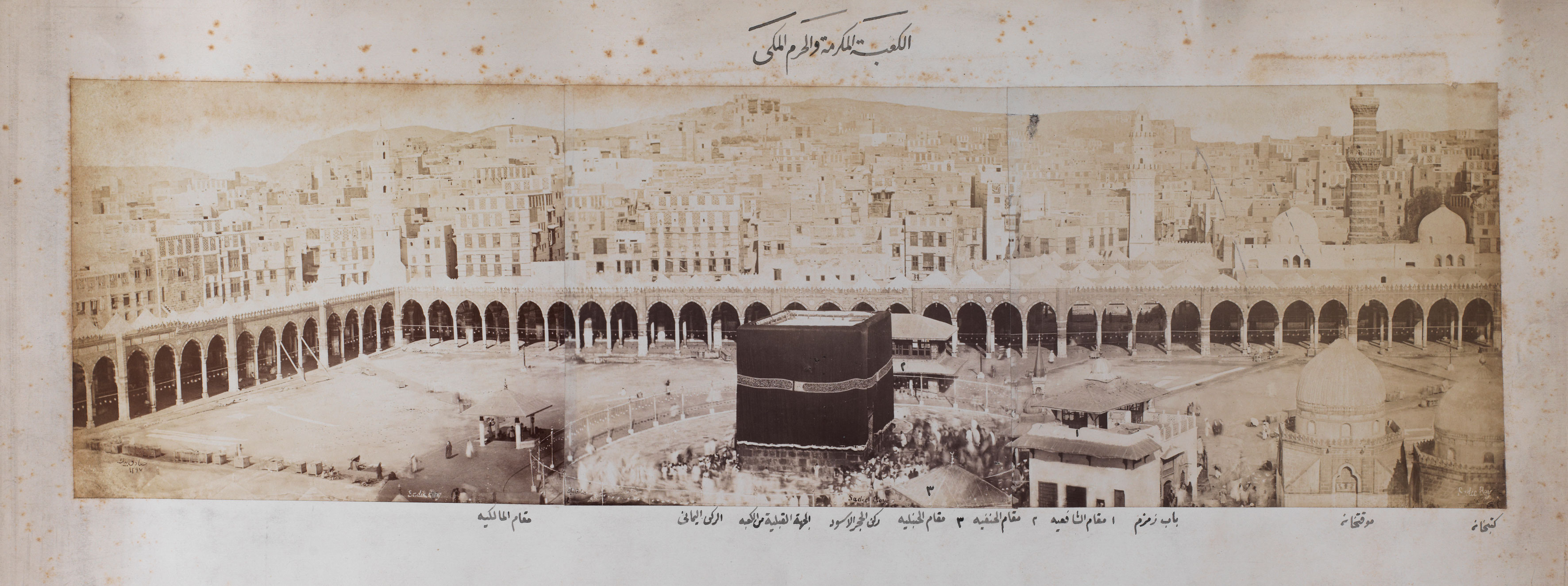
Panorama of the Kaaba and the Meccan sanctuary

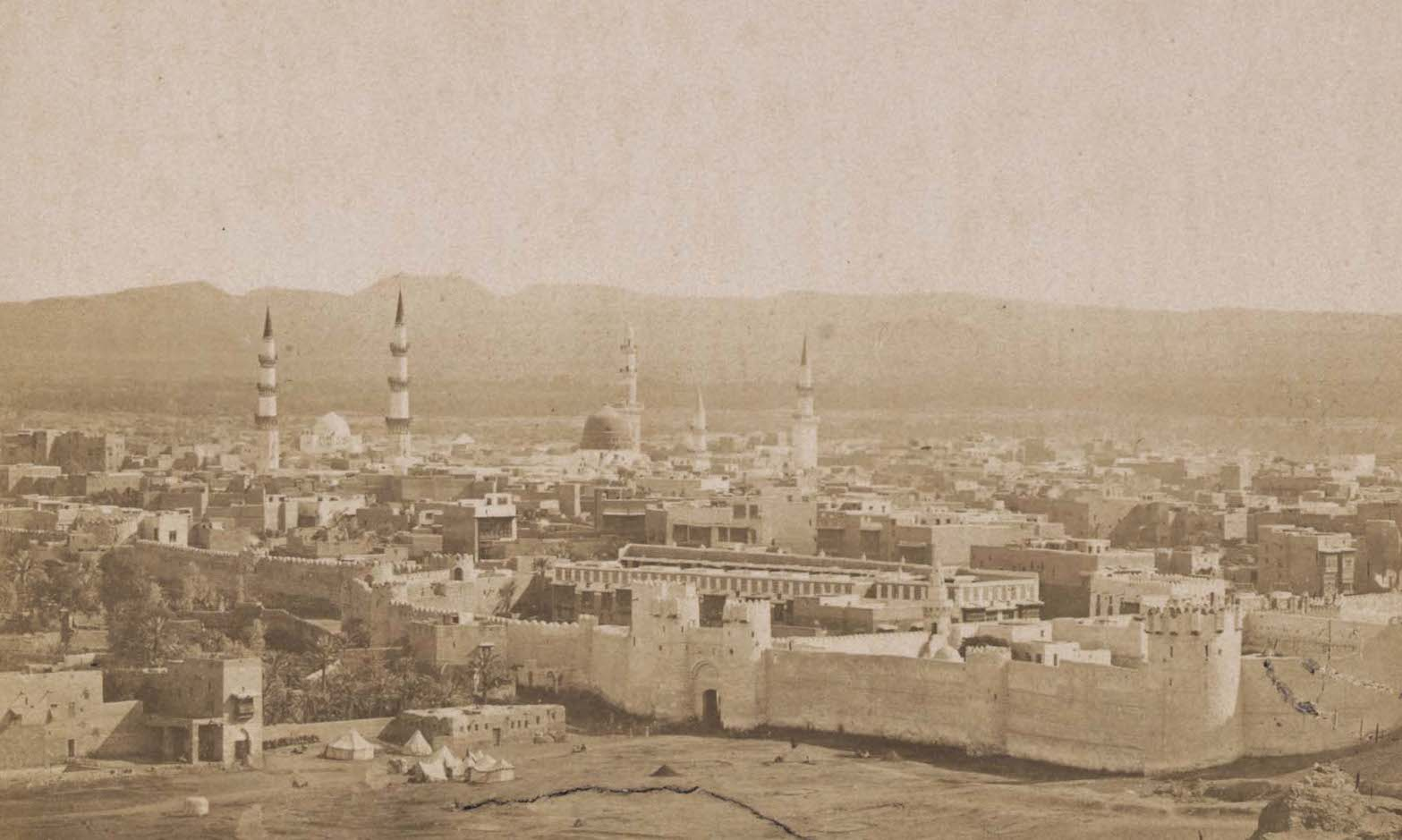
A general view of Medina, including the Al-Masjid an-Nabawi and its Green Dome

== See also ==
- Christiaan Snouck Hurgronje, first European to photograph Mecca
