= Khalili Collection of Hajj and the Arts of Pilgrimage =

Collection of items relating to Islamic pilgrimage

The Nasser D. Khalili Collection of Hajj and the Arts of Pilgrimage
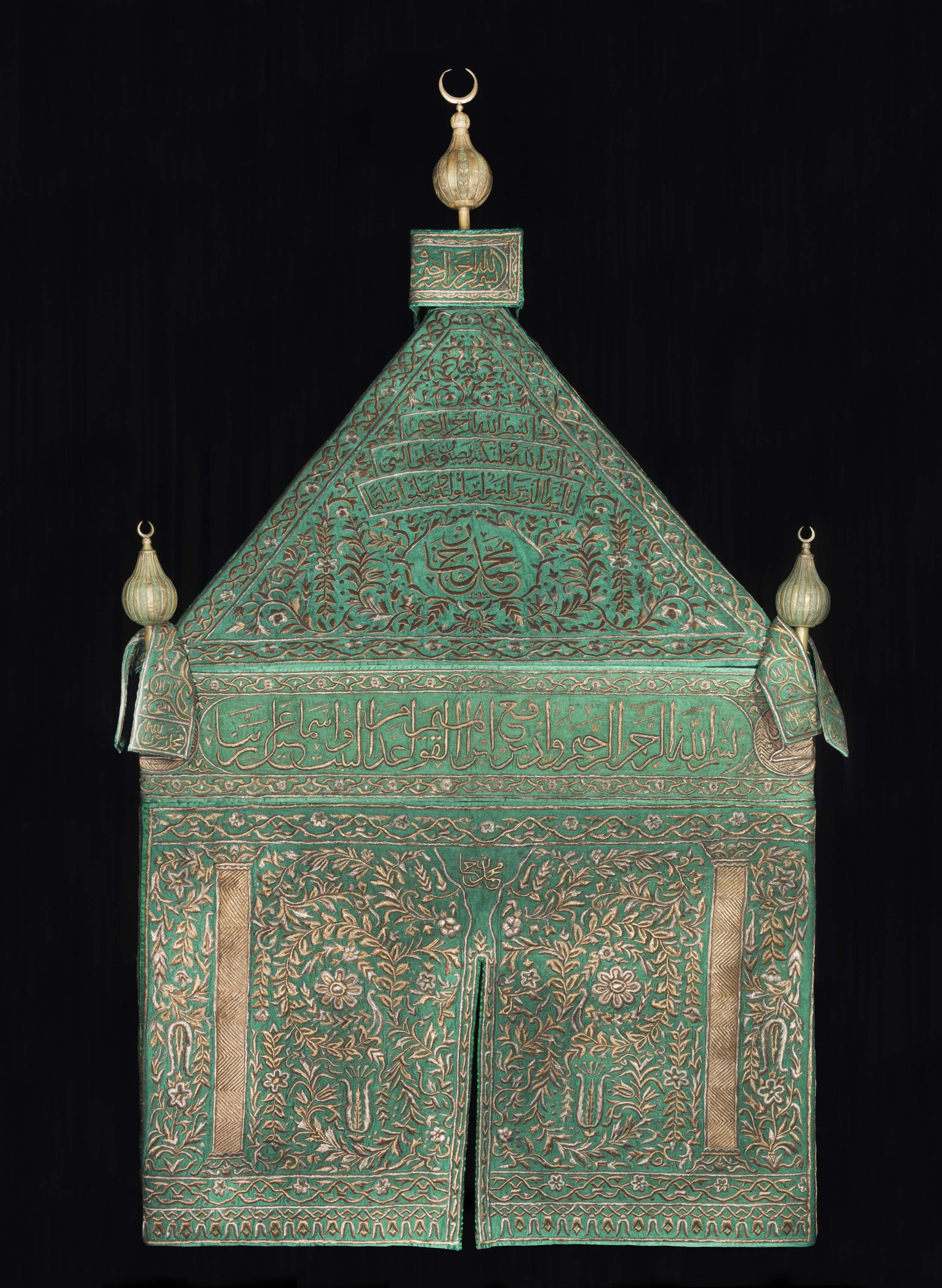
- A Complete Cover for a Damascus Mahmal, Istanbul, 17th century
- Curators: Nasser D. Khalili (founder); Nahla Nassar (curator and registrar); Qaisra Khan (curator)
- Size (no. of items): 5,000
- Website: www.khalilicollections.org/all-collections/hajj-and-the-arts-of-pilgrimage/

The Khalili Collection of Hajj and the Arts of Pilgrimage is a private collection of around 5,000 items relating to the Hajj, the pilgrimage to the holy city of Mecca which is a religious duty in Islam. It is one of eight collections assembled, conserved, published and exhibited by the British scholar, collector and philanthropist Nasser Khalili; each collection is considered among the most important in its field. The collection's 300 textiles include embroidered curtains from the Kaaba, the Station of Abraham, the Mosque of the Prophet Muhammad and other holy sites, as well as textiles that would have formed part of pilgrimage caravans from Egypt or Syria. It also has illuminated manuscripts depicting the practice and folklore of the Hajj as well as photographs, art pieces, and commemorative objects relating to the Hajj and the holy sites of Mecca and Medina.

Part of the collection was exhibited at the British Museum in 2012 and it has lent objects for exhibition in other countries. It is documented in a 2022 single-volume summary, with a 7-volume comprehensive catalog in the works. Alongside the Topkapı Palace museum, it has been described as "the largest and most significant group of objects relating to the cultural history of the Hajj".

== Background: the Hajj ==
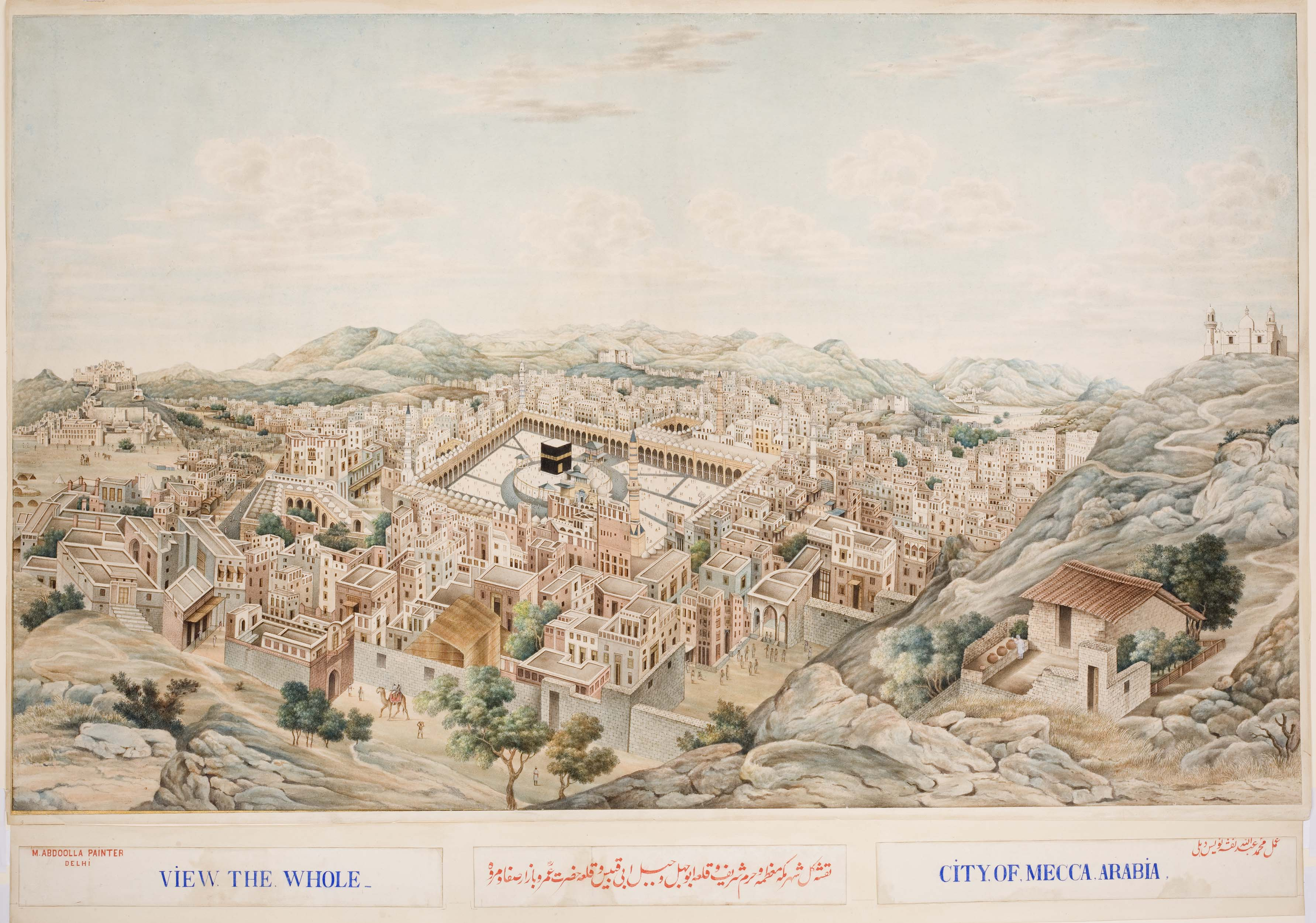
Panoramic view of Mecca by Muhammad Abdallah, 1845

The Hajj (Arabic: حَجّ) is an annual Islamic pilgrimage to the sacred city of Mecca in Saudi Arabia, the holiest city for Muslims. Hajj is a mandatory religious duty for Muslims that must be carried out at least once in their lifetime by all adult Muslims who are physically and financially capable of undertaking the journey, and can support their family during their absence.

Hajj is one of the Five Pillars of Islam, alongside Shahadah (confession of faith), Salat (prayer), Zakat (charity), and Sawm (fasting). The Hajj is a demonstration of the solidarity of the Muslim people, and their submission to God (Allah). The word Hajj means "to attend a journey", which connotes both the outward act of a journey and the inward act of intentions. In the centre of the Masjid al-Haram mosque in Mecca is the Kaaba, a cubic building known in Islam as the House of God. The cloth covering of the Kaaba is known as the kiswah and is changed each year. A Hajj consists of several distinct rituals including the tawaf (procession seven times counterclockwise round the Kaaba), wuquf (a vigil at Mount Arafat where Mohammed is said to have preached his last sermon), and ramy al-jamarāt (stoning of the Devil).

== The collection ==
The British-Iranian collector Nasser Khalili has assembled, conserved, published and exhibited eight art collections, including the largest private collection of Islamic art. Patricia Scotland, Secretary-General of the Commonwealth of Nations, has described Khalili's collection as, alongside the Topkapı Palace museum in Istanbul, "the largest and most significant group of objects relating to the cultural history of the Hajj". Baroness Amos, Director of the School of Oriental and African Studies in London, has described it as "the greatest collection of objects related to Makkah [Mecca] and the Hajj." Its objects range from the 8th to the 20th century and from Morocco in the West to China in the East.

In 2022 the publisher Assoulyne has released a 408-page volume documenting the collection's 5,000 objects, authored by one of the curators, Qaisra M. Khan. The Hajj collection has also been documented in a series of nine volumes.

== Objects in the collection ==
=== Textiles ===
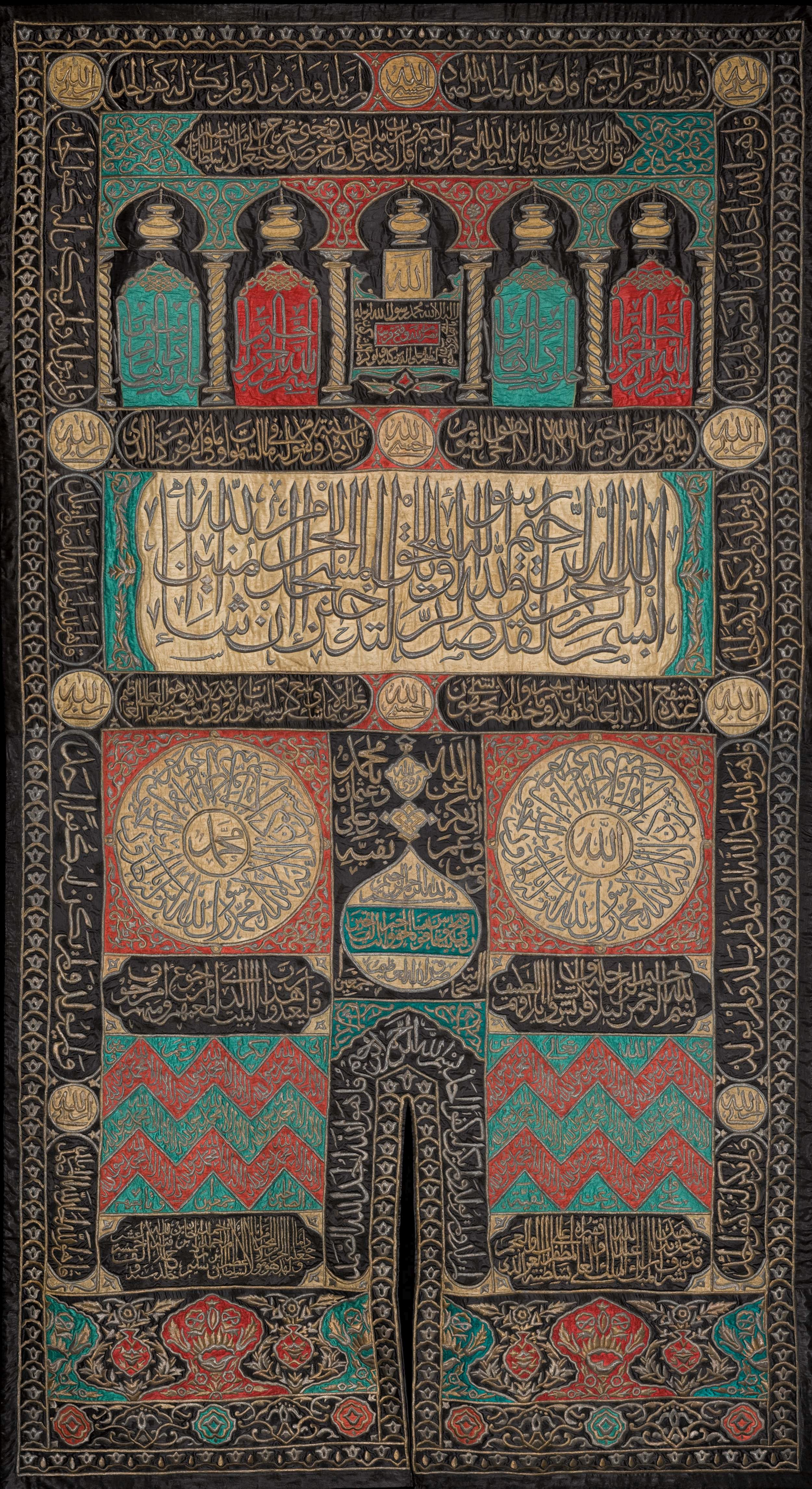
Curtain for door of the Kaaba, Cairo, Egypt, 1015 AH (1606 AD)

The collection includes more than 300 textiles made for holy sites. As well as the textiles themselves, the collection has archival material including ledgers and photographs from the Cairo workshops where the textiles are produced for Mecca and Medina.

A mahmal is a passenger-less litter usually carried on a camel among a caravan of pilgrims. These would bear the name of the Ottoman ruler, symbolising their protection of the holy places. The collection has seven mahmal coverings from caravans that would have set out from Egypt or Syria; the earliest was made in 17th century Istanbul at the request of Mehmed IV. Standing 355 centimetres (140 in) high, its silk is embroidered in silver and silver-gilt wire. The most recent mahmal covering, from the end of the 19th century, bears the name of Abdul Hamid II.

Other textiles include coverings used on the Kaaba, on the Prophet's Mosque in Medina, or in the Prophet's tomb. Some served as bags for the key to the Kaaba. The covering of the Kaaba, replaced annually, is known as the kiswah and the ornate curtain that covers its door is a sitarah, also known as a burdah or burqu'. A sitarah for the Kaaba, 499 centimetres (196 in) high, dates from 1606. Made in Cairo, it was commissioned by Ahmed I. Others, similarly embroidered with multiple verses from the Quran, were commissioned by Abdülmejid I and Mahmud II. The internal door of the Kaaba, the bab al-tawbah, has its own textile covering which was similarly made in Cairo and replaced annually. The collection has examples from the 19th and early 20th centuries.

The Prophet's Mosque includes the tomb of Muhammad and, between the tomb and the minbar (pulpit), the Rawḍah ash-Sharifah (Noble Garden), carpeted in green. Sitarahs cover the minbar and some internal doors of the mosque, the metal grille around his tomb, and the doors of the Rawdah. The collection includes several of these sitarahs from the 18th century onwards. A red silk sitarah 280 centimetres (110 in) high was made in Istanbul in the early 19th century. It bears the cartouche of Mahmud II who commissioned it for the Rawdah. A section of curtain for the tomb, made in Istanbul in the 18th century, has calligraphed inscriptions in silver-wrapped silk thread on a deep red background. This is one of eight surviving pieces of a single textile; another is in the collection of the Topkapı Palace in Istanbul.

The Maqam Ibrahim (Station of Abraham) is a small square stone in the Masjid al-Haram mosque which, according to Islamic tradition, bears the footprint of Abraham. It used to be housed in a structure that had its own kiswah (textile covering) made in Cairo and replaced every year, as happens now for the Kaaba. The collection includes a section from one such late-19th-century kiswah, 200 centimetres (79 in) high, of black silk with silver and gold wire embroidery.

Talismanic cotton shirts are inked with prayers, quotes from the Quran, and schematic illustrations of the holy sanctuaries at Mecca and Medina, similar to what would appear on a pilgrimage certificate or illuminated manuscript. One in the collection dates from the 16th or early 17th century and another from the 18th or late 17th. Others, from the 16th century and 17th century Ottoman Empire, are calligraphed with many names of Allah in bright colours as a kind of protection for the wearer.

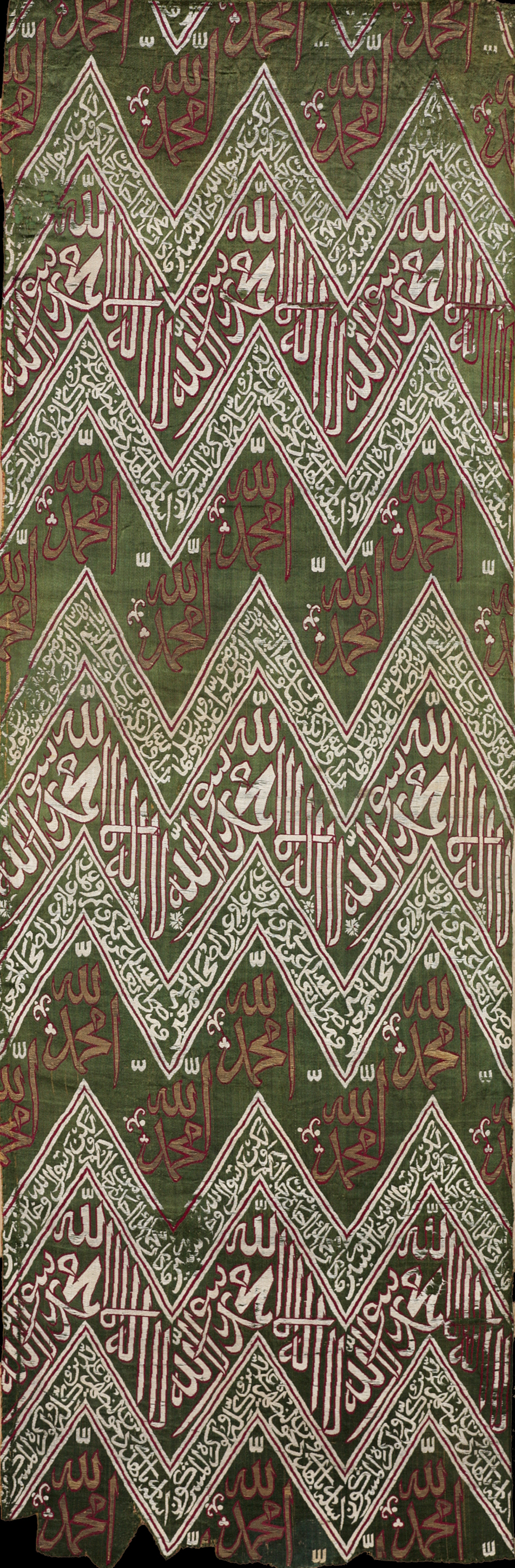
Section from the curtain of the Prophet's Tomb. Late 17th or early 18th century

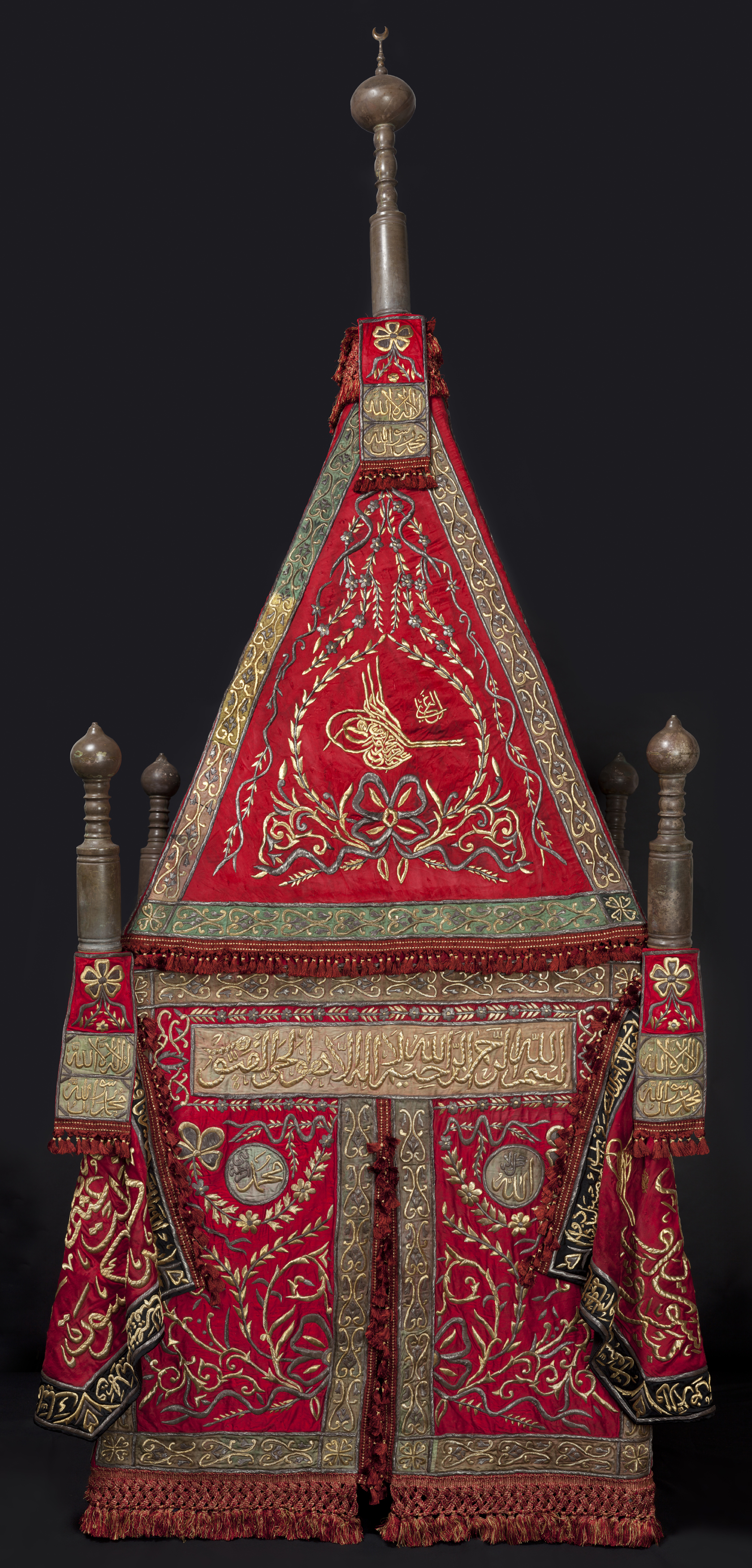
Mahmal cover and banners in red silk. Cairo, 1867–1876

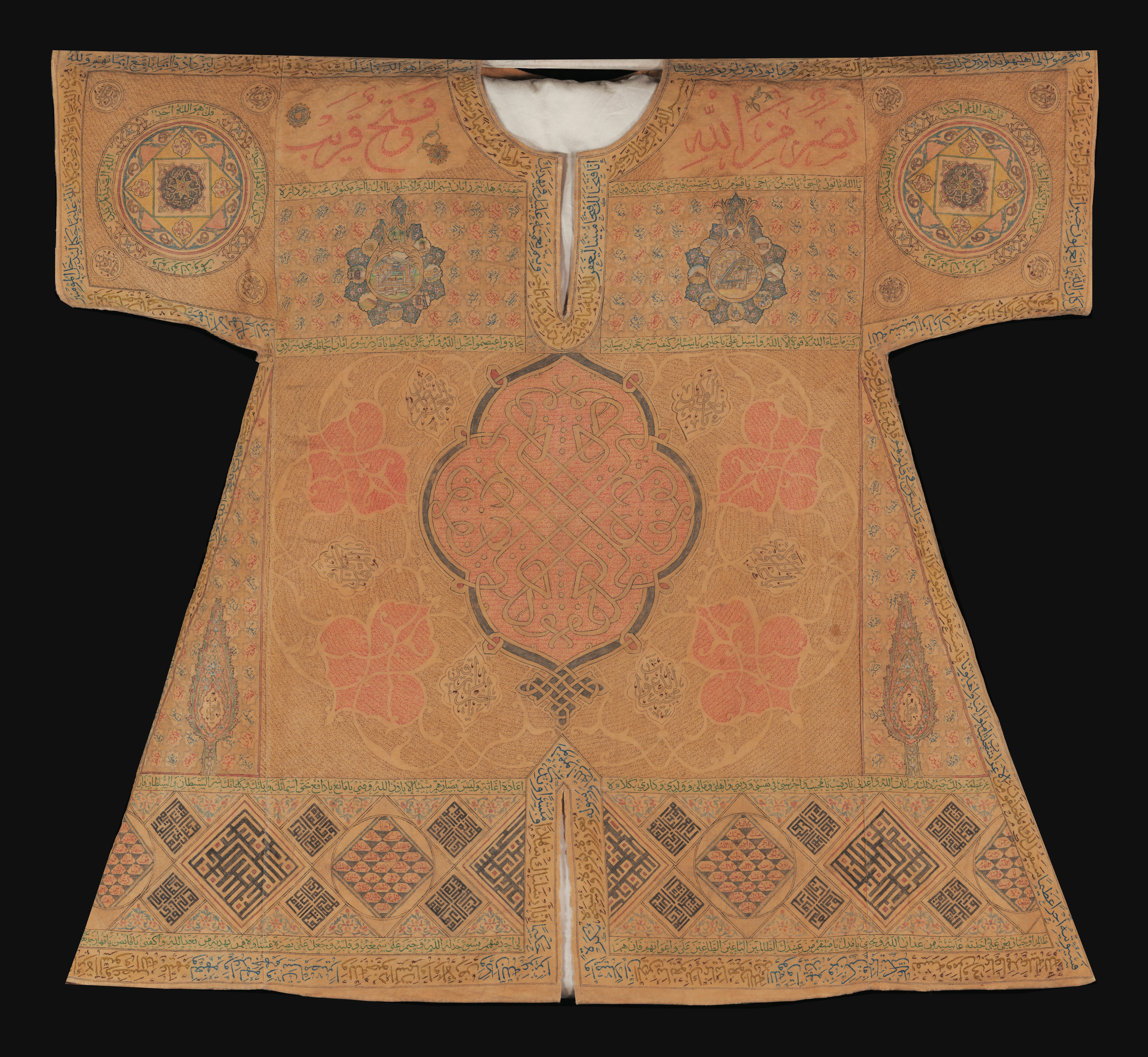
Talismanic shirt inscribed with Quranic verses, the Asma’ al-Husna, and prayers along with depictions of the two holy sanctuaries. Turkey, 18th century

=== Manuscripts and miniature paintings ===
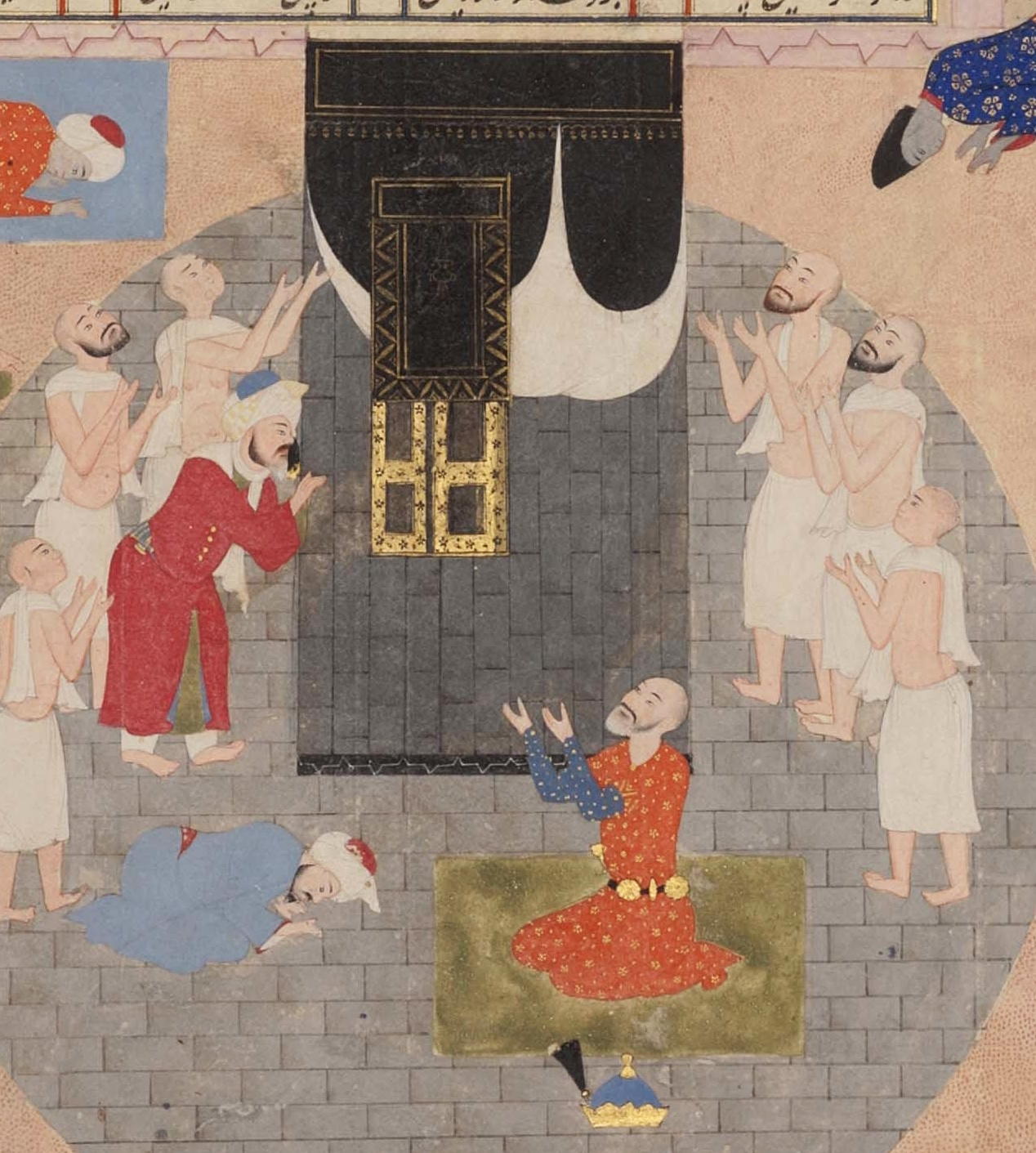
Alexander the Great at the Kaaba, in a folio from the Shahnameh, Shiraz, mid-16th century

The collection includes a folio from a 16th-century manuscript of Ferdowsi's Shahnameh (Book of Kings), depicting Alexander the Great kneeling in prayer at the Kaaba among other pilgrims. He is often portrayed in Islam as having performed a Hajj.

Anis Al-Hujjaj (Pilgrim's Companion) is a seventeenth century account of a Hajj undertaken in 1677 by Safi ibn Vali, an official of the Mughal court. The document gives advice to pilgrims about the journey. As well as showing diagrams of the routes and places of the Hajj, the illustrations colourfully depict the pilgrims travelling, living together in camps, and taking part in the Hajj rites. The Khalili collection includes an exemplar, thought to originate from Gujarat, which consists of 23 folios including nine half-page and eleven full-page illustrations. Another illuminated guide for pilgrims is the Futuh al-Haramayn of Muhi Al-Din Lari; the collection has exemplars from 16th century Mecca and late 18th or 19th century India.

Although it is rare for Qurans to include depictions of the holy sites of Mecca and Medina, the collection includes examples from the late 18th century that do so. The Dala'il al-Khayrat by Muhammad al-Jazuli is a very popular prayer book. The collection includes multiple exemplars, illuminated with diagrams of holy sites. A late 18th or early 19th century exemplar is presumably the source of a pair of detached pages depicting the holy sanctuaries of Mecca and Medina.

Another illuminated manuscript, consisting of 35 folios, sets out the family tree of the Prophet Mohammed with additional text about his life and companions. It dates from the 14th century Middle East, possibly Syria. A 16th century pilgrimage scroll from the Hejaz region records the rites an unnamed pilgrim conducted, combined with diagrams of the Prophet's tomb and other locations visited.

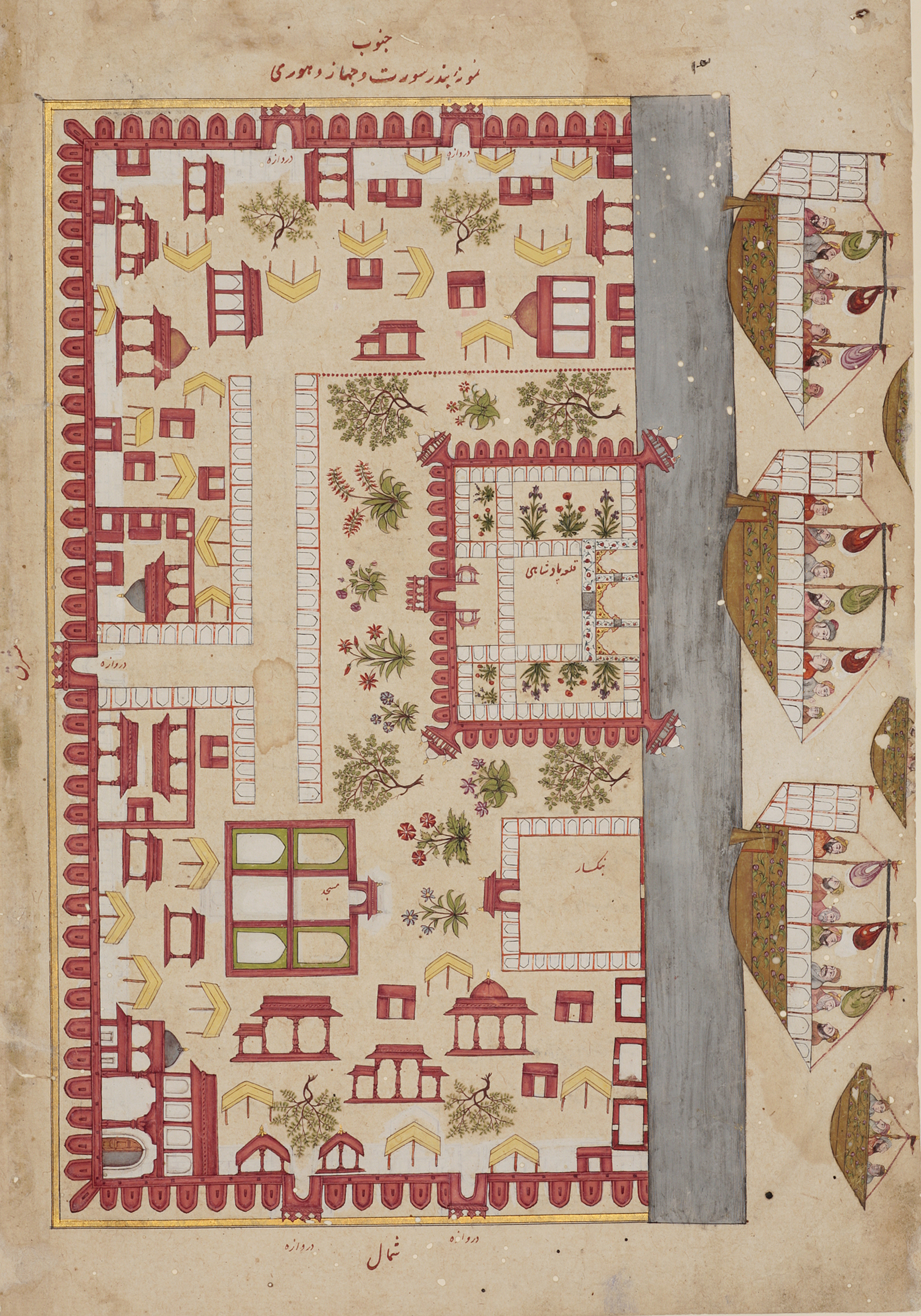
Folio from Anis Al-Hujjaj showing a plan of the port of Surat. Possibly Gujarat, circa 1677–80

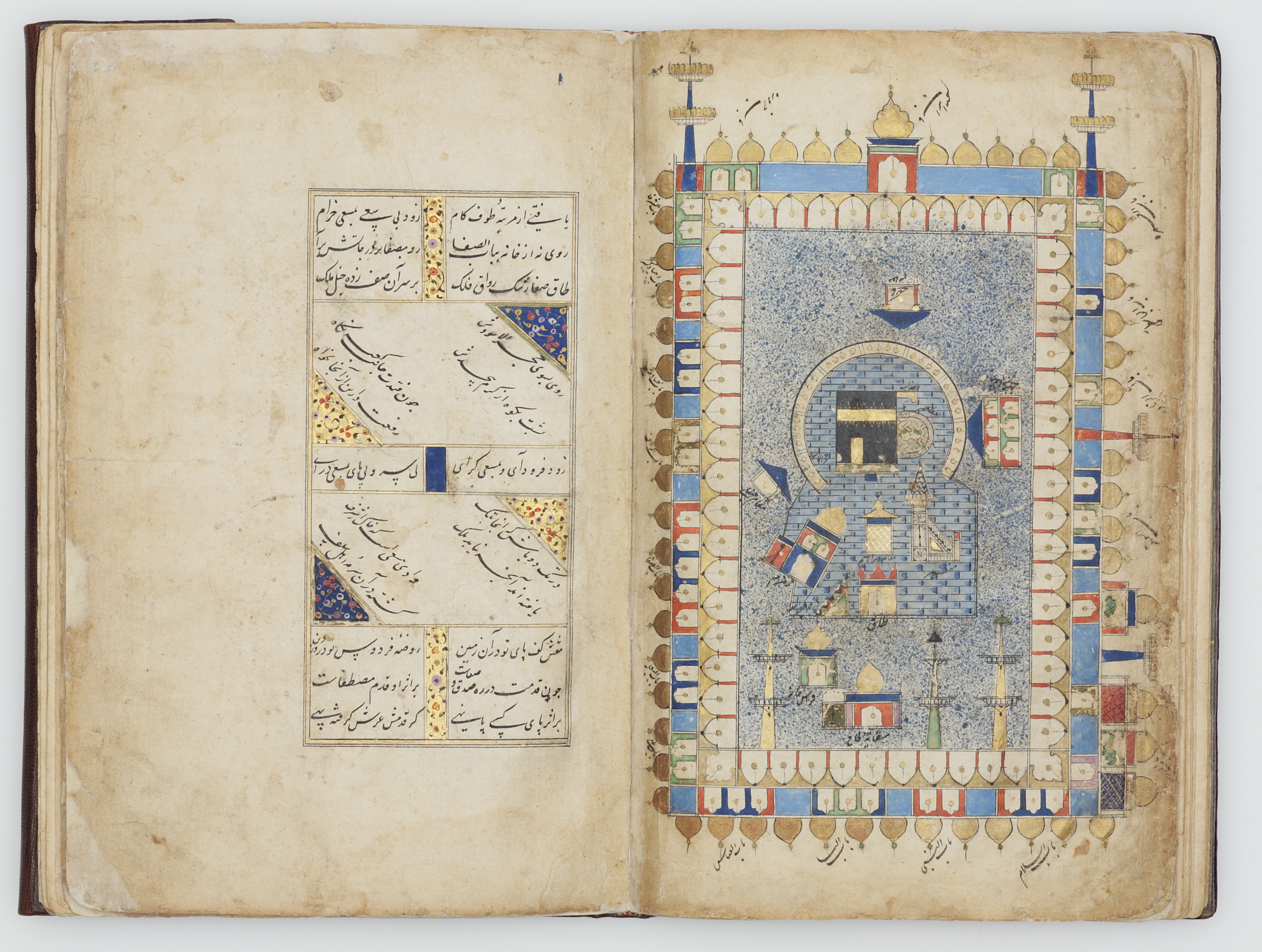
The Great Mosque depicted in the Futuh al-Haramayn, 1582

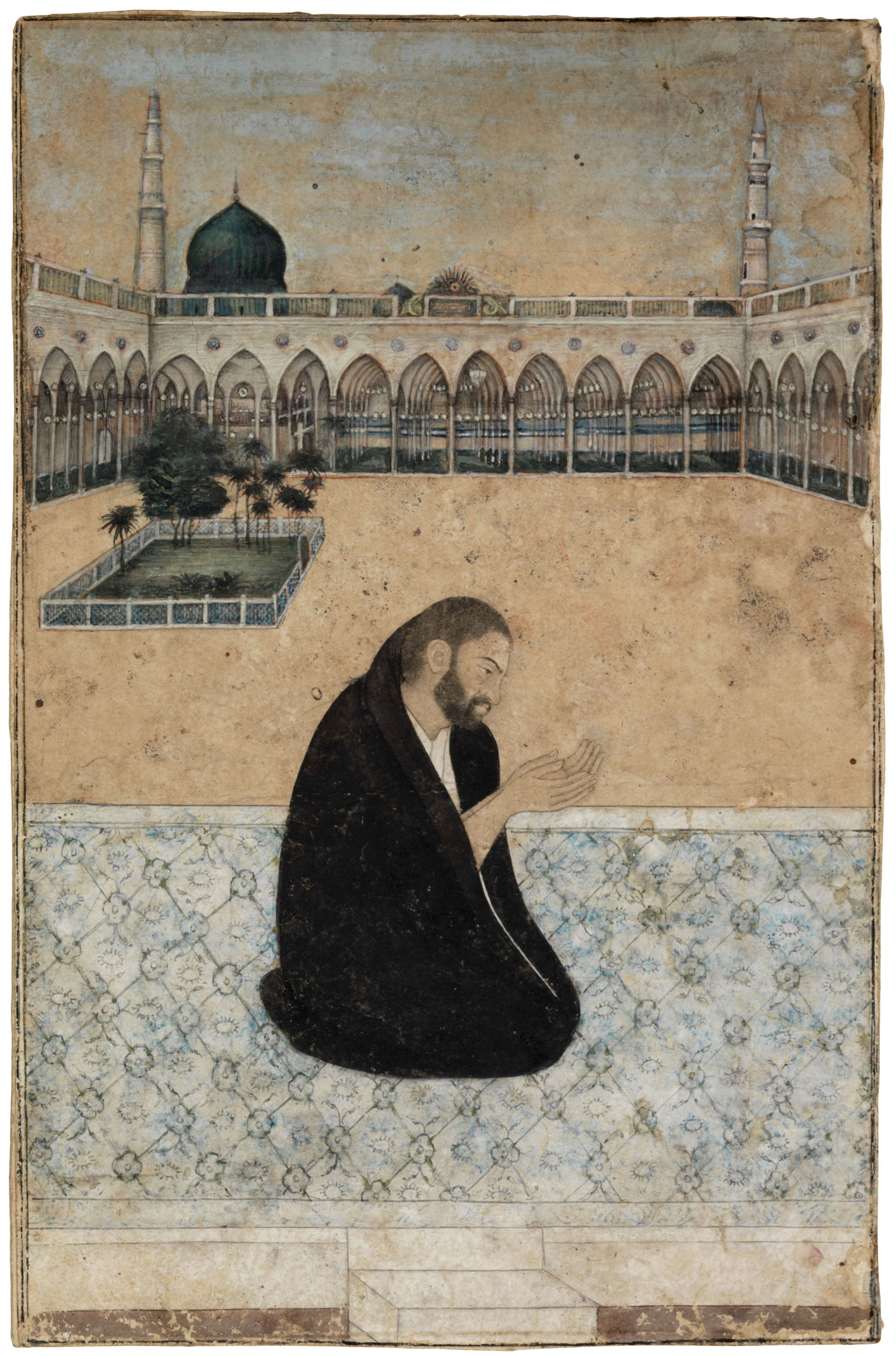
The Sufi saint Mian Mir praying at Medina. India, 18th century

=== Illustrations ===
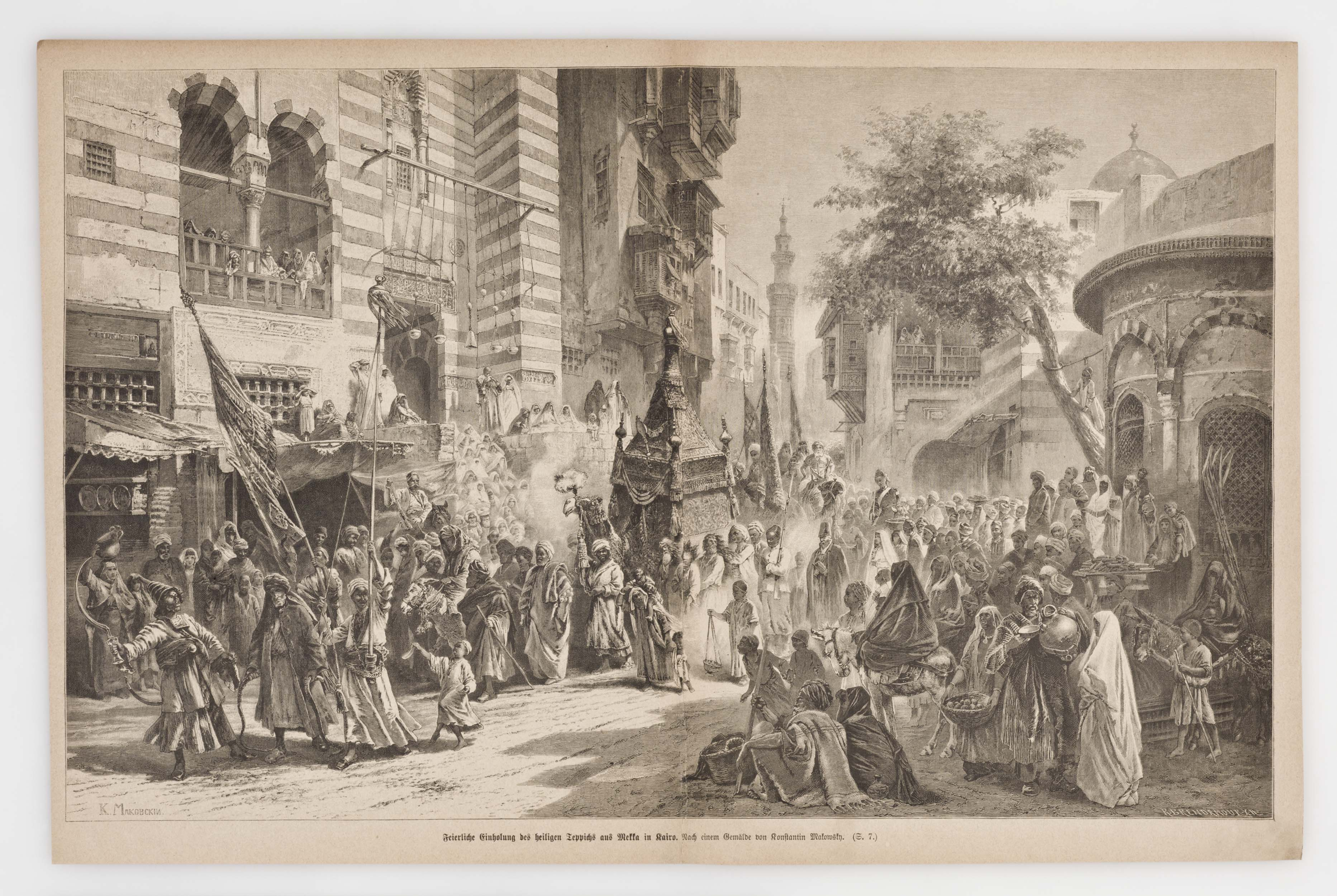
Konstantin Makovsky. The return of the mahmal from Mecca to Cairo. Woodcut, Germany 1893

A panoramic view of Mecca dating from around 1845 is the earliest known accurate depiction of the area around the Masjid al-Haram. The painter, Muhammad ‘Abdallah of Delhi, was the grandson of Mazar ‘Ali Khan, court artist for Bahadur Shah II, the last Mughal Emperor. An earlier, largely inaccurate, representation of Mecca and Medina is given in a 1727 album of architectural drawings by the Austrian architect Johann Bernhard Fischer von Erlach. A detached plate, carefully hand-coloured, from an 1825 edition of George Sale's English translation of the Quran, gives a plan and view of the Holy Sanctuary in Mecca.

=== Photographs ===
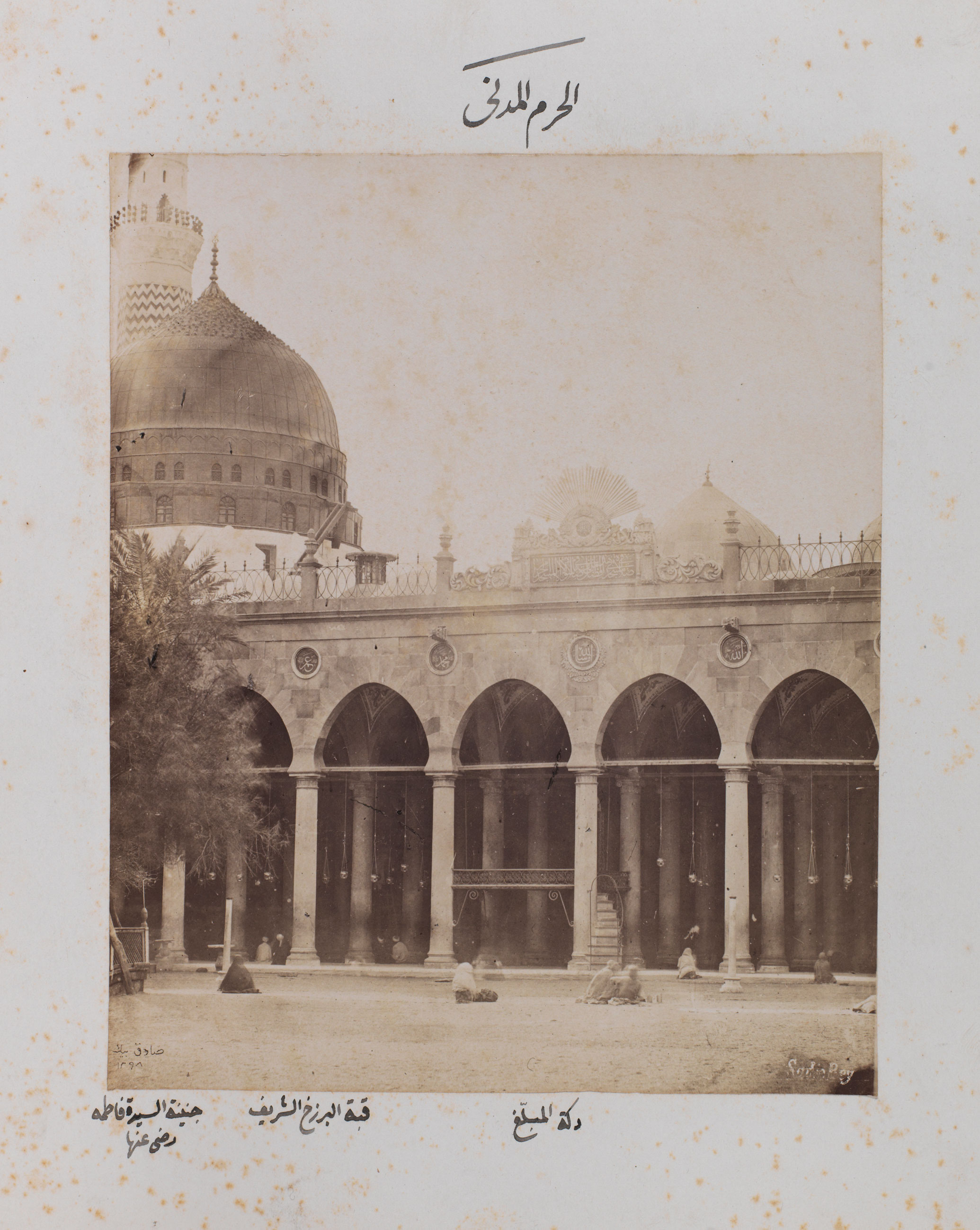
The Sanctuary at Medina photographed by Muhammad Sadiq, 1880

The collection includes a set of the earliest known photographs of Mecca and the Hajj, taken by Muhammad Sadiq, an Egypt-born photographer who was also treasurer of the Egyptian Hajj caravan. In 1880 and 1881, Muhammad Sadiq used glass plate photography to capture the Kaaba and other holy sites in Mecca, Medina, Mount Arafat, and Mina. Other photographers in the collection include Christiaan Snouck Hurgronje, the first European to photograph Mecca and Abd al-Ghaffar, a Meccan doctor who was the first local person to photograph the Great Mosque. Safouh Izzat Naamani (1926–2015) was the first to photograph Mecca from the air and the collection includes an aerial photograph from 1966, showing the then-new covering of the Safa and Marwa hills that pilgrims process between.

Art inspired by the Hajj has continued into the 21st century. One such work is the series of photogravure etchings by the artist Ahmad Mater titled Magnetism I–IV. Using iron filings and magnets, Mater created a scene centered on a black cube which visually evokes the pilgrims walking around the Kaaba.

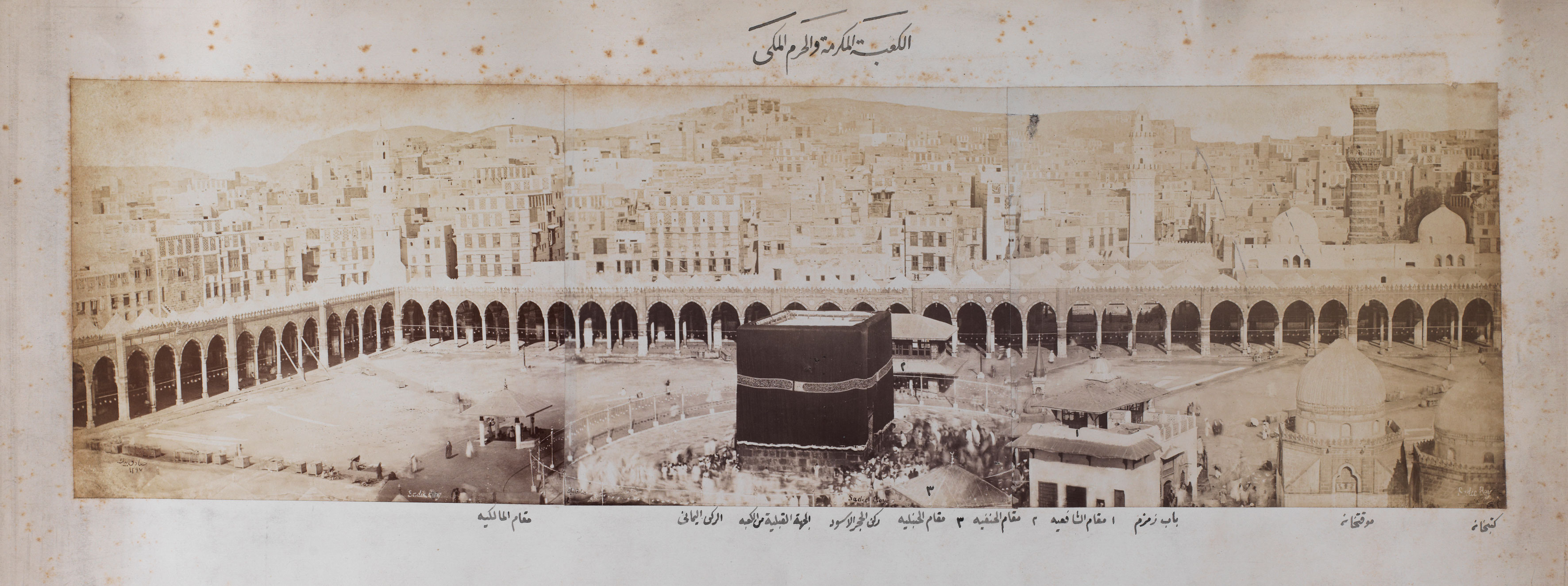
Panorama of the Kaaba and Meccan sanctuary by Muhammad Sadiq, 1880

=== Coins and medals ===
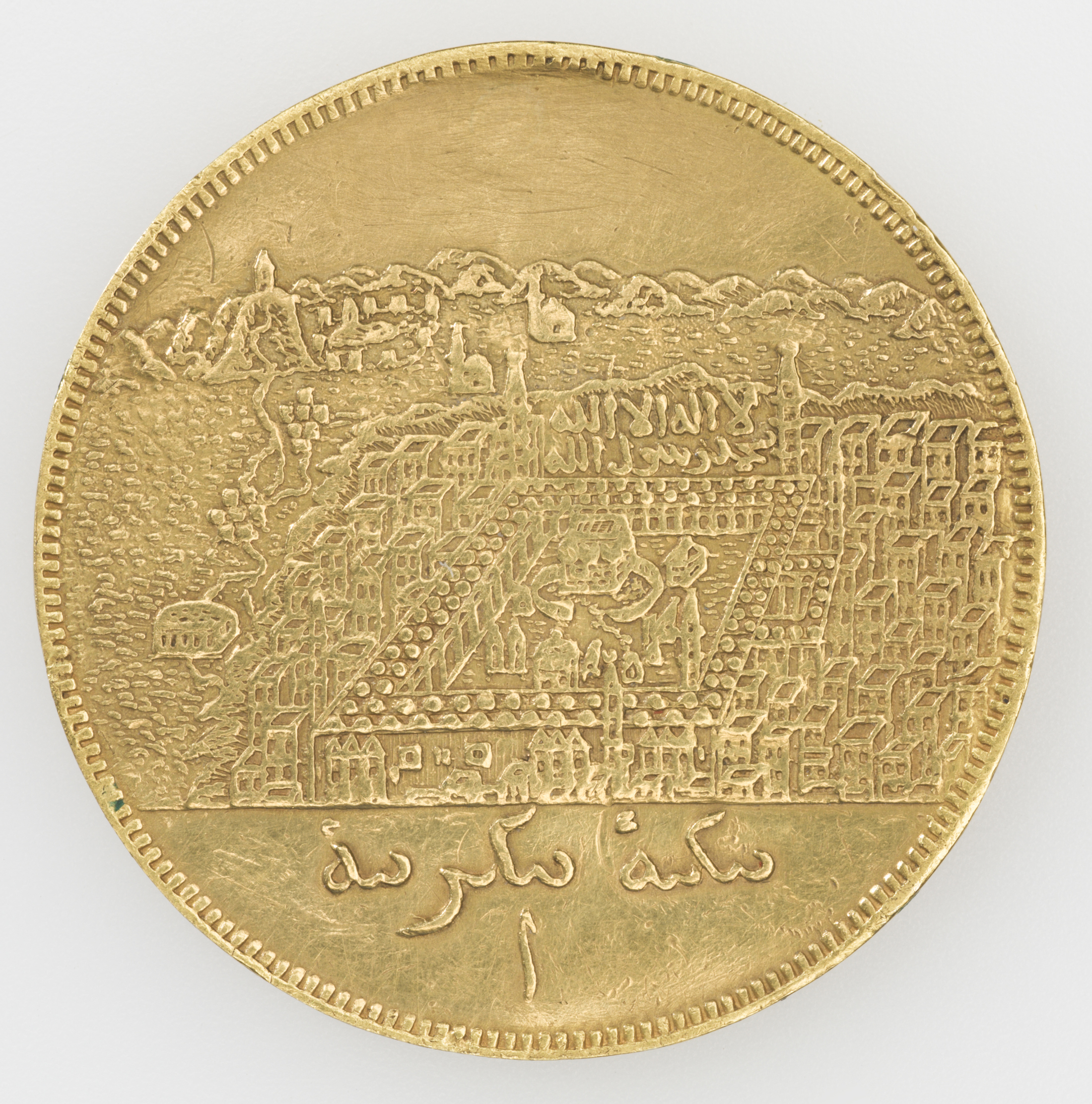
Medallion with views of Mecca and Medina, struck around 1845, Turkey or the Hijaz

The coins in the collection range from the Abbasid period of the 7th century to modern times. Many were struck in Mecca or elsewhere in Saudi Arabia. The oldest is a gold dinar from 105 AH (723–724 AD) struck in "the mine of the Commander of the Faithful in the Hijaz".

=== Other objects ===
Other kinds of objects in the collection were used during a pilgrimage, depict the holy sites, or otherwise celebrate the Hajj. There are water flasks, and Ihram belts carried by pilgrims, and Hajj certificates. There are scientific instruments, including qibla compasses (for finding the direction of Mecca) decorated with diagrams of the Kaaba. There are hilyes (calligraphic artworks relating the attributes of the Prophet Mohammed) from Ottoman Turkey. There are also stones that were used in a pendant featuring different Quranic verses, and relics holding dust compacted into pear-shaped wrapped elements, likely used as amulets. After independence in 1947, the State Bank of Pakistan issued Hajj banknotes. These made currency conversion easier for pilgrims and gave the banks more control over their currency. The collection has examples from Pakistan and India.

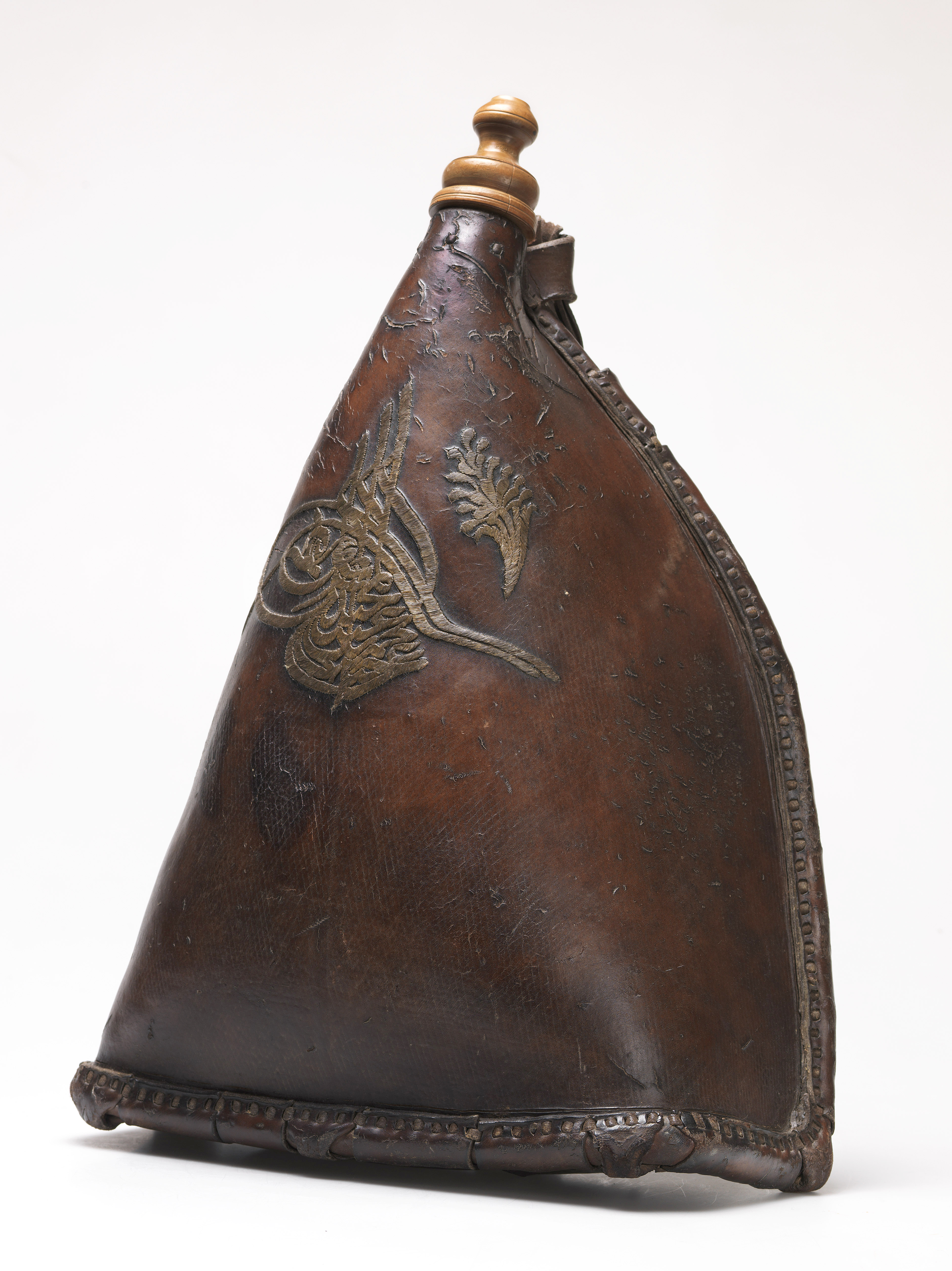
An imperial pilgrim's water flask, Turkey, 19th century

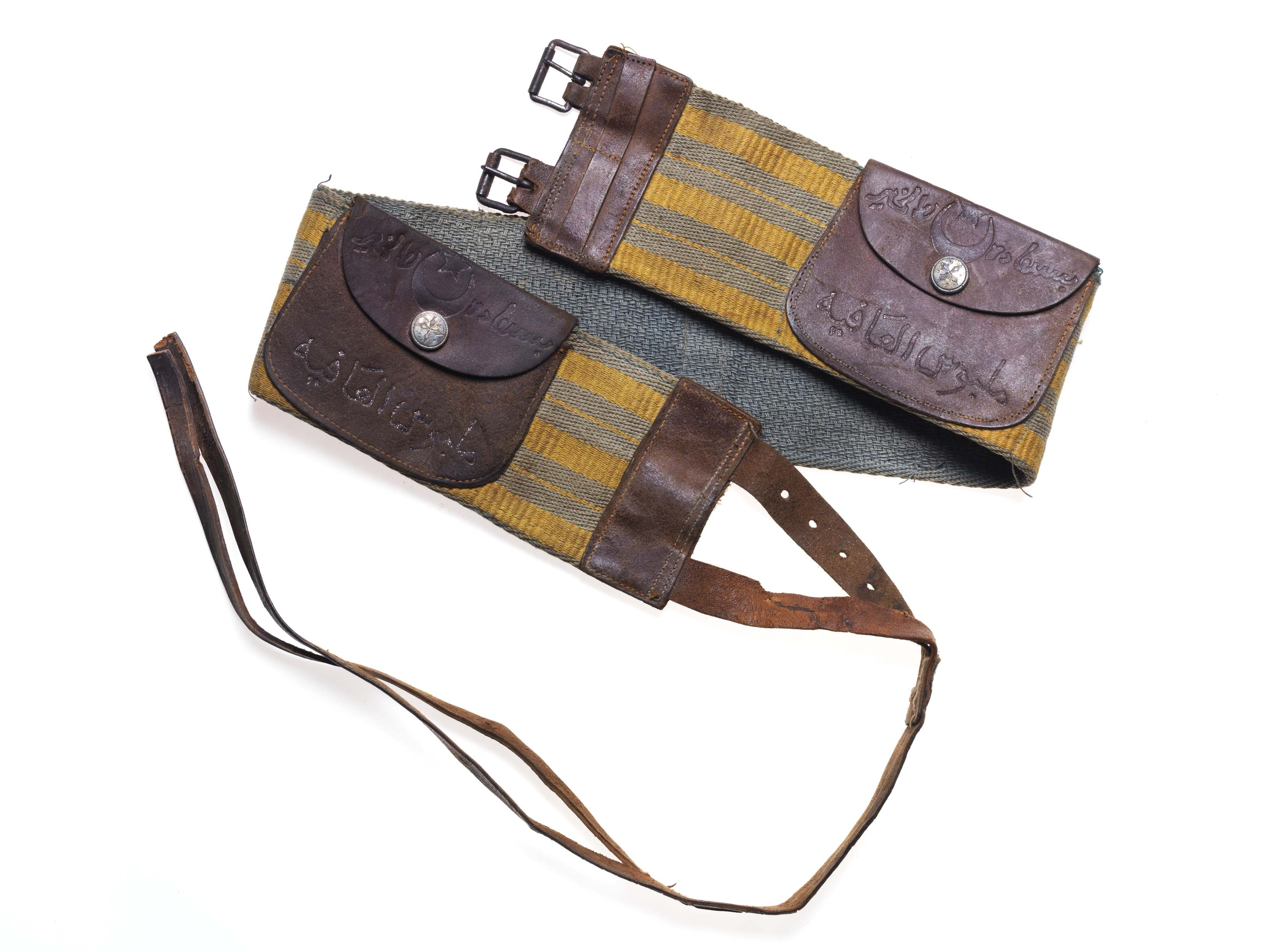
Ihram belt (ihram clothing), Turkey, 19th century

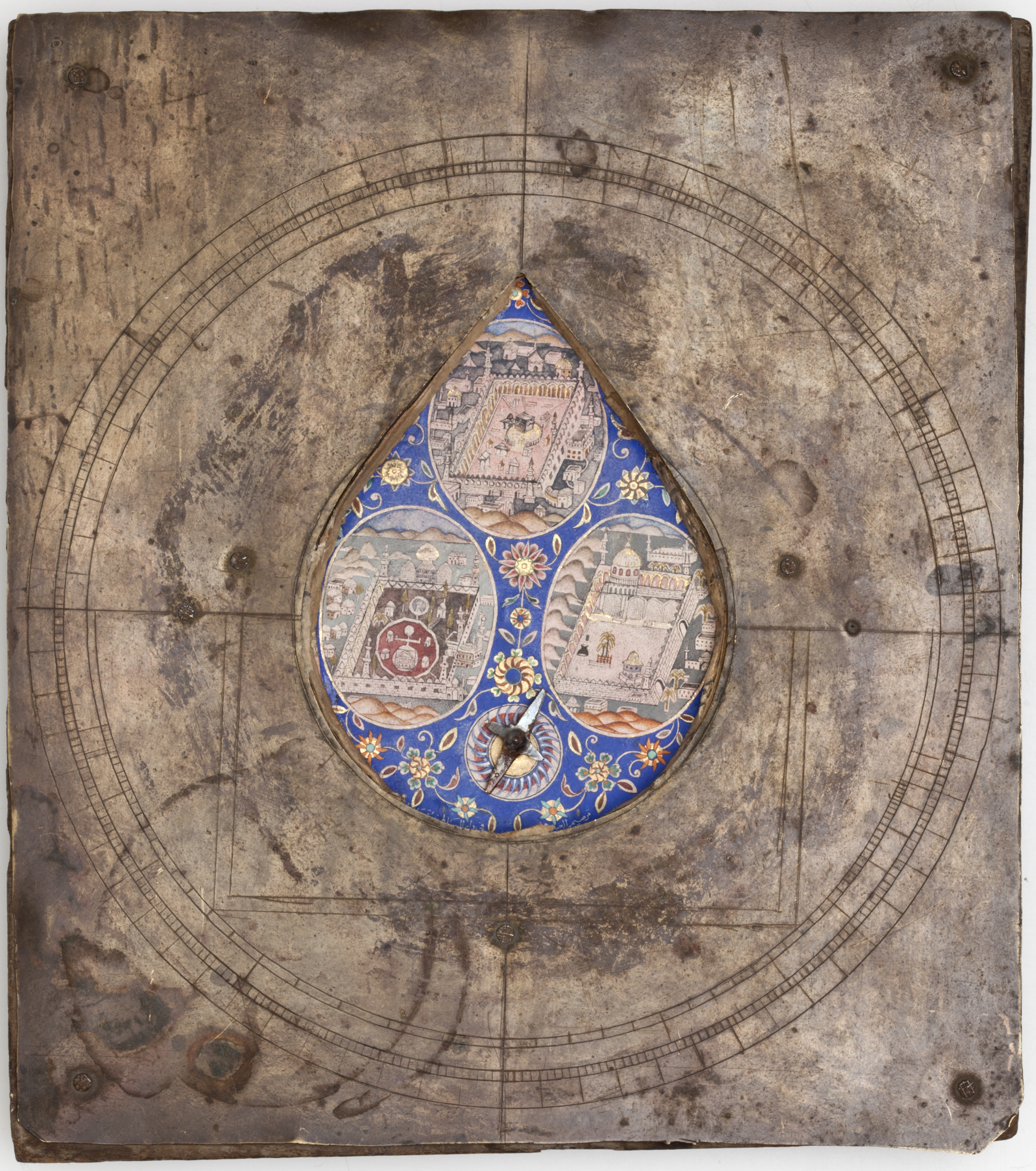
Qibla compass, Istanbul, 18th – early 19th century

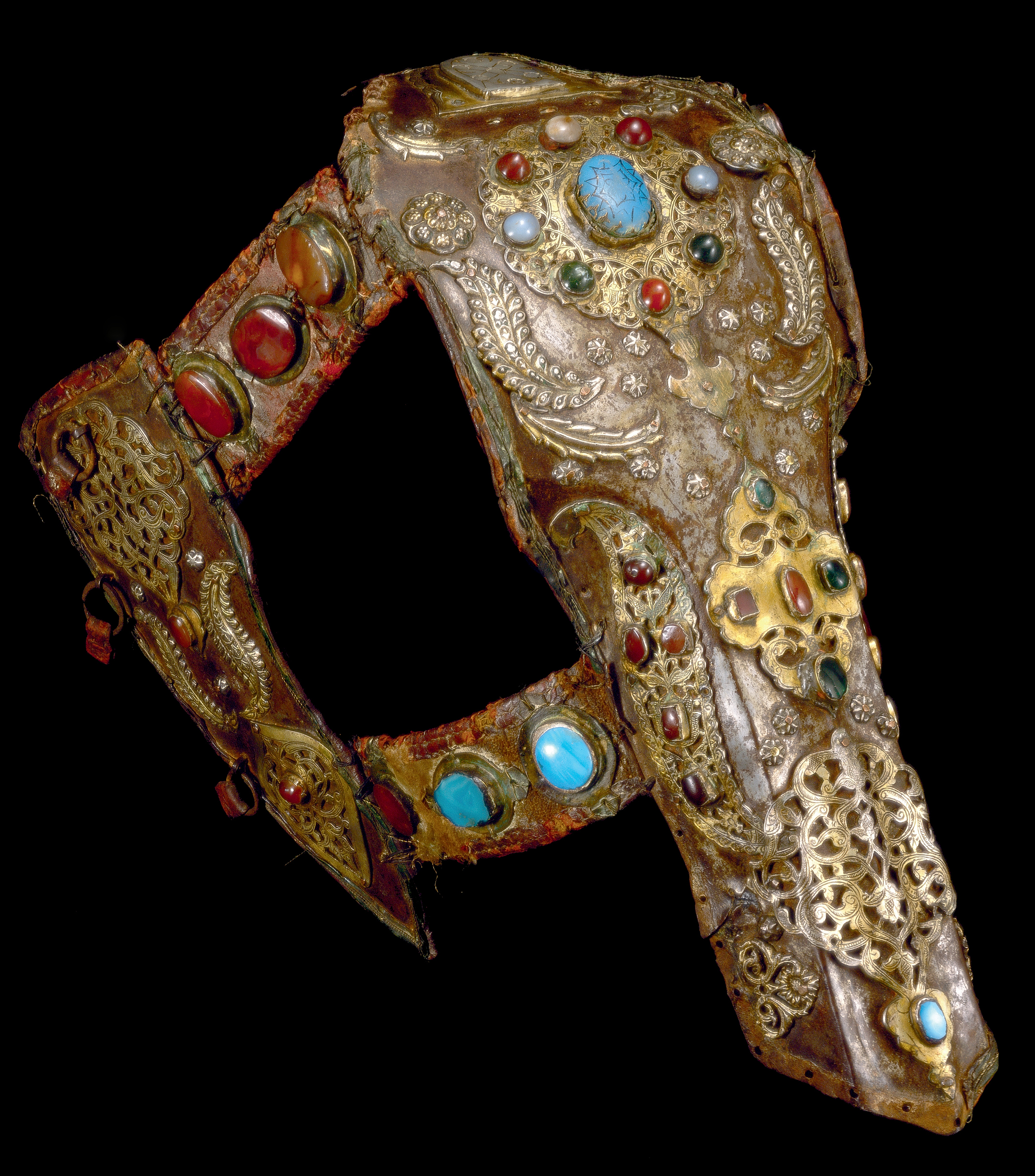
Chamfron (for a horse's face) with cheek-pieces. Ottoman Turkey or Egypt, 18th century

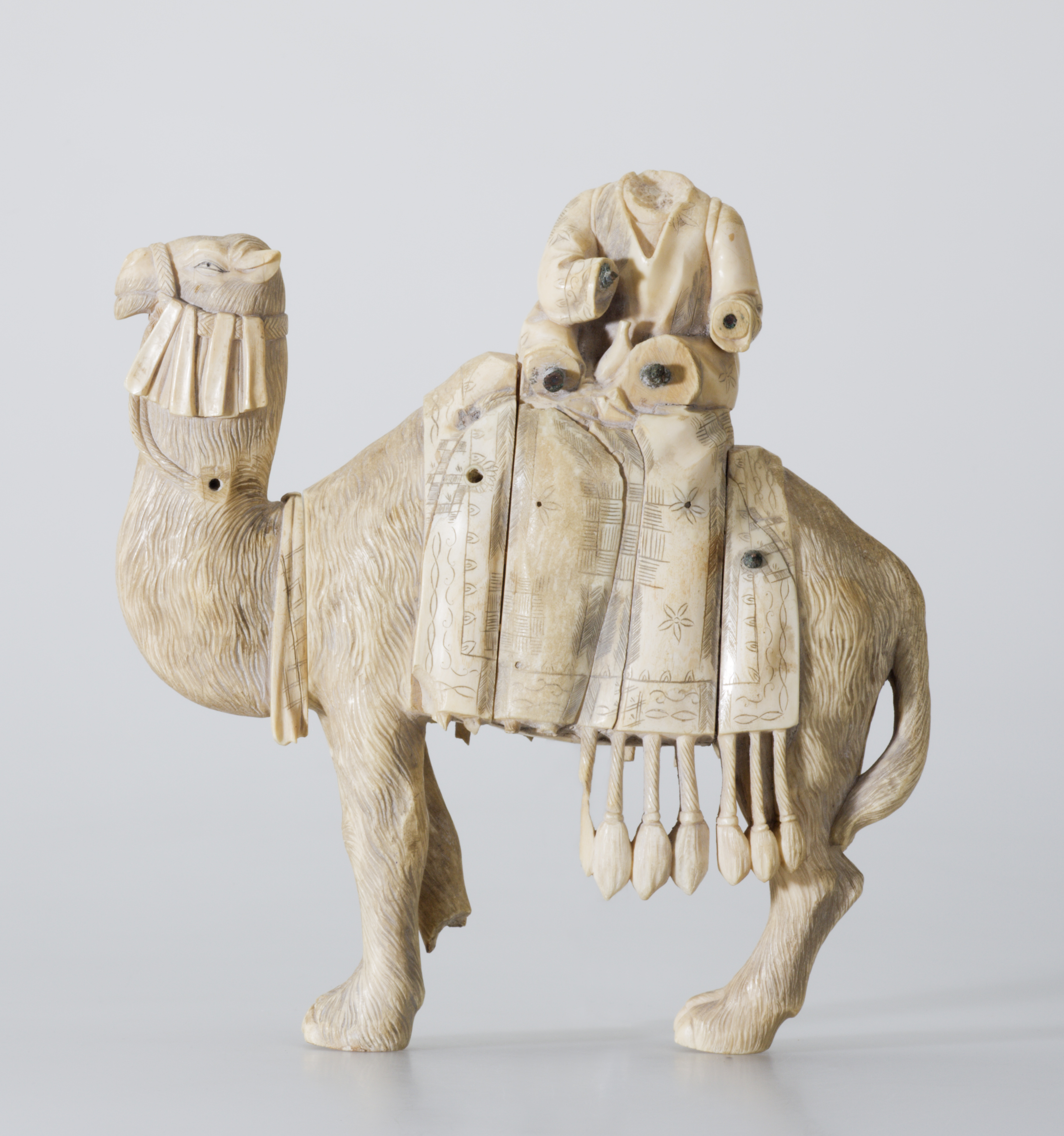
Statuette of a camel and rider, Middle East, 8th–9th century

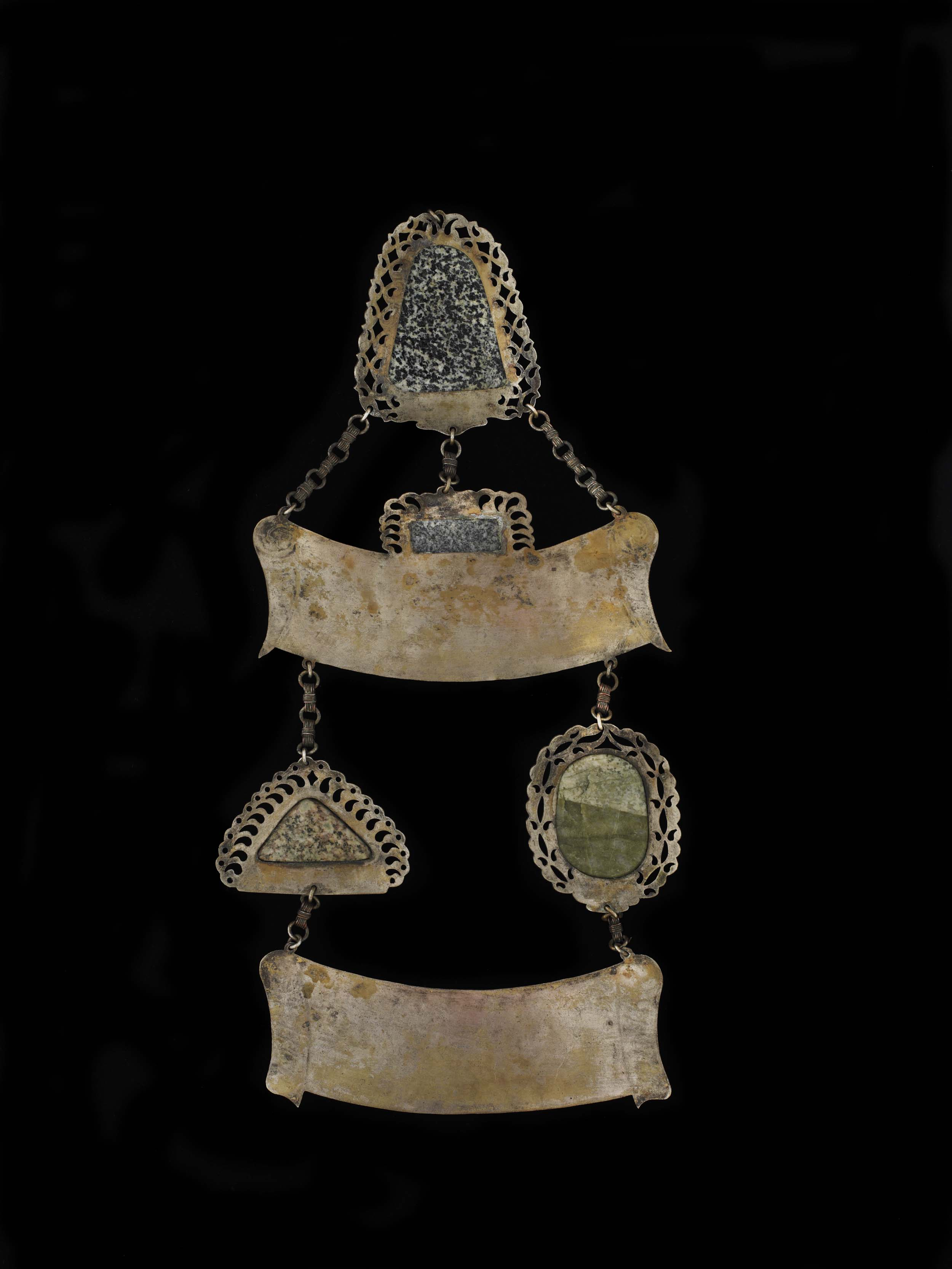
A pendant with rocks from Mecca, Egypt, 20th century

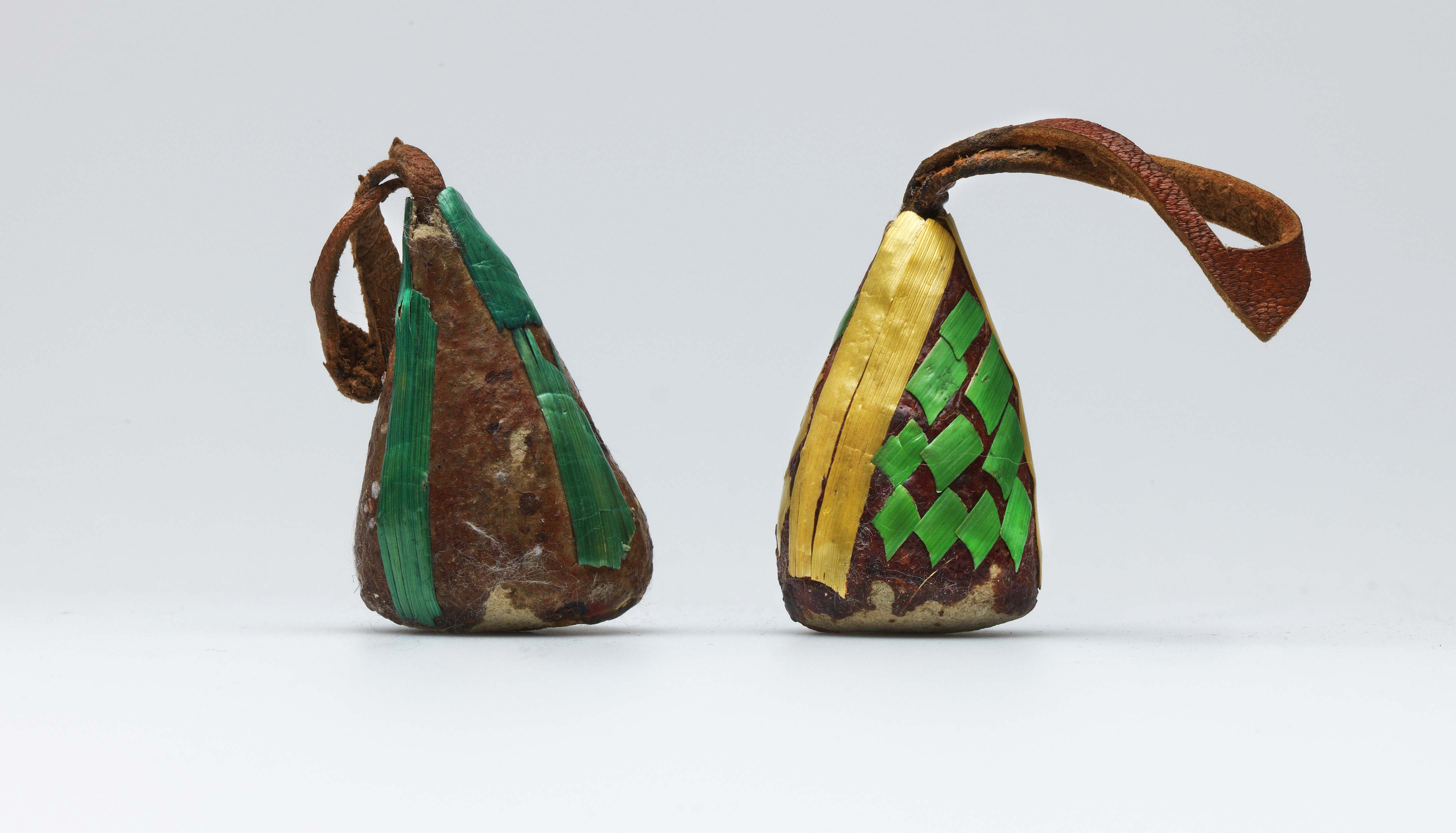
Earth from Ka'bah (Ghubar-i Sherif), Turkey, 19th century

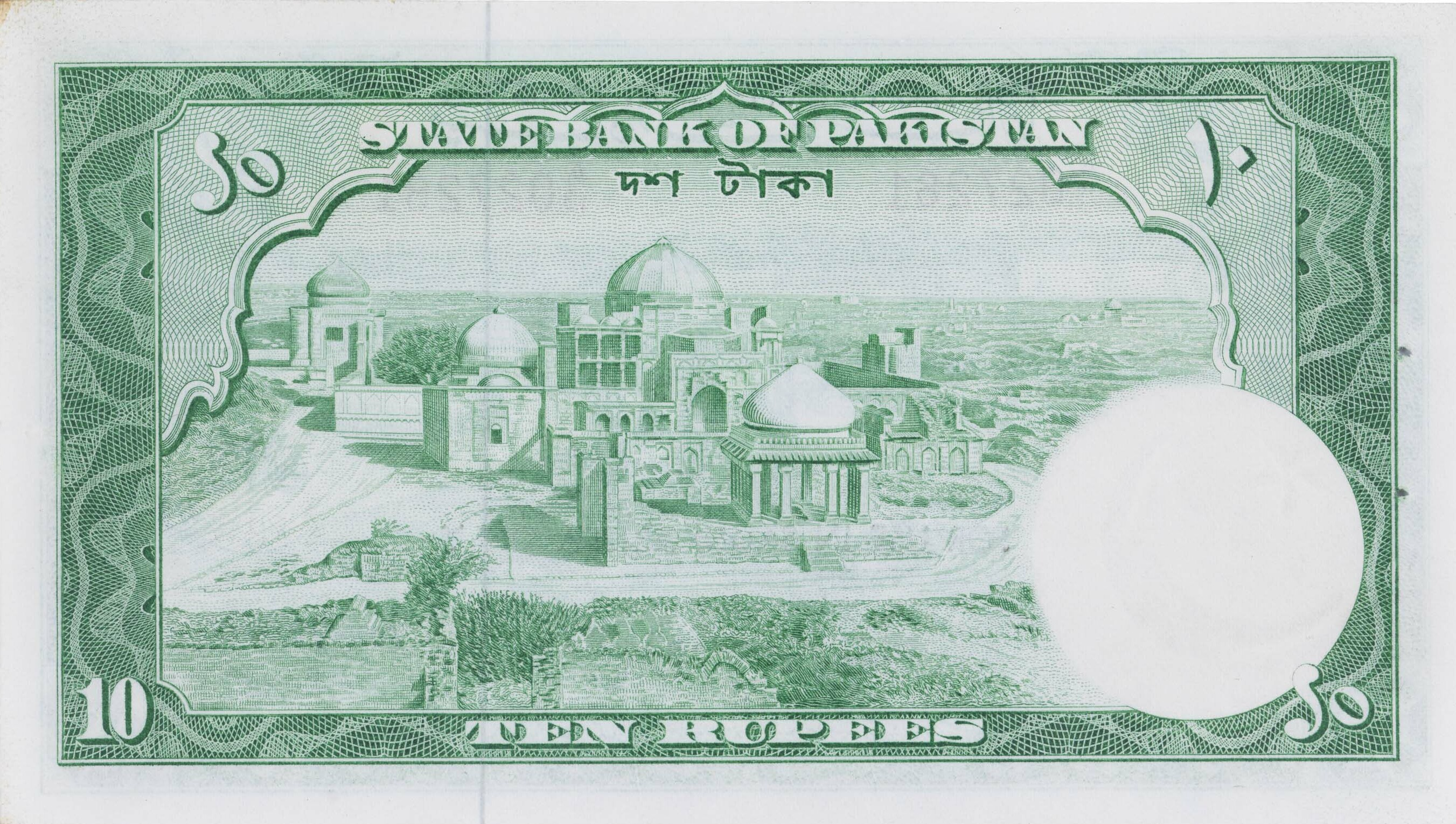
10 Rupee Hajj Banknote

== Publications ==
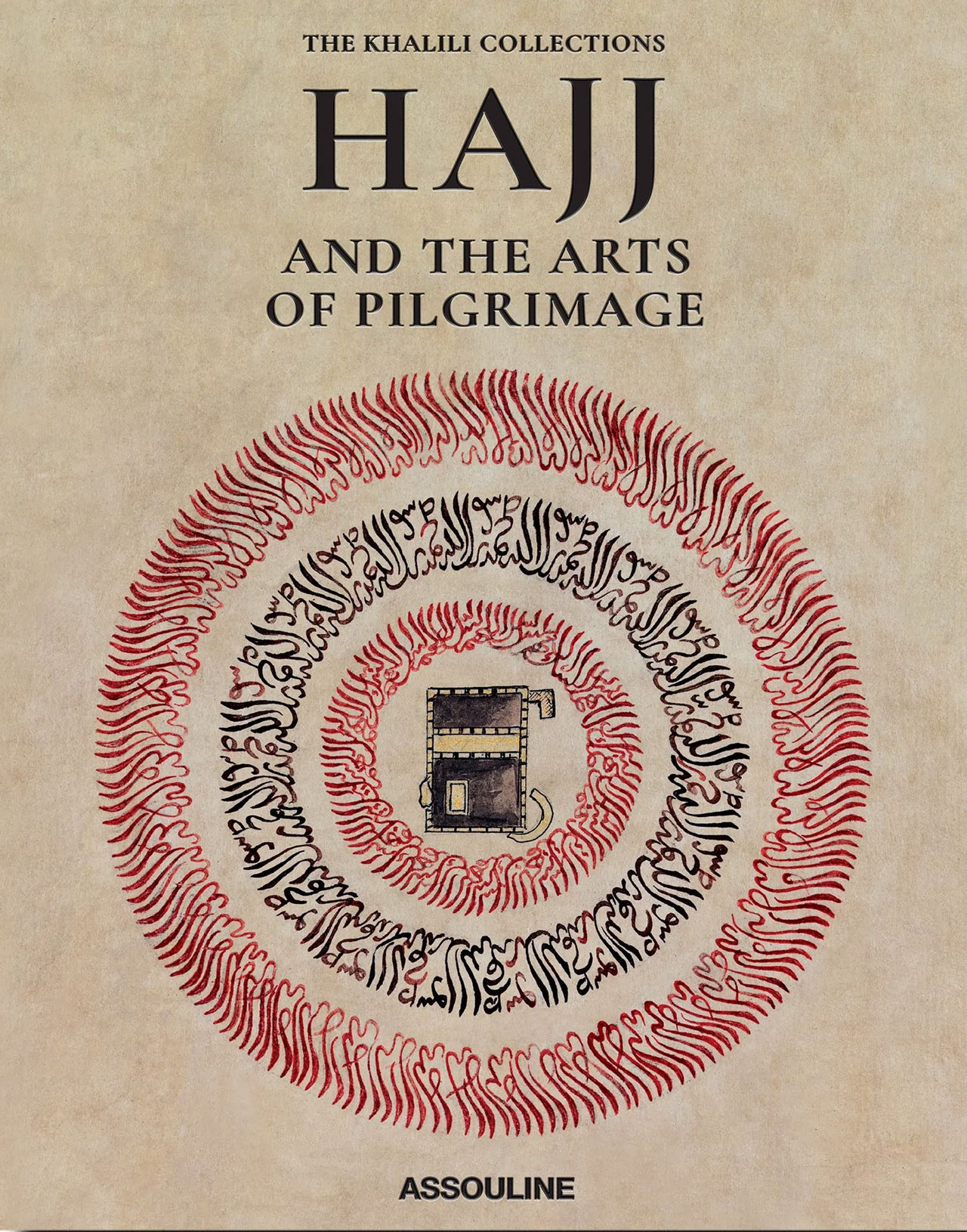
Cover of the 2022 book

A single-volume summary of the collection by Qasira Khan, with 300 illustrations, was published in 2022 by Assouline Publishing. An eleven-volume catalogue is scheduled for future publication.

== Exhibitions ==
The collection is not on permanent public display, but was the largest lender of objects to a 2012 exhibition about the Hajj at the British Museum. Objects have subsequently been lent to exhibitions in other countries.

- January – April 2012: Hajj: Journey to the Heart of Islam, British Museum, London, UK
- March – June 2012: Gifts of the Sultan. The Arts of Giving at the Islamic Courts, Museum of Islamic Art, Doha, Qatar
- September 2013 – March 2014: Longing for Mecca: The Pilgrim’s Journey, Rijksmuseum Volkenkunde, Leiden, the Netherlands (more than 80 items from the collection)
- April – August 2014: Hajj: le pèlerinage à La Mecque, Arab World Institute, Paris, France (40 items from the collection)
- September 2017 – March 2018: Hajj: Memories of a Journey, Sheikh Zayed Grand Mosque, Abu Dhabi, UAE
- February 2019 – January 2020: Longing for Mecca, Tropenmuseum, Amsterdam, the Netherlands

== Digitisation ==
In 2021, a dozen objects in the collection were digitised by Google Arts & Culture, creating gigapixel images. These were combined with the collection's own digital images to produce an online exhibit in which readers can zoom in on very fine details.
