= Hajj: Journey to the Heart of Islam =

2012 exhibition at the British Museum

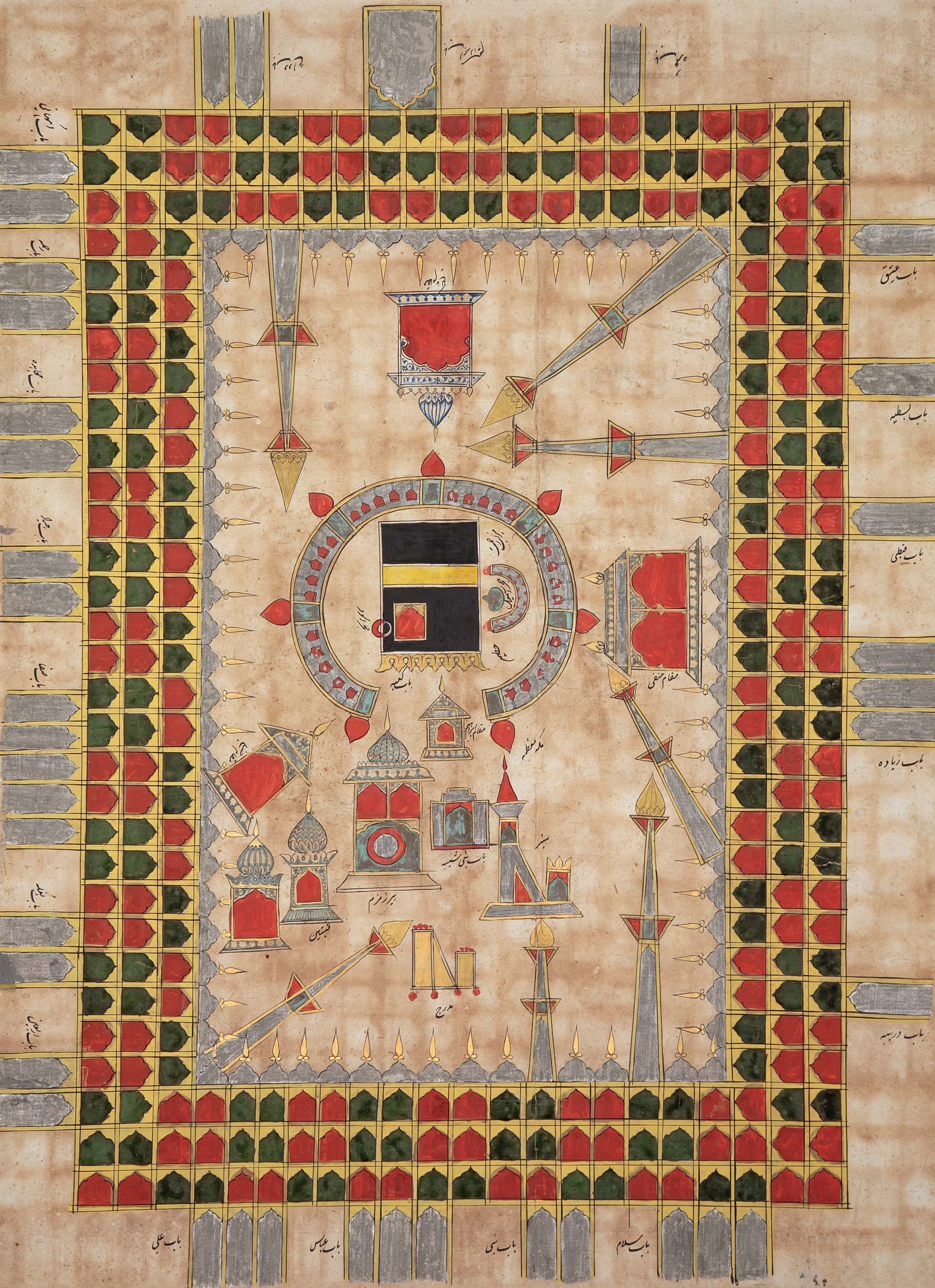
- 17th- or 18th-century Hajj certificate showing the Kaaba within the Masjid al-Haram
- Date: 26 January – 15 April 2012
- Venue: British Museum
- Type: Art exhibition
- Theme: Hajj

Hajj: Journey to the Heart of Islam was an exhibition held at the British Museum in London from 26 January to 15 April 2012. It was the world's first major exhibition telling the story, visually and textually, of the hajj – the pilgrimage to Mecca which is one of the five pillars of Islam. Textiles, manuscripts, historical documents, photographs, and art works from many different countries and eras were displayed to illustrate the themes of travel to Mecca, hajj rituals, and the Kaaba. More than two hundred objects were included, drawn from forty public and private collections in a total of fourteen countries. The largest contributor was David Khalili's family trust, which lent many objects that would later be part of the Khalili Collection of Hajj and the Arts of Pilgrimage.

The exhibition was formally opened by Prince Charles in a ceremony attended by Prince Abdulaziz bin Abdullah, son of King Abdullah, the custodian of the Two Holy Mosques. It was popular both with Muslims and non-Muslims, attracting nearly 120,000 adult visitors and favourable press reviews. This success inspired the Museum of Islamic Art in Doha, the Arab World Institute in Paris, the National Museum of Ethnology in Leiden, and the Tropenmuseum in Amsterdam to stage their own hajj-themed exhibitions with contributions from the Khalili Collection.

An exhibition catalogue with essays about the hajj, edited by Venetia Porter, was published by the British Museum in 2012, along with a shorter illustrated guide to the hajj. An academic conference, linked to the exhibition, resulted in another book about the topic.

== Background: The Hajj ==
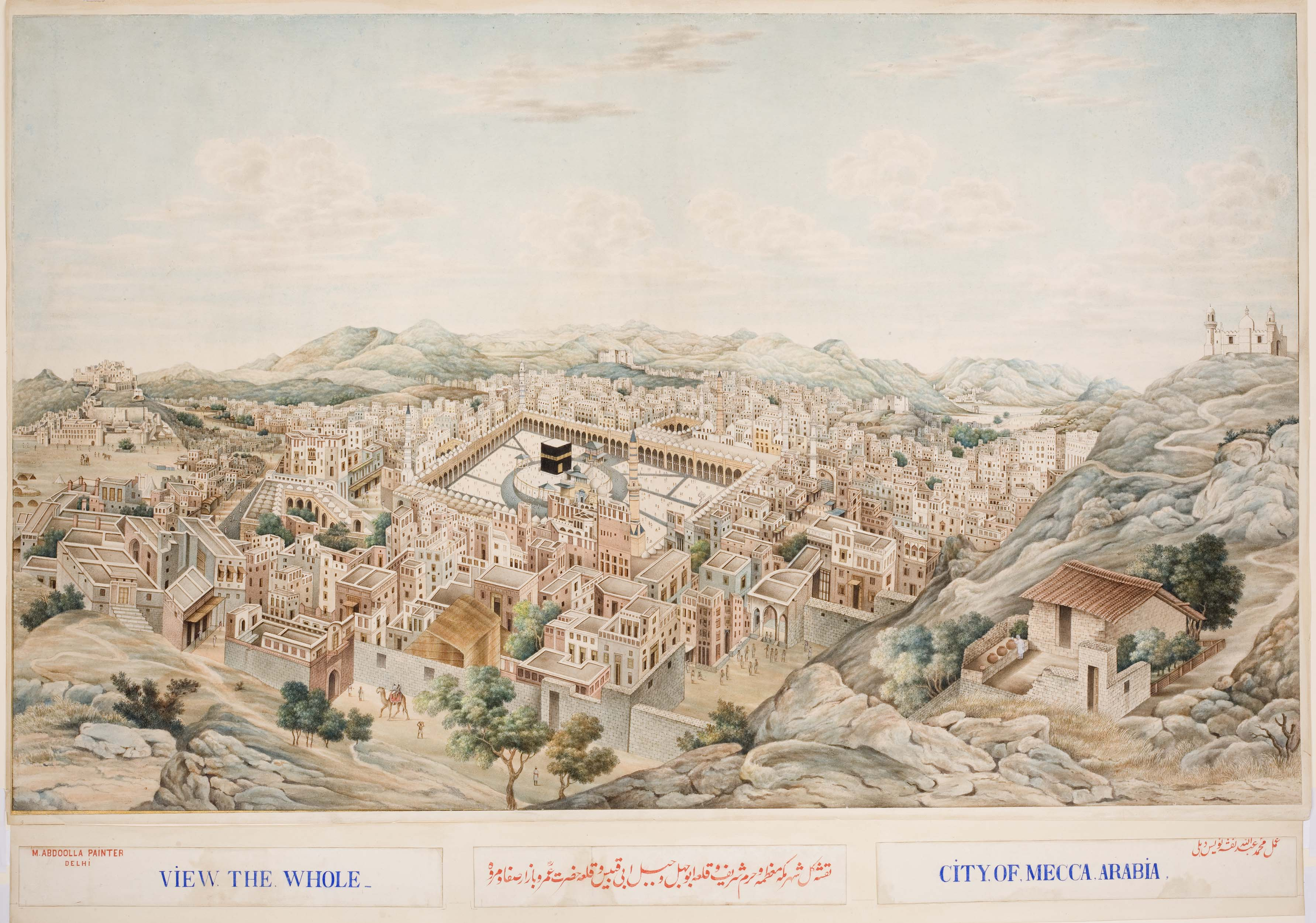
Panorama of Mecca, c. 1845

Neil MacGregor, director of the British Museum: "It would have been impossible to tell this story without those great works of art from David [Khalili]'s collection [...] [T]his exhibition will allow, I hope, a new set of people to understand what hajj is."

The hajj (Arabic: حَجّ) is an annual pilgrimage to the sacred city of Mecca in Saudi Arabia, the holiest city for Muslims. It is a mandatory religious duty that must be carried out at least once in their lifetime by all adult Muslims who are physically and financially capable of undertaking the journey, and can support their family during their absence. At the time of the exhibition, the journey was being made by three million pilgrims each year.

The hajj is one of the five pillars of Islam, along with shahadah (confession of faith), salat (prayer), zakat (charity), and sawm (fasting). It is a demonstration of the solidarity of the Muslim people, and their submission to God (Allah). The word "hajj" means "to attend a journey", which connotes both the outward act of a journey and the inward act of intentions. In the centre of the Masjid al-Haram mosque in Mecca is the Kaaba, a black cubic building known in Islam as the House of God. A hajj consists of several distinct rituals including the tawaf (procession seven times anticlockwise round the Kaaba), wuquf (a vigil at Mount Arafat where Mohammed is said to have preached his last sermon), and ramy al-jamarāt (stoning of the Devil). Of the five pillars, the hajj is the only one not open to non-Muslims, since Mecca is restricted to Muslims only. Over the centuries, the hajj and its destination the Kaaba have inspired creative works in many media, including literature, folk art, and photography.

== Preparation and launch ==
There had been no previous major exhibitions devoted to the hajj. The British Museum's planning for its exhibition spanned a two-year period. This included research projects funded by the Arts and Humanities Research Council. The lead curator was Venetia Porter and the project curator was Qaisra Khan, both staff of the British Museum. Curators negotiated for public and private collections to loan objects for display; forty collections from fourteen countries contributed more than two hundred objects. The largest contributor was David Khalili's family trust. Preparation for the event included promotion to Muslim communities. Khan collected photographs, recordings, and souvenirs during her own hajj in 2010, and assisted with community outreach.

The exhibition was presented in partnership with the King Abdulaziz Public Library and with the support of HSBC Amanah. Prince Charles gave a speech to formally open the exhibition on 26 January 2012. Prince Abdulaziz bin Abdullah travelled from Saudi Arabia to represent his father, the custodian of the Two Holy Mosques, at this opening ceremony.

== Content ==
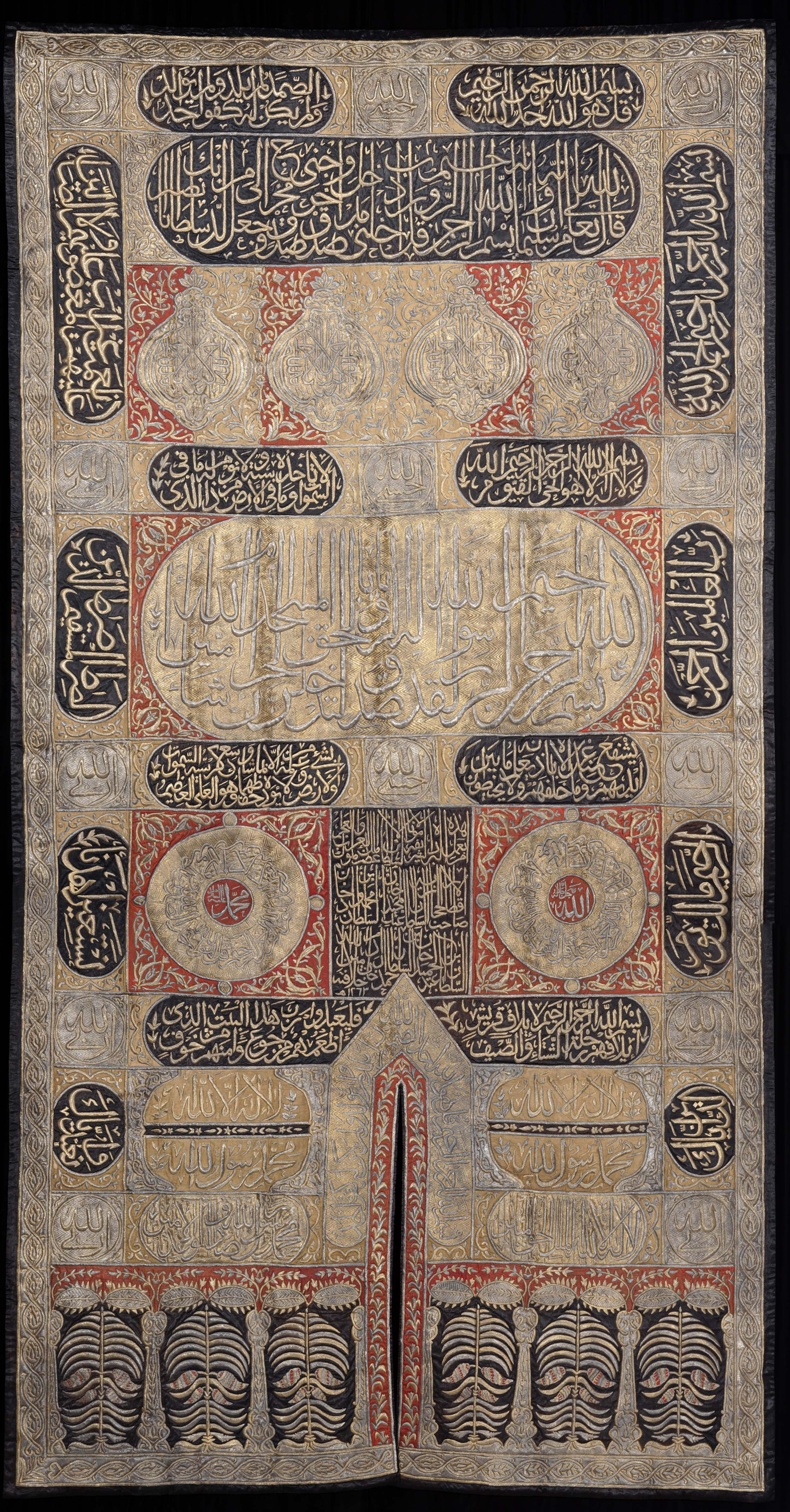
Sitara for the door of the Kaaba, 1263 AH (1846–1847 AD)

The exhibition was held in the circular British Museum Reading Room. To set the mood, visitors entered through a narrow passage where audio recordings of an adhan (call to prayer) were played. The displays were arranged to draw visitors around the circular space, mimicking the tawaf: the anticlockwise walk around the Kaaba that is a core ritual of the hajj. An early section illustrated the preparations traditionally taken before a hajj, which can include settling debts and preparing a will. Before trains and air travel, a hajj pilgrimage could take many months and involve a significant risk of death either from transmissible disease or bandits. Also displayed in this section were examples of ihram clothing: white clothes that mark the spiritual purpose and collective unity of hajj pilgrims.

The bulk of the content was organised around three themes: pilgrimage routes, the rituals of the hajj, and Mecca. The first section described five different pilgrimage routes towards Mecca: the traditional routes through Arabia, North Africa, the Ottoman Empire, and Asia, plus the modern route by air from Britain. It thus contrasted the early pilgrims' arduous, risky journey across desert or ocean with the ease of modern travel.

Pilgrimages of past centuries were illustrated by manuscripts of hajj-related literature, including the Anis Al-Hujjaj, the Dala'il al-Khayrat, the Shahnameh, the Futuh al-Haramayn, and the Jami' al-tawarikh. Mansa Musa, king of the Mali Empire, travelled to Mecca in 1324 with 60,000 courtiers as atonement for accidentally killing his mother; he was depicted in a panel from a 14th-century Catalan Atlas. The importance of Mecca to Muslims was illustrated by these ancient maps and diagrams as well as by qibla compasses which help devotees turn towards the city, which they are required to do for prayer.

The stories of individual historical pilgrims were told through diaries and photographs. These included Westerners such as the explorer Richard Francis Burton (a non-Muslim who made the trip in disguise in 1853), intelligence officer Harry St John Philby, and aristocrat Lady Evelyn Cobbold. Philby took part in cleaning the Kaaba on his trip, and the brush and cloth he used were included in the exhibition. Also displayed was the Bugis-language diary of Ahmad as-Salih La Tenritappu, King of Bone, which records requests for travel permits as well as reports on the departures and returns of Hajj pilgrims from what is now part of Indonesia. Other texts included a travelogue by the 19th-century Chinese scholar Ma Fuchu and a 13th-century manuscript of the Maqamat al-Hariri story collection. One of the earliest surviving Qurans was on display: an 8th-century manuscript lacking the decorative calligraphy associated with later versions.

A seven-minute video illustrated the rituals of the hajj. The rituals section also displayed textiles from the holy sites, including sections from kiswahs (ornate textile coverings that had decorated the Kaaba), sitaras (ornamental curtains) from other holy sites and a mahmal (ceremonial litter conveyed by camel from Cairo to Mecca with the pilgrim caravan). Some exhibits were personal items that pilgrims brought or acquired on their journey. These included prayer beads, travel tickets, and flasks for drinking water from the Zamzam Well. Also displayed were hajj certificates, showing that a hajj has been completed, often with illustrations of holy sites. Hajj banknotes can be bought before the journey and exchanged for Saudi currency, protecting the pilgrim from exchange rate fluctuations.

The section on Mecca used past and present photographs and paintings to show how the mosque surrounding the Kaaba (the Masjid al-Haram) has been modernised to make space for much larger numbers of pilgrims, resulting in some ancient buildings being demolished. The 19th-century photographs included some by Muhammad Sadiq of holy sites in Mecca and Christiaan Snouck Hurgronje's portraits of pilgrims.

Towards the end of the exhibition were several pieces of contemporary art, including works by Ahmed Mater, Idris Khan, Walid Siti, Kader Attia, Ayman Yossri, and Abdulnasser Gharem. A final section played audio testimonies of British hajj pilgrims and invited guests to write down their own reflections.

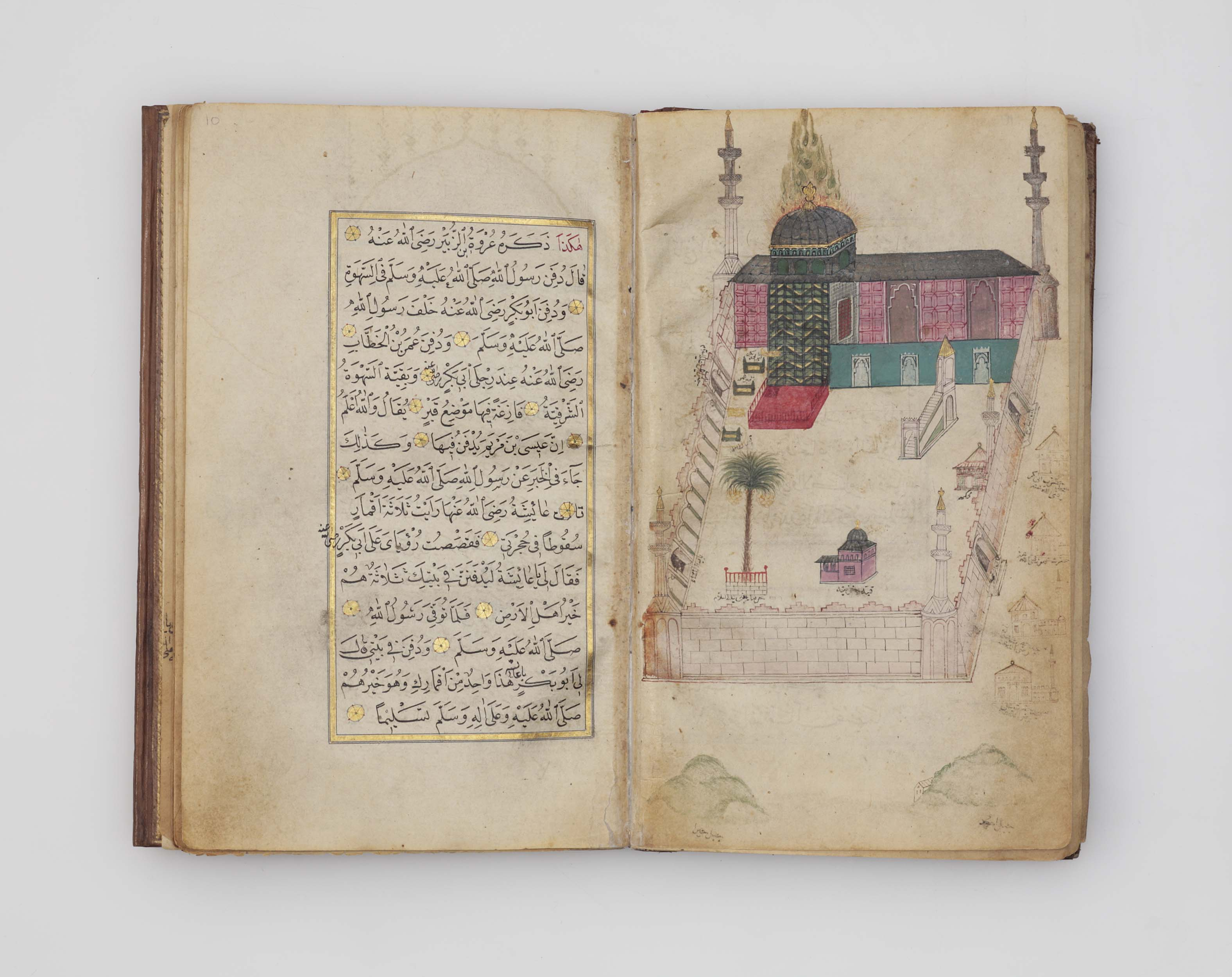
Illustration of the Prophet's Mosque in Medina from the Dala'il al-Khayrat, late 17th or 18th century

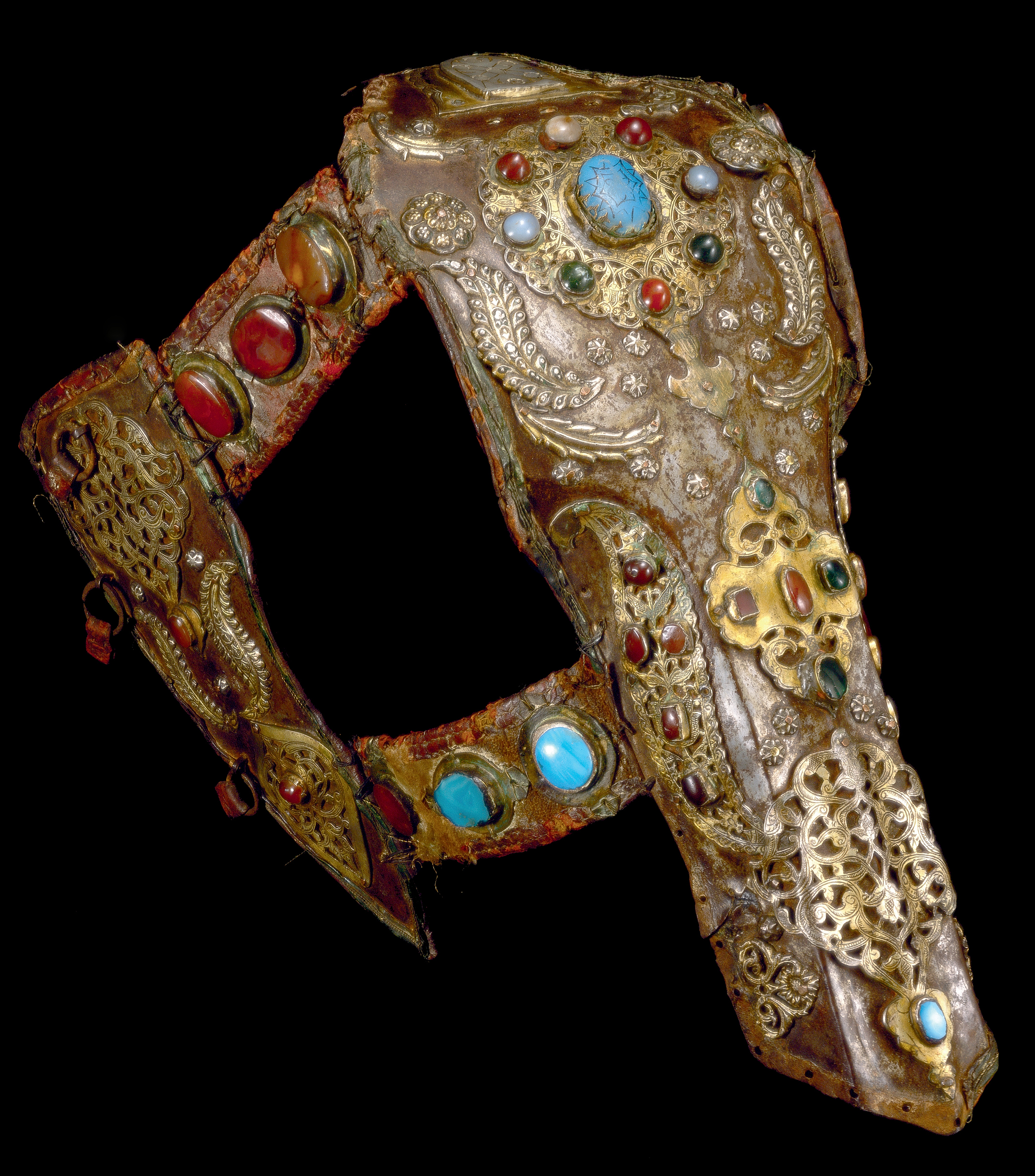
Chamfron for a horse, Ottoman Empire, 18th century

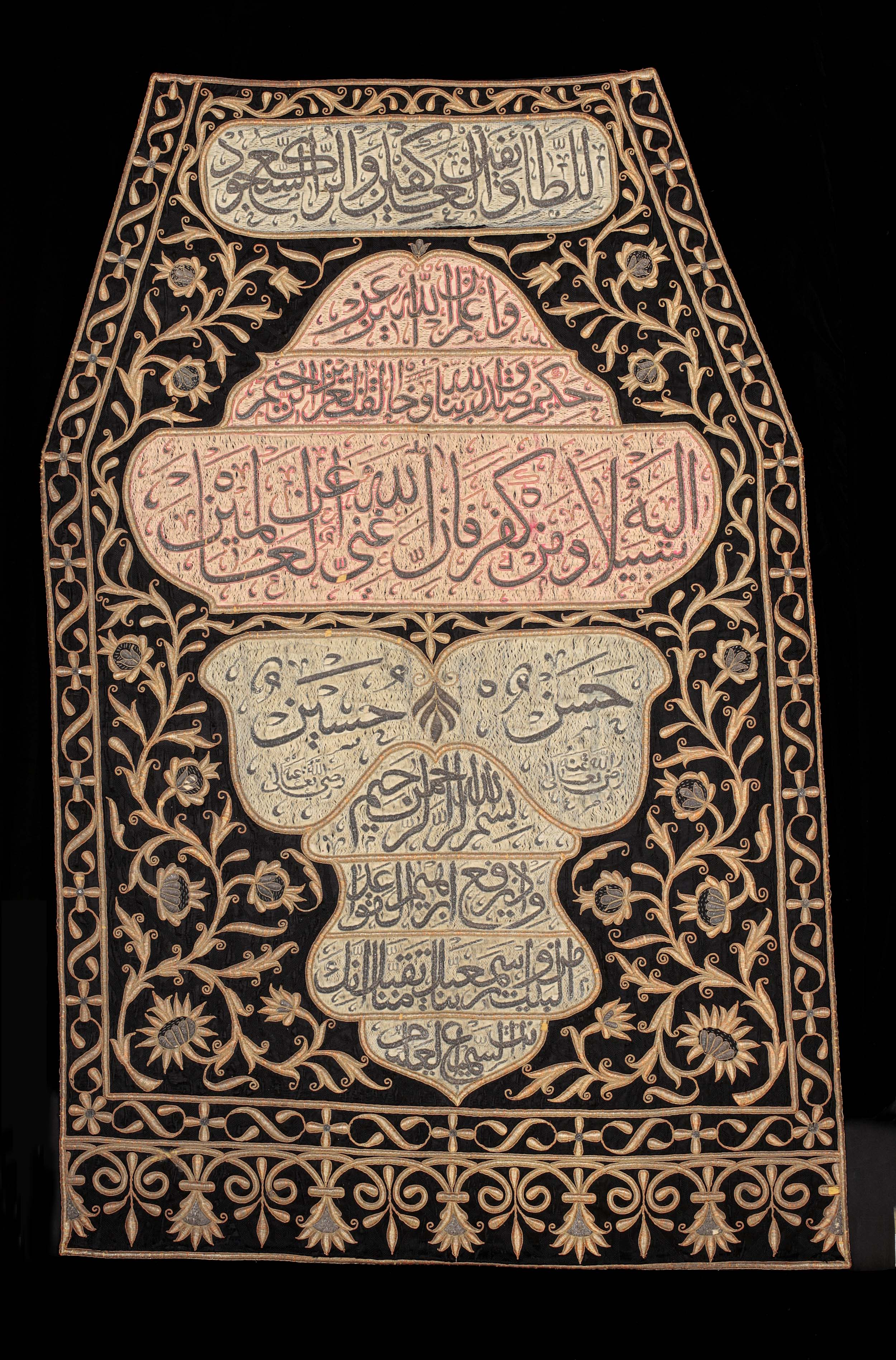
Section from the kiswah of the Maqam Ibrahim, Cairo, 19th century

== Reception and legacy ==
The museum's target of 80,000 visitors was quickly exceeded. By the end of the run, 119,948 adult tickets had been sold (children had free entry and were not counted). According to the British Museum's annual report, educational events connected to the exhibition attracted nearly 32,000 participants. Forty-seven percent of visitors were Muslims. Some non-Muslim visitors reported that overhearing Muslim families' conversations or striking up conversations with them, helped them appreciate the spiritual importance of the hajj.

In surveys, 89% of attendees reported emotional or spiritual reactions such as reflection on faith. Steph Berns, a doctoral researcher at the University of Kent, interviewed attendees and found a small minority for whom contemplating the artefacts or personal testimonies induced a sense of closeness to God. The aspects of the exhibition most often remarked on by visitors were the personal accounts of hajj pilgrims in the video, photographs, and textual diaries. The artifacts that attracted the most visitor comments were the textiles and contemporary art pieces. Berns observed that, for most visitors, the exhibition could not fully reproduce the personal and emotional experience of the hajj, which is crucially connected to the specific location of Mecca. She described this as an unavoidable result of presenting the topic within a museum thousands of miles away.

In The Guardian, Jonathan Jones wrote "This is one of the most brilliant exhibitions the British Museum has put on", awarding it five stars out of five. He described its celebration of Islam as "challenging" to non-Muslim Westerners used to negative portrayal of the religion. The Londonist praised an "eye-opening and fascinating" exhibition that demystified an aspect of Islam poorly understood by most of the public. Brian Sewell in the Evening Standard described the exhibition as "of profound cultural importance", praising it as an example of "what multiculturalism should be – information, instruction and understanding, academically rigorous, leaving both cultures (the enquiring and the enquired) intact". For The Diplomat, Amy Foulds described the first part of the exhibition as very interesting but felt that the section about Mecca was anti-climactic, though somewhat redeemed by the contemporary art pieces. Reviewing for The Arts Desk, Fisun Guner awarded four out of five stars to "an exhibition about faith that even an avowed atheist might find rather moving [...] as we read and listen to the words of believers experiencing what must be seen for them not only as an encounter with God but a deep sense of connection with fellow Muslims". Arifa Akbar, who went on hajj in 2006, wrote in The Independent of it being "utterly refreshing" to see a focus on personal experiences of the hajj rather than the politics of Islam and the way it is perceived by non-Muslims. She observed that a museum visit is unavoidably dry compared to the intense experience of joining the throng around the Kaaba, but praised the curators' originality and courage in tackling the subject. For Akbar, the highlights included the eighth-century Quran and a sitara. Also in The Independent, Jenny Gilbert found the logistical details of travel – a "dry" topic for those not already interested in manuscript maps – less appealing than the colourful accounts of historical and modern pilgrims.

The journalist and broadcaster Sarfraz Manzoor took his 78-year-old mother to the exhibition since she had long wanted to perform the hajj but was too infirm to make the trip. He contrasted his mother's joyous reaction against his own mixed feelings on the subject matter as a British Muslim. "And yet", he wrote, "the exhibition does illuminate the magnetic appeal of the hajj – of knowing that hundreds of millions have visited the site and completed the same rituals." The scholar of religion Karen Armstrong recommended the exhibition as an antidote to Western stereotypes of Islam that focus on violence and extremism. She described it as an insight into how the vast majority of Muslims view and practise their religion. For the Sunday Times art critic Waldemar Januszczak, an exhibition on a topic for which there is relatively little visual material was "heroic" and showed a determination to help visitors understand the world. He drew a parallel with exhibitions of conceptual art; since texts rather than visual art played a crucial role, "so much of the extraordinary story line laid out for us [...] takes place in the mind". Among the visual art, he singled out the textiles as providing "a visceral artistic buzz to the display".

In Newsweek, Jason Goodwin said the exhibition fulfilled the British Museum's purpose of "explain[ing] the world to itself" but said that Saudi influence resulted in "a palpable air of self-congratulation and a tendency to soft-pedal the role of the Ottoman Turks in maintaining the major hajj routes across their empire from the 16th to the 20th centuries." Nick Cohen, in an Observer piece accusing British cultural institutions of "selling their souls" to dictatorships, criticised the exhibition for ignoring aspects of the hajj documented by historians of Islam. He speculated that topics had been excluded so as not to offend the Saudi royal family, including deaths at the hajj (by violence or by incompetent crowd control) and the destruction of buildings in Mecca where Mohammad and his family had lived. The museum responded that the Saudi royal family had not funded the exhibition and had no curatorial control. Jonathan Jones responded to Cohen, defending the five-star review he had given. For Jones, the exhibition was driven not by political or theological goals but by a genuine enthusiasm for the beauty and significance of Islamic culture. That some exhibits had come from Saudi Arabia was, in his view, not significant.

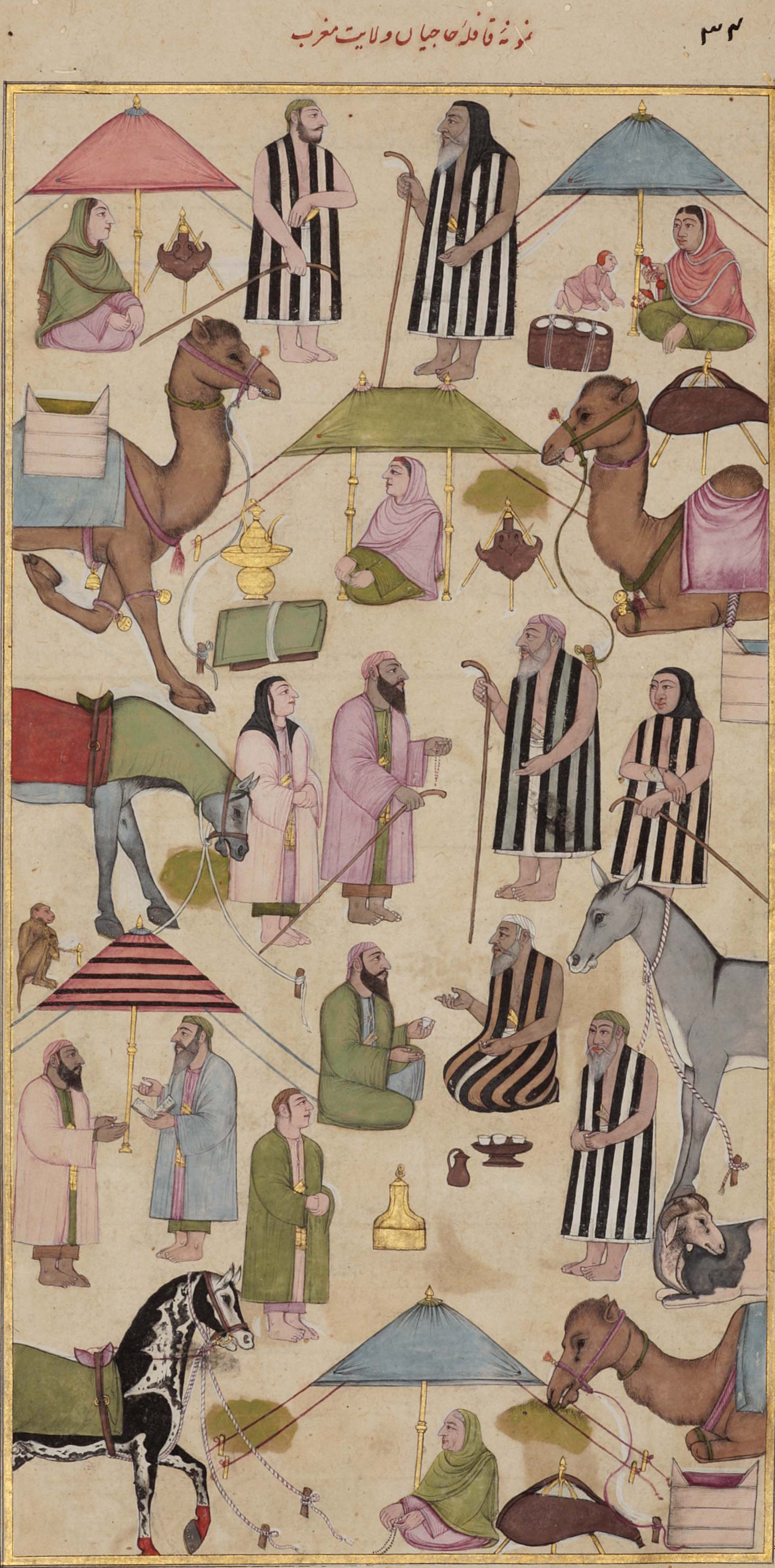
Illustration of a North African pilgrim caravan from the Anis Al-Hujjaj, 17th century

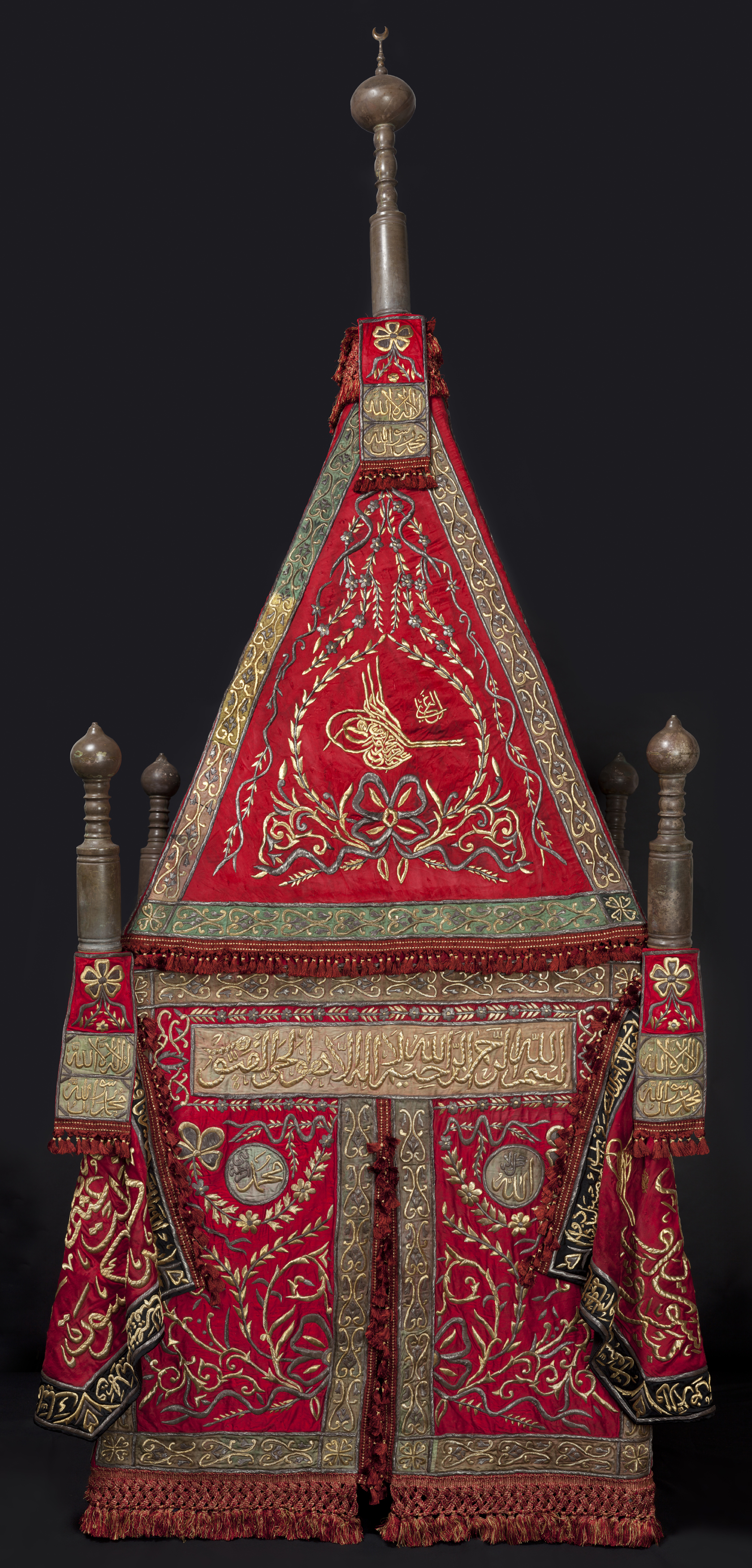
Mahmal cover in red silk, late 19th century

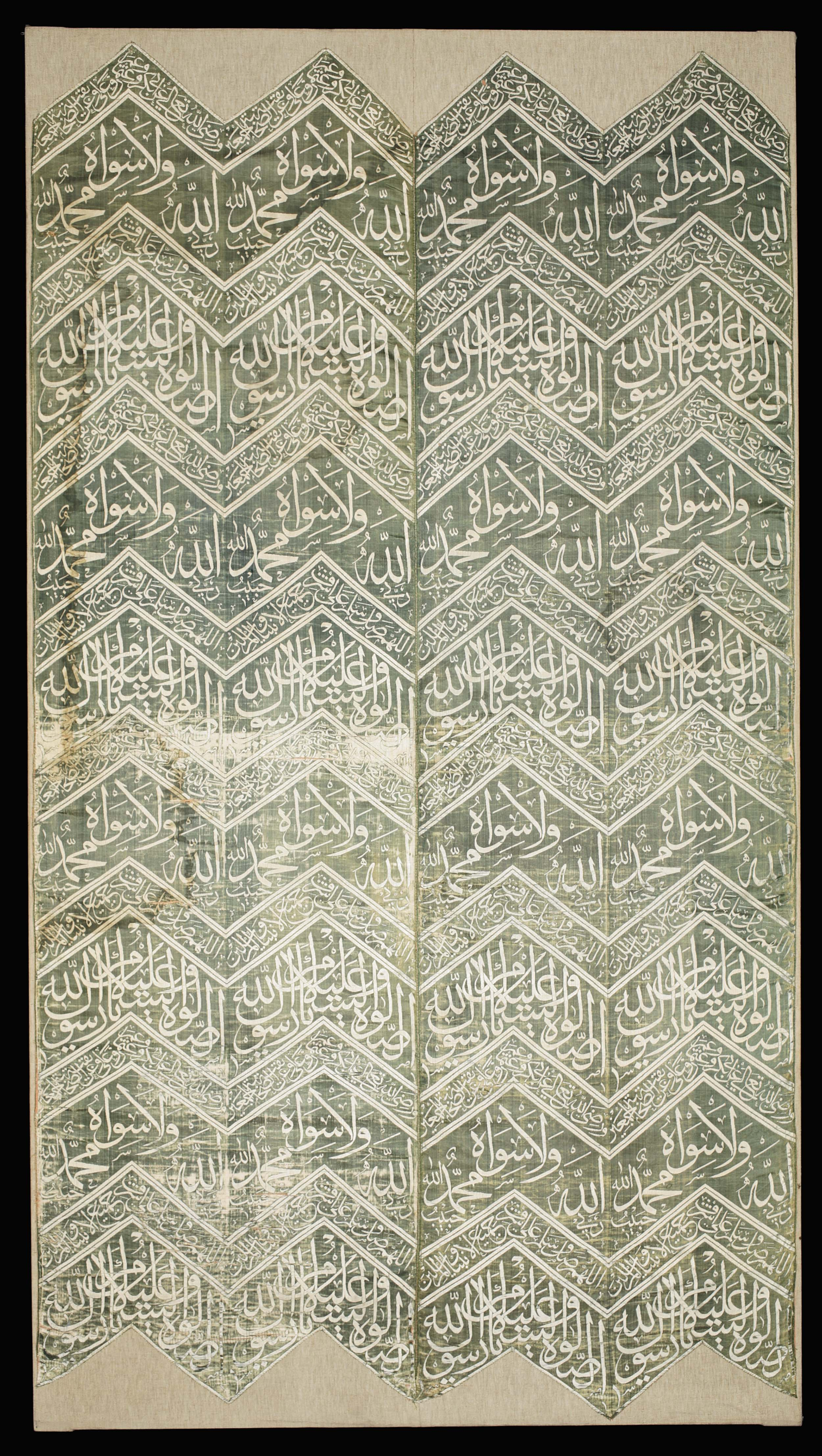
Section from the curtain of the prophet's tomb, 18th century

=== Publications ===
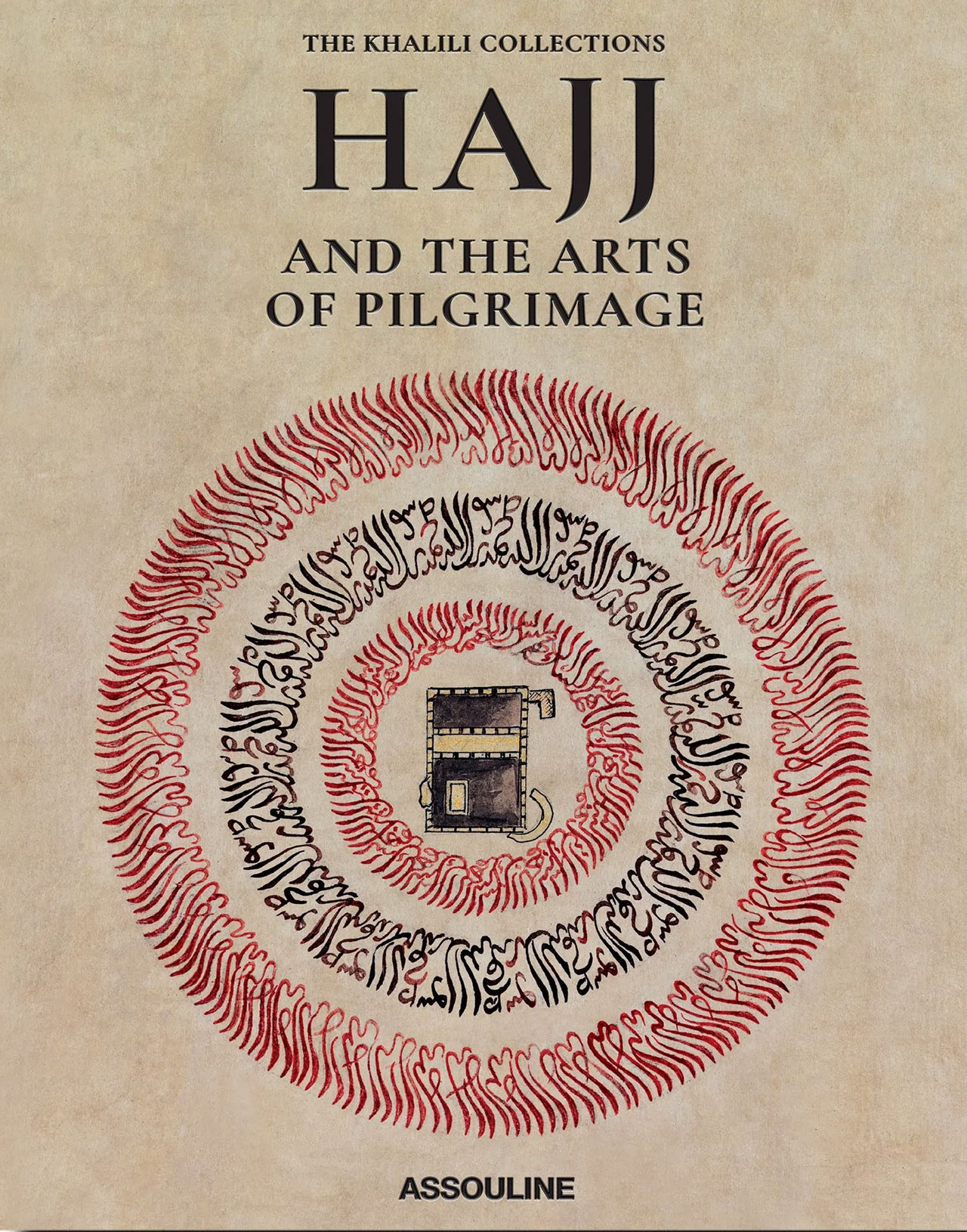
Cover of the 2022 book

Two books resulted directly from the exhibition, both edited by Venetia Porter. Hajj: Journey to the Heart of Islam is an exhibition catalogue that also includes interdisciplinary essays explaining the history, culture, and religious significance of the hajj. The authors include Karen Armstrong, Muhammad Abdel-Haleem, Hugh N. Kennedy, Robert Irwin, and Ziauddin Sardar. The Art of Hajj is a shorter book describing Mecca, Medina, and the rituals of the hajj with visual examples. Qamar Adamjee, a curator at the Asian Art Museum in San Francisco, described both books as accessible to a broad audience while covering many different aspects of the subject.

An academic conference was held in conjunction with the exhibition from 22 to 24 March. Its proceedings, including thirty papers on different aspects of the hajj, were published by the British Museum in 2013 as The Hajj: Collected Essays, edited by Venetia Porter and Liana Saif.

The Khalili Collection of Hajj and the Arts of Pilgrimage subsequently expanded into a five-thousand-object collection documenting the Islamic holy sites of Mecca and Medina. In 2022 it was published in a single illustrated volume by Qaisra Khan, who had co-curated the London exhibition and had become the curator of Hajj and the Arts and Pilgrimage at the Khalili Collections. An eleven-volume catalogue is scheduled for publication in 2023.

=== Related exhibitions ===
The success of Hajj: Journey to the Heart of Islam prompted museums and art institutions in other countries to inquire about hosting hajj-themed exhibitions. It was not possible for the London exhibition to go on tour; it had involved special loans from 40 different sources, arranged by years of negotiation. Instead, these institutions created exhibitions on the theme of the hajj using items loaned by the Khalili Collection, among other collections. These included the Museum of Islamic Art in Doha and the Arab World Institute in Paris. The Doha exhibition was titled Hajj: The Journey Through Art and drew most of its content from Qatari art collections. Since France has many North African immigrants, the Paris exhibition focused on hajj routes from North Africa. A Dutch exhibition titled Longing for Mecca: The Pilgrim's Journey was held in 2013 at the National Museum of Ethnology in Leiden and in an expanded version at the Tropenmuseum in Amsterdam from January 2019 to February 2020. This combined objects from Dutch collections with the Khalili Collection objects that had been exhibited in London.

== See also ==
- History of the Hajj
