= Greenbox Museum =

Musuem in the Netherlands

Coordinates: 52.2885°N 4.6789°E

Greenbox Museum of Contemporary Art from Saudi Arabia
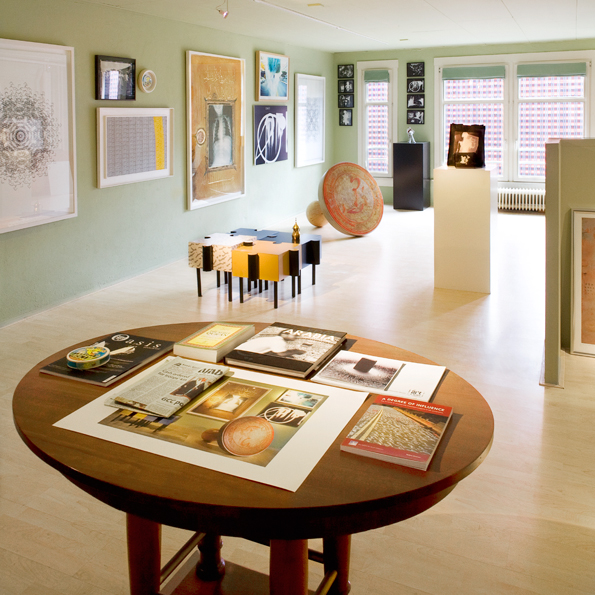
- The museum in 2008
- Established: 2008
- Location: Hoofddorp, The Netherlands
- Type: Art Museum
- Founder: Aarnout Helb
- Website: https://greenboxmuseum.com/

The Greenbox Museum, officially known as the Greenbox Museum of Contemporary Art from Saudi Arabia, was a museum in Amsterdam from 2008 to 2021. Since 2021, the museum has been located in Hoofddorp, where it is open by appointment. As a museum, Greenbox focuses primarily on research, collection building, and keeping that collection accessible to the public. The museum has the collection on long-term loan from its founder.

== Background ==
Since 2008, the museum has focused on the work of visual artists who live and work in Saudi Arabia. The museum is modest in size, reminiscent of an 18th-century cabinet of curiosities. In response to the so-called white cube gallery (a sleek, usually square or rectangular exhibition space with white walls and concrete floors), the Greenbox Museum's space is painted entirely green. The color of the museum is not a reference to the Saudi flag or the color of Islam, but a personal preference of the founder.

In 2012, the museum attracted the attention of the international publication The Art Newspaper after exhibiting works by Abdulnasser Gharem. These works had previously been banned from the Edge of Arabia exhibition at the London School of Oriental and African Studies under pressure from Saudi diplomats.

The original museum covered only 70m² and was located on the fifth floor of a warehouse near Leidseplein. Because it was bursting at the seams, a new home was sought. In 2021, the museum moved to Hoofddorp, where it can be visited by appointment.

The Fonāna exhibition, initiated by FOAM, was made possible in 2023 thanks to loans from the Greenbox Museum. With nearly a million followers on Facebook, the Greenbox Museum is the most popular Dutch museum. This large number can be explained by the fact that Saudi Arabia itself does not have a museum for its art; many of the likes therefore do not come from the Netherlands.
