= Edge of Arabia =

- Formation: 2003
- Headquarters: London
- Location: United Kingdom
- Director: Stephen Stapleton
- Website: http://edgeofarabia.com

Edge of Arabia is an arts organization for the appreciation of contemporary Arab art and culture with a focus on Saudi Arabia.

== History ==
The initiative was born from a chance encounter in 2003 between British artist, Stephen Stapleton, and Saudi artists, Ahmed Mater and Abdulnasser Gharem, at the Al Meftaha Arts Village in Abha, Saudi Arabia.

In January 2013 it opened a permanent space including a gallery and library in Battersea, London, before moving to central London in 2016.

== World Tour ==
Edge of Arabia officially launched with a major exhibition showcasing 17 artists from Saudi Arabia at London's Brunei Gallery in October 2008. In just over two months the organizers saw more than 13,000 visitors, breaking the record for attendance at the University of London's largest gallery.

In June 2009, Edge of Arabia travelled to the 53rd Venice Biennale to the Palazzo Contarini Polignac, featuring the work of eight Saudi contemporary artists, and continued its world tour with an exhibition entitled Grey Borders/Grey Frontiers in Berlin, its TRANSiTION exhibition in Istanbul, both in 2010, and TERMINAL coinciding with Art Dubai in March 2011.

As a collateral Venice Biennale event in 2011, the grassroots initiative further broadened its outreach to produce the first pan-Arab exhibition of contemporary art as part of the 54th Venice Art Biennale: The Future of A Promise.

With its first public show inside the Kingdom of Saudi Arabia, in January 2012 Edge of Arabia celebrated its home-coming in an unfinished shopping mall at the Al Furusia Marina with an exhibition entitled Edge of Arabia Jeddah: We Need To Talk. To continue engaging local school and university students in contemporary art from across the region, Edge of Arabia's accompanying art education programme included an art symposium, a dedicated education room with workshop, presentation and research facilities for visitors, guided tours of the exhibition, and practical workshops with participating artists.

On 6 October 2012, Edge of Arabia opened the exhibition titled #COMETOGETHER, showcasing large-scale, multi-media work by over 30 leading Arab and Islamic World artists in a warehouse on Brick Lane. During its three-week duration, the exhibition together with its side programme of educational events including workshops, talks and film screenings attracted over 10,000 visitors.
