= Stephen Stapleton =

British artist (born 1976)

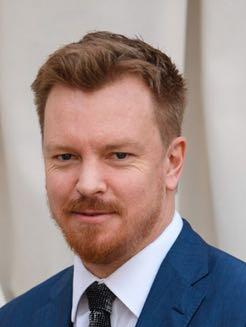
- Stephen Stapleton (2018)
- Born: March 24, 1976 (age 50); Aylesbury, United Kingdom
- Education: Radley College; University of Brighton; University of London
- Occupation: Entrepreneur

Stephen Stapleton (born 1976) is an artist, social entrepreneur, and founding director of Edge of Arabia, CULTURUNNERS, and the UK charity The Crossway Foundation (a UK charity enabling cultural exchange and training for young people).

Stapleton is known for developing platforms for cultural exchange and diplomacy between the Middle East, Europe and the United States.

Stapleton has produced over 50 international exhibitions including at Museums and Biennales in London, New York, Venice, Istanbul, Berlin, Dubai, Riyadh, Jeddah, Miami, Aspen, Houston, Oslo, San Francisco, Salt Lake City, Detroit, Memphis, Lewiston, Washington, D.C., and Los Angeles. Stapleton has published six internationally distributed books and produced a series of Virtual Reality and Short Film documentaries for distribution via international media platforms including The Guardian, Creative Time and VR Forum.

== Background ==
Stephen Stapleton was born on March 24, 1976, in Aylesbury, United Kingdom. He studied at Radley College, the University of Brighton and the University of London.

== Career ==
In 2002 to 2003 during an artist-led expedition across the Middle East, Stapleton visited the al-Meftaha Arts Village in South-Western Saudi Arabia where he became intrigued by the work of the artists he met there. From this encounter, Stapleton founded the company Edge of Arabia and began producing international exhibitions of Arab contemporary art (with a focus on Saudi Arabia) across Europe, the United States, and the Middle East.

In 2011, Stapleton produced The Future of a Promise, bringing together more than twenty-five recent art works and commissions by some of the foremost Arab world artists to make the largest Pan-Arab landmark exhibition of contemporary art at the 54th International Art Exhibition – la Biennale di Venezia.

In September 2014, he launched (at the Rothko Chapel) the company CULTURUNNERS providing an independent model of cultural exchange and artist-point-of-view storytelling across physical and ideological borders. As its first project, CULTURUNNERS embarked on the largest ever cultural diplomacy tour (2014–2018) between the Middle East and the United States, traveling over 30,000 miles across the US in a 34-foot converted RV hosting over 120 artists and delivering exhibitions, films and events in museums and institutions.

At end of 2017 Stapleton became an Executive Producer leading development and financing of the VR Film 'Reframe Saudi' that explores the social and economic transformations reshaping Saudi from the perspectives of a new generation of contemporary artists. On completion of filming in 2018 it undertook a tour of Festival de Cannes, Phillips NY, Art Dubai, Tribeca Film Festival, Milano Film Festival and was chosen as an official selection at the World VR Forum (WVRF).

During 2018 Stapleton initiated and created a global arts program revealed at MOMA (Program launch & Cultural Threads think tank), Art Dubai & Dubai Art Week (Fully Booked, Huroof Exhibition and symposium), LACMA (VIP event), Kennedy Center Washington DC (Saudi Art Exhibition), Newseum, Washington DC (Changing Landscapes Panel Discussion), Phillips (Reframe Saudi Exhibition & VR Screening), KSA/LAX (Space Land), Art Paris Art Fair & Institut de Monde Arab, (MisKulturExpo), and UNESCO (think tank). He also created the first ever Saudi National Pavilion at the La Biennale di Veneziz International Architecture Biennale.

In October 2018 in New York, Stapleton as Director of Edge of Arabia conceived and led the development of the Arab World Art & Education Initiative, to build greater understanding between the United States and the Arab world through museums, exhibitions, artist dialogues and education programs in schools and universities. Partners include: 2 Bridges Music Arts, Art Jameel, ArtX, Asia Society Brooklyn Museum, Columbia University, Edge of Arabia Middle East Institute, Misk Art Institute, Pioneer Works, Solomon R. Guggenheim Museum, Elizabeth Foundation for the Arts, the Metropolitan Museum of Art, The Museum of Modern Art, UNESCO, Washington Street Historical Society and WeWork.
