= Abdulnasser Gharem =

Saudi Arabian artist and former army officer

- عبدالناصر غارم
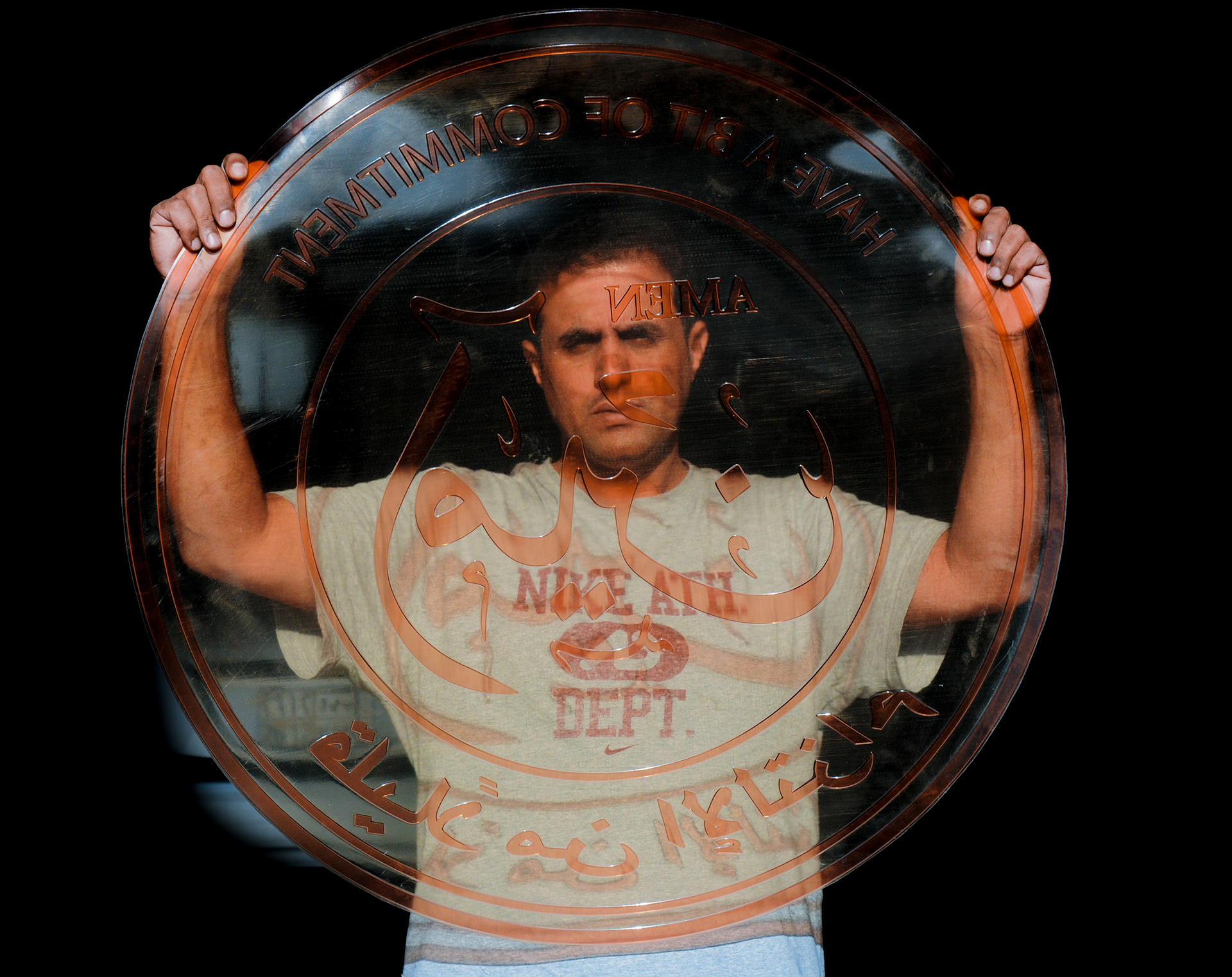
- Gharem in 2009
- Born: 4 June 1973 (age 53); Khamis Mushait, Saudi Arabia
- Education: King Abdulaziz Academy, The Leader Institute Riyadh, Al Meftaha Arts Village
- Known for: Conceptual art, installation art, painting
- Notable work: Message/Messenger, Men at Work, Detour, Makkah Road, Concrete, The Path (Siraat), The Stamp
- Movement: Postmodern art
- Abdulnasser Gharem Abdulnasser Gharem interviewed by Richard Quest for CNN
- Website: abdulnassergharem.com

Abdulnasser Gharem (Arabic: عبد الناصر غارم; born 4 June 1973) is a Saudi Arabian conceptual artist and a former lieutenant colonel in the Saudi Arabian army. He co-founded the arts initiative Edge of Arabia in 2003 and later founded Gharem Studio in Riyadh.

In April 2011, his installation Message/Messenger sold at Christie's in Dubai for US$842,500, more than ten times its estimate. At the time, it was the most expensive work sold at auction by a living Arab artist.

Gharem's work is in the collections of the British Museum, the Victoria and Albert Museum, the Los Angeles County Museum of Art and the Saudi Ministry of Culture. His work uses materials such as rubber stamps, concrete and found objects, and has included performances involving a collapsed bridge and an invasive tree.

== Early life and education ==
Gharem was born in Khamis Mushait. He graduated from the King Abdulaziz Academy in 1992 and then attended the Leader Institute in Riyadh. He has had no formal art training. In 2003, he studied at the Al-Meftaha Arts Village in Abha.

== Military career ==
Gharem served as an officer in the Saudi Arabian army, rising to the rank of lieutenant colonel, while developing his art practice in parallel. By 2017, he had left the army.

== Art career ==
In 2003, Gharem co-founded Edge of Arabia with the Saudi artist Ahmed Mater and the British artist Stephen Stapleton. In 2004, he and other Al-Meftaha artists staged the group exhibition Shattah in Saudi Arabia. He has since exhibited in Europe, the Persian Gulf and the United States, including at the Martin-Gropius-Bau and the Venice Biennale, Sharjah Biennial and Berlin Biennale.

Message/Messenger, a three-metre wood and copper dome that refers to the Dome of the Rock, was one of six works sold by Edge of Arabia at Christie's Dubai in April 2011 to fund its education programmes in Saudi Arabia. Gharem donated the proceeds of the sale to these programmes. His first monograph, Abdulnasser Gharem: Art of Survival, was published in London in October 2011.

In 2013, Gharem moved to Riyadh and founded Gharem Studio, which began as his own workspace and developed into a studio supporting young Saudi artists.

In 2017, the Los Angeles County Museum of Art held Abdulnasser Gharem: Pause, his first solo exhibition in the United States. Curated by Linda Komaroff, it presented 11 works made in response to the September 11 attacks. It was organized with the King Abdulaziz Center for World Culture.

In 2019, his installation The Safe was shown in Art Unlimited at Art Basel. Artnet News reported that the work referred to the killing of the journalist Jamal Khashoggi. In 2022, Hospitable Thoughts at Marc Straus Gallery was his first solo exhibition in New York.

In 2026, Galerie Nagel Draxler in Berlin presented a solo exhibition of three new projects: Aniconism, The Unscored Goal and The Image is a Public Menace (Neon).

Gharem lives and works in Riyadh.

== Selected solo exhibitions ==
2026 | Galerie Nagel Draxler, Berlin, Germany.

2022 | Hospitable Thoughts, Marc Straus Gallery, New York, US (6 September – 18 December 2022).

2020 | Smart Obedience / Kluger Gehorsam, Galerie Nagel Draxler, Berlin, Germany (12 September – 1 November 2020).

2019 | The Safe, Art Unlimited, Art Basel, Basel, Switzerland (13–16 June 2019).

2018 | Subversive Forms of Social Sculpture (with Heimo Zobernig), Sharjah Art Museum, Sharjah, UAE (26 September – 17 November 2018).

2017 | Abdulnasser Gharem: Pause, Los Angeles County Museum of Art, Los Angeles, US (16 April – 16 July 2017).

2014 | The Awakening, Ayyam Gallery, Dubai, UAE (17 March – 30 April 2014).

2013 | Edge of Arabia presents: Abdulnasser Gharem, London, UK (9 October – 8 November 2013).

2013 | Abdulnasser Gharem, Side by Side Gallery, Berlin, Germany (25 April – 13 July 2013).

2010 | Restored Behaviour, XVA Gallery, Dubai, UAE (17 January – 10 March 2010).

2006 | The Path, King Fahd Art Village, Abha, Saudi Arabia.

2004 | The White Tongue Who Speaks Slowly, King Fahad Art Village, Abha, Saudi Arabia.

2004 | Who Keeps Watching the Sun (Sunflower field), Death Mattered – Attileh, Jeddah, Saudi Arabia.

2003 | Mute, Attileh, Jeddah, Saudi Arabia.

2003 | UN Inspector, Attileh, Jeddah, Saudi Arabia.

== Selected group exhibitions ==
2024 | Gracefulness of Daily Life, Zidoun-Bossuyt Gallery, Dubai, UAE.

2021 | Glasstress Boca Raton, Boca Raton Museum of Art, Boca Raton, Florida, US (27 January – 5 September 2021).

2017 | Desert to Delta: Contemporary Art in Memphis, Art Museum of the University of Memphis (8 October 2017 – 6 January 2018).

2017 | Memories of a Journey: Hajj, Sheikh Zayed Grand Mosque, Abu Dhabi, UAE (20 September 2017 – 19 March 2018).

2017 | Epicenter X: Contemporary Saudi Art in Detroit, Arab American National Museum, Dearborn, Michigan, US (8 July – 1 October 2017).

2017 | Glasstress, Palazzo Franchetti, Venice, Italy (11 May – 26 November 2017).

2016 | Cities of Conviction: Contemporary Saudi Art in Salt Lake City, Utah Museum of Contemporary Art (25 August 2016 – 6 January 2017).

2016 | Phantom Punch: Contemporary Art from Saudi Arabia in Lewiston, Bates College Museum of Art (28 October 2016 – 18 March 2017).

2016 | Genera#ion, Minnesota Street Project, San Francisco, US (11 August – 6 September 2016).

2016 | Gonzo Arabia: Contemporary Saudi Art in Aspen, Boogie's Retail, Aspen, Colorado, US (30 June – 1 September 2016).

2016 | Parallel Kingdom, Station Museum, Houston, Texas, US (8 June – 2 October 2016).

2016 | Illumination: New Contemporary Art at the Louisiana, Louisiana Museum of Modern Art, Humlebæk, Denmark (1 March – 11 September 2016).

2015 | Ricochet, Asia House Gallery, London, UK (12–18 October 2015).

2015 | Saudi Art Contemporary, Chalet Saqqarah, Gstaad, Switzerland (18 April 2015).

2014 | View from Inside: Contemporary Arab Photography, FotoFest, Houston, Texas, US (14 March – 27 April 2014).

2014 | Word and Illumination, Le Meridien Medina Hall, Madinah, Saudi Arabia (10 February – 15 April 2014).

2014 | Arab Contemporary, Louisiana Museum of Modern Art, Humlebæk, Denmark (31 January – 4 May 2014).

2012 | Light from the Middle East: New Photography, Victoria and Albert Museum, London, UK (13 November 2012 – 7 April 2013).

2012 | 25 Years of Arab Creativity, Institut du Monde Arabe, Paris, France (16 October 2012 – 3 February 2013).

2012 | #Cometogether, Edge of Arabia, London, UK (7–28 October 2012).

2012 | Voice of Images, Palazzo Grassi, Venice, Italy (30 August 2012 – 13 January 2013).

2012 | Edge of Arabia: Contemporary Art From Saudi Arabia, Galerie Krinzinger, Vienna, Austria (21 June – 7 July 2012).

2012 | Arab Express: The Latest Art From the Arab World, Mori Art Museum, Tokyo, Japan (16 June – 28 October 2012).

2012 | Porta dell'Oriente, Roma Contemporary, Rome, Italy (25–27 May 2012).

2012 | Bending History, Katara Cultural Village, Doha, Qatar (8 March – 8 April 2012).

2012 | Hajj: Journey to the Heart of Islam, British Museum, London, UK (26 January – 15 April 2012).

2012 | We Need to Talk, Edge of Arabia, Al Furusia Marina, Jeddah, Saudi Arabia (20 January – 26 February 2012).

2012 | Contemporary Istanbul, Istanbul, Turkey (22–25 November 2012).

2011 | Political Patterns, ifa-Galerie, Berlin, Germany (8 July – 3 October 2011).

2011 | The Future of a Promise: Contemporary Art from the Arab World, Magazzini del Sale, 54th Venice Biennale, Italy (3 June – 30 November 2011).

2011 | The Bravery of Being Out of Range, Athr Gallery, Jeddah, Saudi Arabia (17 May – 11 June 2011).

2011 | The New Middle East, Willem Baars Projects, Amsterdam, Netherlands (21 May – 30 June 2011).

2011 | Edge of Arabia Dubai: Terminal, Gate Village, Dubai International Financial Centre, Dubai, UAE (14 March – 15 April 2011).

2011 | Uppers & Downers, Traffic, Dubai, UAE (9 February – 5 March 2011).

2011 | Nujoom: Constellations of Arab Art from The Farjam Collection, The Farjam Collection at DIFC, Dubai, UAE (November 2010 – March 2011).

2011 | I Don't Need Your Money Honey All I Need is Love, Traffic, Dubai, UAE (5–27 January 2011).

2010 | Edge of Arabia Istanbul: Transition, Sanat Limanı, Antrepo 5, Istanbul, Turkey (10 November – 11 December 2010).

2010 | Opening the Doors: Collecting Middle Eastern Art, Abu Dhabi Art, Abu Dhabi, UAE (3–7 November 2010).

2010 | CAVE: Contemporary Arab Video Encounter, Maraya Art Centre, Sharjah, UAE (2 November – 11 December 2010).

2010 | Emerging Asian Artists, Gwangju Biennale, Gwangju, South Korea (3 September – 7 November 2010).

2010 | Edge of Arabia Berlin: Grey Borders/Grey Frontiers, Soho House, Berlin, Germany (10 June – 18 July 2010).

2010 | Fuck Ups, Fables and Fiascos, Galerie Caprice Horn, Berlin, Germany (8 June – 17 September 2010).

2010 | Edge of Arabia World Tour Launch, Global Competitiveness Forum, Riyadh, Saudi Arabia (23–26 January 2010).

2009 | Taswir: Pictorial Mappings of Islam and Modernity, Martin-Gropius-Bau, Berlin, Germany (5 November 2009 – 18 January 2010).

2009 | The 28th Annual Exhibition, Gulf Fine Arts Society, Sharjah, UAE (10 March 2009).

2009 | Edge of Arabia Venice, Palazzo Polignac, 53rd Venice Biennale, Italy (5 June – 2 August 2009).

2008 | Edge of Arabia London: Contemporary Art from Saudi Arabia, SOAS Brunei Gallery, University of London, UK (5 June – 2 August 2008).

2007 | Still Life: Art, Ecology and the Politics of Change, Sharjah Biennial 8, Sharjah, UAE (4 April – 4 June 2007).

2006 | Son of Aseer, Al-Meftaha Arts Village, Abha, Saudi Arabia (10–30 October 2006).

2004 | Shattah, Atelier Gallery, Jeddah, Saudi Arabia (27 April – 14 May 2004).

== Collections ==
- Pinault Collection, Palazzo Grassi, Venice, Italy
- Louisiana Museum of Modern Art, Humlebæk, Denmark
- British Museum, London, UK
- Victoria and Albert Museum, London, UK
- Los Angeles County Museum of Art, Los Angeles, US
- Ministry of Culture, Riyadh, Saudi Arabia
- The Jameel Foundation
- Nadour Collection
- Greenbox Museum
- Barjeel Art Foundation, Sharjah, UAE
- The Farook Collection
- The Farjam Collection
- Kamel Lazaar Foundation
- Basma Alsulaiman Museum of Contemporary Art (BASMOCA)
- The Dubai Collection, Dubai, UAE
- Ministry of Culture, Doha, Qatar
- Guggenheim Abu Dhabi, Abu Dhabi, UAE

== Publications ==
- Borcherdt, Gesine (2024). Dream on Baby: Artists and Their Childhood Memories. Germany: Hatje Cantz Verlag. ISBN 978-3-7757-5682-2
- Danforth, Loring (2016). Crossing the Kingdom: Portraits of Saudi Arabia. United States: University of California Press. ISBN 978-0-520-29027-3
- Jameel, Porter, King, Stapleton, Al-Turki (2012). Edge of Arabia: Contemporary Art from Saudi Arabia. London: Booth-Clibborn. ISBN 1-86154-323-9
- Porter, Venetia (2012). Hajj: Journey to the Heart of Islam. London: Harvard University Press. ISBN 0-674-06218-3
- Hemming, Henry (2011). Abdulnasser Gharem: Art of Survival. London: Booth-Clibborn. ISBN 1-86154-324-7
- Lazaar, Lina and Downey, Anthony (2011). The Future of a Promise. London: Ibraaz. ISBN 978-1-86154-323-3
