= Muhyi al-Din Lari =

16th-century author and miniaturist

Muḥyi al-Dīn Lārī (Arabic: محي الدين لاري), died 1521 or 1526–7, was a 16th-century miniaturist and writer, best known for his Kitab Futūḥ al-Ḥaramayn, a guidebook to the Islamic holy cities of Mecca and Medina.

== Life and works ==
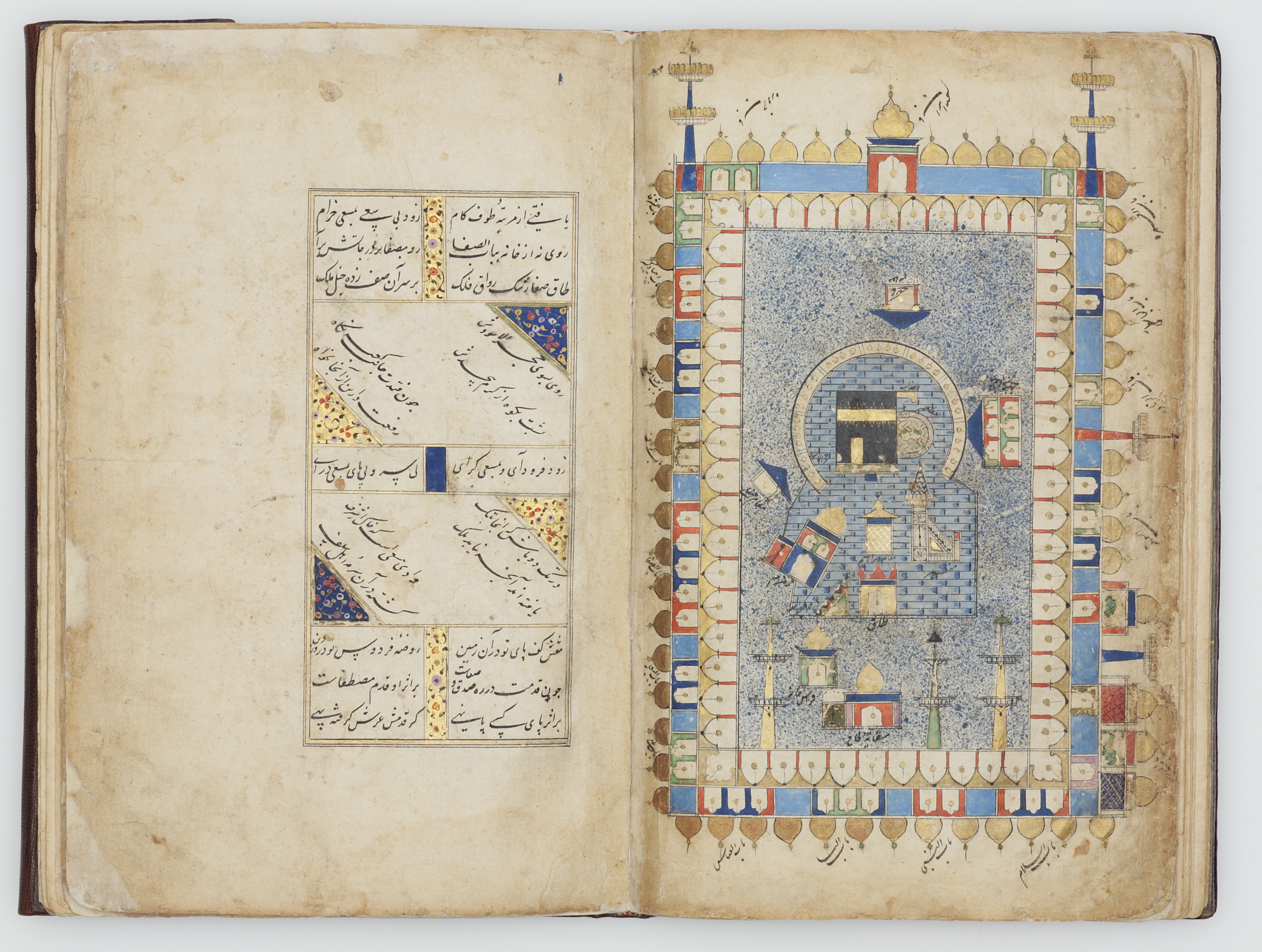
Depiction of the Masjid al-Haram (Sacred Mosque) and Kaaba in a manuscript of the Futūh al-Haramayn, 1582 (Khalili Collection of Hajj and the Arts of Pilgrimage)

Little is known about Lari's early life and career. He is thought to be of either Persian or Indian origin. Lari might suggest he was from Lar, a town south-east of Shiraz. He was a student of Jalal al-Din Davani, a noted Persian scholar who wrote the first treatise on the poet Hafez's works, and who is known to have visited Lar.

Lari's Kitab Futūḥ al-Ḥaramayn (Revelations of the Two Holy Sanctuaries), written in Persian, is dedicated to Muzaffar al-Din ibn Mahmud Shah, who ruled Gujarat from 1511 to 1526. It is a guidebook for the Hajj pilgrimage. The manuscript comprises 45 leaves with writing in two columns of naskh script and eighteen illuminated (but stylised, rather than accurate) illustrations, including holy sites in Medina, scenes between Medina and Mecca, and the various stages of the Hajj in Mecca. The illuminations are with ink, opaque watercolour and gold on paper. It contains a detailed depictions of the Kaaba, indicating the areas assigned for the worship of the various sects of Islam, the named entrance doors to the sanctum, minarets, and two rows of colonnades. While traditionally pilgrim manuals desisted from human depictions, preferring to illustrate landscapes and holy sites only, Lari's miniatures are an exception, with rendered people appearing in some of them. Lari's mystical verse, meanwhile, describes the ceremonies of the Hajj and their essence.

Lari's attention to architectural detail, use of the colour palette and expert draughtsmanship have been lauded. His painting of Mecca's Sacred Mosque became a widely reproduced image for several centuries. His miniatures showing Mount Arafat as well as mahmals were re-crafted into Hajj certificates that were in use even in the 18th century.

At least twelve manuscripts have survived to date. All of them contain illustrations of the various stages of the Hajj, with each station labelled. Several of the manuscripts are known from their colophons to have been produced in Mecca. Pages from some copies have appeared at various auctions. The earliest copy now extant is a copy made in Mecca in 1544; it now resides in the British Library. The Khalili Collection of Hajj and the Arts of Pilgrimage has exemplars from 16th century Mecca and 18th or early 19th century India. Lari's original document has been copied and re-illustrated over the centuries, and editions have been found in Turkey, Persia and India. The later versions often have misspellings and inconsistencies, either because the scribe was unskilled or because Lari's ornate language was difficult.

Inspired by his teacher's example, Lari wrote a commentary on ibn al-Fārid's Kasida, called al-Taiyya al-kubra. In this, he attempted to show the coherence between orthodox Islamic mysticism and Aristotelian thought.

Lari is thought to have died either in 1521 or 1526-7.

== Bibliography ==
=== Books and journals ===
- Berthels, E. (2012). "Muḥyi 'l-Dīn Lārī". In Bearman, P.; Bianquis, Th.; Bosworth, C.E.; van Donzel, E.; Heinrichs, W.P. (eds.). Encyclopedia of Islam (2 ed.). ISBN 9789004161214.
- Esin, Atıl (1987). The Age of Sultan Süleyman the Magnificent. National Gallery of Art. ISBN 978-0-8109-1855-9.
- Ekhtiar, Maryam D.; Moore, Claire, eds. (2012). Art of the Islamic World – A Resource for Educators. Metropolitan Museum of Art. ISBN 978-1-58839-482-8.
- Milstein, Rachel (2006). Wasserstein, David J.; Ayalon, Ami (eds.). "Mapping the sacred in Sixteenth Century Illustrated Manuscripts of Futuh al-Haramayn". Mamluks and Ottomans: Studies in Honour of Michael Winter. Routledge.
- Mois, Luitgard; Buitelaar, Marjo (2015). Hajj: Global Interactions through Pilgrimage. Sidestone Press. ISBN 978-90-8890-285-7.
- Porter, Venetia (2012). The Art of Hajj. Interlink Books. ISBN 978-1-56656-884-5.
- Pourjavady, Reza (2011). Philosophy in Early Safavid Iran: Najm Al-Din Mahmud Al-Nayrizi and His Writings. Brill. ISBN 978-90-04-19173-0.
- Sardar, Ziauddin (2014). Mecca – The Sacred City. Bloomsbury. ISBN 978-1408809204.

=== Websites ===
- "Muhyi Al-Din Lari: Kitab Futuh Al-Haramayn". Bonhams. 19 April 2016.
- "17th century depiction of the Holy Shrine of Mecca, OR 343". The British Library.
- "Muhyi Al-Din Lari: Kitab Futuh Al-Haramayn and Other Texts". Christie's. 9 October 2014.
- "Muhyi Al-Din Lari: Kitab Futuh Al-Haramayn". Christie's. 18 April 2016.
- "Futuh al-Haramayn (a Handbook for Pilgrims to Mecca and Medina) of Muhyi al-Din Lari, MSS 1274". Khalili Collections.
- "Futuh al-Haramayn (a Handbook for Pilgrims to Mecca and Medina) of Muhyi Lari, MSS 1308". Khalili Collections.
- "Futuh al-Haramain (Description of the Holy Cities), 32.131". Metropolitan Museum. New York.
- "Futuh al-Haramayn (Description of the Holy Cities), 2008.251". Metropolitan Museum. New York.
- "Futuh al-Haramayn (Description of the Holy Cities), 2009.343". Metropolitan Museum. New York.

Media related to Muhi al-Din Lari at Wikimedia Commons
