= Futuh al-Haramayn =

Guidebook for Hajj pilgrims

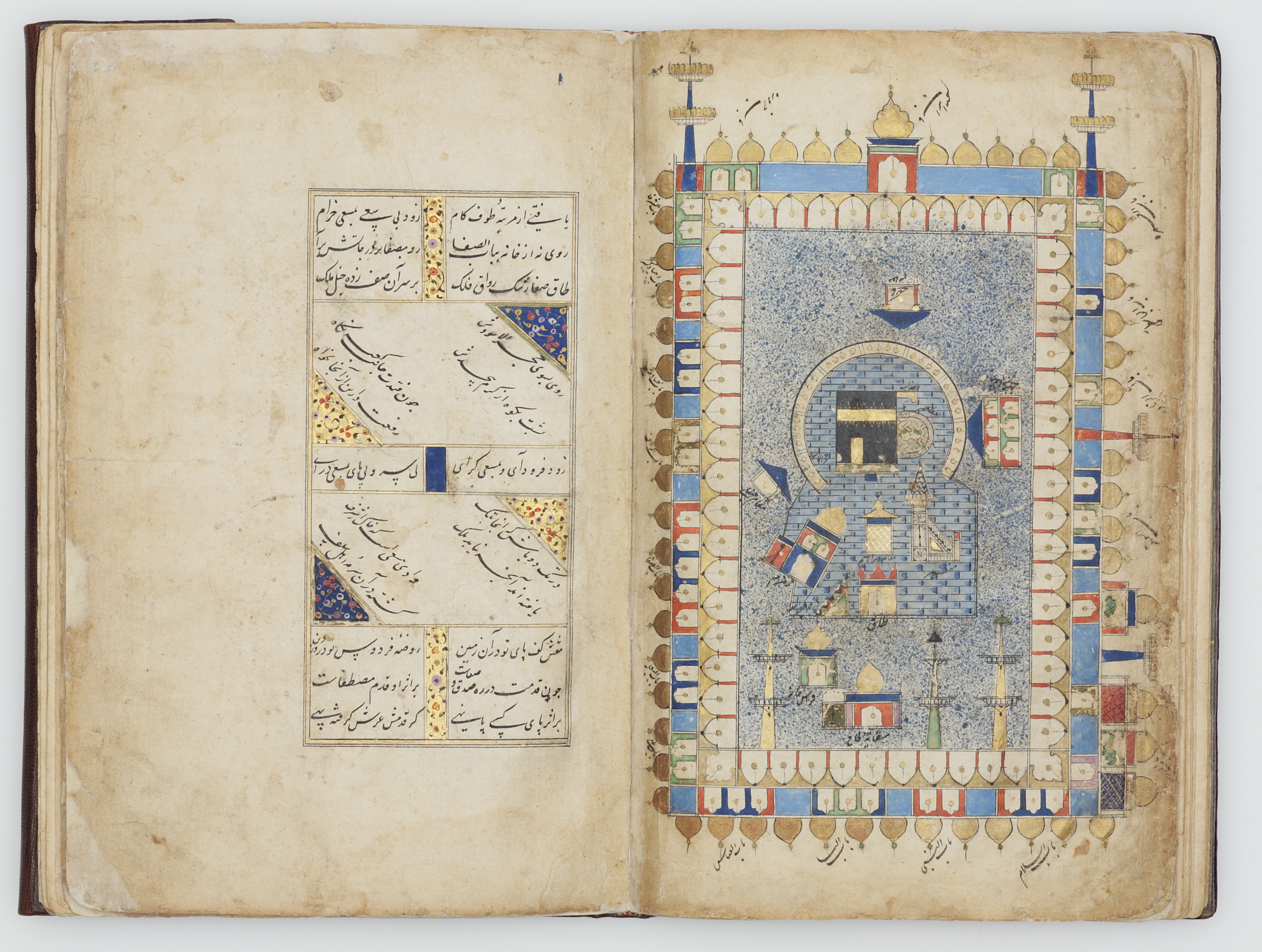
Illustration from a 1582 manuscript of Futuh al-Haramayn showing the Kaaba within the Masjid al-Haram. Khalili Collection of Hajj and the Arts of Pilgrimage

Futuh al-Haramayn (a Handbook for Pilgrims to Mecca and Medina) is considered the first Islamic guidebook for pilgrimage. It was written by Muhi al-Din Lari and completed in India in 1505–6. The book was dedicated to Muzaffar ibn Mahmudshah, the ruler of Gujarat. No early illustrated Indian copies are known, but later in the 16th century it was widely copied in Ottoman Turkey. The book describes the full rituals of the Hajj in order, and describes the religious sites one can visit.

== Manuscripts ==
More than twenty manuscripts of the Futuh are known to exist.

Institution	Inventory number	Origin	Date	Size	Notes
Chester Beatty Library	Per 192	Iran	1525-1550		
National Museum, New Delhi	55.73/1357	Gujarat	1548		
Topkapı Saray Museum	R. 916		circa 1550		
Topkapı Saray Museum	R. 917	Turkey	circa 1550		
Metropolitan Museum of Art	32.131	Turkey	mid 16th century		
Metropolitan Museum of Art	2009.343	Bukhara	16th century		
Khalili Collection of Hajj and the Arts of Pilgrimage	MSS 1038	Mecca	1582	42 folios	
Chester Beatty Library	Per 245	Mecca	1595		
Chester Beatty Library	Per 249	Mecca	late 16th century		
Royal Ontario Museum	967.270	Mecca	early 17th century		
Bibliothèque nationale de France	Persan 237	Mecca	undated, attributed to early 17th century		
British Library	Or 343	Iran	17th century	41 folios	
Metropolitan Museum of Art	2008.251	India	1678		
Bibliothèque nationale de France	SP 1340		18th century	20 folios	
Khalili Collection of Hajj and the Arts of Pilgrimage	MSS 1274	India	18th – early 19th century	40 folios	
Leiden University Library	Or. 14.620		undated	45 folios	

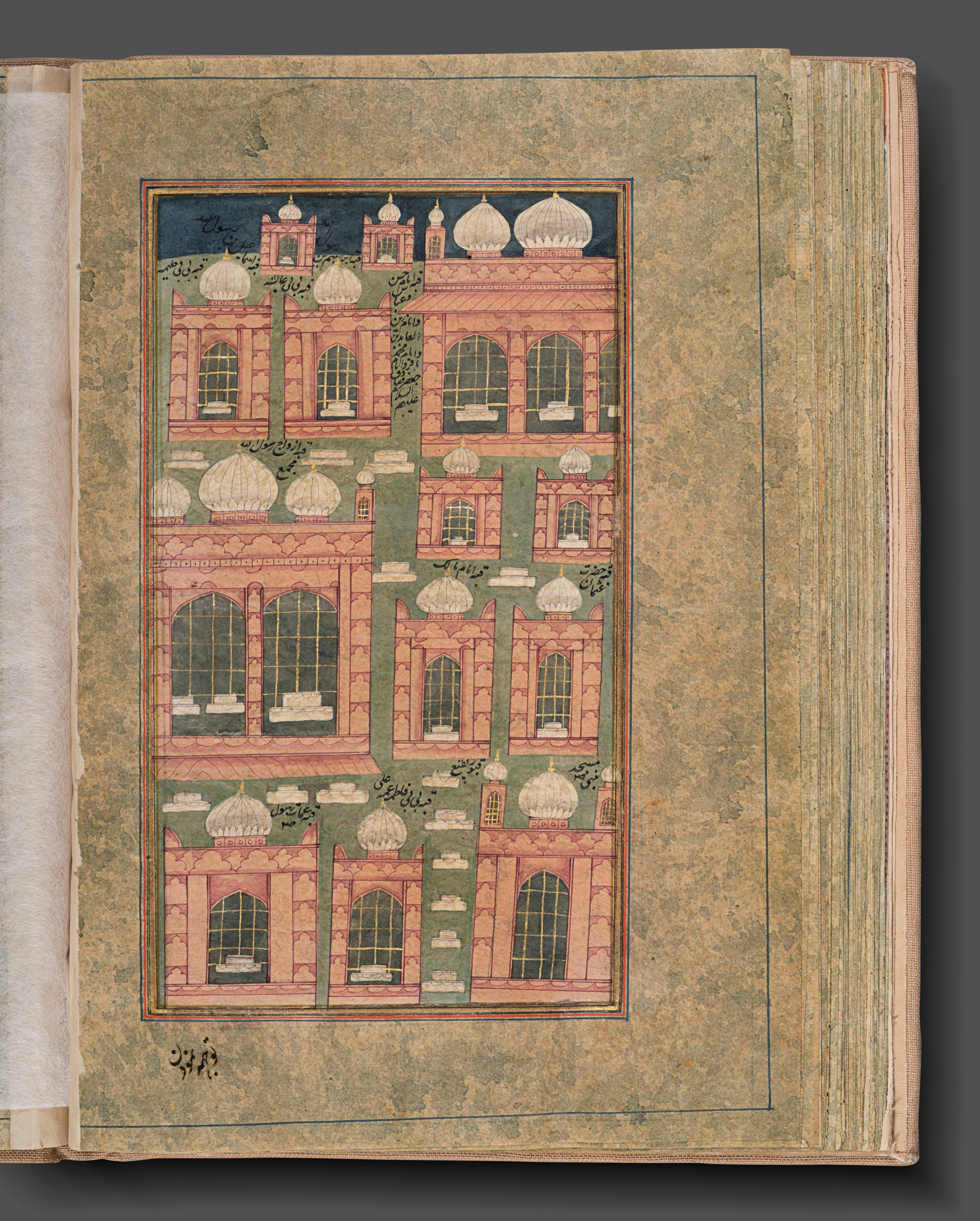
Page from one of the earliest known manuscripts of Futuh al-Haramayn, dated 1548 and probably made in Gujarat. National Museum, New Delhi

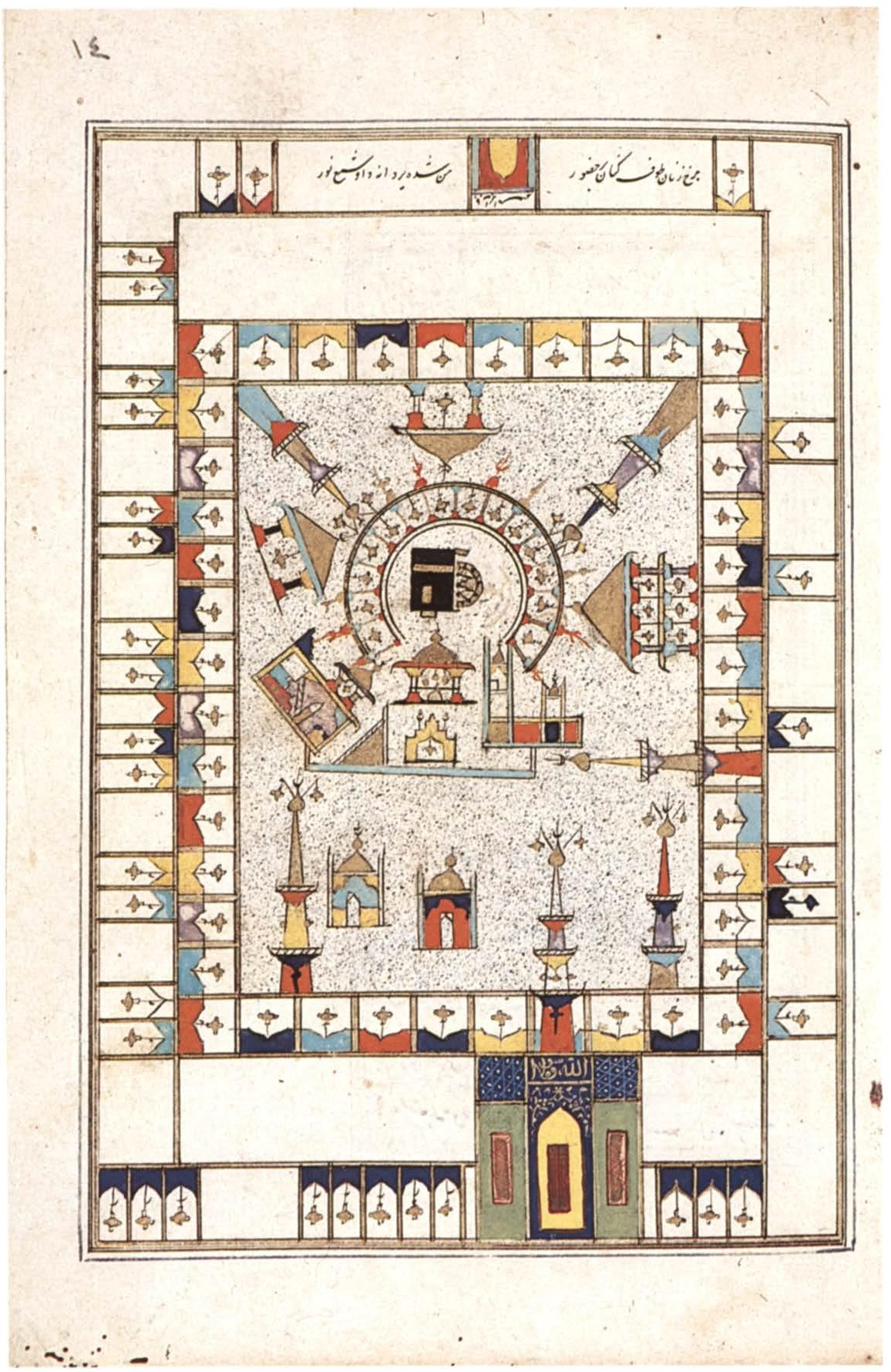
Miniature with view of the Masjid al-Haram from the manuscript of Futuh al-Haramayn made for sultan Suleiman the Magnificent, c. 1550. Topkapı Saray Museum

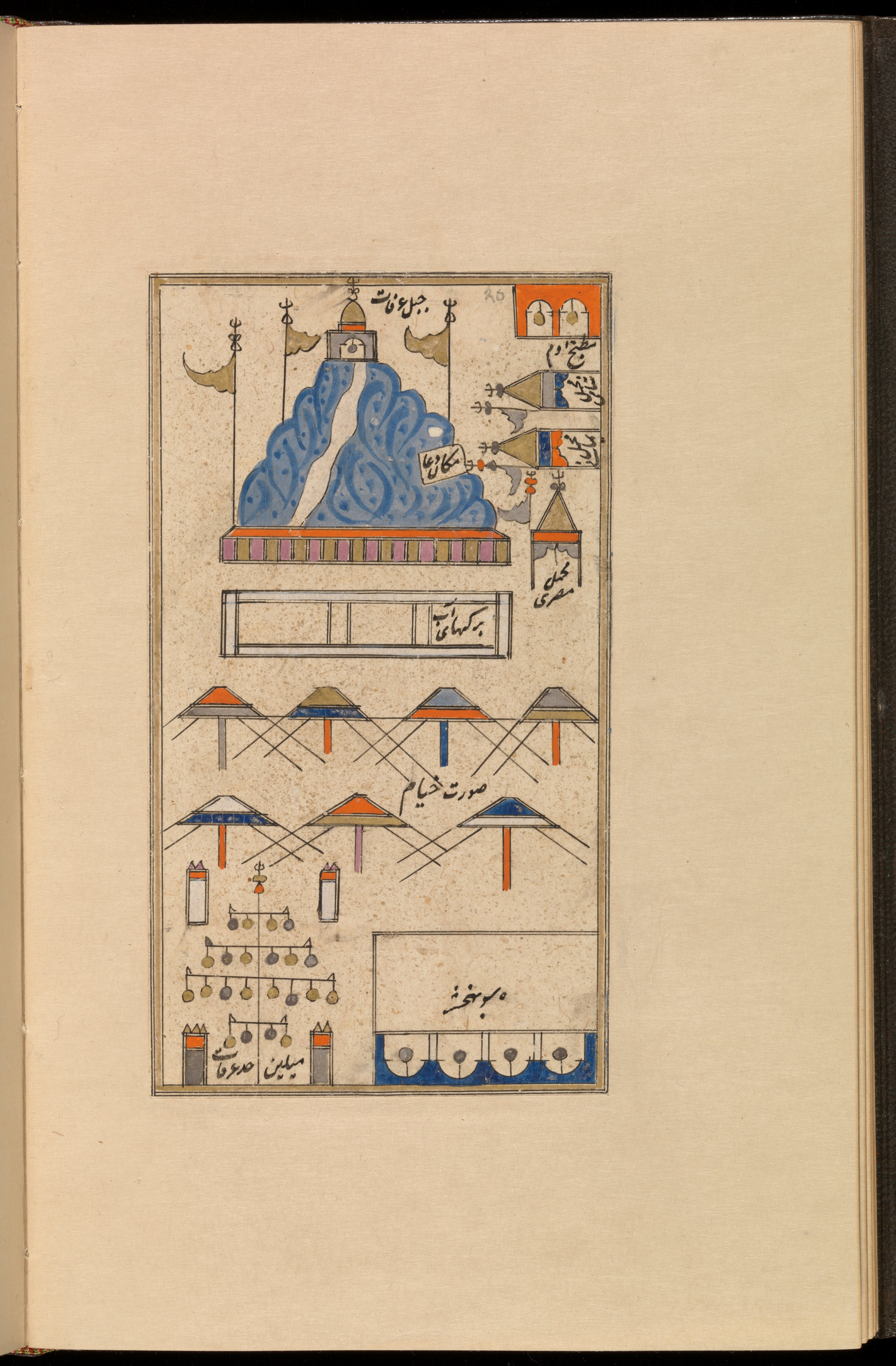
Mount Arafat. From the manuscript of Futuh al-Haramayn made in Mecca in 1595. Chester Beatty Library

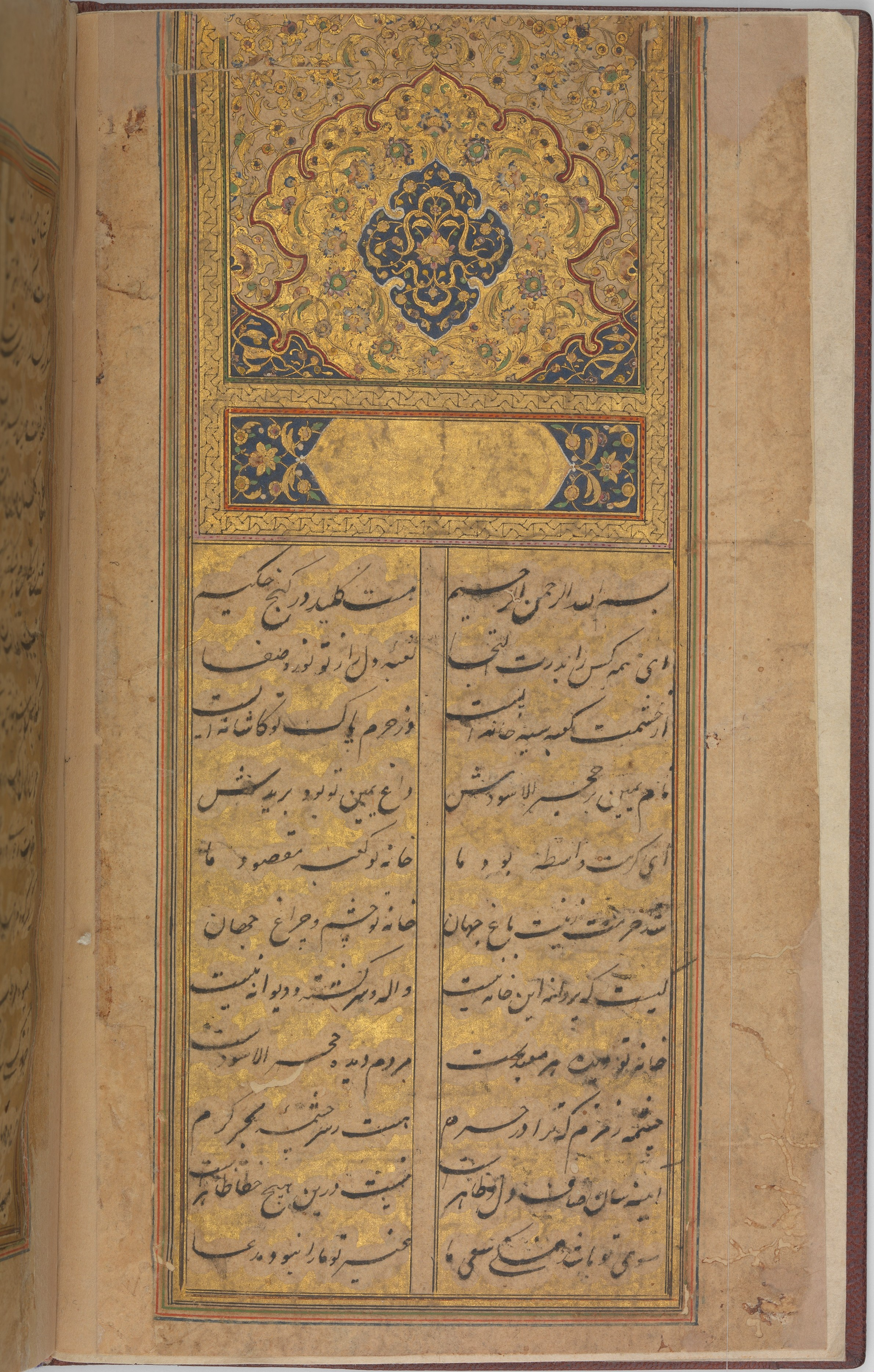
Illuminated frontispiece from the manuscript of Futuh al-Haramayn made in Bijapur sultanate in 1678. Metropolitan Museum of Art
