= Ahmed Mater =

Saudi artist and physician (born 1979)

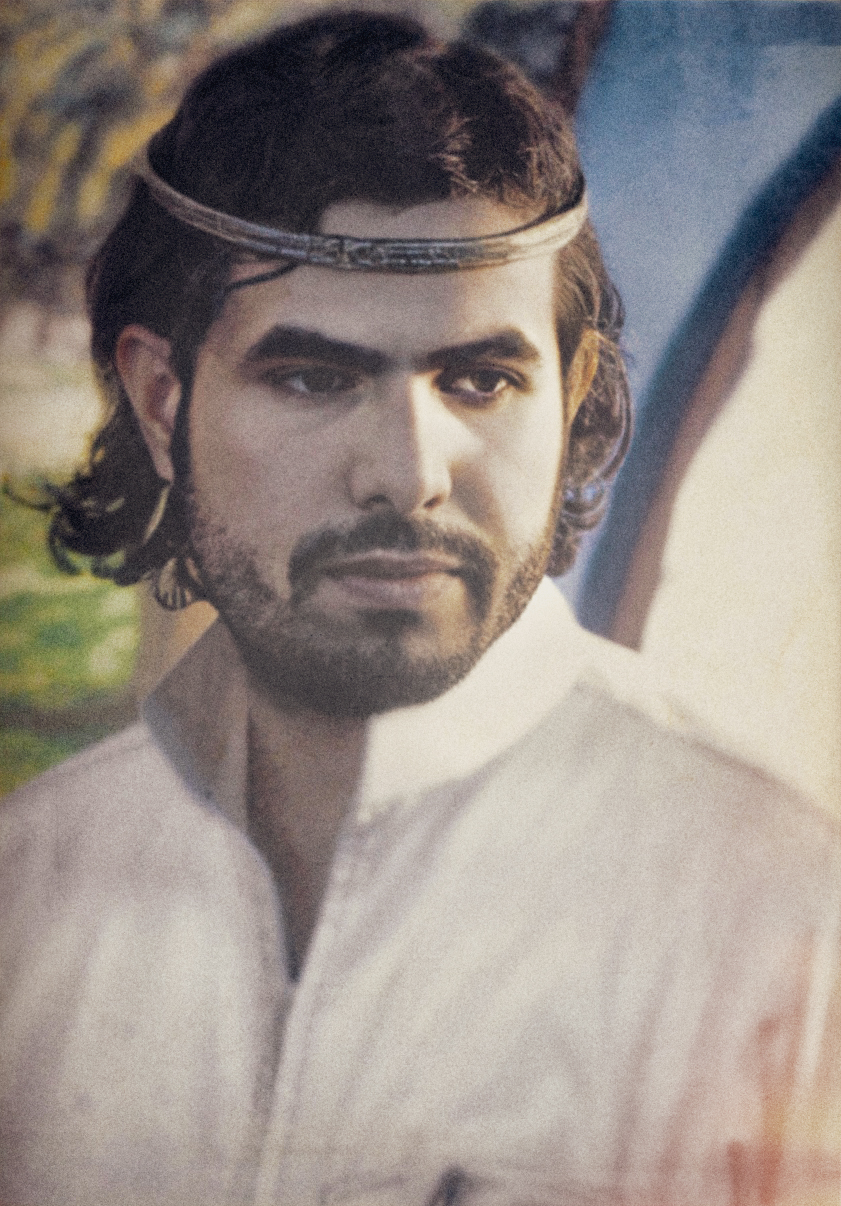
- Ahmed Mater in 2004, pictured wearing elements of the traditional attire from the Asir region in southern Saudi Arabia.
- Born: July 25, 1979 (age 47); Tabuk, Saudi Arabia
- Education: King Khalid University, Abha College of Medicine – Medical Degree (MBBS)
- Known for: Photography, Painting, Conceptual art, Land art
- Notable work: "Magnetism", "Desert of Pharan", "Illumination"
- Awards: Takreem Foundation Cultural Excellence Award (2018); Abha Cultural Prize; Al-Muftaha Art Prize; Ordre des Arts et des Lettres – Chevalier (2024)
- Website: ahmedmater.com

Signature
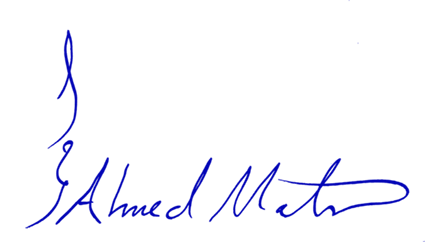

Ahmed Mater (Arabic: أحمد ماطر; born July 25, 1979) is a Saudi artist and physician. He uses photography, film, video, installation and text alongside traditional techniques such as painting and calligraphy. He trained as a doctor before turning to art, and in 2003 he co-founded Edge of Arabia, a platform that presented contemporary Saudi art to international audiences.

Mater's work is in the collections of the British Museum, the Brooklyn Museum, the Centre Pompidou, the Dalloul Art Foundation, the Los Angeles County Museum of Art (LACMA), the Nadour Collection, the Smithsonian National Museum of Asian Art, and the Solomon R. Guggenheim Museum.

His solo exhibitions include Symbolic Cities: The Work of Ahmed Mater at the National Museum of Asian Art in Washington, D.C. (2016), Ahmed Mater: Mecca Journeys at the Brooklyn Museum (2017), and Ahmed Mater: Antenna at UCCA Edge in Shanghai (2025).

== Early life and education ==
Mater was born in Tabuk in 1979 and raised in the Asir region of south-western Saudi Arabia. He trained as a physician at King Khalid University in Abha. In Abha, he studied art at the Al-Meftaha Arts Village, where he was involved in some of the country's earliest contemporary art groups. In 2001, he co-founded the Shatta collective in Abha with Ashraf Fayadh, Abdulnasser Gharem and others.

== Career ==
=== Edge of Arabia ===
In 2003, Mater co-founded Edge of Arabia with the British artist Stephen Stapleton and the Saudi artist Abdulnasser Gharem. Over the following decade, it became one of the main vehicles for presenting contemporary Saudi art internationally.

=== Major works ===
In the 2000s, Mater worked in photography, installation and conceptual art. His work was included in the Venice Biennale in 2009, and again in the exhibition The Future of a Promise at the 2011 Biennale. His Illumination series draws on Islamic manuscript traditions. His Magnetism series uses a magnet to draw iron filings toward a central black cube. His work was shown in the 2013 exhibition Light from the Middle East at the Victoria and Albert Museum.

From 2008 to 2015, Mater worked on Desert of Pharan, a body of photographs and films documenting the large-scale redevelopment of Mecca. A book of the project, Desert of Pharan: Unofficial Histories Behind the Mass Expansion of Mecca, edited by Catherine David, was published by Lars Müller Publishers in 2016.

In 2016, Mater took part in the protest gatherings at the Standing Rock Sioux Reservation in North Dakota, where he exhibited Evolution of Man, a work that shows a human X-ray morphing into a petrol pump.

=== Misk Art Institute ===
In 2017, Mater became the founding director of the Misk Art Institute in Riyadh. The institute organized Saudi Arabia's first national pavilion at the Venice Architecture Biennale in 2018.

=== Wadi AlFann ===
In 2022, Mater was announced as one of the first five artists commissioned to create permanent land art works for Wadi AlFann, a desert art destination in AlUla, alongside James Turrell, Agnes Denes, Michael Heizer and Manal AlDowayan. His commission, Ashab Al-Lal (Mirage), is planned as a large oculus set into the desert floor, inspired by scientific and philosophical thinkers of the Islamic Golden Age.

=== Recent exhibitions ===
In 2024, Christie's in London held Ahmed Mater: Chronicles, a mid-career retrospective that included studies and sculptures for Ashab Al-Lal.

In 2025, Ahmed Mater: Antenna opened at UCCA Edge in Shanghai. Curated by Philip Tinari, it featured more than 100 works and was described as the first large-scale solo exhibition by a contemporary Saudi artist in China. It was part of the Saudi-Chinese Cultural Year, marking 35 years of diplomatic relations between the two countries.

In February 2026, Mater's work was presented by Athr Gallery at the first edition of Art Basel Qatar. He has also opened the Ahmed Mater Foundation near the Al-Meftaha Arts Village in Abha.

=== Honours ===
In 2024, he was made a Chevalier of the Ordre des Arts et des Lettres by the French Ministry of Culture.

== Publications ==
- Ahmed Mater (Booth-Clibborn Editions, 2010)
- Desert of Pharan: Unofficial Histories Behind the Mass Expansion of Mecca (Lars Müller Publishers, 2016)

== See also ==
- Islamic art
- Islamic calligraphy
- Contemporary art
- Edge of Arabia
