= Comus (Handel) =

1745 masque by Georg Friedrich Händel

The masque Comus, or There in the Blissful Shades (HWV * 44) is a short version of John Milton's Comus, based on a libretto earlier made by John Dalton for composer Thomas Arne's own Comus. The sixty-year-old Handel composed the setting in 1745 for the pleasure of other guests during his summer recuperation at the country seat of the Earl of Gainsborough. Some of the music was later recycled by Handel, for example as the tenor aria Then will I Jehovah's praise from the Occasional Oratorio.

== Recordings ==
- Alceste & Comus, Academy of Ancient Music, Christopher Hogwood. (L'Oiseau-Lyre, 1989)
- Handel at Vauxhall Vol. 2, London Early Opera, Bridget Cunningham (Signum Records, 2017)
