= Bridget Cunningham =

British-Irish harpsichordist

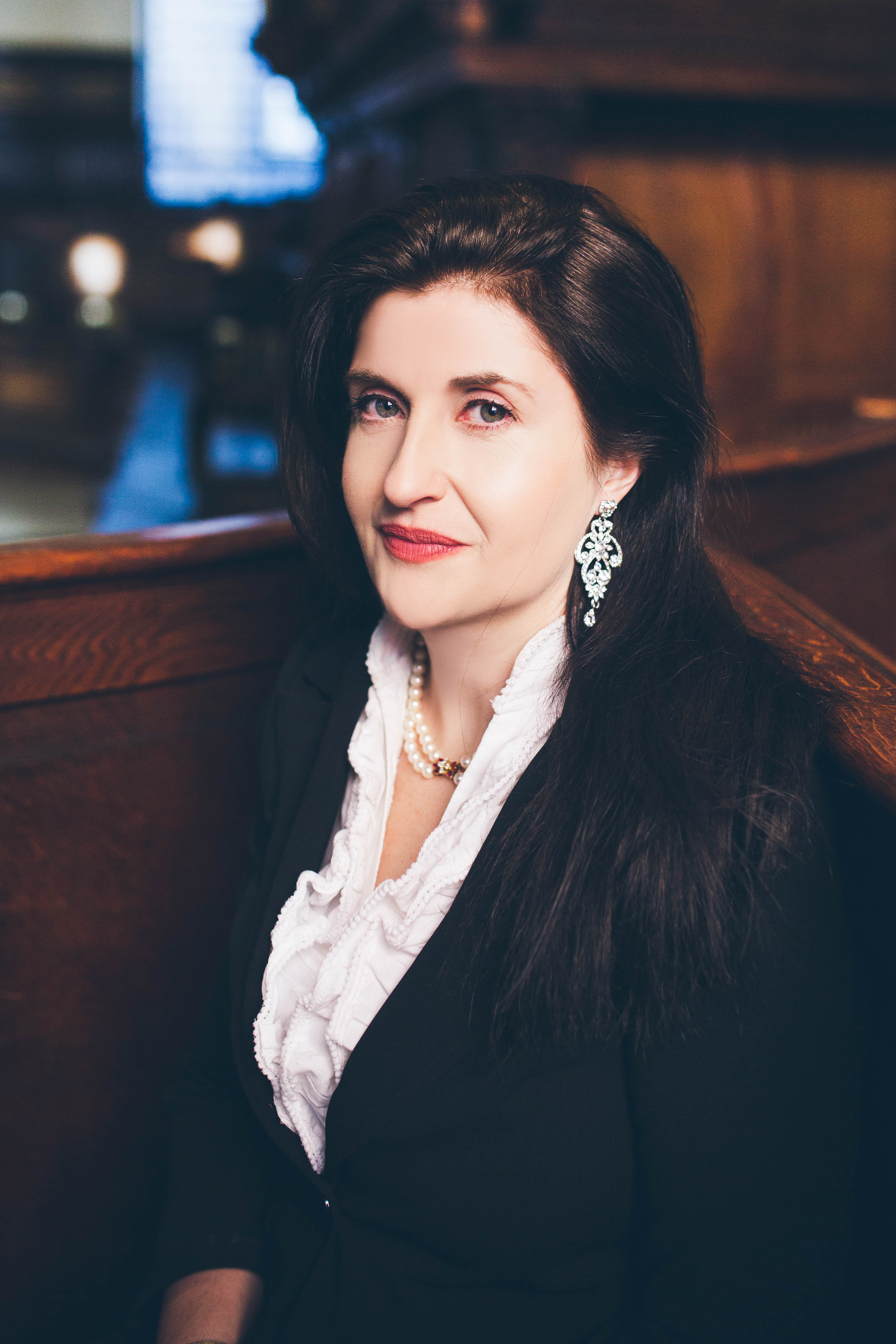
- Occupations: Harpsichordist, Conductor, Musicologist
- Organization: London Early Opera
- Website: bridgetcunningham.org.uk

Bridget Cunningham is a British-Irish harpsichordist, conductor and musicologist specialising in music of the Baroque period. Cunningham is Artistic Director of British period orchestra and research group London Early Opera.

== Early career ==
Cunningham was educated at Southampton University; the Royal College of Music; and Trinity Laban. She studied the harpsichord under Robert Woolley and was awarded a Junior Fellowship at the Royal College of Music. Following on from this she was a harpsichordist for the Live Music Now Scheme, performed regularly at the Handel Hendrix House and played and coached singers for the all-female choir Vivaldi’s Women.

== Performing ==
Cunningham has performed at international festivals and venues including The Innsbruck Festival, East Cork Early Music Festival, Victoria International Arts Festival in Gozo, St Martin-in-the-Fields, St John’s Smith Square, St George’s Church Hanover Square, Yale University and at Buckingham Palace for the Royal Family including the then Prince Charles.

She has performed for BBC Radio 3 In Tune BBC Radio 4 Front Row and appeared on BBC Two in Hallelujah! The story of Handel's Messiah, and on BBC Four in Vivaldi’s Women.

In November 2021 Cunningham opened the international Handel Institute conference with a harpsichord recital at the Foundling Museum and released her harpsichord album Handel’s Eight Great Harpsichord Suites.

Cunningham is an advocate for directing period orchestras and singers from the harpsichord.

== Research ==
Cunningham's research focuses on the music of George Frideric Handel and his contemporaries. She has published research on Handel’s music written and performed in Ireland alongside other Irish baroque composers. Cunningham has edited Baroque works including arias by Johann Adolph Hasse, Giovanni Porta and Giovanni Bononcini and Handel’s previously lost opera Caio Fabbricio HWV A^{9}, directing the work's modern world premiere in May 2022. In 2016 she reconstructed an eighteenth-century evening at Vauxhall Pleasure Gardens recorded by Signum Records and performed at the Oxford and Cambridge Club, Grosvenor Chapel, St George’s Church Hanover Square and St Peter’s Church Vauxhall, which featured on BBC Radio 4 Front Row.

Cunningham is a doctoral candidate in association with Open, Oxford and Cambridge Universities, with a focus on the musicology and performance of operatic music by Handel and Hasse.

== London Early Opera ==
Cunningham founded London Early Opera in 2008. She has directed LEO performances at Coram’s Fields, The Foundling Museum, St James’s Church Piccadilly, St. Peter’s Church Vauxhall, Grosvenor Chapel Mayfair, Southwark Cathedral and for the London Handel Festival.

In 2015 Cunningham launched a series of recording projects with London Early Opera and Signum Records, capturing world premiere recordings exploring Handel’s life, influences and experiences. Her 2019 album Handel’s Queens with singers Mary Bevan MBE and Lucy Crowe was shortlisted for a 2020 Gramophone Award nomination and was a CD of the month in BBC Music Magazine and Classica Magazine.

In 2017, she directed live performances of Handel’s Water Music and a new world-premiere performance of River written by a previous winner of BBC Young Composer of the Year, Grace Evangeline-Mason. This was commissioned by the BBC and performed live by London Early Opera for BBC Radio 4 on the Eras`mus Boat on the River Thames celebrating the 300th Anniversary of Handel's Water Music.

In 2022 LEO launched their recording of Handel’s Caio Fabbricio HWV A^{9} with a modern world premiere performance at St George’s Church Hanover Square, directed by Cunningham.

== Awards ==
- Worshipful Company of Musicians Award towards Fellowship at the Royal College of Music
- Royal Philharmonic Society Enterprise Fund Award
- Open, Oxford and Cambridge University Doctoral Stipend
- Finzi Trust Scholarship
- Handel Institute Research Award

== Discography ==
Title	Details
Caio Fabbricio HWV A9 by G.F. Handel	Released: 2022; Label: Signum Records
Handel’s Eight Great Harpsichord Suites	Released: 2021; Label: Signum Records
Handel’s Queens	Released: 2019; Label: Signum Records
Handel at Vauxhall: Volume 2	Released: 2017; Label: Signum Records
Handel in Ireland: Volume 1	Released: 2017; Label: Signum Records
Handel in Italy: Volume 2	Released: 2016; Label: Signum Records
Handel at Vauxhall: Volume 1	Released: 2016; Label: Signum Records
Handel in Italy: Volume 1	Released: 2015; Label: Signum Records
Thirty-odd feet below Belgium	Released: 2011; Label: Gloria Magnificat Recording Company
Ireland's Enchantment	Released: 2010; Label: Rose Street Records
Venice Revealed	Released: 2010; Label: Peter Ackroyed; Formats: DVD Release
Gloria	Released: 2009; Label: Vivaldi's Women; Formats: DVD Release
Thistle and the Rose with Fleuri	Released: 2009; Label: Rose Street Records
Oxford's Letters	Released: 2006; Label: Absolute Audio
