= Mahmal =

Ceremonial passenger-less litter used in Hajj pilgrimage

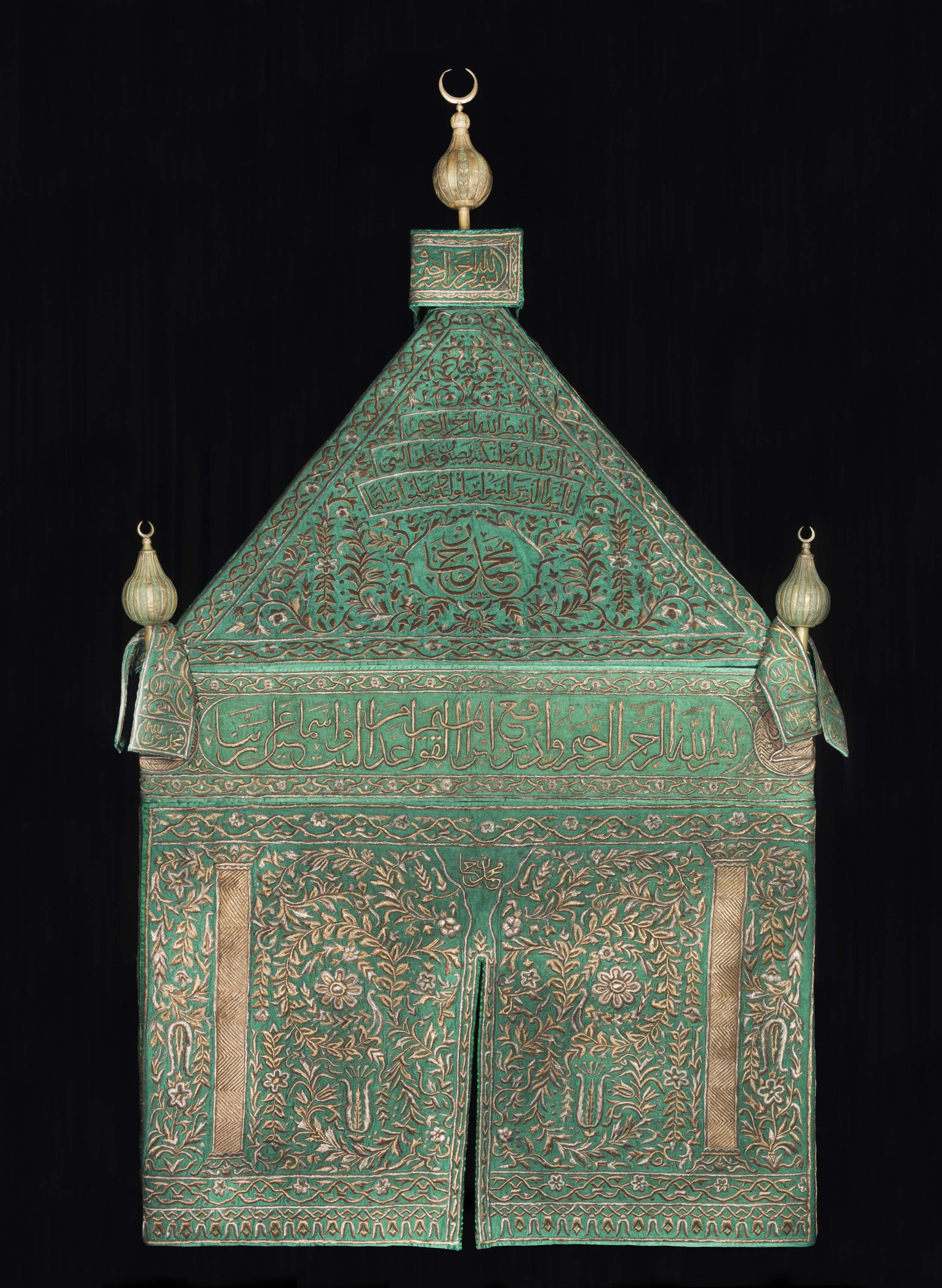
Cover for a Damascus Mahmal, Istanbul, 16th century. Khalili Collection of Hajj and the Arts of Pilgrimage

A mahmal (Arabic: مَحْمَل, romanized: maḥmal) is a ceremonial passenger-less litter that was carried on a camel among caravans of pilgrims on the Hajj, the pilgrimage to Mecca which is a sacred duty in Islam. It symbolised the political power of the sultans who sent it, demonstrating their custody of Islam's holy sites. Each mahmal had an intricately embroidered textile cover, or sitr. The tradition dates back at least to the 13th century and ended in the mid-20th. There are many descriptions and photographs of mahmals from 19th century observers of the Hajj.

== History ==
The word "mahmal" comes from the root حمل (ḥ-m-l, "to carry"). A mahmal consists of a wooden frame made to fit on a camel, with a pointed top. There were textile coverings placed over it: an ornate processional covering and others for everyday use. These coverings are known as the kiswah or sitr al-mahmal. The earliest surviving covers, from the Mamluk Sultanate, are yellow, but later instances are red or green. The embroidered decoration would include the tughra (seal) of the Sultan as well as verses from the Quran.

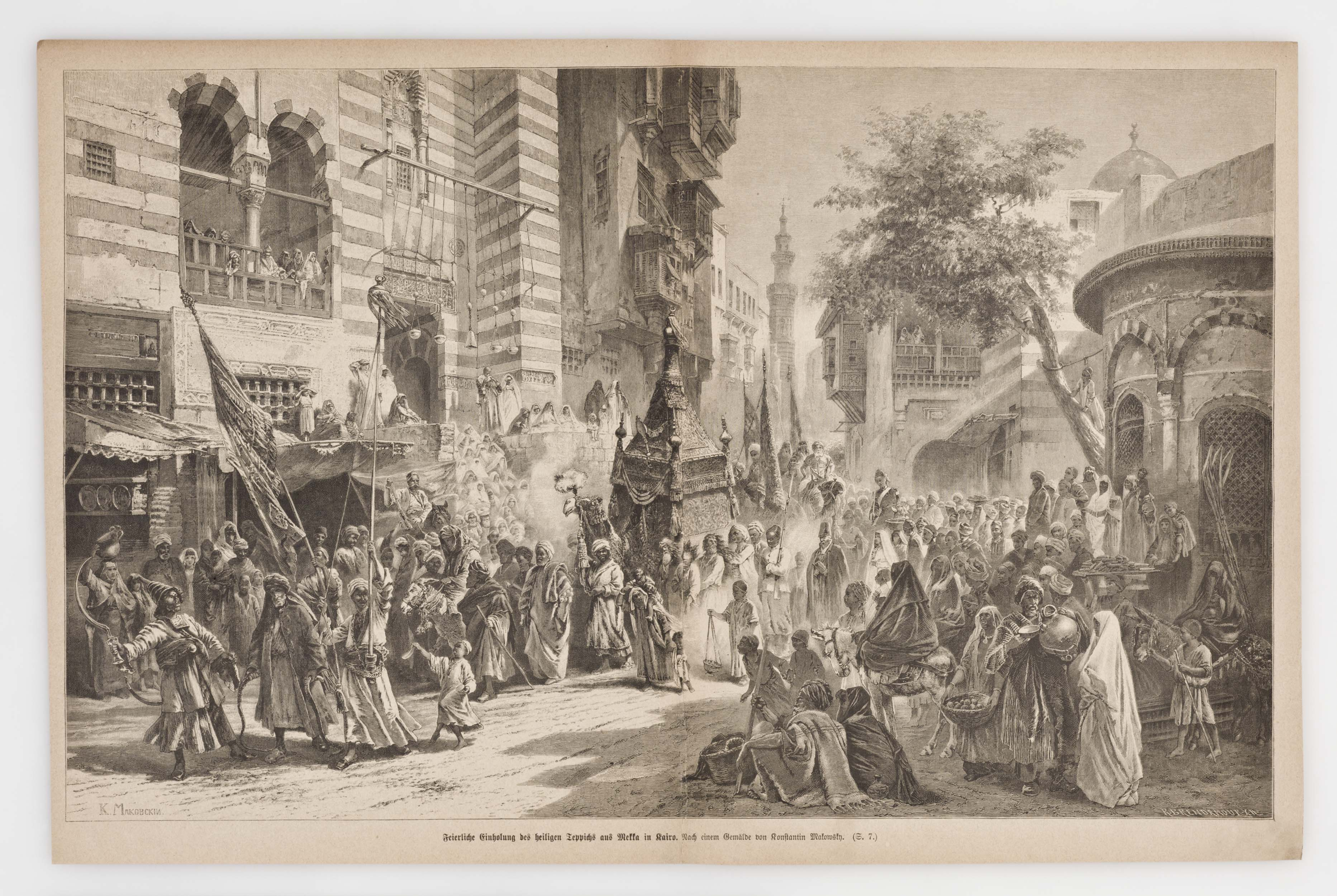
The return of the mahmal from Mecca to Cairo. Wood engraving, 1893

The first recorded sending of a mahmal was by Baibars, who was Sultan of Egypt from 1260 to 1277. Mahmals were sent from Cairo, Damascus, Yemen, Hyderabad, Darfur, and the Timurid Empire in different periods. Although the main pilgrim caravan from Egypt departed from Cairo, a separate caravan with its own mahmal departed annually from Asyut from the late 14th century.

On 18 June 1926, Egyptian soldiers playing music while escorting the mahmal, were confronted by angry Najdi Muslims, who disliked the mahmal as an innovation (Bid'ah) and considered music un-Islamic. The Egyptians fired on them, killing 25. The tradition of sending annual mahmals to Mecca ended in 1926, although they were paraded in Cairo until 1952.

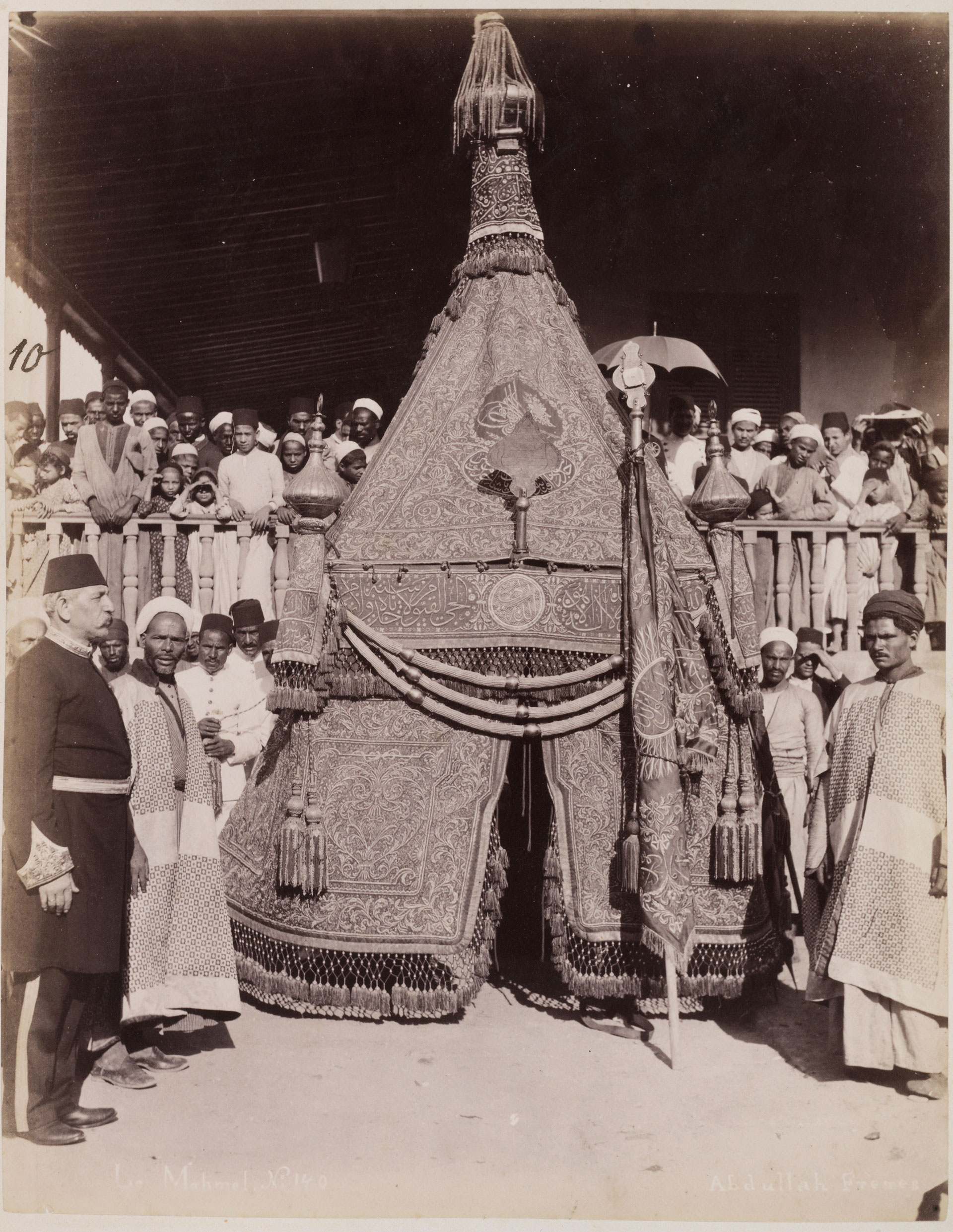
Mahmal, Egypt, circa 1886. Photograph by the Abdullah Frères

The arrival of the mahmal in Mecca was a significant occasion which local people and pilgrims came out to watch. Before entry to the city, the simple textiles which had covered the mahmal on its journey across the desert or sea were replaced with the ornate, colourful kiswah. Mahmals from different countries would vie for the best position in front of the Kaaba. A mahmal returning from Mecca to its city of origin was regarded as carrying barakah (blessing) which could be transferred by touch. As the procession returned to a city, parents brought out their children to touch the mahmal, and people briefly put their handkerchiefs inside it.

== Origins ==
The tradition's origin is not known for certain. The Turkish traveler Evliya Çelebi wrote that the earliest mahmals carried relics of the prophet Muhammad including his shoes, gown and bowl, and hence that the mahmal was seen as representing the prophet's grave. Another theory is that Shajar al-Durr, the first Sultana, made the Hajj journey in a colourful litter and that subsequent leaders kept up the tradition, with the litter empty, after her death in the 13th century.

== Contents of the mahmal ==
Some sources say the mahmal was completely empty, while others describe it containing a Quran or other holy book. An anonymous account from 1575 describes a mahmal carrying "the Quran all written in great letters of gold". In the Anis Al-Hujjaj (Pilgrim's companion), a detailed record of a Hajj undertaken in 1677, the Damascus mahmal is depicted containing a Quran on a stand. Swiss traveler John Lewis Burckhardt observed the Egyptian caravan in 1814 and wrote that a book of prayers, but not the Quran, would be carried in the mahmal. On its return from Mecca, people would kiss and rub their foreheads against the book to receive blessings. In the 1830s, British traveler Edward William Lane described a mahmal that was empty but had two copies of the Quran — one as a scroll and the other bound as a book — attached externally to the top of the mahmal in silver-gilt cases.

== Gallery ==
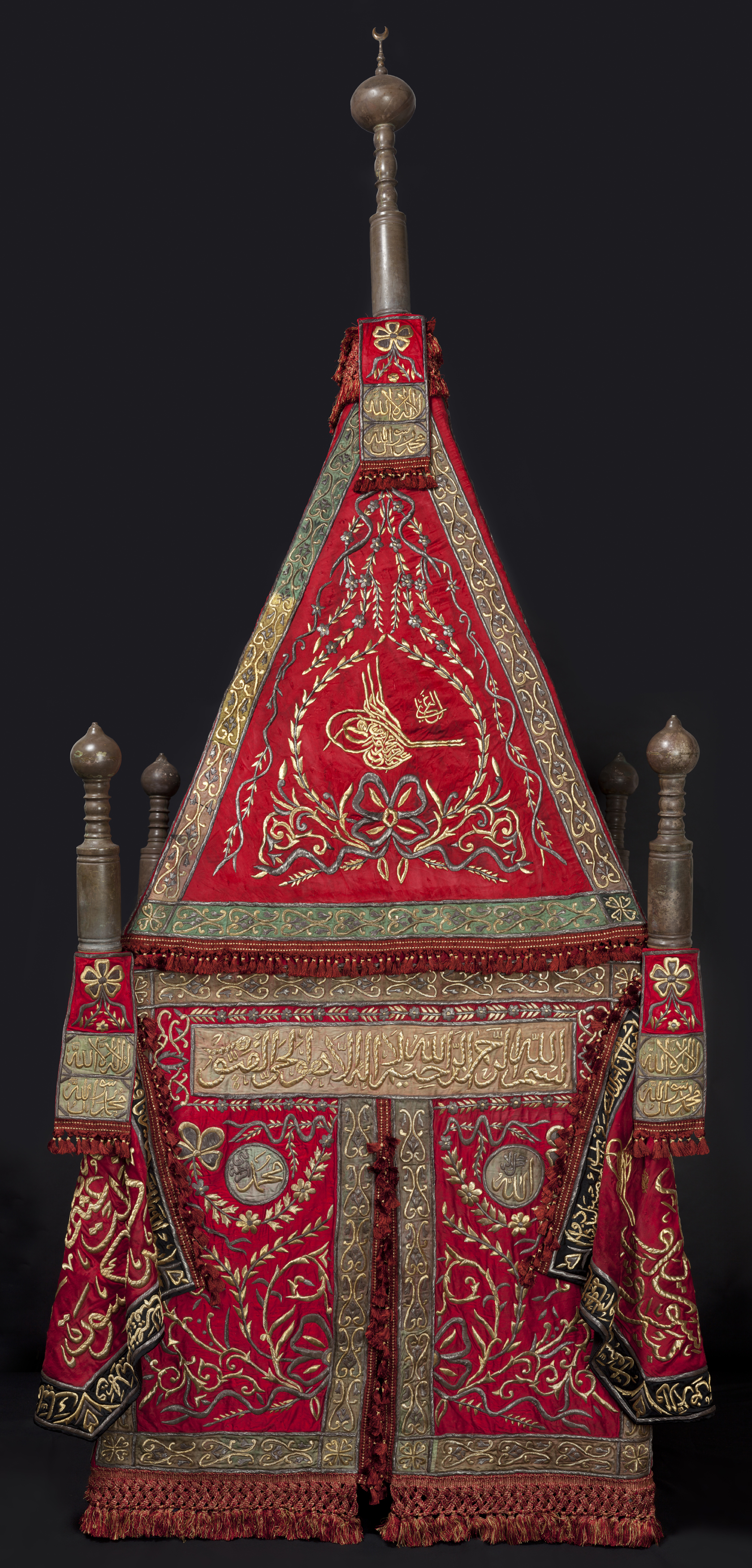
Mahmal cover and banners, Cairo, 1867–76

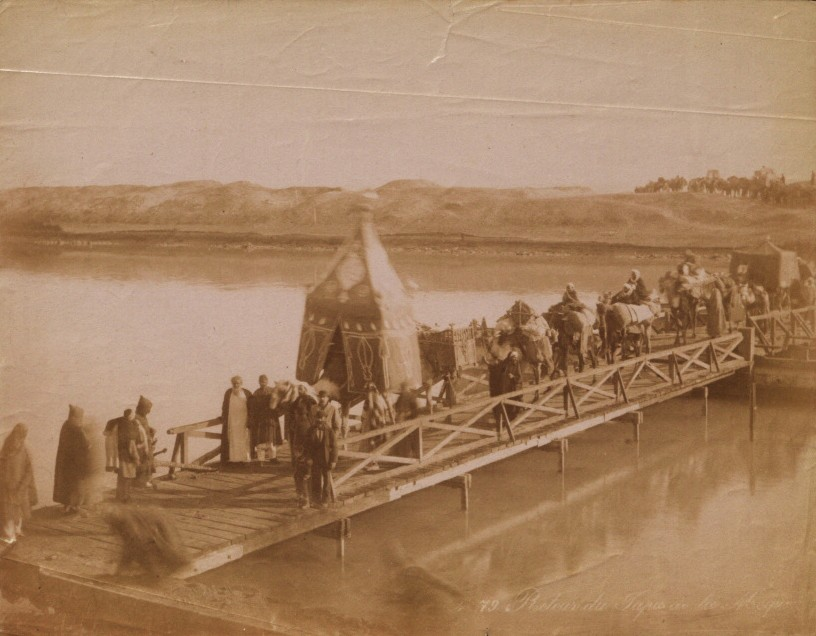
The Egyptian mahmal and caravan crossing the Suez Canal, 1880s

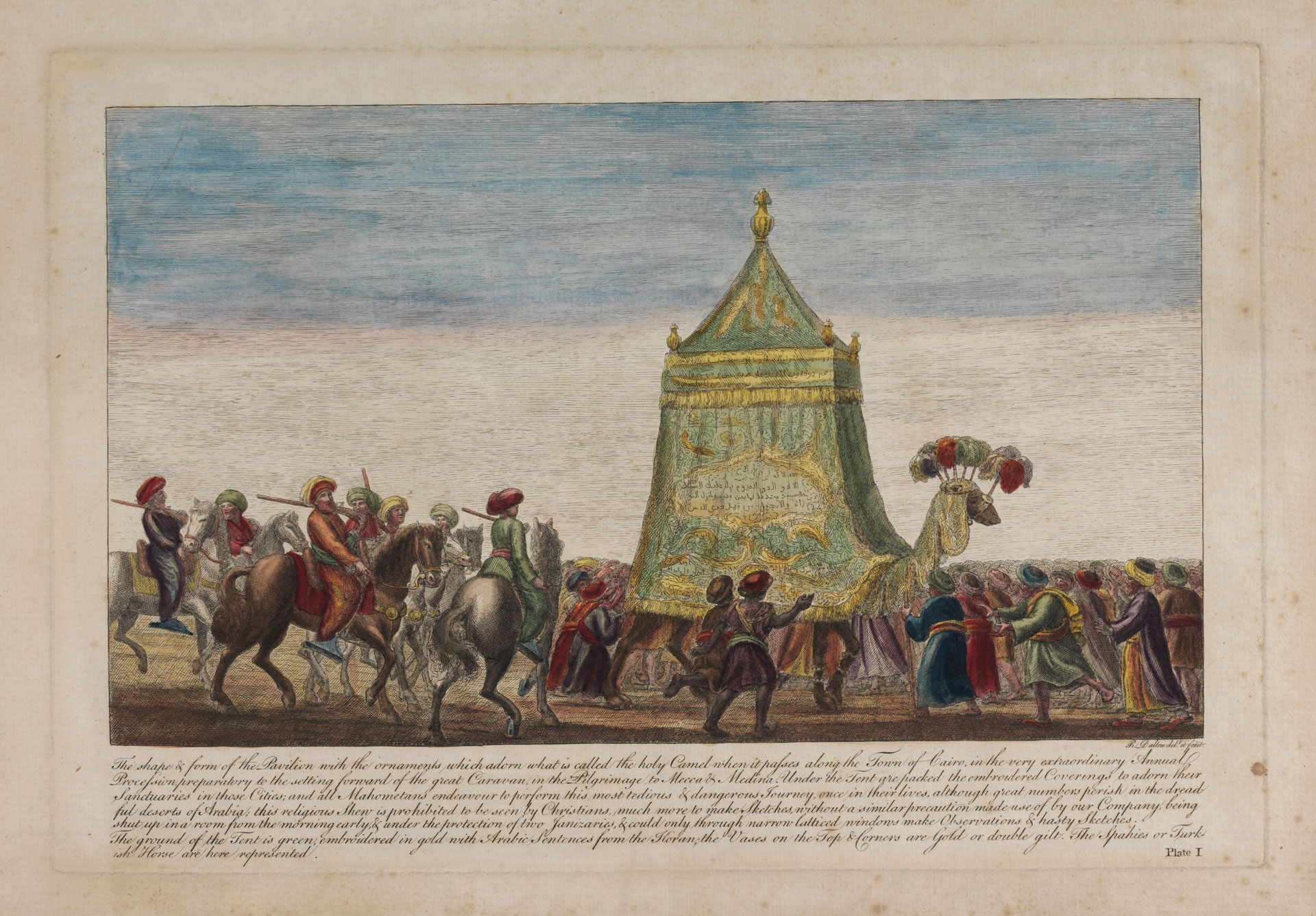
The mahmal passing through Cairo: 1791 illustration by the English engraver Richard Dalton

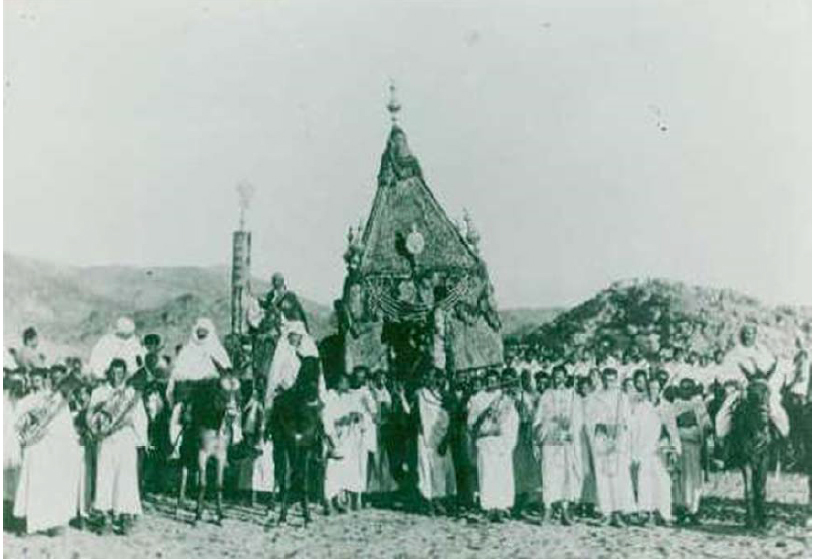
Mahmal of Hussein bin Ali, circa 1890

Mahmal from the Sultanate of Darfur passing through Omdurman, 1904

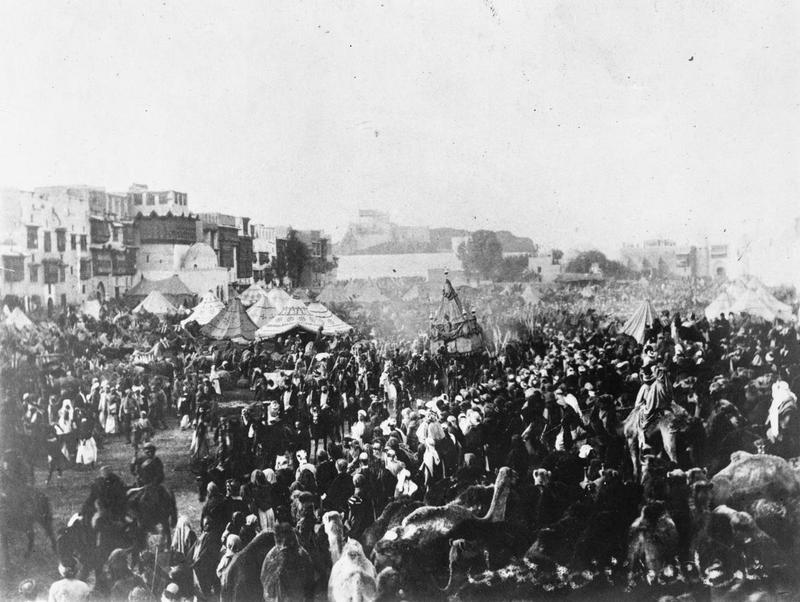
Mahmal of Hussein bin Ali in Mecca, 1916-1918
