= The Madonna and Sleeping Child with the Infant St John the Baptist =

Painting by Annibale Carracci

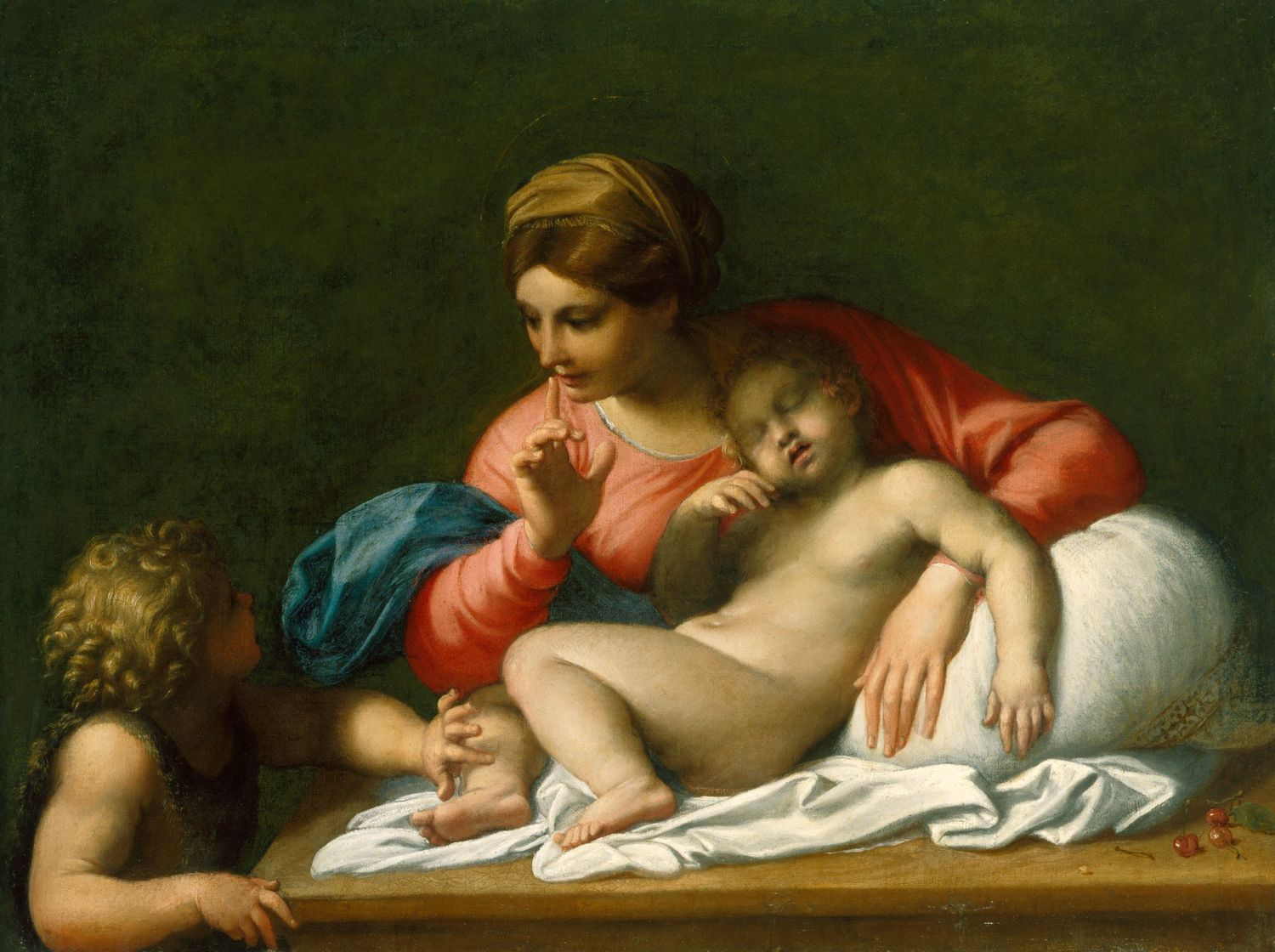
The Madonna and Sleeping Child with the Infant St John the Baptist (c. 1599–1600)

The Madonna and Sleeping Child with the Infant St John the Baptist or Il Silenzio (The Silence) is oil-on-canvas painting by the Italian Baroque master Annibale Carracci, now in the Royal Collection. It is currently on display in Hampton Court Palace.

It was produced around 1599–1600 whilst Annibale was working on the Palazzo Farnese ceiling paintings in Rome. Intended as a small devotional work, it measures only 51.2 x 68.4 cm. A preparatory sketch for the whole composition survives in black chalk, ink, and pen, whilst John the Baptist's pointing gesture is similar to that of the right-hand putto in the contemporaneous Pietà, with both paintings using a pyramidical composition. Some pentimenti are visible to X-ray, infra-red reflectography, and the naked eye.

The work was much copied and referenced, most notably around 1605 by Domenichino (Louvre). It was recorded in inventories of the Farnese Collection at Palazzo del Giardino in Parma in 1678 and circa 1680 before being acquired in 1766 for George III by Richard Dalton, who then also owned the black chalk, pen and ink sketch for it. The following year Francis Cotes produced a pastel portrait of George's wife Queen Charlotte holding their daughter Charlotte, Princess Royal and making a gesture similar to the Virgin Mary's in tribute to the acquisition of Il Silenzio.

Carracci's work was initially hung at Buckingham House, where Francesco Bartolozzi engraved it in 1768. George's son the Prince Regent had Henry Bone produce an enamel-on-copper copy of the work in 1814, whilst the original was on show at Windsor Castle when Charles Wild produced the illustrations for William Henry Pyne's Royal Residences, published in 1819.

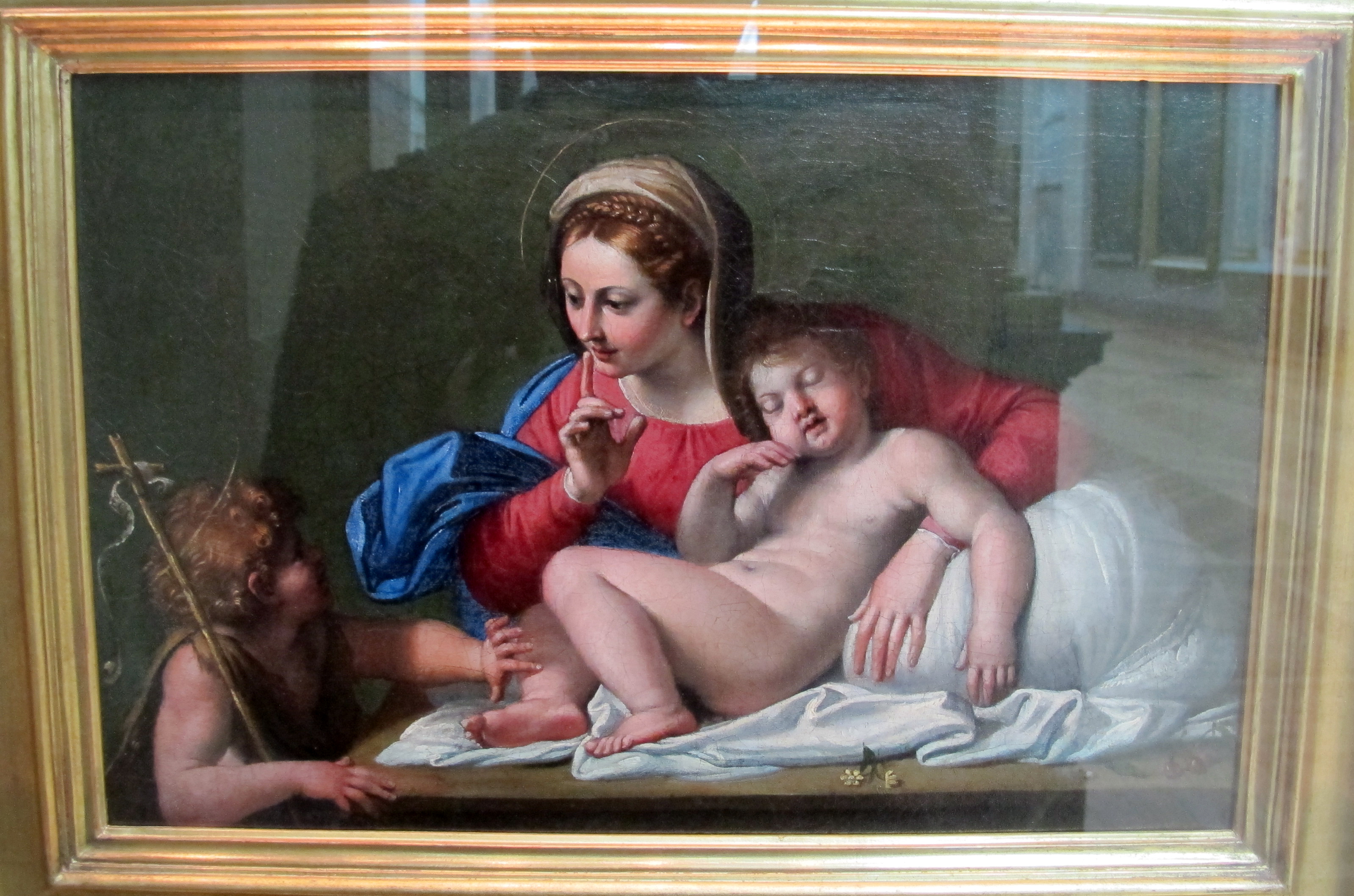
Domenichino's copy

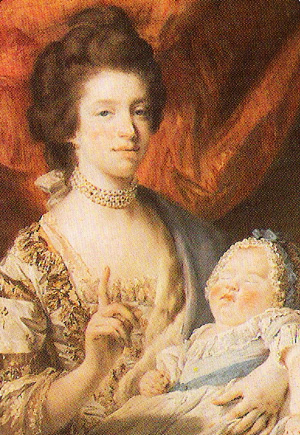
Cotes' pastel

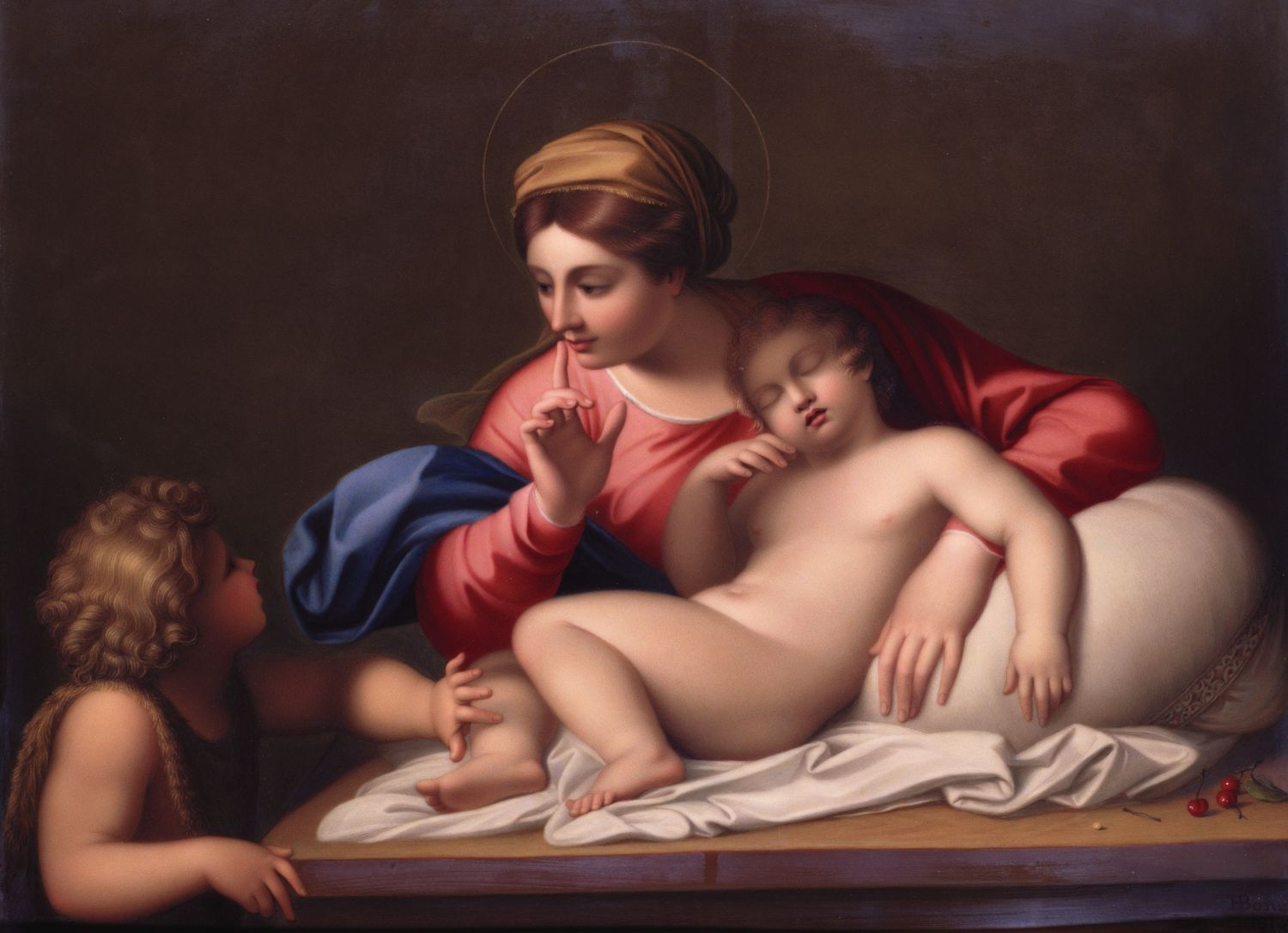
Bone's copy

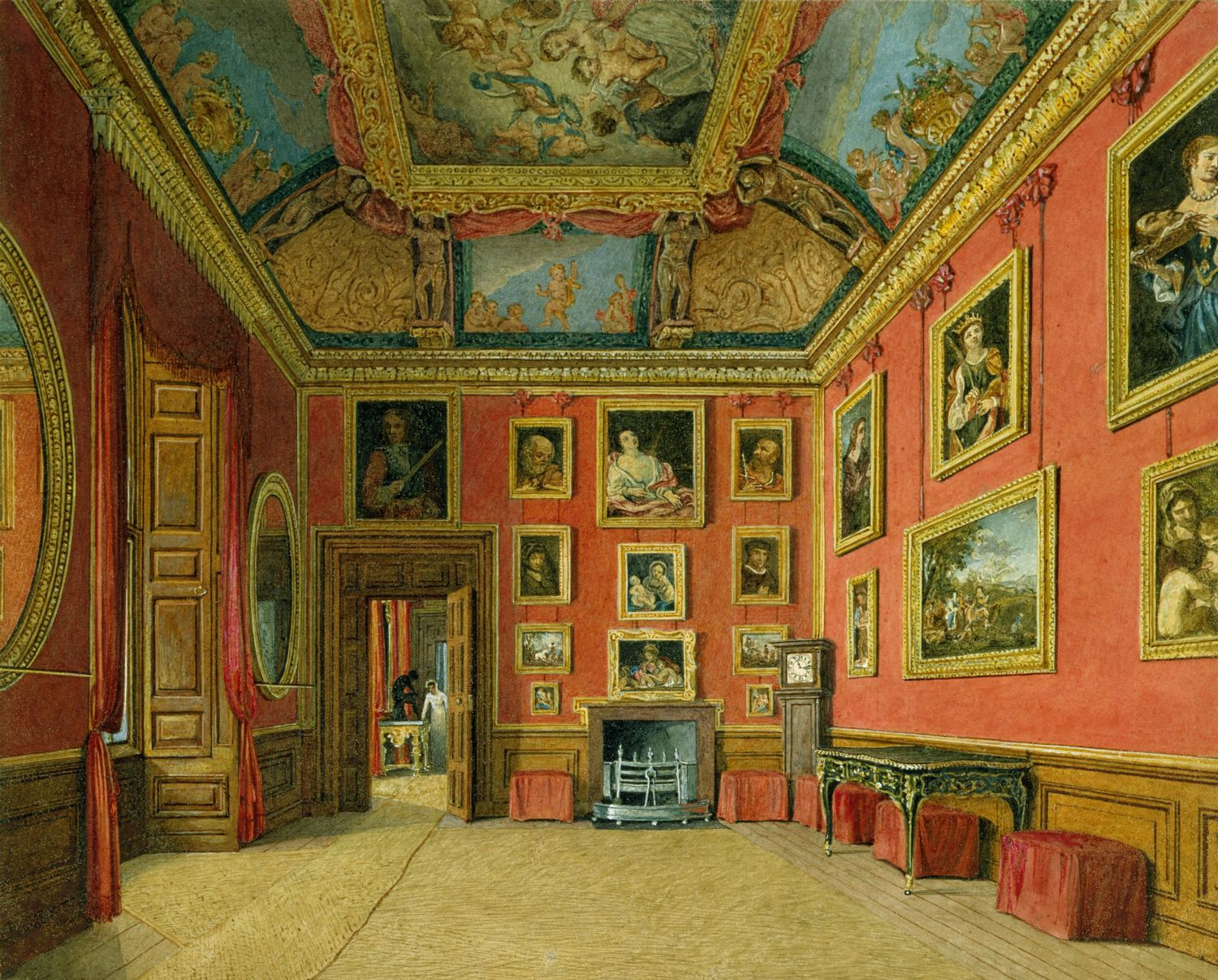
The illustration in Pyne, showing Madonna above the fireplace
