= Richard Dalton (librarian) =

- Born: 1715
- Died: 1791 (aged 75–76)

Richard Dalton (c. 1715 – 1791) was an English drawer (artist), engraver, and royal librarian. He later became an art dealer.

== Life ==
Born about 1715, he was the younger son of the Rev. John Dalton of Whitehaven in Cumberland; John Dalton, D.D., the poet, was his older brother. He trained as an artist and went to Rome, where he studied under Agostino Masucci.

In 1749, Dalton travelled with Roger Kynaston and John Frederick to Naples, South Italy, and Sicily, where they joined a party consisting of James Caulfeild, 1st Earl of Charlemont, Francis Pierpoint Burton, and others. Dalton then accompanied Charlemont on his tour to Constantinople, Greece, and Egypt.

Dalton managed to obtain the position of librarian to George III when the future king was Prince of Wales, and, after the king's accession, continued in his post through the favour of the Earl of Bute. He was subsequently appointed keeper of the pictures, and antiquarian to his majesty.

Dalton was sent abroad to purchase works of art for the king, such as Carracci's The Madonna and Sleeping Child with the Infant St John the Baptist, acquired in 1766. At Venice in 1763, he made the acquaintance of Francesco Bartolozzi the engraver, and obtained for him an introduction to England as a rival to Sir Robert Strange, a Jacobite (who accused Dalton of using undue influence with the king, in order to assist Bartolozzi). Dalton was one of the original committee who in 1755 drew up the first project for the establishment of a Royal Academy of Fine Arts in England. He was one of the original members of the Incorporated Society of Artists in 1765, and became their treasurer. He purchased a large house in Pall Mall, to be used as a print warehouse; but as this did not succeed he established there the first nucleus of an academy of arts, under the protection of the king, and induced the St. Martin's Lane Academy to transfer its students and equipment there. Dalton later disposed of the premises to James Christie, who set up as an auctioneer there.

Dalton continued to use his influence with the king for the creation of a Royal Academy of Arts, and, when the Royal Academy was really started, he was elected its antiquarian. Dalton died at his rooms in St. James's Palace on 7 February 1791. He was elected a Fellow of the Society of Antiquaries of London in 1767.

== Works ==
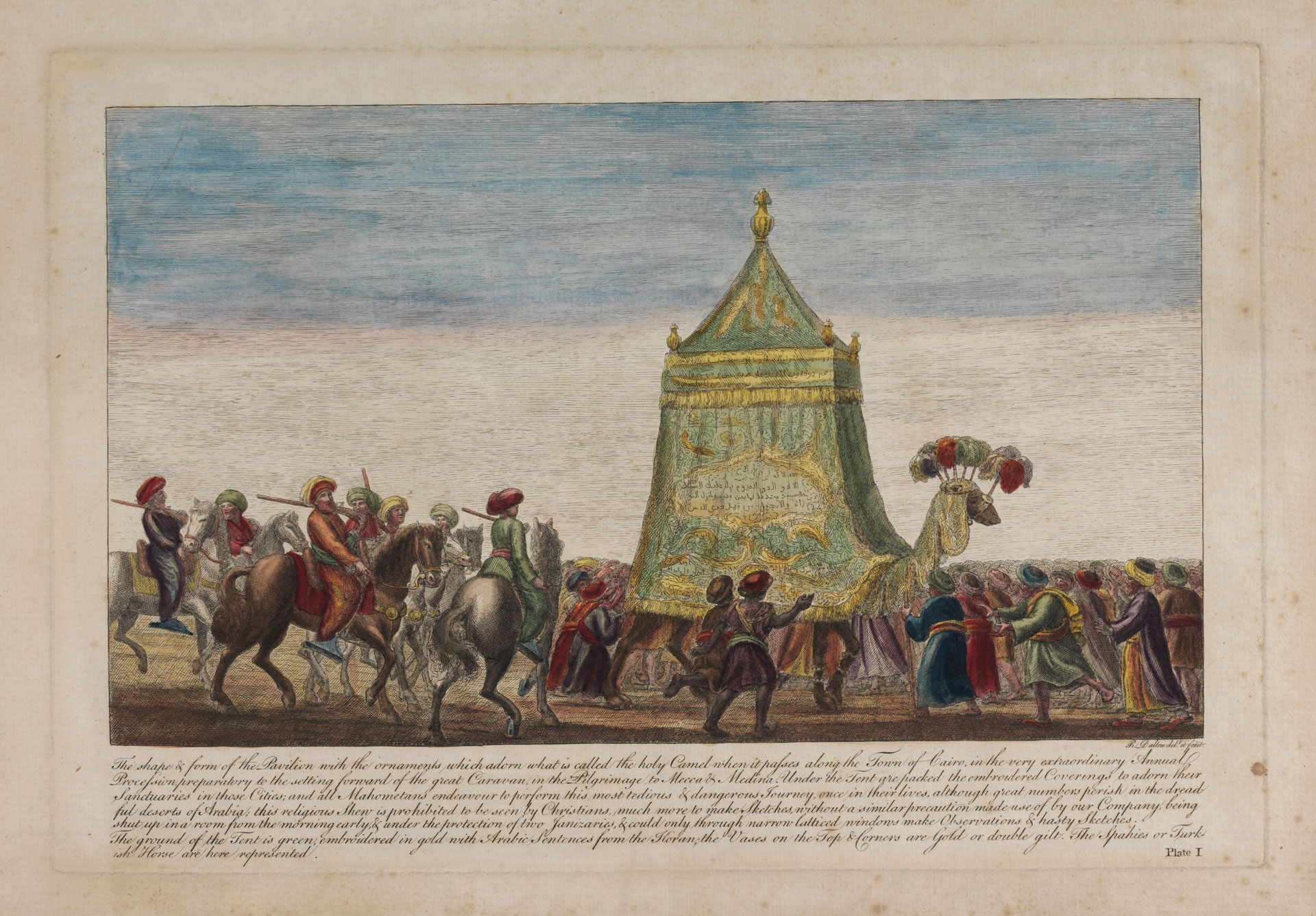
The Mahmal passing through Cairo. Engraving by Dalton, now in the Khalili Collection of Hajj and the Arts of Pilgrimage.

Dalton was the first Englishman to make drawings of the monuments of ancient art in these countries: some of these he etched and engraved himself. A Selection from the Antiquities of Athens was therefore the first publication of its kind, but it was surpassed by the publications of James Stuart and Nicholas Revett. Dalton published some further sets of engravings of Monuments, Manners, Customs in Turkey and Egypt. Dalton was also the first artist to engrave the series of portraits drawn by Hans Holbein, which had been discovered by Queen Caroline at Kensington Palace.

== Family ==
On 25 June 1764, Dalton married Esther Deheulle, a silkweaver from Spitalfields. They had no children.

== Notes ==
Attribution

This article incorporates text from a publication now in the public domain: Lee, Sidney, ed. (1901). "Dalton, Richard". Dictionary of National Biography (1st supplement). Vol. 2. London: Smith, Elder & Co.
