= Grace-Evangeline Mason =

British composer (born 1994)

- Born: October 1994 (age 31)
- Education: Royal Northern College of Music, Somerville College, Oxford, Royal Academy of Music
- Occupation: Composer
- Website: graceevangelinemason.com

Grace-Evangeline Mason (born October 1994) is a British composer of contemporary classical music.

== Early life and education ==
Mason studied composition at the Royal Northern College of Music, Manchester, under Professor Emily Howard and Professor Gary Carpenter, where she held a scholarship and was awarded the Rosamond Prize (2016). She began her studies at the college as a member of their Junior Department, during which time she was a member of the National Youth Orchestra of Great Britain. She won the 2013 BBC Young Composer Competition, formerly known as the BBC Proms Inspire Young Composer Competition, for her piece Convergence, and subsequently became an ambassador for the competition and its workshops in the following years. Following her studies at the RNCM, where she was made an associate in 2021, she studied at Somerville College, Oxford under Professor Robert Saxton and completed her doctorate at the Royal Academy of Music, London.

== Career ==
In 2017, whilst still an undergraduate at the RNCM, she was co-commissioned by BBC Radio 4's Front Row programme and The Proms to compose her work entitled River, which was written to celebrate the 300th anniversary of George Frideric Handel's Water Music. The piece was premiered live on BBC Radio 4 from a stationary boat on the River Thames by London Early Opera, imitating the premiere performance of Water Music 300 years previously. River was subsequently performed at the Proms by Royal Northern Sinfonia under Nicholas McGegan in Kingston upon Hull, which was the first time the Proms had included a concert outside London since 1930. In 2018, the piece received its United States premiere at the Norfolk Chamber Music Festival by the Philharmonia Baroque Orchestra.

In November 2017, the BBC Philharmonic performed her orchestral work Kintsukuroi: (Golden Repair), conducted by Mark Heron, in a special joint concert with Psappha New Music Ensemble for BBC Radio 3 broadcast as part of the biennial New Music North West Festival.

Mason is the recipient of prizes and awards such as the Royal Liverpool Philharmonic's Christopher Brooks Prize 2017 and the prestigious Royal Philharmonic Society Composition Prize 2018.

Her debut chamber opera in one act entitled The Yellow Wallpaper, for which Mason wrote the libretto based on the short story of the same name by Charlotte Perkins Gilman, was produced by the Helios Collective to receive its premiere performance at the English National Opera's Lilian Baylis House in 2016.

Mason's music has been included in events and festivals such as BBC Radio 3's Young Artist Day, in which her work Diamond Dust II for Clarinet in Bb and Piano was broadcast live, her setting of Psalm 93, The Lord Is, was premiered in the London Festival of Contemporary Church Music 2017 by the Sarum Consort, and in the Open Circuit Festival 2016 in which her piece Let The Rain Kiss You, inspired by the poem April Rain Song, by Langston Hughes was performed by trombonist, John Kenny.

Her music has been performed by members of the BBC Symphony Orchestra, the Aurora Orchestra, and Ensemble 10/10. In 2017, Mason was selected to write her orchestral piece Beneath the Silken Silence for the London Symphony Orchestra as part of their Panufnik Composer's Scheme, she was then subsequently commissioned to write her work FAFAIA (2018) for their Community Choir.

2021 saw the premiere of her orchestral work The Imagined Forest co-commissioned by BBC Radio 3 and the Royal Liverpool Philharmonic Orchestra under Domingo Hindoyan in his first concert as their new chief conductor, at the Royal Albert Hall, London. The work has since had further performances in Liverpool, followed by its Norwegian premiere at the Oslo Opera House under Leo Hussain in March 2022, Italian premiere as part of MITO SettembreMusica in Lingotto, Torino and in Milano at the world-renowned Teatro alla Scala both under John Axelrod in September 2022, and its German premiere at Theater Magdeburg under Ilya Ram in November 2022. Conductor Jonathon Heyward presented the Finnish premiere of the work with Lahti Symphony Orchestra in November 2022, and the US premiere with the Baltimore Symphony Orchestra in May 2022 during his first season as their new music director-designate.

Conductor Mark Wigglesworth presented further performances of The Imagined Forest with the Bournemouth Symphony Orchestra in November 2023 with plans to give the Australian premiere with the Adelaide Symphony Orchestra in September 2023. This led to Wigglesworth presenting the premiere of Grace-Evangeline Mason's Ablaze the Moon, commissioned by BBC Radio 3 as part of the BBC Proms, performed by the BBC Philharmonic at the Royal Albert Hall, London, in July 2023.

She was named in The Times 2020 Calendar of the Arts as the classical music 'Face to Watch'.

== Selected works ==
=== Orchestral works ===
- An Everywhere of Silver (2026) – for orchestra
- The Hart (2025) – for soprano and orchestra
- Ablaze the Moon (2023) – for orchestra
- The Imagined Forest (2021) – for orchestra
- Fireworks (2018) – for soprano voice and orchestra
- Kintsukuroi: (Golden Repair) (2016) – for orchestra

=== Solo/chamber works ===
- The Water Garden (2023) – for wind dectet and harp
- My Thoughts Fly In At Your Window (2020) – for large chamber ensemble
- Midnight Spires (2019) – for string quartet
- Glass Cathedrals (2019) – for harp
- Into The Abyss, I Throw Roses (2018) – for string trio
- Upon Weightless Wings (2018) – for large chamber ensemble
- River (2017) – for baroque chamber orchestra

=== Choral works ===
- Hour of Stars (2026) – for SATB choir, brass septet, harp and percussion
- A Memory of the Ocean (2023) – for SATB choir, piano and cello
- A Song of Christ's Glory (2019) – for SATB choir
- Fafaia (2018) – for SATB choir and piano
- The Lord Is (2015) – for SATB choir
- Faint Flight (2014) – for SATB choir

=== Opera ===
- The Yellow Wallpaper (2016) – chamber opera in one act
