= Comus (Milton) =

1637 masque by John Milton

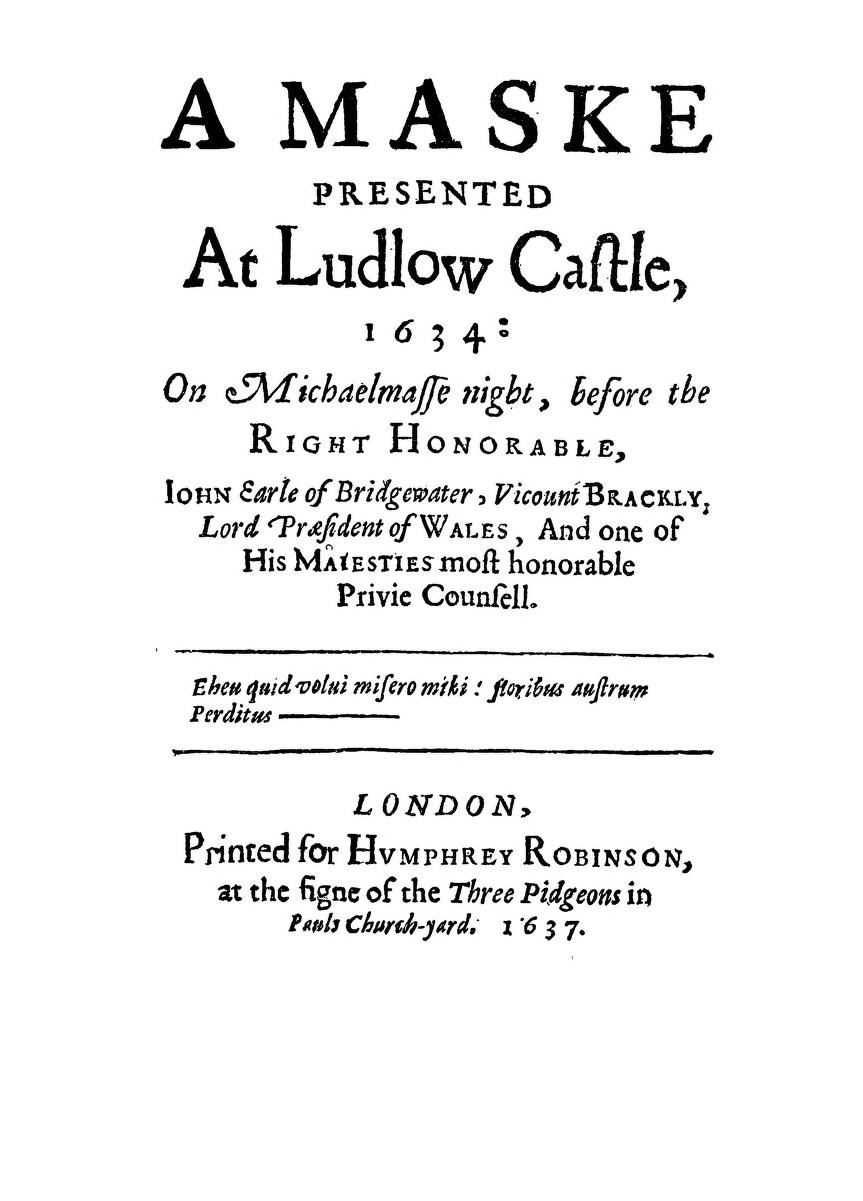
- Title page of the first edition (1637), published anonymously
- Author: John Milton
- Language: English
- Genre: masque
- Publisher: Humphrey Robinson (original)
- Publication date: 1637
- Publication place: England
- Media type: Print
- Text: Comus at Wikisource

Comus (A Masque Presented at Ludlow Castle, 1634) is a masque in honour of chastity written by John Milton. It was first presented on Michaelmas 1634 before John Egerton, 1st Earl of Bridgewater, at Ludlow Castle in celebration of the Earl's new post as Lord President of Wales.

The masque is known colloquially as Comus, but the full title in its first publication is A Maske presented at Ludlow Castle, 1634: on Michaelmasse night, before the Right Honorable, John Earle of Bridgewater, Viscount Brackly, Lord President of Wales, and one of His Majesties most honorable privie counsell. It was performed for the Earl of Bridgewater on 29 September 1634. The performance also featured Egerton's two sons as the Elder Brother and Second Brother, and his daughter Alice as the Lady.

Comus was printed anonymously in 1637 in a quarto issued by bookseller Humphrey Robinson. Milton included the work in his Poems of 1645 and 1673. His text was adapted for a highly successful masque by musician Thomas Arne in 1738, which ran for more than 70 years in London. There were also later settings of episodes from Milton's masque by George Frideric Handel and Hugh Wood.

== Plot ==
The plot concerns two brothers and their sister, simply called "the Lady", lost in a journey through the woods. The Lady becomes fatigued, and the brothers wander off in search of sustenance.

While alone, she encounters the debauched Comus, a character inspired by the god of revelry (Ancient Greek: Κῶμος, Kōmos), who is disguised as a villager and claims he will lead her to her brothers. Deceived by his amiable countenance, the Lady follows him, only to be captured, brought to his pleasure palace and victimised by his necromancy. Seated on an enchanted chair, with "gums of glutinous heat", she is immobilised, and Comus accosts her while with one hand he holds a necromancer's wand and with the other he offers a vessel with a drink that would overpower her. Comus urges the Lady to "be not coy" and drink from his magical cup (representing sexual pleasure and intemperance), but she repeatedly refuses, arguing for the virtuousness of temperance and chastity. Within view at his palace is an array of cuisine intended to arouse the Lady's appetites and desires. Despite being restrained against her will, she continues to exercise right reason (recta ratio) in her disputation with Comus, thereby manifesting her freedom of mind. Whereas the would-be seducer argues appetites and desires issuing from one's nature are "natural" and therefore licit, the Lady contends that only rational self-control is enlightened and virtuous. To be self-indulgent and intemperate, she adds, is to forfeit one's higher nature and to yield to baser impulses. In this debate the Lady and Comus signify, respectively, soul and body, ratio and libido, sublimation and sensuality, virtue and vice, moral rectitude and immoral depravity. In line with the theme of the journey that distinguishes Comus, the Lady has been deceived by the guile of a treacherous character, temporarily waylaid, and besieged by sophistry that is disguised as wisdom.

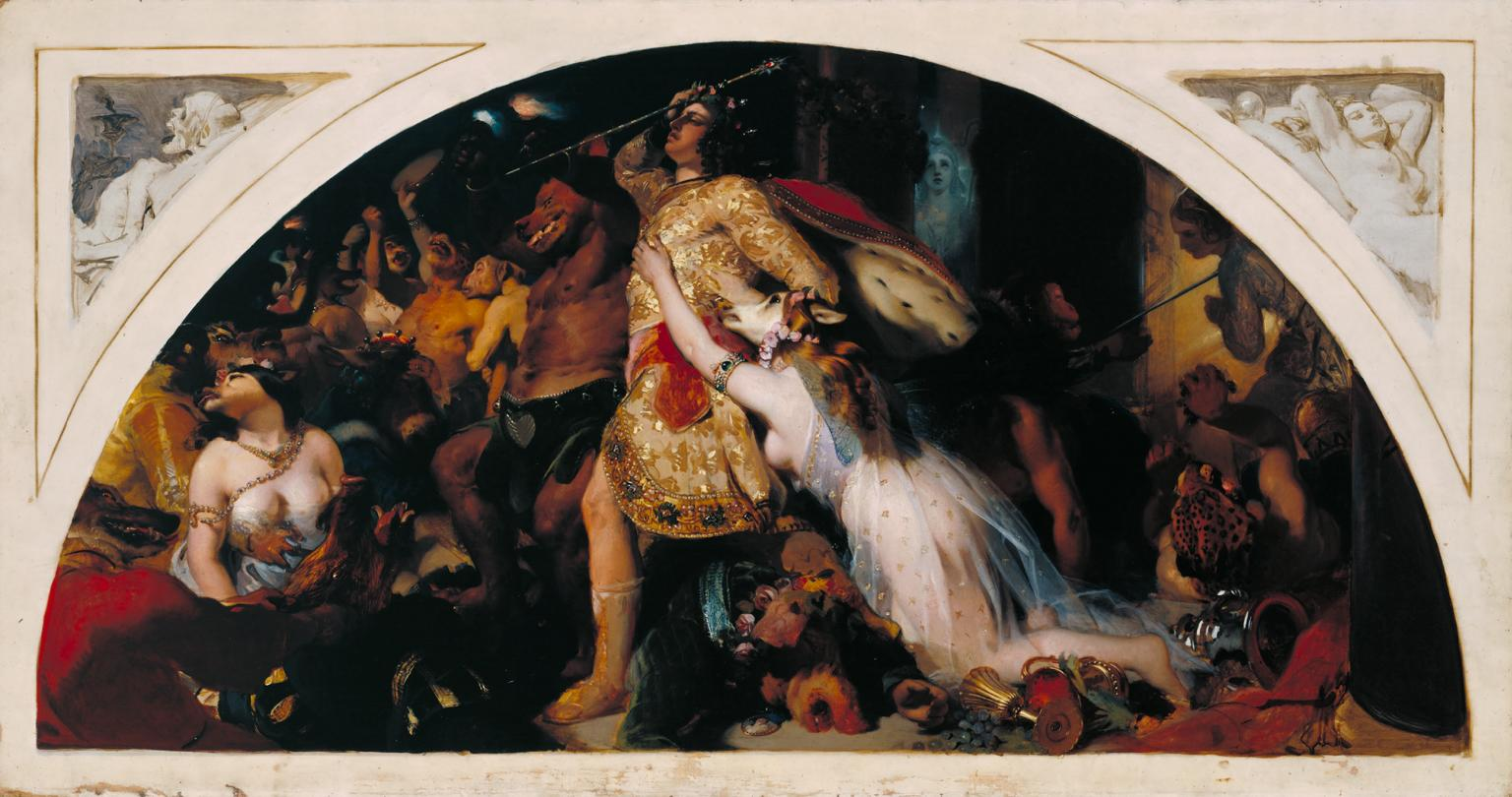
The Defeat of Comus, by Sir Edwin Landseer, 1843 (Tate)

Meanwhile, her brothers, searching for her, come across the Attendant Spirit, an angelic figure sent to aid them, who takes the form of a shepherd and tells them how to defeat Comus. As the Lady continues to assert her freedom of mind and to exercise her free will by resistance and even defiance, she is rescued by the Attendant Spirit along with her brothers, who chase off Comus. The Lady remains magically bound to her chair. With a song, the Spirit conjures the water nymph Sabrina who frees the Lady on account of her steadfast virtue. She and her brothers are reunited with their parents in a triumphal celebration, which signifies the heavenly bliss awaiting the wayfaring soul that prevails over trials and travails, whether these are the threats posed by overt evil or the blandishments of temptation.

== Comus and the masque genre ==
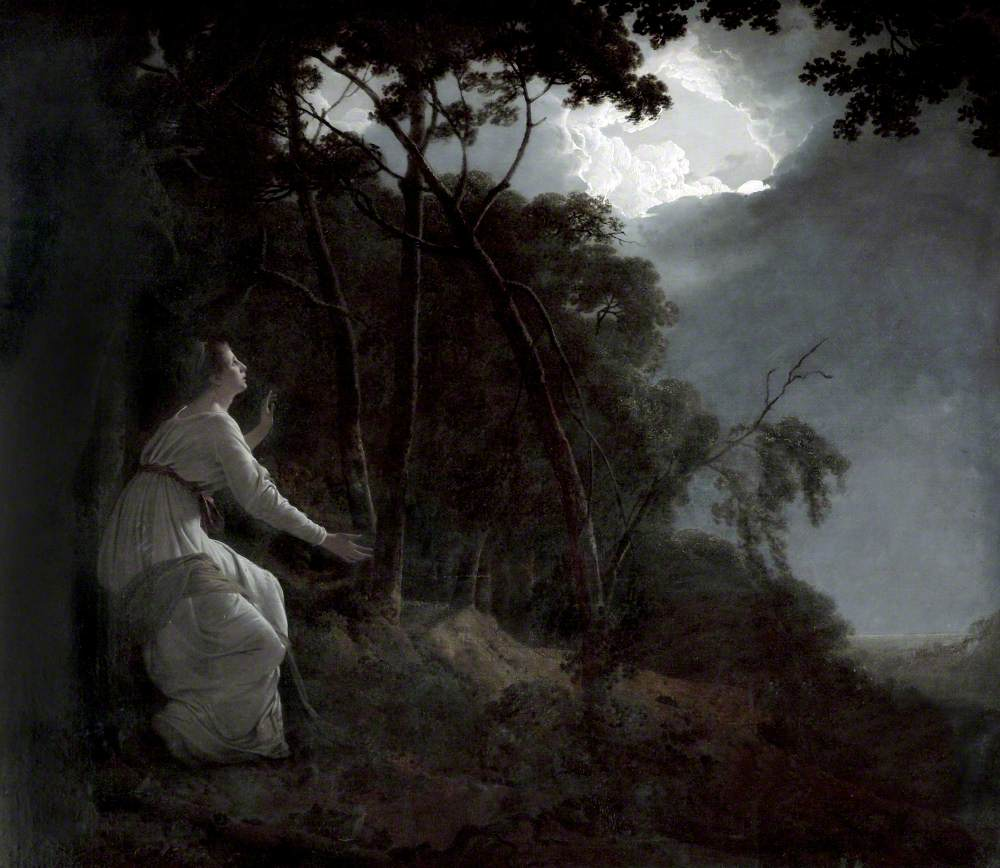
The Lady in Milton's Comus by Joseph Wright of Derby, 1785

Masques were a favourite court celebration dating from at least the reign of Elizabeth I, but became very popular under the Stuarts. The main parts were often played by courtiers, nobles and sometimes even the royals. In fact, Caroline masques (of which Comus is an example) frequently featured the King Charles I and Queen (Henrietta Maria), as they were far more interested in becoming involved than King James and his queen Anne had been.

This masque was not performed at the court, however, but at the home of Lord Bridgewater, Ludlow Castle. It was commissioned to celebrate the appointment of Lord Bridgewater to the post of Lord President of Wales. References to this are clearly evident in the text, such as the Attendant Spirit's reference to the children's father's "new-entrusted sceptre" in his opening speech.

Bridgewater's own children were the principal actors in this masque, including his 15 year-old daughter, Alice Egerton. The Puritan Milton's use of the genre, however, may be seen as an attempt for him to "reclaim" masque, which was associated with the perceived debauchery of the royal court, for godly or virtuous purposes. Rather than praising an aristocrat, the famous concluding lines of the masque, recited by the Attendant Spirit, urge

Mortals that would follow me,
Love virtue, she alone is free,
She can teach ye how to climb
Higher than the Sphery chime;
Or if Virtue feeble were,
Heav'n itself would stoop to her (ll. 1018–1023).

Comus was influenced by a prior masque, Aurelian Townshend's Tempe Restored, which had been staged at the Palace of Whitehall in London in February 1632. Both Henry Lawes and Alice Egerton, the Earl's daughter who played the Lady, had performed in Townshend's masque.

Milton's title for the masque was not Comus (this was imposed later by scholars), but A Mask, Presented at Ludlow Castle. Creaser notes that it had become old-fashioned by the 1630s to use an occasional title such as this (consider other masque titles of the time such as Carew's Coelum Britanicum and Tempe Restored, etc.) This shows that Milton wanted to specifically draw attention to his work as a masque, asking the reader to hold in their minds all that this signified, as he consciously used and twisted the conventions of the genre to put across his particular message. For example, his audience would have been expecting, based on other masques of this time, that the antimasque would be dispelled by virtue (usually embodied by the King and Queen). Yet in Comus the Lady's virtue is not enough to save her: she is unable to dismiss Comus on her own. Even the heroic virtue of her brothers is not enough. Comus escapes rather than actually being defeated.

Many have read the intervention of Sabrina as divine assistance being sent, showing that earthly virtue is relatively weak, and certainly not worthy of the exaltation given it in contemporary masques. Barbara Lewalski comments that the character of Sabrina was apparently not played by a noble, but by one of the actors (we can assume this because no-one is listed as playing this character in the dramatis personae), so it is actually a commoner who holds the position of most power.

=== Castlehaven scandal ===
An air of controversy surrounds this masque, as the Earl of Castlehaven, Bridgewater's brother-in-law, was the subject of a sordid sodomy and rape scandal for which he was executed. Some critics have conjectured that the masque, with its focus on chastity, was designed to "cleanse" the Egerton family.

== Musical versions ==
The original vocal music for the masque (the dance music is not extant), in a baroque style, was composed by Henry Lawes, who also played the part of The Attendant Spirit.

When the poet John Dalton adapted Milton’s work to fit 18th-century theatrical conventions in 1738, he considerably extended its musical content by the addition of lyrics from elsewhere in Milton's work and by some of his own composition. The musical setting was by Thomas Arne and was a major success, many times revived. Among the original performers were several relations of Arne. Sabrina was played by Mrs Arne, the Lady by his daughter Susannah Maria Cibber, while his son-in-law, Theophilus Cibber, starred as one of her brothers.

In 1745 George Frideric Handel composed three songs and a trio as part of a private arrangement of the masque which was first performed, in June 1745, also at Ludlow Castle.

The later Scenes from Comus for vocal soloists and orchestra is one of the best-known works of composer Hugh Wood. Commissioned by the BBC and composed between 1962 and 1965, it was premiered in a broadcast from the BBC Proms in 1965.

== Theatrical adaptations ==
Besides John Dalton's 18th-century stage adaptation, there was another, titled Comus – A Masque in Honour of Chastity, adapted by Patrick Barlow and directed by Lucy Bailey, performed at the Sam Wanamaker Playhouse at Shakespeare's Globe in 2016.
