= London Early Opera =

- Orchestra & Research Group
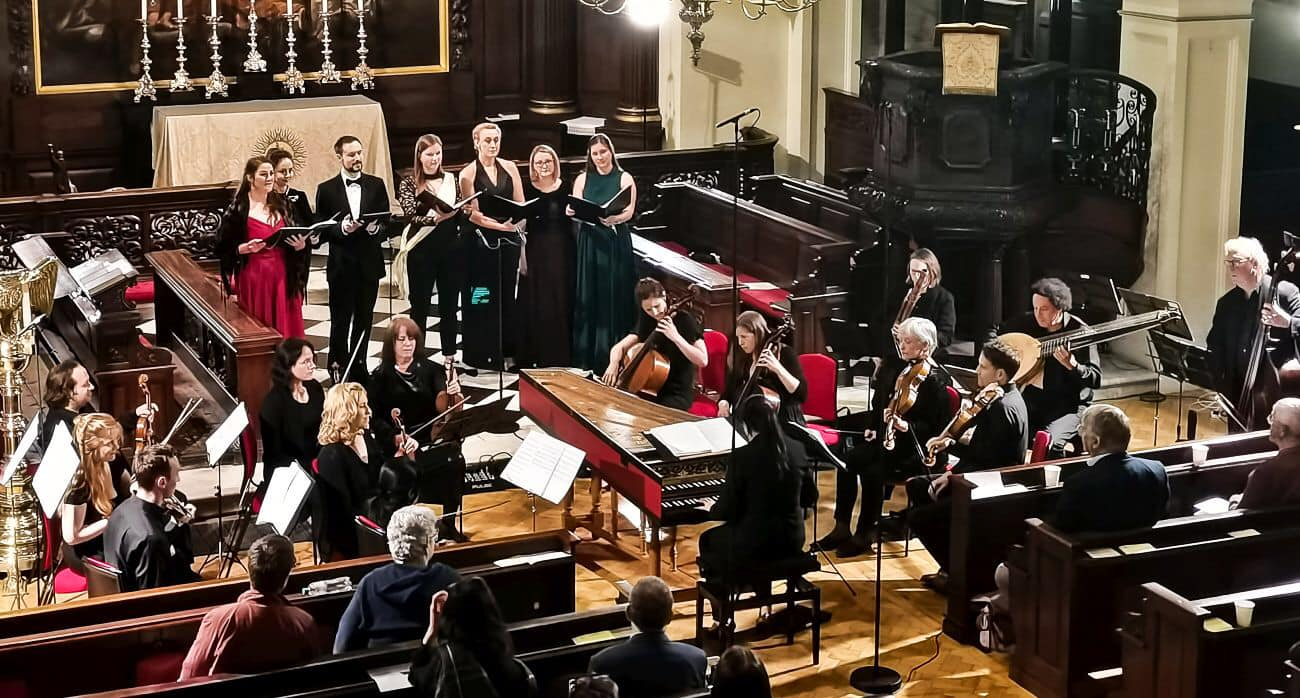
- LEO Premiere of Handel's Caio Fabbricio
- Founded: 2008
- Location: London & South East England
- Music director: Bridget Cunningham
- Website: www.londonearlyopera.org

London Early Opera (LEO) is a British period-instrument orchestra consisting of specialist baroque instrumentalists, singers, researchers, historians and musicologists. LEO was founded in 2008 by artistic director Bridget Cunningham as a research-led group. The orchestra is based in London and the south-east of England and became a UK Charity in 2011 (charity no 1143989).

== Research and education ==
London Early Opera undertakes musicological research into baroque music and historical performance practice, working with historians, scholars and editors including Bridget Cunningham David E. Coke, Lars Tharp and Michael Talbot. The orchestra performs and records well-known baroque music as well as newly discovered historical works to preserve musical heritage. The group also creates new scholarly editions of previously lost musical works, specialising in the music of George Frideric Handel, Johann Adolf Hasse and their contemporaries. In 2021 the group edited and recorded their reconstruction of Handel’s Caio Fabbricio HWV A^{9} and have also edited a selection of Handel’s music originally performed in Vauxhall, London, Germany, Italy.

LEO also operates an educational scheme and chamber ensemble, The Handelians, which focuses on the development and education of singers and musicians, and nurtures them in the baroque style.

== Performing ==
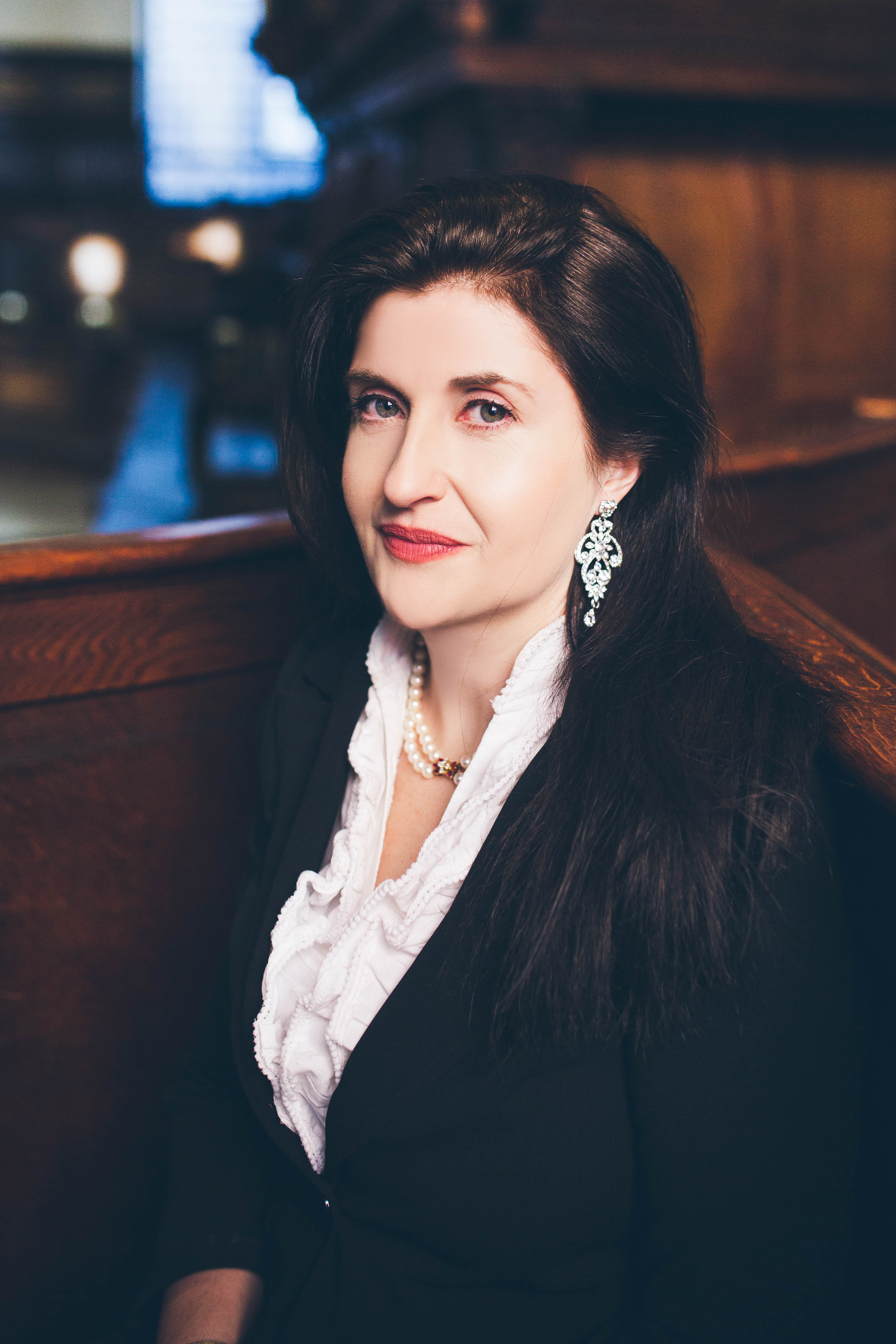
LEO artistic director Bridget Cunningham

LEO has performed at venues including Coram’s Fields; the Foundling Museum; St James’s Church, Piccadilly; St George’s Church, Hanover Square; the Handel Hendrix Museum; St. Peter’s Church, Vauxhall; Grosvenor Chapel; and a 400th Anniversary Concert of the Monteverdi Vespers at Southwark Cathedral. The orchestra has performed at the London Handel Festival and also tours outside of the UK.

In 2017 LEO performed Handel’s Water Music and a new world-premiere performance of River written by a previous winner of BBC Young Composer of the Year, Grace-Evangeline Mason. This was commissioned by the BBC and performed live by London Early Opera for BBC Radio 4 on the Eras`mus Boat on the River Thames celebrating the 300th Anniversary of Handel's Water Music. In 2022 LEO launched their recording of Handel’s Caio Fabbricio with a world premiere first performance in modern times at St George’s Church, Hanover Square, edited and directed by Bridget Cunningham. LEO have also given several performances on BBC Radio 3.

== Recordings ==
In 2015, LEO began a series of recording projects with Signum Records, capturing world premiere recordings exploring Handel’s life, influences and experiences. The series includes the albums Caio Fabbricio, Handel in Italy, Handel in Ireland, Handel at Vauxhall and Handel’s Eight Great Harpsichord Suites. Handel’s Queens was shortlisted for a 2020 Gramophone Award nomination.

Full discography
Title	Details
Caio Fabbricio HWV A9 by G.F. Handel	Released: 2022; Label: Signum Records
Handel’s Eight Great Harpsichord Suites	Released: 2021; Label: Signum Records
Handel’s Queens	Released: 2019; Label: Signum Records
Handel at Vauxhall: Volume 2	Released: 2017; Label: Signum Records
Handel in Ireland: Volume 1	Released: 2017; Label: Signum Records
Handel in Italy: Volume 2	Released: 2016; Label: Signum Records
Handel at Vauxhall: Volume 1	Released: 2016; Label: Signum Records
Handel in Italy: Volume 1	Released: 2015; Label: Signum Records
Thirty-odd feet below Belgium	Released: 2011; Label: Gloria Magnificat Recording Company
