= Comus (Arne) =

- Masque by Thomas Arne
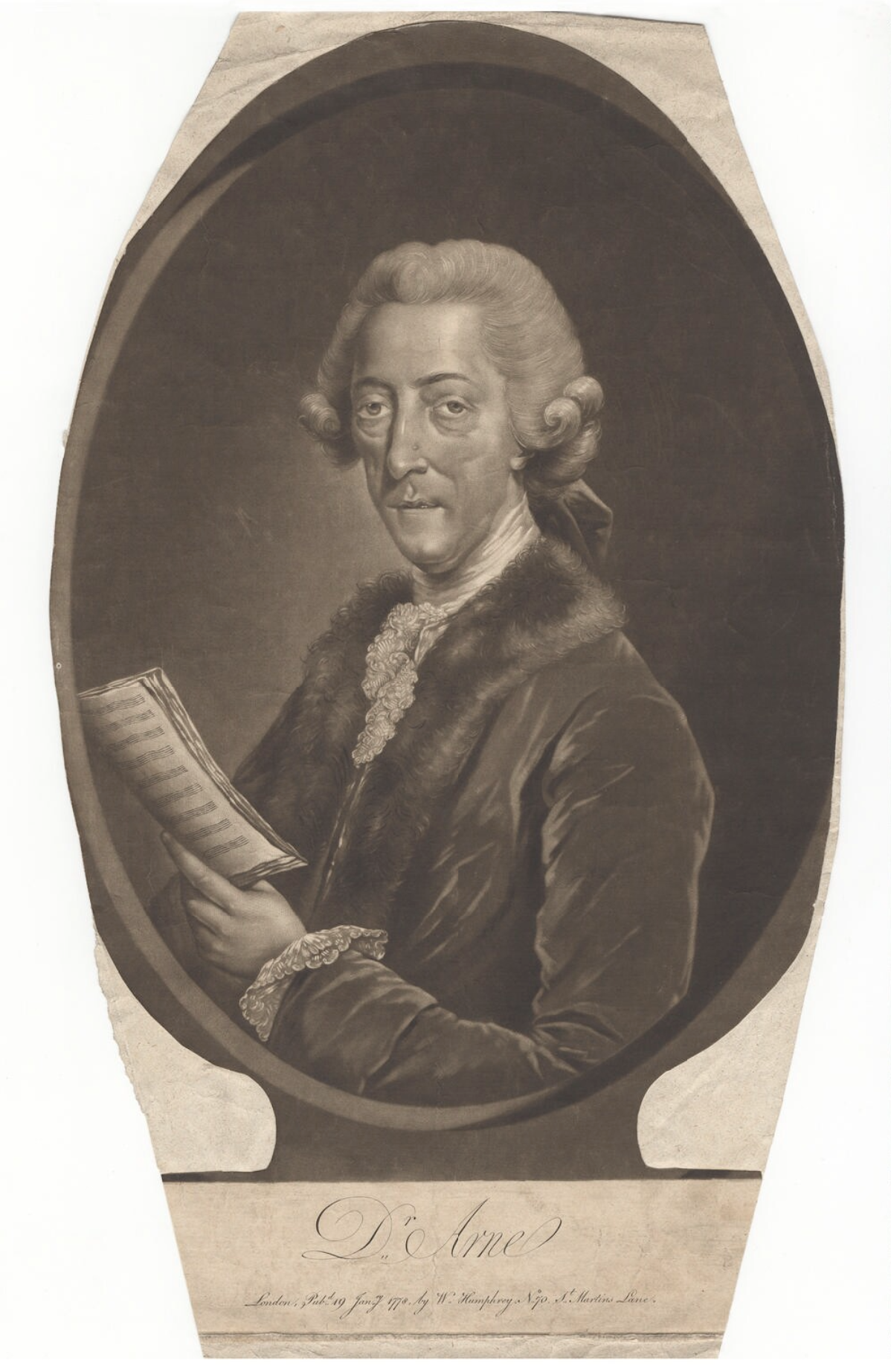
- 1778 portrait of Arne
- Librettist: John Dalton
- Based on: Milton's Comus
- Premiere: 4 March 1739; Theatre Royal, Drury Lane, London

Comus is a masque in three acts adapted from John Milton's masque of the same name by John Dalton in 1738. The music there was set by Thomas Arne and helped establish the composer's reputation.

== An 18th century relaunch ==
The poet John Dalton adapted Milton's masque of 1634 so as to fit 18th century theatrical conventions and published it in 1738 as Comus, a Mask (Now adapted to the Stage). In particular he considerably extended its musical content by the addition of lyrics from elsewhere in Milton's work, and also some of Dalton's own composition, as well as adding the character Euphrosyne. The work was first performed at London's Theatre Royal, Drury Lane on 4 March 1738 and after its successful run was performed elsewhere and revived several times.

The music for Comus was Thomas Arne's first major success. The original score is now lost, but a copy made around 1785 does exist. Several members of the company were then at the height of their careers and included relations of Arne. Mrs Arne played Sabrina; the Lady was played by his sister Susannah Maria Cibber, while his brother-in-law starred as one of her brothers.

== Roles ==
Role	Voice type	Premiere Cast, 4 March 1738 (Conductor: - Thomas Arne)
A Lady	non-singing role	Susannah Maria Cibber
Comus, a Magician	non-singing role	James Quin
Euphrosyne, a Grace	soprano	Catherine "Kitty" Clive
Sabrina, a Nymph	soprano	Cecilia Arne (born Cecilia Young)
First brother of the lady	non-singing role	William Milward
Second brother of the lady	non-singing role	Theophilus Cibber
Assorted spirits, revelers in Comus's pleasure crew, etc.	various voice types	John Beard, Cecilia Arne, Kitty Clive

== Synopsis ==
A lady is lost in the forest where the magician Comus dwells; masquerading as a shepherd he entices her to his palace. A spirit warns the lady's two brothers that their sister is in Comus's control but they are waylayed by Comus's stooges. The spirit supplies the brothers with an enchanted potion to help them thwart Comus's spell over the lady. A banquet is organized in Comus's palace and the lady, succumbing to the power of the spell, is diverted by the songs and dances of the festivities. Comus forcefully encourages her to drink from his cup but the brothers dash in just in time, putting Comus to flight. The nymph Sabrina frees the lady from the magician's spell and all rejoice at the triumph of virtue in the masque's final chorus.
