= John Dalton (poet) =

English cleric and poet

John Dalton (1709–1763) was an English cleric and poet. He is now remembered as a librettist.

== Life ==
The son of the Rev. John Dalton, rector of Dean, Cumberland, he was born there; Richard Dalton was his brother. He received his school education at Lowther, Westmorland, and when sixteen years old was sent to The Queen's College, Oxford, entering the college as batler 12 October 1725, being elected taberdar 2 November 1730, and taking the degree of B.A. on 20 November 1730. Shortly afterwards he was selected as tutor to Lord Beauchamp, the only son of the Earl of Hertford, later Duke of Somerset.

Ill-health prevented Dalton from accompanying Lord Beauchamp on travels through Europe, which ended in his death at Bologna in 1744. Dalton proceeded to his degree of M.A. on 9 May 1734, and on 21 April in the next year was allowed to accept a living from Queen's; his election to a fellowship there followed on 28 June 1741. For some time he was an assistant preacher under Thomas Secker, at St. James's, Westminster. Through the Duke of Somerset's influence he was appointed canon of the fifth stall in Worcester Cathedral in 1748, and about the same time obtained the rectory of St. Mary-at-Hill in the City of London.

Dalton took the degrees of B.D. and D.D. on 4 July 1750. He died at Worcester on 22 July 1763, and was buried at the west end of the south aisle of Worcester Cathedral, where a monumental inscription was placed to his memory. Horace Walpole asserted in correspondence that both Henrietta Knight, Lady Luxborough and her friend Frances Seymour, then countess of Hertford, had had affairs with Dalton. When Dalton was a tutor to the Hertfords, Lady Luxborough's husband Robert Knight, Baron Luxborough did find love letters from Henrietta to Dalton, accused her of becoming pregnant by him, and arranged a separation.

== Works ==
=== Comus libretto ===
Dalton's libretto for the Comus of Thomas Arne was published as Comus, a Mask, now adapted to the Stage, as alter'd, from Milton's Mask (1738). It was a significant version of the original masque, Comus by John Milton. The insertion of songs and passages taken from other poems of Milton, and the addition of several songs of his own, developed the Comus in a way still to the taste of Henry John Todd a century later. The Arne-Dalton Comus kept its place on the stage for many years, and in 1750 Dalton saw it was performed as a benefit for Elizabeth Foster, a granddaughter of Milton, supported by Samuel Johnson and David Garrick among others. It was supplanted on the stage around 1772, by George Colman's abridgment.

The published version was twice reprinted in London in 1738, and once pirated in Dublin. The sixth impression bore the date of 1741; it was often reissued until 1777, and was included in Bell's British Theatre, and other collections.

=== Other works ===
Dalton's first work was the anonymous An Epistle to a Young Nobleman from his Preceptor, 1736. It was republished in Two Epistles, the first to a Young Nobleman from his Preceptor, written in the year 1735–6; the second to the Countess of Hartford at Percy Lodge, 1744, London 1745. Both of them are included in George Pearch's Collection of Poems, i. 43–64. Dalton was also the author of A Descriptive Poem, addressed to two ladies at their return from viewing the mines near Whitehaven, to which are added some Thoughts on Building and Planting, to Sir James Lowther, 1755, with notes on the mines by his friend, William Brownrigg. Most of the Descriptive Poem was printed with the notes in William Hutchinson's History of Cumberland, and both of the poems were in George Pearch's Collection. Dalton's verses on "Keswick's hanging woods and mountains wild" were praised in Thomas Sanderson's Poems (Carlisle, 1800), pp. 84, 226–7.

Dalton's published sermons were:

- Two Sermons preached before the University of Oxford, at St. Mary's, on Sept. 15th and Oct. 20th 1745; and now Publish'd for the Use of the Younger Students in the two Universities.
- The Religious Use of the Visitation of Sickness: Recommended in a Sermon Preach'd at the Abbey-Church at Bath ... on Sunday, December 8, 1745.
- A Sermon preached before the University of Oxford, at St. Mary's, on the fifth of November, 1747.
- A Sermon preached at the Parish-Church of St. Anne Westminster, on Thursday April the 25th, 1751, before the Governors of the Middlesex-Hospital.

Remarks on XII. Historical Designs of Raphael and the Musæum Græcum et Ægyptiacum, or Antiquities of Greece and Egypt, illustrated by prints intended to be published from Mr. Dalton's drawings (1752) was preliminary promotional material for Richard Dalton, his brother.

== Family ==
Dalton's wife was a sister of Sir Francis Gosling, an alderman of London. She long survived him, and, on the death in 1791 of her brother-in-law Richard, she obtained access to her income.
