= List of Saudi Arabian artists =

The following list of notable Saudi Arabian artists (in alphabetical order by last name) includes artists of various genres, who are notable and are either born in Saudi Arabia, of Saudi Arabian descent or who produce works that are primarily about Saudi Arabia.

== A ==
- Sarah Abu Abdallah, artist in modern Saudi art, utilising digital and video technology in innovative ways
- Sarah Mohanna Al Abdali (born 1989), painter, street artist
- Shadi Al-Atallah (born 1994), painter, illustrator; living in London
- Shadia Alem (born 1960), installation artist, sculptor, and photographer
- Hend al-Mansour (born 1956) Saudi-born American visual artist, printmaker, and physician
- Hmoud Al-Attawi (born 1986), multidisciplinary artist working in sculpture, installation art, printmaking, and photography
- Dana Awartani Saudi visual artist, of Palestinian ethnicity; working as a painter, video artist, and sand mosaicist

== B ==
- Hanan Bahamdan (born 1966), painter
- Safeya Binzagr (born 1940), painter, founder of a museum

== D ==
- Manal Al Dowayan (born 1973), installation artist

== E ==
- Ahmed Emad Eldin (born 1996), Saudi-born Egyptian digital artist

== F ==
- Khalid Al-Faisal (born 1940), politician, painter, and poet
- Ashraf Fayadh (born 1980), Saudi-born visual artist and poet, of Palestinian origin
- Basmah Felemban (born 1993), graphic designer, graphic artist

== G ==
- Fatima Abou Gahas (1920–2010), painter, muralist
- Zahrah Al Ghamdi, painter, land artist, professor
- Abdulnasser Gharem (born 1973), conceptual artist, installation artist, painter, and military officer

== H ==
- Hana Hajjar, political cartoonist
- Ola Hejazi, Lebanese-born Saudi painter, printmaker, and educator
- Lulwah Al-Homoud (born 1967), curator, calligrapher

== M ==
- Ahmed Mater (born 1979), photographer, calligrapher, painter, installation artist, performance artist, and video artist
- Jameelah Mater (born 1986) artist, muralist, and workshop facilitator specializing in Al-Qatt Al-Asiri geometric patterns and sustainable materials.
- Lina Mo (born 1987), photographer, illustrator
- Munira Mosli (1954–2019), painter

== S ==
- Fahda bint Saud Al Saud (born 1953), watercolorist, part of the House of Saud
- Reem bint Mohammed Al Saud photographer and gallery owner, part of the House of Saud
- Shalimar Sharbatly (born 1971), abstract painter
- Noha Al-Sharif (born 1980), sculptor

== T ==
- Huda Totonji, calligrapher, graphic designer, educator

== See also ==
- Saudi Arabian art
- Saudi women in the arts
- Contemporary Saudi Arabian female artists
- Visual arts in Saudi Arabia
