= Contemporary Saudi Arabian female artists =

There has been an increase in public galleries exhibiting modern art in Saudi Arabia. This is supported by the influx of commercial galleries in the country and a growing grass-roots movement of artists which have acquired international status. Saudi Arabia is making its mark on the contemporary art scene and at the centre of this are women. These artists are noted for pushing at existing boundaries in the socially conservative country. Their work is largely feminist in nature—posing questions on the current political climate and women's rights. They question existing parameters and challenge proposed gender roles and social norms and use art to express injustices in order to give voice to an otherwise marginalized group.

== Origins ==
The scene began in Saudi Arabia's Asir Province where Prince Khalid Al Faisal, himself a poet and artist, inaugurated a cultural center that promoted young fresh talents. It was from this project that one of Saudi Arabia's most prominent contemporary artists, Ahmed Mater, emerged. The coastal town of Jeddah also saw the emergence of a grass-roots art scene, where artists incorporated media outlets such as photography and video technology, which enabled their work to make a transitional path through to the global art scene. Under King Abdullah, the Saudi Arabian government has encouraged women to have better work and educational opportunities. In September (2011) the government stated that in the future women would be able to vote in the Shura Council, the appointed consultative council that advises the king and advocate women's rights in the kingdom. This has set into motion a burgeoning movement of female artists expressing themselves in the artistic domain. Manal Al Dowayan, an artist central to the movement, claims that their art gives them a voice otherwise denied them to express themselves in a society where they have little opportunity to do so. Women are typically considered dependents and are often contingent on male guardians. They are subject to male guardianship laws which oblige them to seek permission from their husbands, fathers or even sons to work, travel, study and many other activities.

== Important shows ==
=== Nabatt ===
Nabatt: A Sense of Being (2010) is an exhibition of contemporary art from Saudi Arabia. It is presented by the Saudi Arabian Pavilion at the Shanghai World Expo. Amongst the artists exhibiting, it features works by Shadia & Raja Alem, Reem Al Faisal, Lulwah Al Homoud, Jowhara Al Saud, Noha Al-Sharif & Maha Mullah. The show attempts at engaging with the diverse nature of life, notably human relationships and the interactions amongst and within social groups and communities.

=== Edge of Arabia ===
Edge of Arabia (2003) is a UK independent non-profit organisation, founded by an artist collective.

==== We Need to Talk: Jeddah ====
In January 2012, a 40-piece exhibition was organized under the entitle ‘We Need to Talk’. More than a third of the works displayed were by women.

==== Come Together: London ====
In October 2012, 'Come Together' was presented and curated by Stephen Stapleton displaying large-scale, multi-media work by leading Arab artists. The name of the exhibition, Come Together was a reference to social networking channels and their influence on individual expression in the Arab World. The show featured the work of 30 emerging artists which included works by Saudi Arabia's Sarah Al Abdali and Manal Al Dowayan. In addition to the exhibition Edge of Arabia teamed up with The Crossway Foundation, Dar Al Mamûn and Future Shorts to incorporate an education programme comprising workshops, film screenings, topical discussions, and guided exhibition tours.

=== Soft Power ===
Soft Power (September 26 – December 10, 2012) was the inaugural show at Alaan Artspace art center in Saudi's capital. The multifunction venue was Riyadh’s first curated contemporary art platform. The name Alaan, meaning ‘now’ in Arabic, is supposed to represent the energy and power of the prevailing art scene in Saudi Arabia. The exhibition shows works entirely created by women, who are both diverse methodologically and in terms of their artistic style. Further, the founder, creative director and chief curator are all women.

The gallery also hosts master classes and workshops, organized by Sara Raza (the former curator of public programmes for London's Tate Modern museum), teaching prospective artists about contemporary art. Moreover, Alaan Artspace funds its non-commercial exhibitions, commissions new works and offers free non-profit educational arts programming through revenues from its shop, restaurant and café. Soft Power represents an innovative project, looking at the complex domain of a woman's role and the position of women within contemporary Saudi society. It features three Saudi female artists: Sarah Abu Abdallah, Sarah Mohanna Al-Abdali and Manal Al Dowayan. The exhibition, rather than being explicitly political, explores the subtleties of the political and social contentions prevalent in Saudi Arabia. Throughout the exhibition, there are references made to the guardianship laws adopted in Saudi Arabia. The female subjects represented are givers, consumers, objects, power-brokers and caretakers. As stated by the exhibitions website, the artists embrace ‘a nuanced and at times humorous approach towards exploring the position of women within contemporary society.’ The name of the exhibition encapsulates this stance, and the subjects of the works themselves, which attempt at reshaping the expected narrative. Moreover, it offers a platform for discussion and dialogue on matters concerning art in Saudi Arabia.

== Prominent artists ==
=== Manal Al Dowayan ===
Manal Al Dowayan (1973) was born in Dhahran, the Eastern province of Saudi Arabia. Initially she studied Systems Analysis (MSc) and worked as a Creative Director in an oil company. She was working and producing art for 7 years until she became a full-time artist in 2010. This was a result of an active art industry that was evolving in her region. Dowayan has rapidly become one of the leading advocates of contemporary artists in the Middle East. She studied abroad in a number of art institutions including USA, London, Dubai and Bahrain. She works mostly with photographs and installations and her work is largely feminist in nature. Her most revered piece is 'Suspended Together', a flock of doves made from fiber-glass with stickers on their bodies . The doves are interlocked and made up of permission slips that women in Saudi Arabia must have signed by their husbands or male guardians to have permission to travel.

An internationally acclaimed artist, she has exhibited her work at the Venice Biennial Collateral show "The Future of a Promise" in 2011 and at the Victoria and Albert Museum as part of exhibition that showcases their public acquisitions of Middle East Photography titled "Light From the Middle East" in 2013 and the American Biennial Prospect New Orleans in an exhibition titled "Notes For Now" in 2014 where she showed a collection of 20 photographs and 11 videos titled "If I Forget You Don't Forget Me" she also participated in Fluid Form: Contemporary Art from Arab Countries (2010) in Seoul at Freedom to Create (2011) in New York City and at Simply Words in Switzerland (2012)

=== Samiah Khashoggi ===
Samiah Khashoggi, born 1958 in Abha, is an interior designer, painter, founder and organizer of Saudiaat, an art exhibition. In 1982, she graduated from Kingston University in the UK with a bachelor's degree in interior design, and in 2005 completed her Masters of Fine Arts from De Montfort University. She is a lecturer of interior design, fashion illustration and foundation art and design courses at Dar Al Hekma University from 2000–present.in 2014, she curated Anonymous Was a Woman, representation of women by women artists in celebration of 50 years of Saudi Women achievements at Hafez Gallery]] For a few years starting in 1983, she worked as the first female designer at her brother's furniture and design company.

==== Saudiaat ====
Working on her MFA required her to interview and organize an exhibit for local female artists. Her exhibition for her MFA turned into a regular exhibition called Saudiaat, featuring contemporary female Saudi Arabian artists. As well as featuring artwork, Saudiaat also supports local female artists and educates the public about the techniques involved in their work. As of 2012, the group has had four exhibitions, with the 2012 exhibition, titled "Directions", having been held in Jeddah.

=== Other artists ===
- Sarah Mohanna Al Abdali (born 1989), street artist
- Hanan Bahamdan (born 1966), painter
- Safeya Binzagr (born 1940), painter based in Jeddah.
- Fatima Abou Gahas, home frescos
- Hana Hajjar, cartoonist
- Ola Hejazi, artist, educator, influenced by the Arabic alphabet
- Lulwah Al-Homoud (born 1967), patterns based on Arabic letters
- Hend Al-Mansour (born 1956), visual artist, physician
- Huda Totonji, American-based Saudi artist.

== Wadjda ==
Wadjda, is the first feature film to be made in Saudi Arabia, and it was directed by a woman. Haifaa Al Mansour, made her debut at the Venice film festival. Her feature film explores the restrictions placed on women in the conservative Islamic kingdom. It took her three years to have the permission and backing to make. It is a Saudi/German co-production, produced by the Berlin-based Razor Film Produktions with support from Rotana Studios. It is the first film entirely shot in Saudi Arabia, documenting the everyday trials and tribulations of a young Saudi Arabian girl, Wadja. It encapsulates her childhood journey opposing social norms and restrictions both at home and school. Al Mansour hoped the film would help to change attitudes towards women and film both within and outside Saudi Arabia. However, the film is yet to be seen in Saudi Arabia until its subsequent television release. Al Mansour claims to have faced a number of challenges casting and filming in a country steeped in conservative attitudes. She aimed to depict the segregation of women in Saudi Arabia. Namely, the fact that women have lower legal status than men, are subject to guardianship laws and are banned from driving.

== See also ==
- List of Saudi Arabian artists
- Women's rights in Saudi Arabia
- Saudi women in the arts
- Censorship in Saudi Arabia
- Saudi Arabian art
- Women in Arab societies
- Human rights in Saudi Arabia
- Gender segregation and Islam
- Art History
- Saudi Arabian government
- Middle East
