= Saudi Arabian art =

Saudi Arabian art is contextual to the country being the birthplace of Islam; it includes both the arts of Bedouin nomads and those of the sedentary peoples of regions such as the Hejaz, Tihamah, Asir and Najd.

== Architecture ==
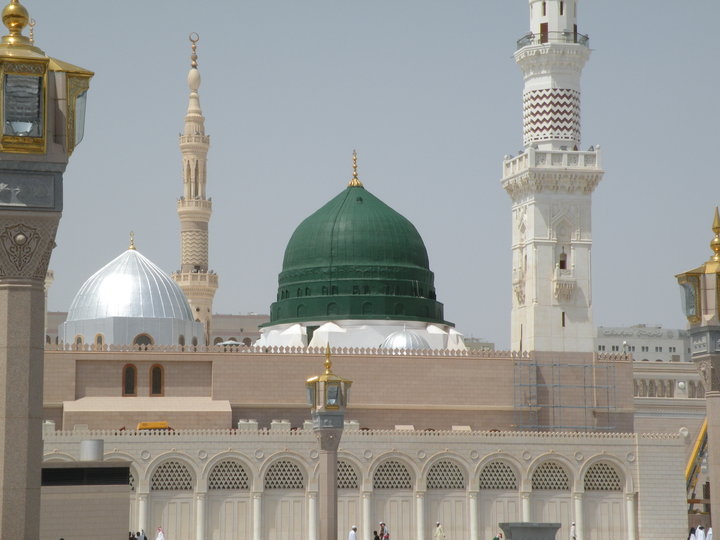
The Prophet's Mosque in Medina with the Green Dome at center; where the Islamic prophet Muhammad was buried

The first mosque of Islam was the house of the Islamic prophet Mohammad in Medina. When it was first built by Muhammad and his companions, it was made of simple blocks. As time passed and different Muslim empires and rulers were honored to rule Medina, the mosque has been subjected to different constructions. The last construction was done by the different Saudi kings. The current construction is the prototype of all later sacred Islamic architecture. The current design of the mosque pays great attention to all details; an important detail is the floor and carpet that are touched in prayer with the head. There are different regional styles of architecture in Saudi Arabia, and they are divided into different styles. In the Najd region, most buildings are made of mud-brick covered by mud-plaster. In the Hijaz region, most buildings are made of coral rag and wood, with roofs made of palm thatch and wooden beams. There are many Ottoman influences on the architecture in this region.

In the Al-Hufud regions, the houses are usually two or three stories and they surround a central courtyard.

In the Asir region, many houses are made of rough-cut stone, and other houses are made of a stone and mud combination.

== Visual arts ==
Tribal symbols referred to as "wusum" were carved by Bedouins during prehistoric times and are found as rock art in the hills and deserts of Arabia. During the years 1985–1990 there was a rock art and epigraphic survey of Saudi Arabia. During this time, over 1000 rock art sites were recorded. In the earlier stages of rock art, there were large human and animal faces, and in the later stages the human and animals faces were smaller.

== Decoration art ==
The art of decoration is a fundamental element of identity in the region of Asir. Al-Qatt Al-Asiri, an inscribed artwork on UNESCO's Intangible Cultural Heritage of Humanity, is an ancient art form popular in Asir region where the white interior walls of homes are painted with various patterns of symbols and geometric shapes. The tradition of house-painting is unique to women in the region, as the home is considered the female domain.

== Art movement ==
The art movement in Saudi Arabia started in the mid 60's by a group of school art teachers and lasted until the mid 80's.

In 1972, Mohammed Said Farsi became the mayor of the coastal city of Jeddah, making the city one of the largest open-air art galleries in the world.

== Portable art forms ==
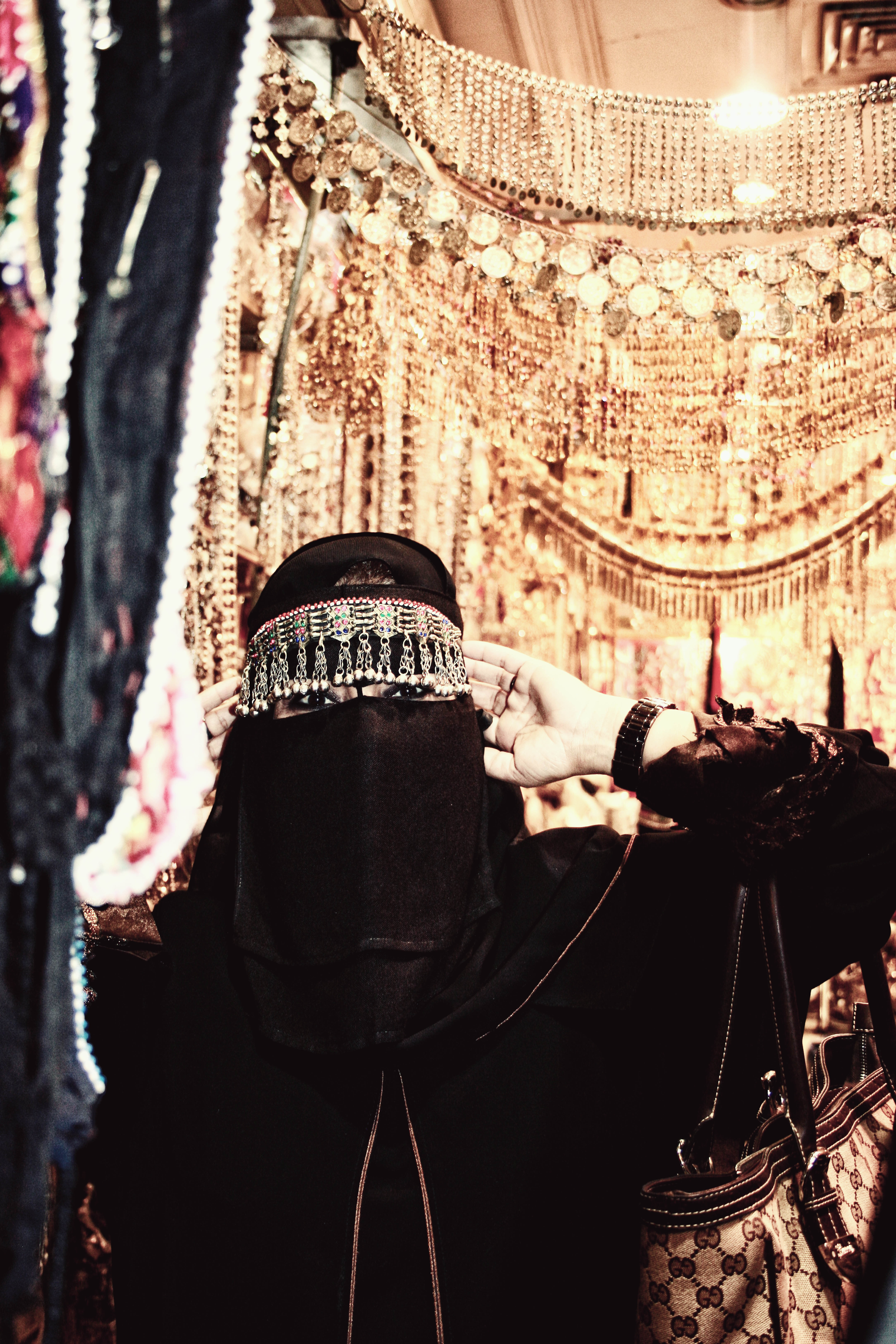
Gold and silver jewelry in downtown Jeddah

There are many portable art forms in Saudi Arabia. For example, there is metalware, jewelry, pottery and leatherwork. Even today, many Bedouin women weave, and they make brightly colored striped rugs, camel trapping and tents. The tents are black and are made of goat-hair, mixed with sheep's wool and camel-hair.

== Art exhibitions ==
A number of art exhibitions are organized in Saudi Arabia. In September 2018, the Saudi Art Association organized the Nation of Honor and Dignity exhibition at the Ritz-Carlton in Riyadh, displaying more than 140 works by 125 artists.

=== International Art Exhibition ===
In April 2019, an international art exhibition was organized in Jeddah at the Abdullah Al-Qasabi Gallery of the Saudi Fine Art Center. The exhibition displayed art work from Saudi Arabia as well as seven other countries.

=== Landscapes of the Soul ===
An exhibition was held at the King Abdulaziz Center for World Culture (Ithra) to display 40 pieces by Norwegian artist Edvard Munch. Munch's displayed pieces reflect on his personal life experiences of misery, love, despair, loneliness and reflections of the soul. The exhibition displayed lithograph versions of Munch's famous paintings including, The Scream, Summer Night. The Voice, Self-Portrait and The Sick Child.

=== Bait Al-Hodaif ===
Bait Al-Hodaif is a small art museum and a non-profit art organization based in Jeddah. It is made up of 14 rooms that display art pieces from the 1910s to the 1980s. It aims to promote the culture of art in Saudi Arabia by holding many events and exhibitions.

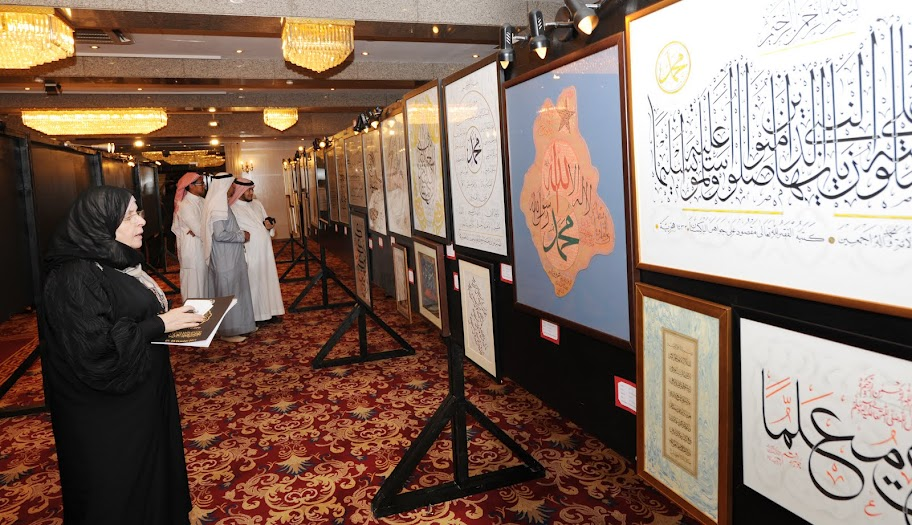
An art exhibition of Saudi calligraphy at a hotel in Jeddah

=== Shara Art Fair ===
Shara Art Fair is an art exhibition organized by the Saudi Art Council. It specializes in showcasing a collection of artistic paintings and pieces from different areas and fields. The fair aims at marketing new artists and selling their products as well as supporting emerging artists.

=== Canvash Studio ===
Canvash is an art studio and exhibition established by the Saudi artist Maysa bint Ahmed Al-Ruwaished. The studio, located in the Eastern province of Saudi Arabia, aims to reflect the culture of the Saudi society. Moreover, the studio holds a number of workshops to educate Saudi young artists and spread the culture of art appreciation.

=== The Misk Art Institute ===
Launched in 2017, the Misk Art Institute (MAI) is the artistic division of the MiSK Foundation. MAI led the Saudi pavilion at the 2019 Venice Biennale, organizing an exhibition by the Jeddah-based Saudi artist Zahrah Al Ghamdi. From 3 December 2020 to 28 February 2021, MAI organized Mukooth, an exhibition featuring emerging Saudi artists including Muhannad Shono, Alaa AlGhufaili, Saad AlHowede, Ayman Zedani and Hmoud Al-Attawi.

== Arts academies ==
Three academies dedicated to arts, heritage, and music, will be established in the country to receive students and trainees applications. The academies come as part of the Quality of Life Program initiatives and will be offering qualifications in arts.

== Cinema ==
The introduction of theatres into Saudi Arabia's cultural scene was orchestrated by the employees of the Arabian-American Oil Company, now better known as Aramco, at their residential complexes located in the city of Dhahran. The wider trend of cinema-going in the Kingdom emerged during the 1930s and its popularity continued well into the early 1980s. During the 1950s, outdoor cinemas popped up across several Saudi cities, involving screenings in open spaces around homes, of which were named after their respective owners. Until the late 1970s, movie theatres were only shown to male audiences in various sports clubs; however, in 2017, cinemas were officially permitted to operate in the Kingdom.

== Music ==
Historically, Arabs have transferred their musical heritage from generation to generation through verbal means. These traditions were often similar across genres due to the cultural crossover of the western and eastern parts of the Arabian Peninsula with those of the neighboring countries. Every region and occasion had its unique form of music, influenced in particular by occupations and environments, such as Al Haijana (singing atop the camel), Heda’a Al Sawani (drawing water from wells via camels, bulls and donkeys), Heda’a Al Ebel, Al Dana (famous throughout the Gulf and West Saudi Coast for its connection to the seas) alongside songs associated with building, farming, and grinding.

Saudi music began evolving in the early 1950s with lyrics influenced by the Pan-Arab musical movement; this led to musical works being split between the singer and composer.

== Fine art ==
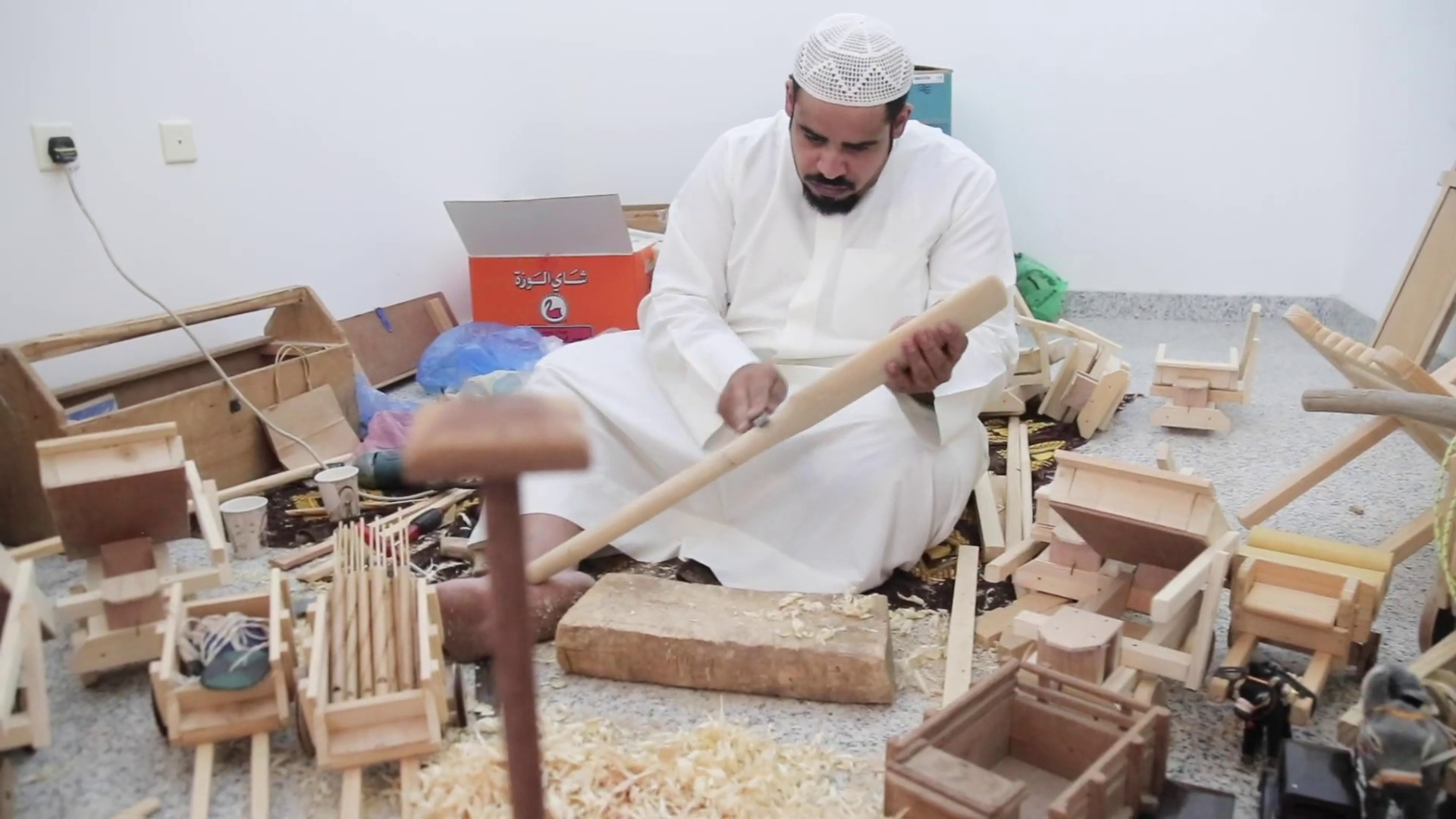
A Saudi craftsman at his market in Hofuf, Al-Ahsa

Handicrafts marked the beginning of Saudi fine arts in its modern sense, joining an ensemble of other arts and crafts that include Arabic calligraphy. Arts and crafts in their various forms were instrumental in creating objects of daily use, from ornaments and tools to decorations and clothes, while serving as a means of artisanship in pre-modern Saudi Arabia.

Unlike modern art, handicrafts weren't limited to their aesthetic features, but were deeply linked to livelihoods, as they were featured in local markets on a seasonal basis. Arabic calligraphy also took pride of place in cultural society due to its religious significance.

Researchers and historians agree that Saudi fine arts had successfully engrained itself into modern Saudi culture after the adoption of arts education as a core subject at boys’ schools in 1957 and girls’ schools in 1959. Arts education and lessons had primarily leveraged the use of pencils, pastel colors, wax and coal.

The defining moment for the fine arts scene in Saudi Arabia was the founding of the Institute of Art Education in Riyadh in 1965, which focused on teacher training and the development of consistent resources and a standardized curriculum. Due to the absence of specialized academies in fine arts, the academic institute served its mandate by producing art teachers.

== See also ==
- List of Saudi Arabian artists
- Contemporary Saudi Arabian female artists
- Saudi women in the arts
- Visual arts in Saudi Arabia

== Bibliography ==
- Majeed Khan: Wusum, the tribal symbols of Saudi Arabia, Kingdom of Saudi Arabia, Ministry of Education, 2000.
- Anthony Ham a.o.: Saudi Arabia, Lonely Planet, 2004.
- Dr. Muhammed Kamal Ismail a.o.: The archiceture of the Holy Mosque, Makkah, London, 1998.
- Robert Hillenbrand: Islamic Art and Architecture, Thames & Hudson, London, 2004 (1999).
- Marcel Kurpershoek: De laatste bedoeïen, Amsterdam, 1995.
