= Museum Five Continents =

Coordinates: 48°8′15.35″N 11°35′8.51″E

- Museum Fünf Kontinente
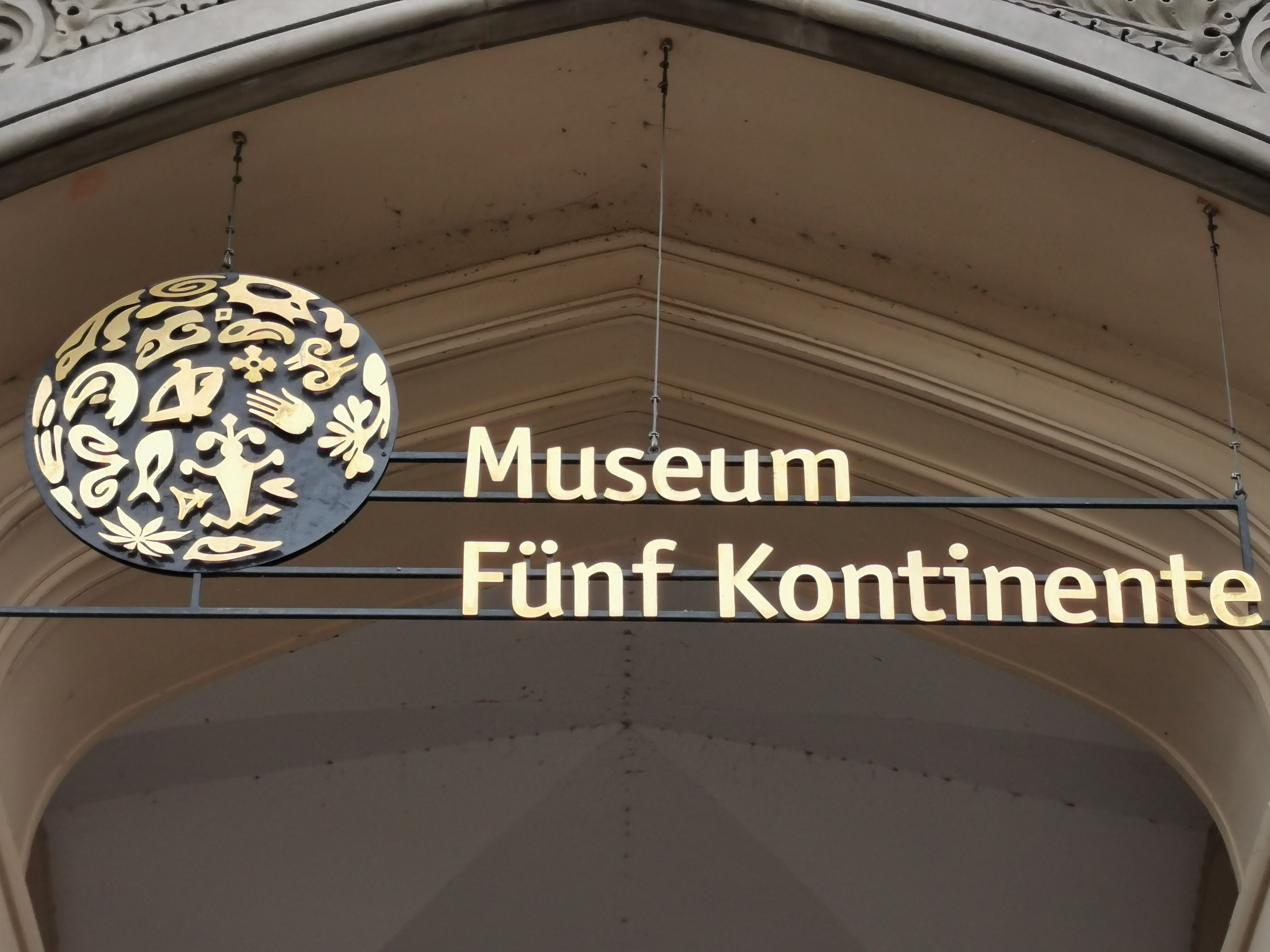

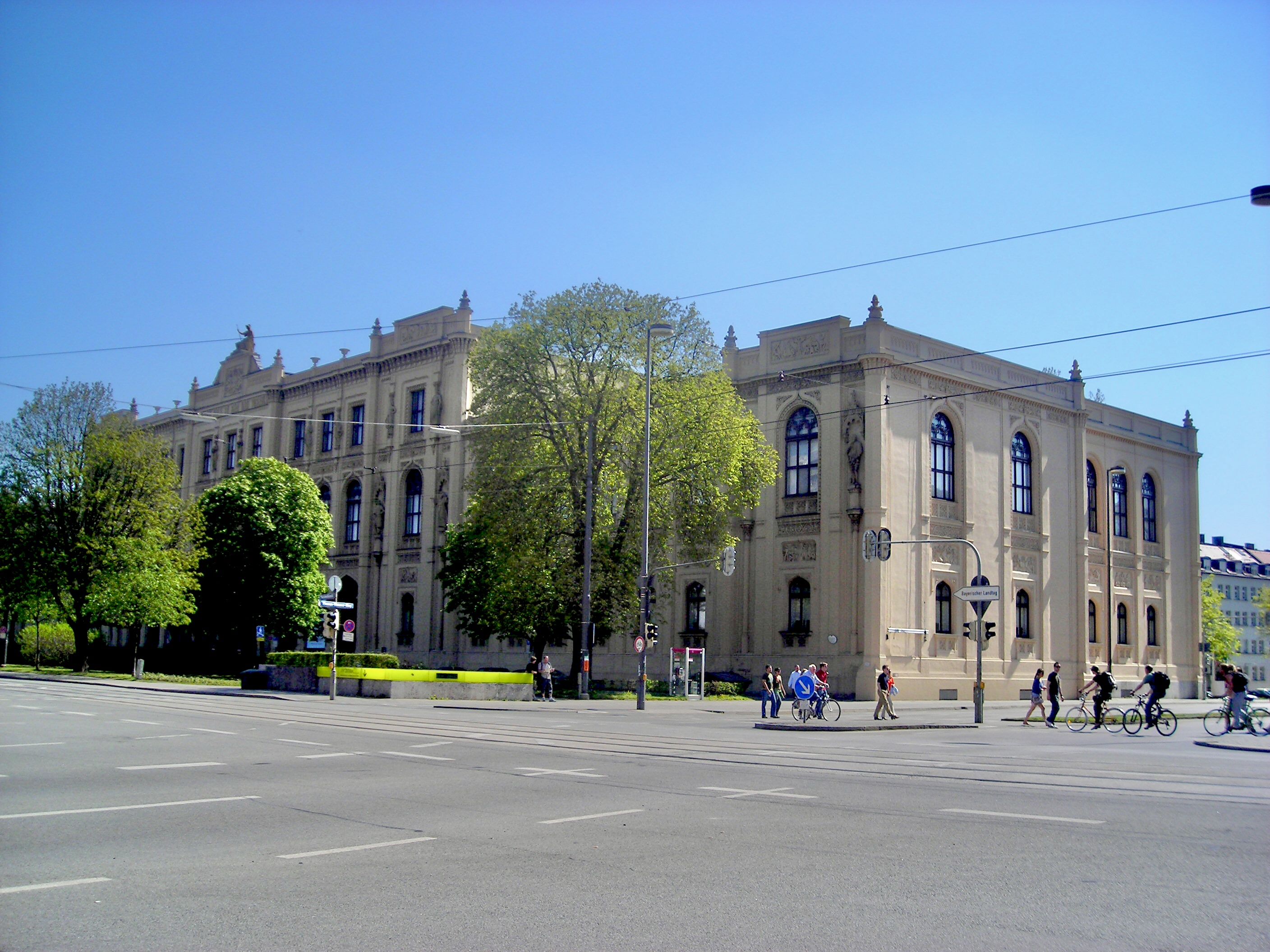
- Established: 1868
- Location: Munich, Germany
- Type: Ethnographic museum
- Executive director: Uta Werlich
- Owner: Bayerisches Staatsministerium für Wissenschaft und Kunst
- Parking: (none)
- Website: museum-fuenf-kontinente.de

The Museum Five Continents or Five Continents Museum (German: Museum Fünf Kontinente), located in Munich, Germany, is a museum for non-European artworks and objects of cultural value. Its name until 9 September 2014 was Bavarian State Museum of Ethnology (German: Staatliches Museum für Völkerkunde).

== The building ==
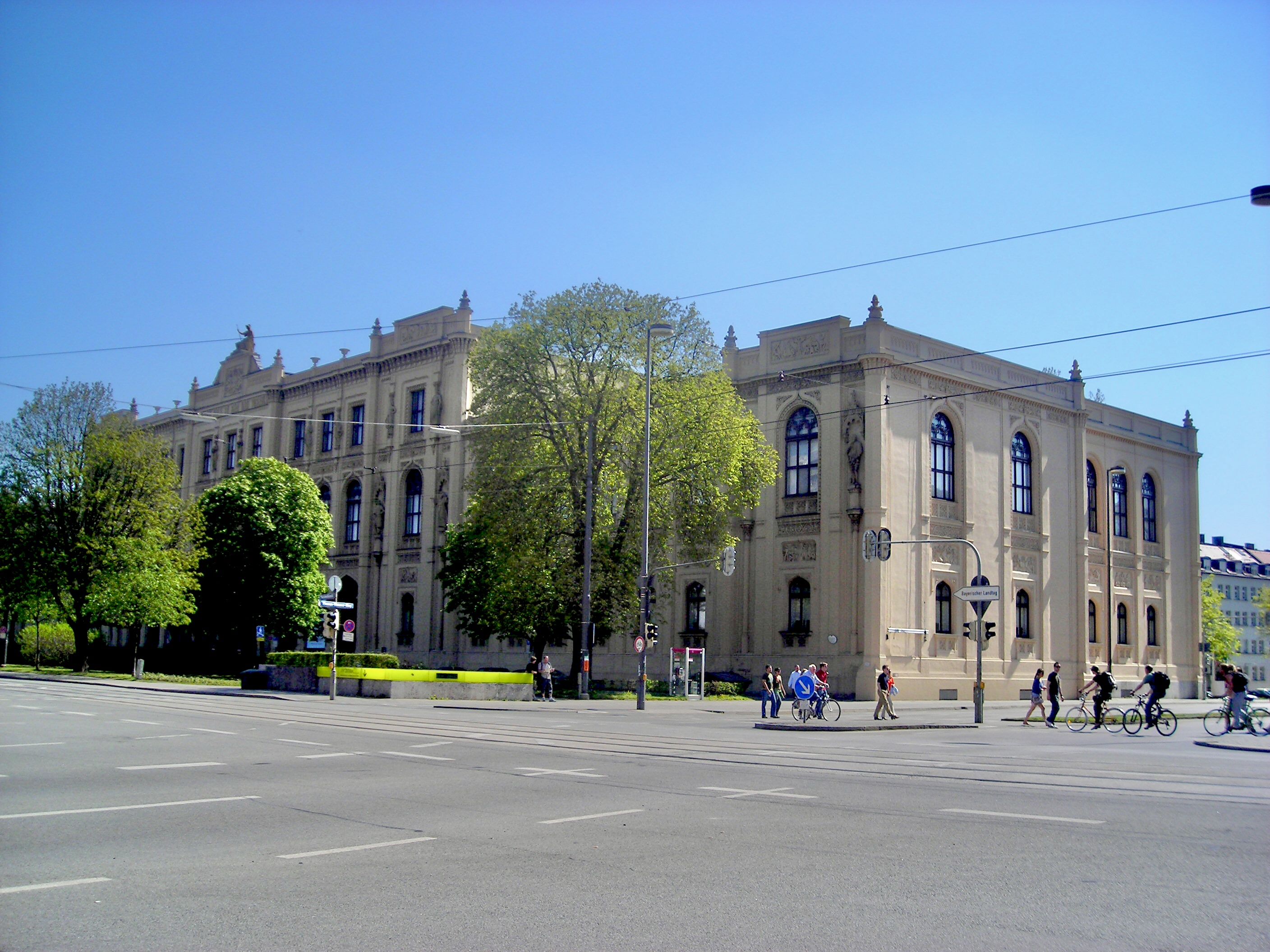
Museum Five Continents, Munich

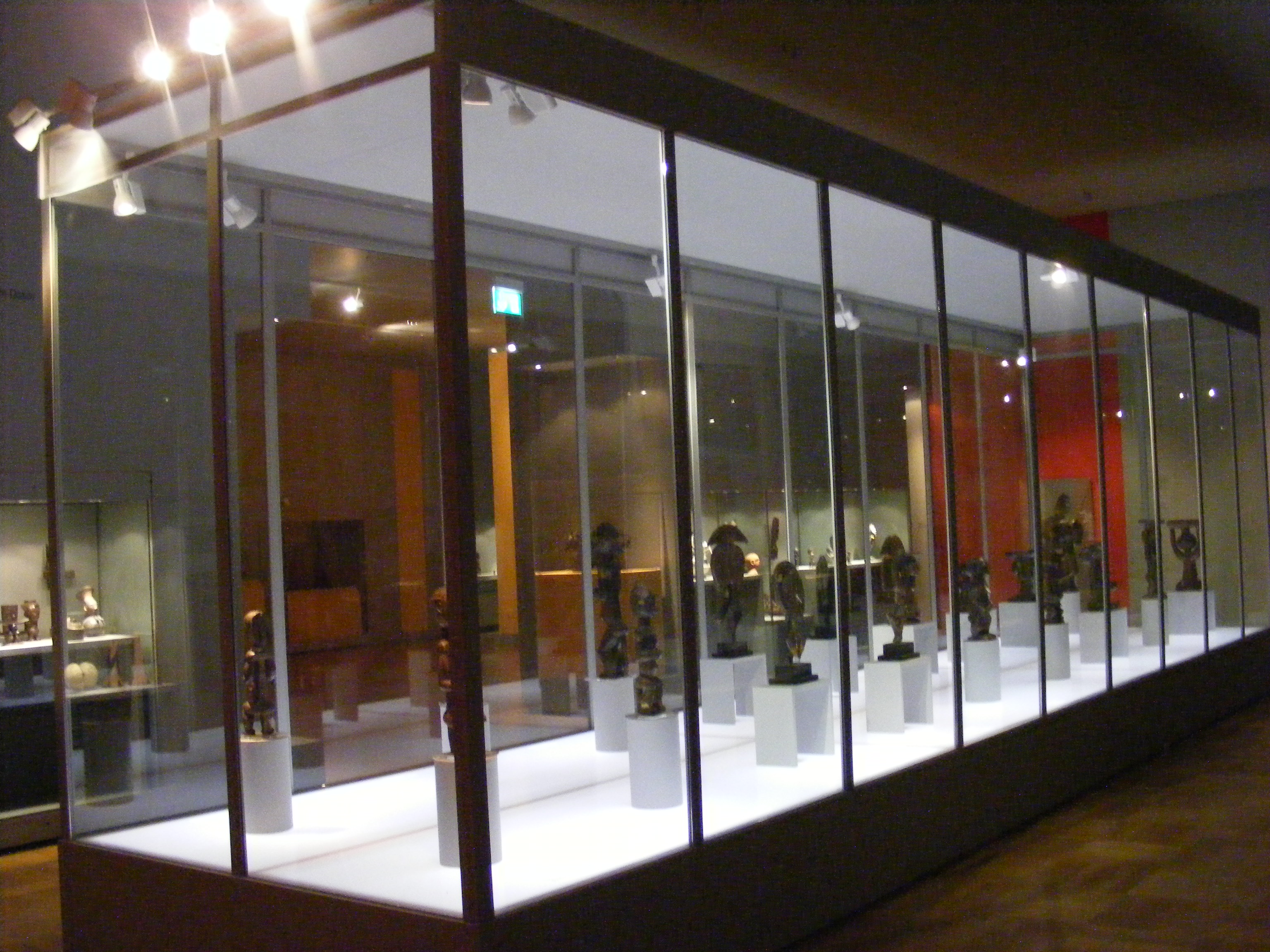
Display of African Art

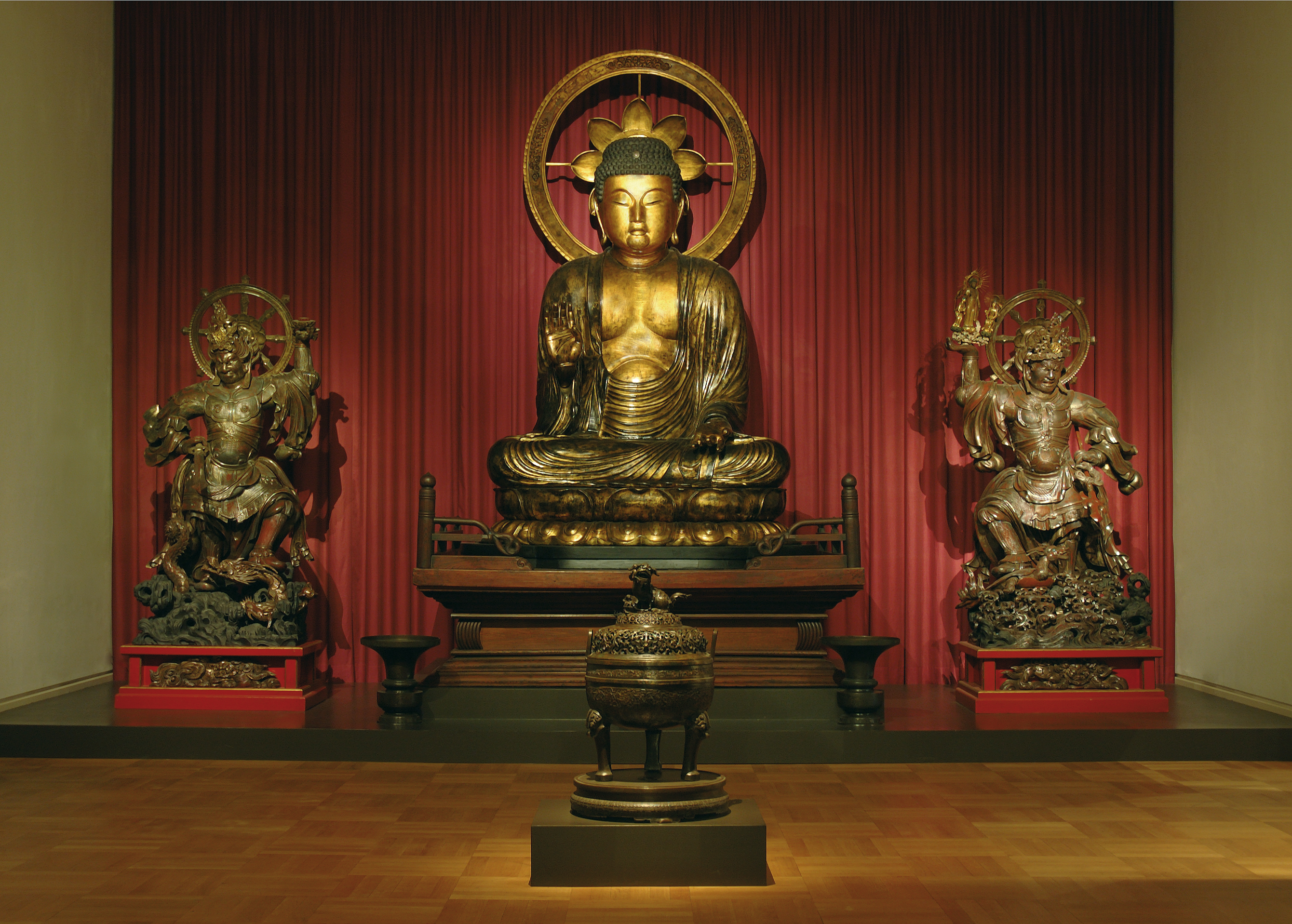
Hall of Buddha

The building in Munich's Maximilianstrasse, one of the city's four royal avenues, was originally constructed in 1859–1865 for the Bavarian National Museum by Eduard Riedel adverse to the building of the Government of Upper Bavaria. The architecture is influenced by the Perpendicular Style.

== The collections ==
The collection was founded in 1868, but its history started much earlier. The first collectors of objects from outside Europe were the members of the Wittelsbach dynasty. Today the museum is the second largest in Germany, outnumbered only by Berlin, with a collection of 200,000 objects and an exhibition area of 4,500 square metres (48,000 sq ft).

The total area is about 12,000 m^{2} (130,000 sq ft) and includes also facilities for carpentry, metalworking, painting and restoration, magazines, a meeting and conference room and offices.

On the second floor the permanent exhibitions for art and culture of the Americas and of Africa are shown while the exhibitions about the Islamic World, India, East Asia and Oceania are located in the first floor.

=== North America ===
Historical objects, including the world's oldest surviving kayak (1577), masks of the Northwest Coast Nations, wooden bird masks, decorated moccasins and other textiles

=== South America ===
Ceramics and objects of gold, silver and wood, as well as the art of Indigenous groups of Mexico, gods and war figures, masks, jewelry, vessels and textiles from Peru and Bolivia, everyday objects of the Native communities of the Amazon, head trophies from Brazil

=== Africa ===
Plastic arts with masks and figures from all parts of Africa, for example, religious figure "Nduda" from Yombe / Zaire (19th century), sculptures and weapons from West Africa, silver handicrafts from Ethiopia, body jewelry from South Africa, ivories and bronzes from Guinea

=== Islamic arts and cultures ===
The collection of Islamic arts and cultures encompasses around 20,000 objects of material culture not only from Islamic societies, but also from Christian and Jewish societies, from Southeast Europe, North Africa, West Asia as well as Central and Southwest Asia. In addition, it contains pre-Islamic archaeological objects from ancient southern Arabia and from Luristan in western Iran as well as ethnographica from the late 19th and early 20th centuries, e.g. from the Hindu Kush (Nuristan Collection).

The Islamic-influenced ethnographic collections mainly include jewellery from Yemen and Afghanistan as well as everyday objects and devotional objects from the Caucasus, North Africa, Iran, Pakistan and Central Asia. They also include a collection of 180 Turkish shadow puppets (Karagöz and Hacivat) and over 200 Pakistani Sufi posters.

The more than 1300 carpets and carpet fragments form a focus of the collection that is unique in Europe.

Masterpieces of Islamic art from Turkey, the Middle East, Iran, Iraq and Moghul India demonstrate the wealth of artistic creativity. In addition to medieval Islamic pottery, architectural elements and Persian and Moghul book illustrations, examples include a silver-inlaid brass plate made in the 13th century for Badr al-Din Lu'lu', the ruler of Mossul, Iraq, and a bronze casting vessel in the shape of a deer from the Egyptian Fatimid period (10th/11th century).

The contemporary art section of the collection includes works by artists such as Lalla Essaydi, Hojat Amani, Aneh Mohammad Tatari, Maryam Salour, Kamran Sharif, Homayoun Salimi as well as Lulwah Al Homoud, Maryam Rastghalam, Elisabeth Rössler or Hassan Massoudy.

=== South Asia ===
Colourful Indian deities, e.g. Nandi statue from India, Kapardin fragment of the Buddha (2nd century AD), Buddha heads of sandstone, statues of Shiva and Krishna

=== East Asia ===
Chinese wood sculptures, sitting on the world throne Buddha Amitabha, ivory model of a pagoda from the Chinese emperor, Ornate carvings from China, Japan and Indonesia

=== Oceania ===
Polynesian bar deity (Cook Islands), Melanesian paddle showing a fishing scene, Malangan figure from Melanesia, arms and shields from Australia

== Return of remains to Australia ==
In April 2019, work began to return more than 50 ancestral remains from five different German institutes, starting with a ceremony at the Five Continents Museum. The remains of a Gimuy Walubara Yidindji king were handed to representatives from the Yidindji nation, who are located around modern-day Cairns in northern Queensland. The remains had been in German possession since 1889.
