= List of Delta Sigma Theta collegiate chapters =

Delta Sigma Theta is an international historically Black sorority. It was founded at Howard University in 1913. The sorority has more than 1,000 collegiate and alumnae chapters located in the United States, Canada, England, Japan (Tokyo and Okinawa), Germany, the Virgin Islands, Liberia, Bermuda, Jamaica, The Bahamas, South Africa, South Korea and Nigeria.

In the early days of the sorority, many chapters were chartered as citywide chapters and included both graduate and undergraduate members. Others, such as Alpha Sigma, Beta Beta, Delta Sigma, Gamma Sigma, Epsilon Sigma, Omicron Sigma, Sigma Sigma, and Theta Sigma (Original) were chartered as alumnae-only chapters. Over time, alumnae chapters split from the mixed chapters. At that time, many city-wide chapters went dormant, with new collegiate chapters forming on specific campuses. In the 1970s, the sorority eliminated mixed chapters.

Following is a list of Delta Sigma Theta collegiate chapters, with active chapters indicated in bold and inactive chapters and institutions in italics.

Chapter	Charter date and range	Institution	Location	Status	Ref.
**Alpha**	January 13, 1913	Howard University	Washington, D.C.	Active	
**Beta**	February 17, 1914	Wilberforce University	Wilberforce, Ohio	Active	
**Gamma**	March 19, 1918	University of Pennsylvania	Philadelphia, Pennsylvania	Active	(Note: The chapter merged with the citywide Epsilon Phi chapter in the 1960s because of a lack of members.)
**Delta**	April 4, 1919 – 1939; 1974	University of Iowa	Iowa City, Iowa	Active	
**Epsilon**	November 19, 1919 – January 2013; 2016 ?	Ohio State University	Columbus, Ohio	Active	(Note: In 2013, OSU suspended the chapter for three years for hazing violations.)
**Zeta**	October 20, 1920 – 1945; 19xx ?	University of Cincinnati	Cincinnati, Ohio	Active	
Eta (Original) (see **Kappa Lambda**)	1920–19xx ?	Syracuse University	Syracuse, New York	Reissued	(Note: This chapter went dormant but later reformed as Kappa Lambda chapter.)
Theta (Original) (see **Mu Gamma**)	1920–19xx ?	Cornell University	Ithaca, New York	Reissued	(Note: Chapter went dormant due to low university enrollment of African American women but was reformed as part of the Mu Gamma citywide chapter in 1975.)
**Kappa**	February 21, 1921	University of California, Berkeley	Berkeley, California	Active	
**Lambda**	March 1, 1921	Chicago City-Wide	Chicago, Illinois	Active	(Note: Chapter was formed at the University of Chicago as a citywide chapter that served both graduate and undergraduates. In 1934, it became a collegiate chapter. It now includes Chicago State University, Illinois Institute of Technology, Loyola University, Roosevelt University, Northeastern Illinois University, the University of Chicago, and the University of Illinois-Chicago.)
Nu	April 7, 1921 – October 2, 2020	University of Michigan	Ann Arbor, Michigan	Active	(Note: Chapter originally functioned as a mixed chapter with both undergraduate and graduate members. In 1962, the graduates formed the Ann Arbor Alumnae chapter.) (Note: In October 2020, the national sorority suspended this chapter for five years.)
**Mu**	November 21, 1921	University of Pittsburgh	Pittsburgh, Pennsylvania	Active	
**Iota**	December 29, 1921	Berklee College of Music	Boston, Massachusetts	Active	(Note: Iota was chartered as a collegiate and alumnae chapter. In 1945, the alumnae members formed the Alpha Omicron Sigma chapter, now the Boston Alumnae chapter.)
**Iota**	December 29, 1921	Boston University	Boston, Massachusetts	Active	(Note: Iota was chartered as a collegiate and alumnae chapter. In 1945, the alumnae members formed the Alpha Omicron Sigma chapter, now the Boston Alumnae chapter.)
**Iota**	December 29, 1921	Emerson College	Boston, Massachusetts	Active	(Note: Iota was chartered as a collegiate and alumnae chapter. In 1945, the alumnae members formed the Alpha Omicron Sigma chapter, now the Boston Alumnae chapter.)
**Iota**	December 29, 1921	Northeastern University	Boston, Massachusetts	Active	(Note: Iota was chartered as a collegiate and alumnae chapter. In 1945, the alumnae members formed the Alpha Omicron Sigma chapter, now the Boston Alumnae chapter.)
**Xi**	April 15, 1922	University of Louisville	Louisville, Kentucky	Active	(Note: Chapter formed at Simmons College of Kentucky, became part of Louisville Municipal College and then part of University of Louisville when Louisville Municipal College merged into it in 1951.)
**Omicron**	April 1922 – 1939, 19xx ?	University of Nebraska–Lincoln	Lincoln, Nebraska	Active	
**Pi**	January 23, 1923	University of California, Los Angeles	Los Angeles, California	Active	
**Rho**	December 7, 1923 – 1961; 1986	Columbia University	New York, New York	Active	
Sigma (Original)	1924–1929	Atlanta University	Atlanta, Georgia	Reissued	(Note: The name Sigma was transferred to the undergraduate chapter at Clark College when Atlanta University became a graduate institution.)
Sigma (Original)	1924–1929	Spelman College	Atlanta, Georgia	Reissued	(Note: The name Sigma was transferred to the undergraduate chapter at Clark College when Atlanta University became a graduate institution.)
**Phi**	December 29, 1923	Drake University	Des Moines, Iowa	Active	(Note: This was chartered as a mixed chapter of both graduate and undergraduate members. The graduate members formed the Des Moines Alumnae chapter on July 1, 1981, leaving Phi as a collegiate chapter.)
**Phi**	December 29, 1923	Iowa State University	Ames, Iowa	Active	(Note: This was chartered as a mixed chapter of both graduate and undergraduate members. The graduate members formed the Des Moines Alumnae chapter on July 1, 1981, leaving Phi as a collegiate chapter.)
Tau (Original)	Jan 24, 1924–May 13, 1939	Detroit City-Wide	Detroit, Michigan	Reissued	(Note: Tau chapter originally included collegiate members from the University of Detroit and Wayne State University, as well as alumnae members. In 1939, the alumnae split off to form the Alpha Pi Sigma chapter, and Tau was rechartered as an undergraduate chapter.)
**Upsilon**	March 10, 1924 – 1941; 1945	University of Southern California	Los Angeles, California	Active	
**Chi**	March 14, 1925 – September 29, 1977; 1985–19xx ?; 1992	Indianapolis City-Wide	Indianapolis, Indiana	Active	(Note: Formed as a citywide chapter that included both undergraduates and alumni. The chapter went defunct when the alumnae members formed the Indianapolis Alumnae chapter in September 1977. It was re-established as a collegiate chapter in 1985 that includes Butler University, Indiana University-Purdue University at Indianapolis, and Depauw University.)
**Psi**	1925–19xx ?, 2000	University of Kansas	Lawrence, Kansas	Active	
Omega	1925–19xx ?	Cleveland City-Wide	Cleveland, Ohio	Inactive	
Alpha Alpha	1925–1969	Kansas City Area-Wide	Kansas City, Missouri	Inactive	(Note: This was formed as both an alumnae and undergraduate chapter. It was dissolved by a change in national policy that stopped mixed chapters. Its alumnae members formed the Kansas City Alumnae chapter in June 1969.)
**Alpha Beta**	March 13, 1926	Fisk University	Nashville, Tennessee	Active	
**Alpha Gamma**	April 26, 1926	Morgan State University	Baltimore, Maryland	Active	
**Alpha Delta**	1926	West Virginia State University	Institute, West Virginia	Active	
Alpha Epsilon (see **Theta Beta**)	April 3, 1927 – January 1971	Pittsburgh City-Wide	Pittsburgh, Pennsylvania	Inactive	(Note: This was a mixed chapter that included undergraduate and graduate members. It disbanded into Pittsburgh Alumnae and Theta Beta.)
**Alpha Zeta**	1927	Talladega College	Talladega, Alabama	Active	
**Alpha Eta**	January 10, 1930	Virginia State University	Petersburg, Virginia	Active	
**Alpha Theta**	March 30, 1930	Lincoln University of Missouri	Jefferson City, Missouri	Active	
**Sigma**	1929	Clark Atlanta University	Atlanta, Georgia	Active	
**Alpha Iota**	November 24, 1930	Wiley College	Marshall, Texas	Active	
**Alpha Kappa**	November 26, 1930	Huston–Tillotson University	Austin, Texas	Active	(Note: Founded at Huston College before the merger with Tillotson College)
**Alpha Lambda**	May 30, 1931	North Carolina Central University	Durham, North Carolina	Active	(Note: Was originally a mixed chapter of graduate and undergraduate members. The alumni members left to form Alpha Kappa Sigma in 1941,)
**Alpha Mu**	February 13, 1932	North Carolina A&T State University	Greensboro, North Carolina	Active	
**Alpha Nu**	May 16, 1932	University of Illinois at Urbana–Champaign	Urbana, Illinois	Active	
**Alpha Omicron**	April 17, 1933	Seattle City-Wide	Seattle, Washington	Active	(Note: Chapter originally was for both graduate and undergraduate members. In September 1979, the alumna formed Seattle Alumnae chapter, leaving the citywide chapter for the collegiate members.)
**Alpha Xi**	May 12, 1934	South Carolina State University	Orangeburg, South Carolina	Active	
**Alpha Pi**	1934	Kentucky State University	Frankfort, Kentucky	Active	(Note: Chapter was chartered as a mixed chapter that served both graduate and undergraduate members. In November 1944, the graduate members formed Beta Upsilon Sigma graduate chapter, leaving Alpha Pi to the collegiate members.)
**Alpha Rho**	June 17, 1934	Shaw University	Raleigh, North Carolina	Active	
**Alpha Tau**	June 30, 1934	Southern University and A&M College	Baton Rouge, Louisiana	Active	
**Alpha Upsilon**	1934	LeMoyne–Owen College	Memphis, Tennessee	Active	
Alpha Phi	March 9, 1935 – May 11, 1967	Wichita City-Wide	Wichita, Kansas	Inactive	(Note: This was originally a mixed chapter that included both graduate and undergraduate members. The chapter went dormant when the graduates formed the Wichita Alumnae chapter and the undergraduates formed Zeta Beta,)
Alpha Psi	1935–19xx ?	Tillotson College	Austin, Texas	Merged with Alpha Kappa chapter	(Note: Founded at Tillotson College before the merger with Hudson College)
**Alpha Chi**	1936	Tennessee State University	Nashville, Tennessee	Active	
**Alpha Omega**	December 13, 1936	St. Louis City-Wide	St. Louis, Missouri	Active	(Note: This citywide chapter was chartered at Stowe Teachers College includes members from Fontbonne University, Harris Stowe State University, Lindenwood University, Maryville University, Saint Louis University, University of Health Sciences and Pharmacy, University of Missouri-St. Louis, Washington University in St. Louis, and Webster University.)
**Beta Zeta**	1936	Pittsburg State University	Pittsburg, Kansas	Active	
**Beta Alpha**	January 30, 1937	Florida A&M University	Tallahassee, Florida	Active	
**Beta Gamma**	March 20, 1937	Dillard University	New Orleans, Louisiana	Active	(Note: Chapter has been reestablished for May 2026.)
Beta Delta	1937–xxxx ?	Dallas City-Wide	Dallas, Texas	Inactive	(Note: This became the Dallas Alumnae chapter.)
**Beta Epsilon**	December 4, 1937	Virginia Union University	Richmond, Virginia	Active	(Note: This was chartered as a citywide mixed chapter, with both graduate and undergraduate chapters. Its members voted to form separate chapters on November 15, 1941. It 1942, it was officially split into Beta Theta Sigma alumnae chapter and Beta Epsilon collegiate chapter.)
**Beta Eta**	May 7, 1937	Alabama State University	Montgomery, Alabama	Active	
Beta Theta (see **Iota Kappa**)	May 22, 1937 – May 11, 1972	Phoenix City-Wide	Phoenix, Arizona	Inactive	(Note: Beta Theta formed as a mixed chapter, with both graduate and undergraduate members. In May 1972, it went defunct and split into the Phoenix Metropolitan Alumnae chapter and Iota Kappa chapter.)
**Beta Iota**	1937	University of the District of Columbia	Washington, D.C.	Active	
Beta Kappa (Original)	October 26, 1937 – February 5, 1947	Newport News City-Wide	Newport News, Virginia	Inactive	(Note: This chapter became Gamma Iota Sigma, a graduate chapter.)
**Beta Lambda**	1938	University of Toledo	Toledo, Ohio	Active	(Note: This was chartered as a citywide mixed chapter that included undergraduates attending the University Toledo and Mary Manse College, along with graduates residing in Toledo. In February 1972, the graduates formed the Toledo Alumnae Chapter and Beta Lambda became a city-wide undergraduate chapter.)
Beta Mu	June 11, 1938 – May 1977	San Diego City-Wide	San Diego, California	Active	(Note: This was a mixed chapter that included both graduate and undergraduate members. In 1977, it went dormant when the collegiate members formed Nu Upsilon and the graduate members formed San Diego Alumnae.)
Beta Nu	1938–1975	Gary City-Wide	Gary, Indiana	Inactive	(Note: This was a mixed chapter, including both graduate and undergraduate members. It became the Gary Alumnae chapter in 1975.)
Beta Xi				Inactive	
Beta Omicron (Original) (see **Gamma Mu**)	November 1938–March 1947	Knoxville City-Wide	Knoxville, Tennessee	Inactive	(Note: This was a mixed chapter, including both graduate and undergraduate members. It went dormant when it split into Gamma Nu for students at Knoxville College and Gamma Theta Sigma for its alumnae members.)
Beta Omicron (Second)	19xx ?–1978 ?	Corpus Christi City-Wide	Corpus Christi, Texas	Inactive	
**Beta Pi**	1938	Bluefield State University	Bluefield, West Virginia	Active	
**Beta Pi**	1938	Concord University	Athens, West Virginia	Active	
**Beta Pi**	1938	Mountain State University	Beckley, West Virginia	Active	
Beta Rho	May 29, 1938 – 1968	Fort Worth City-Wide	Fort Worth, Texas	Inactive	(Note: This was established as a mixed chapter, serving both graduate and undergraduate members. In 1969, its graduate members established the Fort Worth Alumnae chapter.)
Beta Tau	1938–1945	Milwaukee City-Wide	Milwaukee, Wisconsin	Inactive	(Note: This mixed citywide chapter became an alumnae chapter in 1945.)
**Beta Upsilon**	1939	Langston University	Langston, Oklahoma	Active	
Beta Phi (see **Zeta Pi**)	February 18, 1939 – 1969	Denver City-Wide	Denver, Colorado	Inactive	(Note: Chapter was mixed, serving both undergraduates and graduates. It went defunct when it split into Zeta Pi and Denver Alumnae.)
**Tau**	May 13, 1939	Wayne State University	Detroit, Michigan	Active	
**Beta Chi**	February 18, 1939	Lane College	Jackson, Tennessee	Active	
**Beta Psi**	March 24, 1945	Oregon State University	Portland, Oregon	Active	(Note: This formed as a citywide chapter that included both undergraduate and graduate members. In 1981, the graduate members split off to form the Portland Alumnae Chapter.)
**Beta Psi**	March 24, 1945	Portland State University	Portland, Oregon	Active	(Note: This formed as a citywide chapter that included both undergraduate and graduate members. In 1981, the graduate members split off to form the Portland Alumnae Chapter.)
**Beta Psi**	March 24, 1945	University of Oregon	Portland, Oregon	Active	(Note: This formed as a citywide chapter that included both undergraduate and graduate members. In 1981, the graduate members split off to form the Portland Alumnae Chapter.)
Beta Omega	March 6, 1945 – September 30, 1972	El Paso City-Wide	El Paso, Texas	Inactive	(Note: This was formed as a mixed chapter with both graduate and undergraduate members. In 1972, the undergraduates established Iota Gamma at the University of Texas at El Paso, El Paso, and the graduates became the El Paso Alumnae chapter.)
**Gamma Alpha**	March 12, 1940	Xavier University of Louisiana	New Orleans, Louisiana	Active	
Gamma Delta	1941–1969	Galveston City-Wide	Galveston, Texas	Inactive	(Note: Chapter was chartered to serve both graduate and undergraduate members. When the sorority discontinued mixed chapters, the graduate members formed Galveston Alumnae chapter.)
**Gamma Beta**	February 28, 1942	Washburn University	Topeka, Kansas	Active	(Note: This was chartered as a citywide mixed chapter, with both undergraduate and collegiate members. In 1981, the graduate members formed the Topeka Alumnae chapter.)
**Gamma Gamma**	March 28, 1942	Philander Smith College	Little Rock, Arkansas	Active	(Note: This was chartered as a citywide chapter for graduates and undergraduates. In 1952, the alumnae formed Delta Epsilon Sigma and Gamma Gamma became an undergraduate chapter for Philander Smith College.)
**Gamma Epsilon**	November 5, 1942	Texas College	Tyler, Texas	Active	(Note: This was chartered as a mixed chapter, including graduate and undergraduate members. In 1946, the graduate members formed Gamma Epsilon Sigma, now Tyler Alumnae chapter. The undergraduate chapter at Texas College was chartereed separately February 20, 1946)
**Gamma Zeta**	May 17, 1942	Morris Brown College	Atlanta, Georgia	Active	
Gamma Eta	June 6, 1942 – 19xx ?	East St. Louis, Illinois City-Wide	East St. Louis, Illinois	Inactive	(Note: This was either a mixed chapter of both graduate and graduate members or an alumnae chapter. It later became the East St. Louis Alumnae chapter.)
**Gamma Kappa**	1943	Buffalo State University	Buffalo, New York	Active	(Note: This was chartered as a mixed citywide chapter, including both undergraduate and graduate members. In 1979, the alumnae members formed the Buffalo Alumnae chapter and the chapter became collegiate. The collegiate chapter included Medaille College until 2023 when the college closed)
**Gamma Kappa**	1943	University at Buffalo	Buffalo, New York	Active	(Note: This was chartered as a mixed citywide chapter, including both undergraduate and graduate members. In 1979, the alumnae members formed the Buffalo Alumnae chapter and the chapter became collegiate. The collegiate chapter included Medaille College until 2023 when the college closed)
**Gamma Lambda**	1943	Johnson C. Smith University	Charlotte, North Carolina	Active	
**Eta**	November 17, 1944	Fort Valley State University	Fort Valley, Georgia	Active	
**Gamma Theta**	1946	Dayton, Ohio City-Wide	Dayton, Ohio	Active	
**Theta**	1946	Duquesne University	Pittsburgh, Pennsylvania	Active	
**Gamma Iota**	February 8, 1947	Hampton University	Hampton, Virginia	Active	
**Gamma Mu** (see Beta Omicron)	March 1947	Knoxville College	Knoxville, Tennessee	Active	(Note: Chapter formed by the splitting of Beta Omicron, a citywide chapter that included both collegiate and alumnae members.)
**Gamma Nu**	November 8, 1947	Indiana University	Bloomington, Indiana	Active	
**Gamma Xi**	November 24, 1947	Creighton University	Omaha, Nebraska	Active	(Note: This was originally a citywide chapter, including both graduate and undergraduate members. On July 1, 1981, the graduates established Omaha Alumnae chapter and Gamma Xi became a collegiate chapter.)
**Gamma Xi**	November 24, 1947	University of Nebraska Omaha	Omaha, Nebraska	Active	(Note: This was originally a citywide chapter, including both graduate and undergraduate members. On July 1, 1981, the graduates established Omaha Alumnae chapter and Gamma Xi became a collegiate chapter.)
**Beta Kappa**	June 5, 1947	Livingstone College	Salisbury, North Carolina	Active	(Note: Chapter was formed sometime after February 5, 1947 when Beta Kappa Original became name to Gamma Iota Sigma.)
Gamma Omicron (see **Theta Alpha**)	January 20, 1948 – 1971	Evanston City-Wide	Evanston, Illinois	Inactive	(Note: Chapter was chartered as a mixed chapter with both undergraduates and alumnae members. The collegiate members formed the Theta Alpha chapter at Northwestern University in 1971, turning Gamma Omicron into an alumnae chapter. It became the Evanston-North Shore Alumnae chapter in 1975.)
**Gamma Pi**	1948	Allen University	Columbia, South Carolina	Active	
**Gamma Rho**	1948	St Augustine's College	Raleigh, North Carolina	Active	
**Gamma Tau**	1948	Tuskegee University	Tuskegee, Alabama	Active	
**Gamma Upsilon**	1948	Benedict College	Columbia, South Carolina	Active	
Gamma Phi	1948 – May 2010	Winston-Salem State University	Winston-Salem, North Carolina	Inactive	(Note: In 2010, WSU suspended this chapter for ten years for hazing violations. However, it invited the sorority to return after four years of suspension, in 2014.)
**Gamma Chi**	1948	Claflin University	Orangeburg, South Carolina	Active	
**Gamma Psi**	February 16, 1948	Tougaloo College	Tougaloo, Mississippi	Active	
Gamma Omega	194x ?–20xx ?	Meharry Medical College	Nashville, Tennessee	Inactive	
**Delta Alpha**	1949	Bethune-Cookman University	Daytona Beach, Florida	Active	
**Delta Beta**	1949	Eastern Michigan University	Ypsilanti, Michigan	Active	
**Delta Gamma**	March 9, 1949	Texas Southern University	Houston, Texas	Active	
**Delta Delta**	1949	Alabama A&M University	Normal, Alabama	Active	
**Delta Epsilon**	1949	Alcorn State University	Lorman, Mississippi	Active	
**Delta Zeta**	1949	Bloomfield College	Montclair, New Jersey	Active	
**Delta Zeta**	1949	Kean University	Montclair, New Jersey	Active	
**Delta Zeta**	1949	Montclair State University	Montclair, New Jersey	Active	
**Delta Zeta**	1949	Rutgers University–Newark	Montclair, New Jersey	Active	
**Delta Eta**	November 4, 1950	University of Arkansas at Pine Bluff	Pine Bluff, Arkansas	Active	
**Delta Theta**	October 14, 1950	California State University, Sacramento	Sacramento, California	Active	(Note: This was chartered as a mixed chapter, serving both graduate and undergraduate members. In 1973, its graduate members formed the Sacramento Alumnae chapter and it became a collegiate chapter.)
**Delta Iota**	November 13, 1950	Grambling State University	Grambling, Louisiana	Active	
**Delta Kappa**	1951	Central State University	Wilberforce, Ohio	Active	
Delta Lambda	May 19, 1951 – May 19, 1975	Youngstown City-Wide	Youngstown, Ohio	Inactive	(Note: This chapter was chartered as a mixed undergraduate and graduate chapter. In 1968, some undergraduates split off to form the Zeta Gamma chapter at Youngstown State University. By the early 1970s, Delta Lambda had lost most of its collegiate members. In May 1975, it officially became the Youngstown Alumnae chapter.)
Delta Mu (see **Upsilon Sigma**)	1952–19xx ?	University of Maryland Eastern Shore	Princess Anne, Maryland	Inactive	
**Delta Nu**	April 18, 1952	Savannah State University	Savannah, Georgia	Active	
**Delta Xi**	November 8, 1952	Fayetteville State University	Fayetteville, North Carolina	Active	
Delta Omicron	1952–2013	Saint Paul's College	Lawrenceville, Virginia	Inactive	(Note: Chapter went defunct when the college closed.)
**Delta Pi**	November 4, 1952	Jackson State University	Jackson, Mississippi	Active	
**Delta Rho**	1952	Albany State University	Albany, Georgia	Active	
**Delta Tau**	1953	Cheyney University	Cheyney, Pennsylvania	Active	
**Delta Upsilon**	1953	Western Michigan University	Kalamazoo, Michigan	Active	
**Delta Phi**	August 1, 1953	Ball State University	Muncie, Indiana	Active	
**Delta Chi**	1953	Elizabeth City State University	Elizabeth City, North Carolina	Active	
**Delta Psi**	1954	University of Detroit Mercy	Detroit, Michigan	Active	(Note: Chapter used to include Marygrove College, which closed in 2019.)
**Delta Psi**	1954	University of Michigan–Dearborn	Detroit, Michigan	Active	(Note: Chapter used to include Marygrove College, which closed in 2019.)
Delta Omega	1955–19xx ?	Bishop College	Dallas, Texas	Inactive	(Note: Chapter went defunct when Bishop College closed.)
**Epsilon Alpha**	January 25, 1958	Delaware State University	Dover, Delaware	Active	
**Epsilon Beta**	March 26, 1960	University of Texas at Austin	Austin, Texas	Active	
**Epsilon Gamma**	May 21, 1960	Pennsylvania State University	University Park, Pennsylvania	Active	
**Epsilon Delta**	July 24, 1960	Temple University	Philadelphia, Pennsylvania	Active	
**Epsilon Epsilon**	April 30, 1961	Michigan State University	East Lansing, Michigan	Active	
**Epsilon Zeta**	1962	California State University, Los Angeles	Los Angeles, California	Active	
**Epsilon Eta**	1962	Stillman College	Tuscaloosa, Alabama	Active	
**Epsilon Theta**	December 1, 1962	Norfolk State University	Norfolk, Virginia	Active	
**Epsilon Iota**	October 5, 1963	Ohio University	Athens, Ohio	Active	
**Epsilon Kappa**	December 28, 1963	University of Memphis	Memphis, Tennessee	Active	
Epsilon Lambda				Inactive	
**Epsilon Mu**	1964	Kent State University	Kent, Ohio	Active	
**Epsilon Nu**	June 4, 1964	California State University, East Bay	San Francisco, California	Active	
**Epsilon Nu**	June 4, 1964	Mills College at Northeastern University	San Francisco, California	Active	
**Epsilon Nu**	June 4, 1964	San Francisco State University	San Francisco, California	Active	
**Epsilon Nu**	June 4, 1964	Sonoma State University	San Francisco, California	Active	
**Epsilon Xi**	June 11, 1964	McKendree University	Edwardsville, Illinois	Active	
**Epsilon Xi**	June 11, 1964	Southern Illinois University Edwardsville	Edwardsville, Illinois	Active	
**Epsilon Omicron**	1965	Bowling Green State University	Bowling Green, Ohio	Active	
**Epsilon Pi**	July 17, 1965	Brooklyn College	Brooklyn, New York	Active	
**Epsilon Pi**	July 17, 1965	LIU Brooklyn	Brooklyn, New York	Active	
**Epsilon Pi**	July 17, 1965	Medgar Evers College,	Brooklyn, New York	Active	
**Epsilon Pi**	July 17, 1965	St. Francis College	Brooklyn, New York	Active	
**Epsilon Rho**	July 19, 1965	Athenaeum of Ohio	Dayton, Ohio	Active	(Note: Epsilon Rho originally included the c the University of Dayton and Miami University. Miami University chartered Zeta Mu in 1969, and Wright State University joined the chapter.)
**Epsilon Rho**	July 19, 1965	Earlham College	Dayton, Ohio	Active	(Note: Epsilon Rho originally included the c the University of Dayton and Miami University. Miami University chartered Zeta Mu in 1969, and Wright State University joined the chapter.)
**Epsilon Rho**	July 19, 1965	Miami University	Dayton, Ohio	Active	(Note: Epsilon Rho originally included the c the University of Dayton and Miami University. Miami University chartered Zeta Mu in 1969, and Wright State University joined the chapter.)
**Epsilon Rho**	July 19, 1965	Otterbein University	Dayton, Ohio	Active	(Note: Epsilon Rho originally included the c the University of Dayton and Miami University. Miami University chartered Zeta Mu in 1969, and Wright State University joined the chapter.)
**Epsilon Rho**	July 19, 1965	University of Dayton	Dayton, Ohio	Active	(Note: Epsilon Rho originally included the c the University of Dayton and Miami University. Miami University chartered Zeta Mu in 1969, and Wright State University joined the chapter.)
**Epsilon Rho**	July 19, 1965	Wright State University	Dayton, Ohio	Active	(Note: Epsilon Rho originally included the c the University of Dayton and Miami University. Miami University chartered Zeta Mu in 1969, and Wright State University joined the chapter.)
**Epsilon Tau**	July 31, 1965	City College of New York	Manhattan and Bronx, New York City, New York	Active	
**Epsilon Tau**	July 31, 1965	Monroe University	Manhattan and Bronx, New York City, New York	Active	
**Epsilon Tau**	July 31, 1965	New York Institute of Technology	Manhattan and Bronx, New York City, New York	Active	
Epsilon Upsilon	March 12, 1966 – xxxx ?; April 26, 2008 – 20xx ?	Hartford City-Wide	Hartford, Connecticut	Inactive	(Note: This was chartered as Hartford Colony Chapter, later Hartford Citywide. During its existence, it included at various times, the University of Connecticut, Trinity College, St. Joseph College, the University of Hartford, Eastern Connecticut State University, Central Connecticut State University, Western Connecticut State University, Hartford College for Women, Springfield College, the University of Bridgeport, American International College, Smith College, and the University of Massachusetts Springfield.)
**Epsilon Phi**	March 27, 1966	Drexel University	Philadelphia, Pennsylvania	Active	(Note: The Gamma chapter merged with this citywide chapter in the 1960s, but the members from the University of Pennsylvania reactivated the collegiate chapter in 1996.)
**Epsilon Phi**	March 27, 1966	La Salle University	Philadelphia, Pennsylvania	Active	(Note: The Gamma chapter merged with this citywide chapter in the 1960s, but the members from the University of Pennsylvania reactivated the collegiate chapter in 1996.)
**Epsilon Phi**	March 27, 1966	Saint Joseph's University	Philadelphia, Pennsylvania	Active	(Note: The Gamma chapter merged with this citywide chapter in the 1960s, but the members from the University of Pennsylvania reactivated the collegiate chapter in 1996.)
**Epsilon Phi**	March 27, 1966	Thomas Jefferson University	Philadelphia, Pennsylvania	Active	(Note: The Gamma chapter merged with this citywide chapter in the 1960s, but the members from the University of Pennsylvania reactivated the collegiate chapter in 1996.)
**Epsilon Phi**	March 27, 1966	University of the Arts	Philadelphia, Pennsylvania	Active	(Note: The Gamma chapter merged with this citywide chapter in the 1960s, but the members from the University of Pennsylvania reactivated the collegiate chapter in 1996.)
**Epsilon Chi**	April 30, 1966	Southern University-New Orleans	New Orleans, Louisiana	Active	
**Epsilon Psi**	May 21, 1966	Stephens College	Columbia, Missouri	Active	
**Epsilon Psi**	May 21, 1966	University of Missouri	Columbia, Missouri	Active	
**Epsilon Omega**	1966	Barber-Scotia College	Concord, North Carolina	Active	
**Zeta Alpha**	1967	University of Akron	Akron, Ohio	Active	
**Zeta Beta**	1967	Wichita State University	Wichita, Kansas	Active	
**Zeta Gamma**	February 17, 1968	Youngstown State University	Youngstown, Ohio	Active	
**Zeta Delta**	April 16, 1968	Bowie State University	Bowie, Maryland	Active	
**Zeta Epsilon**	1968	Coppin State University	Baltimore, Maryland	Active	
**Zeta Zeta**	1968	Culver–Stockton College	Kirksville, Missouri	Active	
**Zeta Zeta**	1968	Truman State University	Kirksville, Missouri	Active	
**Zeta Eta**	September 29, 1968	University of North Texas	Denton, Texas	Active	
**Zeta Theta**	November 3, 1968	Purdue University	West Lafayette, Indiana	Active	
**Zeta Iota**	November 11, 1968 –199x ?; 2002	Northern Illinois University	Dekalb, Illinois	Active	(Note: Chapter was suspended in the mid-1990s.)
**Zeta Kappa**	1968	Northern Michigan University	Marquette, Michigan	Active	
**Zeta Lambda**	1968	University of Central Missouri	Warrensburg, Missouri	Active	
**Zeta Nu**	1968	Indiana State University	Terre Haute, Indiana	Active	
**Zeta Mu** (see **Epsilon Rho**)	March 29, 1969	Miami University	Oxford, Ohio	Active	(Note: Miami University was originally part of the Epsilon Rho City-Wide chapter, in 1965.)
**Zeta Xi**	April 18, 1969	Edgewood College	Madison, Wisconsin	Active	
**Zeta Xi**	April 18, 1969	University of Wisconsin–Madison	Madison, Wisconsin	Active	
**Zeta Pi** (see Beta Phi)	May 10, 1969	Colorado College	Denver, Colorado	Active	(Note: Chapter formed by the collegiate members of Beta Phi.)
**Zeta Pi** (see Beta Phi)	May 10, 1969	Metropolitan State University of Denver	Denver, Colorado	Active	(Note: Chapter formed by the collegiate members of Beta Phi.)
**Zeta Pi** (see Beta Phi)	May 10, 1969	University of Colorado Colorado Springs	Denver, Colorado	Active	(Note: Chapter formed by the collegiate members of Beta Phi.)
**Zeta Pi** (see Beta Phi)	May 10, 1969	University of Denver	Denver, Colorado	Active	(Note: Chapter formed by the collegiate members of Beta Phi.)
**Zeta Pi** (see Beta Phi)	May 10, 1969	University of Northern Colorado	Denver, Colorado	Active	(Note: Chapter formed by the collegiate members of Beta Phi.)
Zeta Omicron (see Omcrion Delta and Omincron Eta)	May 18, 1969 – 1980	Greensboro City-Wide	Greensboro, North Carolina	Inactive	(Note: This chapter went inactive when it split into Omicron Delta chapter at Bennett College and Omicron Eta chapter at the University of North Carolina at Greensboro.)
**Zeta Rho**	1969–xxxx ?, 2021	Ferris State University	Big Rapids, Michigan	Active	
**Zeta Sigma**	May 29, 1969	University of Houston	Houston, Texas	Active	
**Zeta Tau**	1969	Florida Memorial University	Miami Gardens, Florida	Active	
**Zeta Upsilon**	May 31, 1969	Our Lady of the Lake University	San Antonio, Texas	Active	
**Zeta Upsilon**	May 31, 1969	Texas Lutheran University	San Antonio, Texas	Active	
**Zeta Upsilon**	May 31, 1969	Trinity University	San Antonio, Texas	Active	
**Zeta Upsilon**	May 31, 1969	University of the Incarnate Word	San Antonio, Texas	Active	
**Zeta Phi**	May 30, 1969	Georgia State University	Atlanta, Georgia	Active	
**Zeta Chi**	1969	Southern Illinois University	Carbondale, Illinois	Active	
**Zeta Psi**	1969	University of Georgia	Athens, Georgia	Active	
**Zeta Omega**	December 12, 1969	Lincoln University	Lincoln, Pennsylvania	Active	
**Eta Alpha**	1969	Mississippi Valley State University	Itta Bena, Mississippi	Active	
**Eta Beta**	December 19, 1969	Prairie View A&M University	Prairie View, Texas	Active	
**Eta Gamma**	January 17, 1970	Kansas State University	Manhattan, Kansas	Active	
Eta Delta	January 24, 1970 – June 30, 2020	Texas Woman's University	Denton, Texas	Inactive	(Note: In 2020, the university suspended the chapter for hazing violations until June 30, 2025.)
**Eta Epsilon**	February 7, 1970	West Texas A&M University	Canyon, Texas	Active	
**Eta Zeta**	March 14, 1970	Western Kentucky University	Bowling Green, Kentucky	Active	
**Eta Eta**	1970	Western Illinois University	Macomb, Illinois	Active	
**Eta Theta**	1970	Paine College	Augusta, Georgia	Active	
**Eta Iota**	April 24, 1970	University of New Mexico	Albuquerque, New Mexico	Active	
**Eta Kappa**	April 11, 1970	Spelman College	Atlanta, Georgia	Active	
**Eta Lambda**	April 17, 1970	Texas Tech University	Lubbock, Texas	Active	
Eta Mu				Inactive	
**Eta Nu**	1970	Miles College	Birmingham, Alabama	Active	
**Eta Xi**	1970	University of Tennessee at Martin	Martin, Tennessee	Active	
**Eta Omicron**	1970	Morehead State University	Morehead, Kentucky	Active	
**Eta Pi**	1970	University of Missouri-St. Louis	St. Louis, Missouri	Active	
**Eta Rho**	1970	Eastern Kentucky University	Richmond, Kentucky	Active	
**Eta Sigma**	1970	Northeastern State University	Tahlequah, Oklahoma	Active	
**Eta Tau**	1970	Virginia Commonwealth University	Richmond, Virginia	Active	
**Eta Upsilon**	May 22, 1970	Murray State University	Murray, Kentucky	Active	
**Eta Phi**	1970	Voorhees College	Denmark, South Carolina	Active	
**Eta Chi**	1970	University of Nevada, Las Vegas	Paradise, Nevada	Active	
**Eta Psi**	December 14, 1976	Lamar University	Beaumont, Texas	Active	
**Eta Omega**	November 1970	San Jose State University	San Jose, California	Active	
**Theta Alpha** (see Gamma Omicron)	1971	National Louis University	Evanston, Illinois	Active	(Note: Chapter formed as a split from Gamma Omicron, previously a mixed graduate and undergraduate chapter.)
**Theta Alpha** (see Gamma Omicron)	1971	Northwestern University	Evanston, Illinois	Active	(Note: Chapter formed as a split from Gamma Omicron, previously a mixed graduate and undergraduate chapter.)
**Theta Beta** (see Alpha Epsilon)	January 1971	Carlow University	Pittsburgh, Pennsylvania	Active	(Note: Formed by the collegiate members of Alpha Epsilon, a mixed chapter that included undergraduate and graduate members.)
**Theta Beta** (see Alpha Epsilon)	January 1971	Carnegie Mellon University	Pittsburgh, Pennsylvania	Active	(Note: Formed by the collegiate members of Alpha Epsilon, a mixed chapter that included undergraduate and graduate members.)
**Theta Beta** (see Alpha Epsilon)	January 1971	Chatham University	Pittsburgh, Pennsylvania	Active	(Note: Formed by the collegiate members of Alpha Epsilon, a mixed chapter that included undergraduate and graduate members.)
**Theta Beta** (see Alpha Epsilon)	January 1971	Robert Morris University	Pittsburgh, Pennsylvania	Active	(Note: Formed by the collegiate members of Alpha Epsilon, a mixed chapter that included undergraduate and graduate members.)
**Theta Gamma**	February 6, 1971	Stephen F. Austin State University	Nacogdoches, Texas	Active	
Theta Delta (Original)	February 13, 1971 – 19xx ?	Illinois State University	Normal, Illinois	Inactive	
**Theta Delta** (see Theta Delta (Original) and Iota Zeta)	2002	Normal City-Wide	Normal, Illinois	Active	(Note: This was re-established as a citywide chapter including Illinois State University (the former Theta Delta (Original) and Illinois Wesleyan University, formerly Iota Zeta.)
**Theta Epsilon**	1971	Bradley University	Peoria, Illinois	Active	
**Theta Zeta**	1971	Eastern Illinois University	Charleston, Illinois	Active	
**Theta Eta**	April 3, 1971	Cleveland City-Wide	Cleveland, Ohio	Active	(Note: Theta Eta was chartered at Cleveland State University and became a citywide chapter that includes Baldwin Wallace University, Case Western Reserve University, the Cleveland Institute of Art, the Cleveland Institute of Music, Cleveland State University, John Carroll University, Notre Dame College, and Ursuline College.)
**Tenacious Theta Theta**	April 24, 1971	Central Michigan University	Mount Pleasant, Michigan	Active	
**Theta Iota**	1971	University of North Carolina at Wilmington	Wilmington, North Carolina	Active	
**Theta Kappa**	May 2, 1971	Jarvis Christian College	Hawkins, Texas	Active	
**Theta Lambda**	1971	Emporia State University	Emporia, Kansas	Active	
**Theta Mu**	1971	Oklahoma State University	Stillwater, Oklahoma	Active	
**Theta Nu**	May 10, 1971	East Texas A&M University	Commerce, Texas	Active	(Note: Texas A&M University at Commerce changed its name to East Texas A&M University on 7 November 2024.)
**Theta Xi**	April 10, 1971	University of Louisiana at Lafayette	Lafayette, Louisiana	Active	
**Theta Omicron**	1971	Culver-Stockton College	Canton, Missouri	Active	
**Theta Pi**	1971	Rust College	Holly Springs, Mississippi	Active	
**Theta Rho**	1971	University of Tennessee at Chattanooga	Chattanooga, Tennessee	Active	
**Theta Sigma**	1971	Georgia Southwestern State University	Americus, Georgia	Active	
Theta Tau	May 28, 1971 – 202x ?	Valdosta State University	Valdosta, Georgia	Inactive	(Note: The national sorority suspended this chapter through April 22, 2028.)
**Theta Upsilon**	1971	William Paterson University	Wayne, New Jersey	Active	
**Theta Phi**	June 3, 1971	Columbus State University	Columbus, Georgia	Active	
**Theta Chi**	June 27, 1971	Rowan University	Glassboro, New Jersey	Active	
**Theta Chi**	June 27, 1971	Rutgers University–Camden	Glassboro, New Jersey	Active	
**Theta Chi**	June 27, 1971	Stockton University	Glassboro, New Jersey	Active	
Theta Psi	1971–xxxx ?	Los Angeles City-Wide	Los Angeles, California	Inactive	
**Theta Omega**	1971	Marshall University	Huntington, West Virginia	Active	
**Iota Alpha**	December 11, 1971	James Madison University	Harrisonburg, Virginia	Active	
**Iota Beta**	1972	The College of New Jersey	Trenton, New Jersey	Active	(Note: This was previously a Trenton, New Jersey Citywide chapter.)
Iota Gamma	September 1972 – xxxx ?	University of Texas at El Paso	El Paso, Texas	Inactive	(Note: Chapter formed by the undergraduate members of Beta Omega, a citywide chapter that included both collegiate and graduate members.)
**Iota Delta**	February 12, 1972	Henderson State University	Arkadelphia, Arkansas	Active	
**Iota Epsilon**	1972	Eureka College	Eureka, Illinois	Active	
Iota Zeta (see **Theta Delta**)	1972–1983	Illinois Wesleyan University	Bloomington, Illinois	Active	
**Iota Eta**	April 22, 1972	Texas Christian University	Fort Worth, Texas	Active	
**Iota Theta**	May 17, 1972 – December 2017, 20xx ?	Louisiana State University	Baton Rouge, Louisiana	Active	(Note: LSU suspended this chapter in 2017, resulting in the national sorority suspending the chapter until July 28, 2019.)
**Iota Iota**	May 7, 1972	Catholic University of America	Washington, D.C.	Active	
**Iota Iota**	May 7, 1972	Trinity Washington University	Washington, D.C.	Active	
**Iota Kappa**	May 12, 1972	Arizona State University	Tempe, Arizona	Active	(Note: Formed from Beta Theta a citywide chapter with both collegiate and graduate members.)
**Iota Lambda**	May 12, 1972	University of Alabama at Birmingham	Birmingham, Alabama	Inactive	
**Iota Mu**	May 21, 1972	Northwestern State University	Natchitoches, Louisiana	Active	
**Iota Nu**	April 23, 1972	Spring Hill College	Mobile, Alabama	Active	(Note: This used to be a Mobile City-Wide chapter, covering both the University of South Alabama, Spring Hill College and the University of Mobile.)
**Iota Nu**	April 23, 1972	University of South Alabama	Mobile, Alabama	Active	(Note: This used to be a Mobile City-Wide chapter, covering both the University of South Alabama, Spring Hill College and the University of Mobile.)
**Iota Xi**	1972	California University of Pennsylvania	California, Pennsylvania	Active	
**Iota Omicron**	1972	University of Central Oklahoma	Edmond, Oklahoma	Active	
**Iota Pi**	1972	Florida International University	Miami, Florida	Active	
**Iota Rho**	December 2, 1972	University of North Carolina at Charlotte	Charlotte, North Carolina	Active	
**Iota Sigma**	1973	Mercer University	Macon, Georgia	Active	
**Iota Tau**	1973	Middle Tennessee State University	Murfreesboro, Tennessee	Active	
**Iota Upsilon**	1973	Austin Peay State University	Clarksville, Tennessee	Active	
Iota Phi	1973–xxxx ?	Chicago West Suburban Area	Oak Park, Illinois	Inactive	
**Iota Chi**	February 17, 1973	University of South Carolina	Columbia, South Carolina	Active	
**Iota Psi**	1973	Southeastern Oklahoma State University	Durant, Oklahoma	Active	
**Iota Omega**	April 14, 1973	Texas State University	San Marcos, Texas	Active	
**Kappa Alpha**	April 15, 1973	University of Oklahoma	Norman, Oklahoma	Active	
**Kappa Beta**	May 12, 1973	Jacksonville State University	Jacksonville, Alabama	Active	
**Kappa Gamma**	1973	Lander University	Greenwood, South Carolina	Active	
**Kappa Delta**	1973	University of West Georgia	Carrollton, Georgia	Active	
**Kappa Epsilon**	May 24, 1973	Florida State University	Tallahassee, Florida	Active	
**Kappa Zeta**	1973	Millikin University	Decatur, Illinois	Active	
**Kappa Eta**	June 3, 1973	Alverno College	Milwaukee, Wisconsin	Active	(Note: Chapter was suspended until March 2022.)
**Kappa Eta**	June 3, 1973	Marquette University	Milwaukee, Wisconsin	Active	(Note: Chapter was suspended until March 2022.)
**Kappa Eta**	June 3, 1973	University of Wisconsin–Milwaukee	Milwaukee, Wisconsin	Active	(Note: Chapter was suspended until March 2022.)
Kappa Theta	1973–xxxx ?	University of Wisconsin Oshkosh	Oshkosh, Wisconsin	Inactive	
Kappa Theta	1973–xxxx ?	University of Wisconsin-Green Bay	Green Bay, Wisconsin	Inactive	
Kappa Theta	1973–xxxx ?	Lawrence University	Appleton, Wisconsin	Inactive	
Kappa Theta	1973–xxxx ?	Marian University	Fond du Lac, Wisconsin	Inactive	
Kappa Theta	1973–xxxx ?	Ripon College	Ripon, Wisconsin	Inactive	
**Kappa Iota**	May 31, 1973	University of South Florida	Tampa, Florida	Active	
Kappa Kappa	1973–xxxx ?	Baldwin-Wallace University	Berea, Ohio	Inactive	
**Kappa Lambda** (see Eta (Original))	April 27, 1973	Syracuse University	Syracuse, New York	Active	
**Kappa Mu**	April 27, 1973	Sam Houston State University	Huntsville, Texas	Active	
**Kappa Nu**	May 6, 1973	University of Southern Indiana	Evansville, Indiana	Active	(Note: This was originally the Evansville City-Wide chapter, covering both the University of Southern Indiana and the University of Evansville.)
**Kappa Xi**	May 12, 1973	Arkansas State University	Jonesboro, Arkansas	Active	
**Kappa Omicron**	July 21, 1973	University of North Carolina at Chapel Hill	Chapel Hill, North Carolina	Active	
**Kappa Pi**	1973	Delta State University	Cleveland, Mississippi	Active	
**Kappa Rho**	1973	University of Virginia	Charlottesville, Virginia	Active	
Kappa Sigma	November 10, 1973 – 2015 ?	East Carolina University	Greenville, North Carolina	Inactive	(Note: Chapter was suspended by the national sorority through 2025 for membership intake violations and allegations of hazing.)
**Kappa Tau**	1974	Texas A&M University–Kingsville	Kingsville, Texas	Active	
**Kappa Upsilon**	January 12, 1974	Auburn University	Auburn, Alabama	Active	
**Kappa Phi**	January 26, 1974	University of Maryland, College Park	College Park, Maryland	Active	
**Kappa Chi**	January 26, 1974	Louisiana Tech University	Ruston, Louisiana	Active	
**Kappa Psi**	February 14, 1974	Frostburg State University	Frostburg, Maryland	Active	
**Kappa Omega**	February 14, 1974	University of California, Santa Barbara	Santa Barbara, California	Active	
**Lambda Alpha**	1974	University of Wisconsin-Whitewater	Whitewater, Wisconsin	Active	
**Lambda Beta**	1974	Clarion University of Pennsylvania	Clarion, Pennsylvania	Active	
**Lambda Gamma**	1974	Franklin & Marshall College	Millersville, Pennsylvania	Active	
**Lambda Gamma**	1974	Millersville University of Pennsylvania	Millersville, Pennsylvania	Active	
Lambda Delta	1974–xxxx ?	Idaho State University	Pocatello, Idaho	Inactive	
**Lambda Epsilon**	1974	University of Missouri–Kansas City	Kansas City, Missouri	Active	
**Lambda Epsilon**	1974	William Jewell College	Kansas City, Missouri	Active	
**Lambda Eta**	March 17, 1974	Old Dominion University	Norfolk, Virginia	Active	
**Lambda Zeta**	March 23, 1974	University of Alabama	Tuscaloosa, Alabama	Active	
**Lambda Theta**	March 23, 1974	University of Arkansas	Fayetteville, Arkansas	Active	
**Lambda Iota**	March 30, 1974	Brown University	Providence, Rhode Island	Active	
**Lambda Kappa**	1974	University of Maryland Baltimore County	Baltimore, Maryland	Active	
**Lambda Lambda**	1974	Ashland College	Ashland, Ohio	Active	
**Lambda Mu**	April 26, 1974	Southern Arkansas University	Magnolia, Arkansas	Active	
**Lambda Nu**	April 27, 1974	Paul Quinn College	Dallas, Texas	Active	
**Lambda Xi**	1974	University of California, Davis	Davis, California	Active	
**Lambda Omicron**	May 25, 1974	College of Charleston	Charleston, South Carolina	Active	
**Lambda Pi**	1974	Grand Valley State University	Allendale, Michigan	Active	(Note: Chapter formed from Deltanette.)
**Lambda Rho**	October 26, 1974	University of Louisiana at Monroe	Monroe, Louisiana	Active	
**Lambda Sigma**	November 14, 1974	University of Mississippi	Oxford, Mississippi	Active	
**Lambda Tau**	1974	University of the Pacific	Stockton, California	Active	
**Lambda Upsilon**	December 13, 1974	University of Central Arkansas	Conway, Arkansas	Active	
Lambda Phi	1975–xxxx ?	Marquette University	Milwaukee, Wisconsin	Inactive	
**Lambda Chi**	February 21, 1975	University of Texas at Arlington	Arlington, Texas	Active	
**Lambda Psi**	March 11, 1975	University of Florida	Gainesville, Florida	Active	
**Lambda Omega**	April 5, 1975	Duke University	Durham, North Carolina	Active	
**Mu Alpha**	April 12, 1975	Virginia Tech	Blacksburg, Virginia	Active	
**Mu Beta**	1975	George Washington University	Washington, D.C.	Active	
**Mu Gamma** (see Theta (Original))	May 4, 1975 – 1991; Spring 2001	Cornell University	Ithaca, New York	Active	(Note: This was originally chartered as the Ithaca Citywide chapter by students from Ithaca College and grew to include Cornell University.)
**Mu Delta**	1975	University of Findlay	Findlay, Ohio	Active	
**Mu Epsilon**	May 9, 1975	University of Kentucky	Lexington, Kentucky	Active	
**Mu Eta**	May 10, 1975	University of Arizona	Tucson, Arizona	Active	
**Mu Iota**	May 16, 1975	University of Central Florida	Orlando, Florida	Active	
**Mu Zeta**	May 21, 1975	Carson–Newman University	Knoxville, Tennessee	Active	
**Mu Zeta**	May 21, 1975	Maryville College	Knoxville, Tennessee	Active	
**Mu Zeta**	May 21, 1975	University of Tennessee	Knoxville, Tennessee	Active	
**Mu Theta**	May 23, 1975	Elmhurst University	Romeoville, Illinois	Active	
**Mu Theta**	May 23, 1975	Governors State University	Romeoville, Illinois	Active	
**Mu Theta**	May 23, 1975	Lewis University	Romeoville, Illinois	Active	
**Mu Kappa**	June 21, 1975	University of Arkansas at Little Rock	Little Rock, Arkansas	Active	
**Mu Lambda**	1975	New Mexico State University	Las Cruces, New Mexico	Active	
**Mu Mu**	1975	Towson University	Towson, Maryland	Active	(Note: This was previously a Towson, Maryland Citywide chapter.)
**Mu Nu**	July 27, 1975	University of Southern Mississippi	Hattiesburg, Mississippi	Active	
**Mu Xi**	1975	Augusta State University	Augusta, Georgia	Active	
**Mu Omicron**	October 25, 1975	North Carolina State University	Raleigh, North Carolina	Active	
**Mu Pi**	October 26, 1975	University of Delaware	Newark, Delaware	Active	
**Mu Rho**	1975	Vanderbilt University	Nashville, Tennessee	Active	
**Mu Sigma**	1976	Cameron University	Lawton, Oklahoma	Active	
**Mu Tau**	January 18, 1976	University of New Orleans	New Orleans, Louisiana	Active	
Mu Upsilon	February 7, 1976 – February 3, 2020	College of William and Mary	Williamsburg, Virginia	Inactive	(Note: In February 2020, William & Mary suspended the chapter for hazing until at least the spring 2022 semester.)
**Mu Chi**	February 13, 1976	University of California, Riverside	Riverside, California	Active	
**Mu Phi**	February 14, 1976	Kettering University	Flint, Michigan	Active	
**Mu Phi**	February 14, 1976	University of Michigan–Flint	Flint, Michigan	Active	
**Mu Psi**	March 14, 1976	Johns Hopkins University	Baltimore, Maryland	Active	(Note: This was previously a Baltimore Citywide chapter, serving Johns Hopkins University, Goucher College, Sojourner-Douglass College, College of Notre Dame, Loyola University, and the Maryland Institute College of Art.)
Mu Omega	1976–xxxx ?	Georgia Medical College	Augusta, Georgia	Inactive	
**Nu Alpha**	1976	American University	Washington, D.C.	Active	
**Nu Alpha**	1976	Georgetown University	Washington, D.C.	Active	
**Nu Beta**	April 14, 1976	Mississippi State University	Starkville, Mississippi	Active	
**Nu Gamma**	1976	Northwest Missouri State University	Maryville, Missouri	Active	
**Nu Delta**	May 1976	Southeastern Louisiana University	Hammond, Louisiana	Active	
**Nu Epsilon**	1976	Augsburg University	Minneapolis and Saint Paul, Minnesota	Active	
**Nu Epsilon**	1976	Concordia College	Minneapolis and Saint Paul, Minnesota	Active	
**Nu Epsilon**	1976	Hamline University	Minneapolis and Saint Paul, Minnesota	Active	
**Nu Epsilon**	1976	Macalester College	Minneapolis and Saint Paul, Minnesota	Active	
**Nu Epsilon**	1976	St. Catherine University	Minneapolis and Saint Paul, Minnesota	Active	
**Nu Epsilon**	1976	University of Minnesota	Minneapolis and Saint Paul, Minnesota	Active	
**Nu Zeta**	1976	University of Massachusetts Dartmouth	Dartmouth, Massachusetts	Active	
**Nu Eta**	1976	Indiana University Northwest	Gary, Indiana	Active	(Note: Previously a Gary, Hammond, and Valparaiso, Indiana City-Wide chapter that included Indiana University Northwest, Purdue University Calumet, Valparaiso University, and Calumet College of St. Joseph.)
**Nu Eta**	1976	Saint Joseph's College	Rensselaer, Indiana	Active	(Note: Previously a Gary, Hammond, and Valparaiso, Indiana City-Wide chapter that included Indiana University Northwest, Purdue University Calumet, Valparaiso University, and Calumet College of St. Joseph.)
**Nu Theta**	1976	Troy University	Troy, Alabama	Active	
**Nu Iota**	May 29, 1976	Southern Methodist University	Dallas, Texas	Active	
**Nu Kappa**	1976	University of West Florida	Pensacola, Florida	Active	
**Nu Lambda**	February 26, 1977	California State University, Sacramento	Sacramento, California	Active	
**Nu Mu**	February 26, 1977	Loyola University New Orleans	New Orleans, Louisiana	Active	(Note: Nu Mu was chartered as a citywide chapter, originally including Loyola University, Tulane University, and Dominican College.)
**Nu Mu**	February 26, 1977	Tulane University	New Orleans, Louisiana	Active	(Note: Nu Mu was chartered as a citywide chapter, originally including Loyola University, Tulane University, and Dominican College.)
**Nu Nu**	1977	Shippensburg University of Pennsylvania	Shippensburg, Pennsylvania	Active	
**Nu Xi**	1977	Eastern Washington University	Cheney, Washington	Active	
**Nu Omicron**	1977	University of Montevallo	Montevallo, Alabama	Active	
Nu Pi				Inactive	
**Nu Rho**	April 24, 1977 – xxxx ?; 2014	Salisbury University	Salisbury, Maryland	Active	(Note: Chapter was originally the Maryland Eastern Shore Areawide, serving both the University of Maryland Eastern Shore and Salisbury State College. After going dormant, it reformed in 2014 as a single campus chapter.)
**Nu Sigma**	1977	Charleston Southern University	Charleston, South Carolina	Active	
**Nu Tau**	1977	Georgia College & State University	Milledgeville, Georgia	Active	
**Nu Upsilon**	May 7, 1977	San Diego State University	San Diego, California	Active	(Note: Chapter formed from Beta Mu, a citywide chapter that included both graduate and undergraduate members.)
**Nu Upsilon**	May 7, 1977	University of California, San Diego	San Diego, California	Active	(Note: Chapter formed from Beta Mu, a citywide chapter that included both graduate and undergraduate members.)
**Nu Phi**	May 21, 1977	Franklin University	Columbus, Ohio	Active	
**Nu Phi**	May 21, 1977	Mount Carmel College of Nursing	Columbus, Ohio	Active	
**Nu Phi**	May 21, 1977	Ohio Wesleyan University	Columbus, Ohio	Active	
**Nu Chi**	197x ?	Utica College of Syracuse University	Utica, New York	Active	
Nu Psi	197x ?–April 2016	Radford University	Radford, Virginia	Inactive	(Note: Chapter's charter was revoked.)
**Nu Omega**	197x ?	Franciscan University of Steubenville	Steubenville, Ohio	Active	
**Xi Alpha**	March 4, 1978	Georgia Institute of Technology	Atlanta, Georgia	Active	
**Xi Beta**	April 15, 1978	Winthrop University	Rock Hill, South Carolina	Active	
**Xi Gamma**	May 20, 1978	Hofstra University	Hempstead, New York	Active	(Note: Charters as the Long Island, NY City-Wide chapter but become associated with just Hofstra University in 1988.)
**Xi Delta**	1978	University of West Alabama	Livingston, Alabama	Active	
**Xi Epsilon**	July 1, 1978	Florida Atlantic University	Boca Raton, Florida	Active	
**Xi Zeta**	1976	Southeastern University	Washington, D.C.	Active	
**Xi Eta**	January 6, 1979	Georgia Southern University	Statesboro, Georgia	Active	
**Xi Theta**	February 9, 1979	Nicholls State University	Thibodaux, Louisiana	Active	
**Xi Iota**	February 10, 1979	University of South Carolina Upstate	Spartanburg, South Carolina	Active	(Note: Chapter was citywide until 2011.)
**Xi Kappa**	1979	California Polytechnic State University	San Luis Obispo, California	Active	
**Xi Lambda**	1979	California State University, Fullerton	Fullerton, California	Active	
Xi Mu				Inactive	
**Xi Nu**	May 19, 1979	Rutgers University	New Brunswick, New Jersey	Active	
**Xi Xi**	1979	California State Polytechnic University, Pomona	Pomona, California	Active	
**Xi Xi**	1979	University of La Verne	Pomona, California	Active	
**Xi Omicron**	1977	Francis Marion University	Florence, South Carolina	Active	
**Xi Pi**	1978	Rensselaer Polytechnic Institute	Albany, New York	Active	
**Xi Pi**	1978	Union College	Albany, New York	Active	
**Xi Pi**	1978	University at Albany, SUNY	Albany, New York	Active	
**Xi Rho**	1979	Morris College	Sumter, South Carolina	Active	
Xi Sigma				Inactive	
**Xi Tau**	1980	Babson College	Cambridge, Massachusetts	Active	
**Xi Tau**	1980	Bentley University,	Cambridge, Massachusetts	Active	
**Xi Tau**	1980	Massachusetts Institute of Technology	Cambridge, Massachusetts	Active	
**Xi Tau**	1980	Tufts University	Cambridge, Massachusetts	Active	
**Xi Tau**	1980	Wellesley College	Cambridge, Massachusetts	Active	
**Xi Upsilon**	April 12, 1980	Birmingham–Southern College	Birmingham, Alabama	Active	
**Xi Phi**	April 12, 1980	University of North Alabama	Florence, Alabama	Active	
Xi Chi	1980–March 2023	California State University, Fresno	Fresno, California	Inactive	
**Xi Psi**	1980	Washington State University	Pullman, Washington	Active	
**Xi Omega**	1980	University of California Irvine	Irvine, California	Active	
**Omicron Alpha**	1980	Queens College, City University of New York	Queens, New York City, New York	Active	
**Omicron Alpha**	1980	St. John's University	Queens, New York City, New York	Active	
**Omicron Alpha**	1980	York College, City University of New York	Queens, New York City, New York	Active	
**Omicron Beta**	1980	Edward Waters College	Jacksonville, Florida	Active	
**Omicron Gamma**	1980	University of Alabama in Huntsville	Huntsville, Alabama	Active	
Omicron Delta	October 25, 1980 – 202x ?	Bennett College	Greensboro, North Carolina	Inactive	(Note: Chapter formed from the split of the citywide Zeta Omicron chapter.) (Note: This chapter was suspended until November 2024.)
**Omicron Epsilon**	December 13, 1980	Mississippi University for Women	Columbus, Mississippi	Active	
**Omicron Zeta**	December 20, 1980	Oakland University	Rochester, Michigan	Active	
Omicron Eta	February 15, 1981 – November 5, 2014	University of North Carolina at Greensboro	Greensboro, North Carolina	Inactive	(Note: In 2014, UNC Greensboro suspended the chapter until October 2024 for hazing and other violations.)
**Omicron Theta**	February 28, 1981	Wittenberg University	Springfield, Ohio	Active	
**Omicron Iota**	May 9, 1981	Elon University	Elon, North Carolina	Active	
**Omicron Kappa**	1981	State University of New York at New Paltz	New Paltz, New York	Active	
**Omicron Lambda**	July 12, 1981	California State University Long Beach	Long Beach, California	Active	
**Omicron Mu**	January 23, 1982	Auburn University at Montgomery	Montgomery, Alabama	Active	
**Omicron Nu**	1982	University of North Carolina at Pembroke	Pembroke, North Carolina	Active	
**Omicron Xi**	May 30, 1982	Emory University	Decatur, Georgia	Active	
**Omicron Omicron**	1982	La Salle University	Philadelphia, Pennsylvania	Active	
**Omicron Pi**	April 9, 1983	Southeast Missouri State University	Cape Girardeau, Missouri	Active	
**Omicron Rho**	1983	George Mason University	Fairfax, Virginia	Active	
**Omicron Tau**	April 22, 1983	Christopher Newport University	Newport News, Virginia	Active	
**Omicron Upsilon**	April 30, 1983	Fairmont State University	Morgantown, West Virginia	Active	
**Omicron Upsilon**	April 30, 1983	West Virginia University	Morgantown, West Virginia	Active	
**Omicron Phi**	May 5, 1983	Clemson University	Clemson, South Carolina	Active	
**Omicron Chi**	June 2, 1983	Stanford University	Stanford, California	Active	
**Omicron Psi**	1984	California State University, Bakersfield	Bakersfield, California	Active	
**Omicron Omega**	March 24, 1984	Texas A&M University	College Station, Texas	Active	
**Pi Alpha**	March 24, 1984	Yale University	New Haven, Connecticut	Active	
**Pi Beta**	April 7, 1984	Rochester Institute of Technology	Rochester, New York	Active	
**Pi Beta**	April 7, 1984	SUNY Brockport	Rochester, New York	Active	
**Pi Beta**	April 7, 1984	University of Rochester	Rochester, New York	Active	
**Pi Gamma**	April 28, 1984	Western Carolina University	Cullowhee, North Carolina	Active	
**Pi Delta**	May 12, 1984	Stony Brook University	New York	Active	
Pi Epsilon	198x ?–xxxx ?	West Virginia University Institute of Technology	Montgomery, West Virginia	Inactive	
**Pi Zeta**	January 15, 1985–September 2006, 20xx ?	McNeese State University	Lake Charles, Louisiana	Active	(Note: Chapter was suspended until 2010 after allegations of hazing in September 2006.)
**Pi Eta**	March 17, 1985 – 2002; April 4, 2009	State University of New York	Binghamton, New York	Active	
**Pi Theta**	April 28, 1985	Dartmouth College	Hanover, New Hampshire	Active	
**Pi Iota**	June 2, 1985	American International College	Wilbraham, Massachusetts	Active	
**Pi Iota**	June 2, 1985	Mount Holyoke College	Wilbraham, Massachusetts	Active	
**Pi Iota**	June 2, 1985	Smith College	Wilbraham, Massachusetts	Active	
**Pi Iota**	June 2, 1985	University of Massachusetts Amherst	Wilbraham, Massachusetts	Active	
**Pi Iota**	June 2, 1985	Western New England University	Wilbraham, Massachusetts	Active	
**Pi Iota**	June 2, 1985	Westfield State University	Wilbraham, Massachusetts	Active	
**Pi Kappa**	November 20, 1985	Denison University	Granville, Ohio	Active	
Pi Lambda (Original)	April 19, 1986 – 19xx ?	Iona College	New Rochelle, New York	Reissued	(Note: In 1999, Pi Lambda at Iona College was recharted as a citywide chapter that includes Iona and Berkeley College, College of New Rochelle, Concordia College, Manhattanville College, Mercy College, Monroe College, Pace University, Sarah Lawrence College, SUNY Empire, and SUNY Purchase.)
**Pi Mu**	1987	Longwood University	Farmville, Virginia	Active	
Pi Nu	April 25, 1987 – xxxx ?	Southern Polytechnic State University	Marietta, Georgia	Consolidated	(Note: Chapter consolidated with Sigma Epsilon.)
**Pi Xi**	June 26, 1986 – 2008; 2020	California State University-Chico	Chico, California	Active	
**Pi Omicron**	April 14, 1988	Wake Forest University	Winston-Salem, North Carolina	Active	
Pi Pi	April 29, 1988	Louisiana State University - Shreveport Shreveport, Louisiana			
**Pi Rho**	May 1, 1988	LIU Post	Brookville, New York	Active	
**Pi Sigma**	May 1, 1988	State University of New York at Old Westbury	Westbury, New York	Active	
**Pi Tau**	1988	Adelphi University	Garden City, New York	Active	
Pi Phi	198x ?–202x ?	Fairleigh Dickinson University	Madison, New Jersey	Inactive	
Pi Phi	198x ?–202x ?	Ramapo College	Mahwah, New Jersey	Inactive	
**Pi Chi**	1989	California State University, Dominguez Hills	Carson, California	Active	
**Pi Psi**	1989	University of California-Santa Cruz	Santa Cruz, California	Active	
**Pi Omega**	1989	Aurora University	Aurora, Illinois	Active	
**Rho Alpha**	1989	West Chester University	West Chester, Pennsylvania	Active	
**Rho Beta**	December 2, 1989	Missouri State University	Springfield, Missouri	Active	
**Rho Gamma**	February 4, 1990	Christian Brothers University	Memphis, Tennessee	Active	
**Rho Gamma**	February 4, 1990	Rhodes College	Memphis, Tennessee	Active	
**Rho Delta**	December 15, 1990	University of Tulsa	Tulsa, Oklahoma	Active	
**Rho Epsilon**	1991	Princeton City-Wide	Princeton, New Jersey	Active	
**Rho Zeta**	1991	Poughkeepsie City-Wide	Poughkeepsie, New York	Active	
**Rho Eta**	April 21, 1991	Baylor University	Waco, Texas	Active	
**Rho Theta**	1991	Appalachian State University	Boone, North Carolina	Active	
**Rho Iota**	1991	Bloomsburg University of Pennsylvania	Lewisburg, Pennsylvania	Active	
**Rho Iota**	1991	Bucknell University	Lewisburg, Pennsylvania	Active	
**Rho Iota**	1991	Lock Haven University of Pennsylvania	Lewisburg, Pennsylvania	Active	
**Rho Kappa**	1991	Oberlin City-Wide	Oberlin, Ohio	Active	
**Rho Lambda**	1991	University of South Carolina Aiken	Aiken, South Carolina	Active	
**Rho Mu**	1992	Saginaw Valley State University	Saginaw, Michigan	Active	
**Rho Nu**	1992	Angelo State University	San Angelo, Texas	Active	
**Rho Xi**	1992	Xavier University	Cincinnati, Ohio	Active	
**Rho Omicron**	1992	Slippery Rock University	Slippery Rock, Pennsylvania	Active	
**Rho Pi**	1992	Gannon University	Edinboro, Pennsylvania	Active	
**Rho Pi**	1992	Mercyhurst University	Edinboro, Pennsylvania	Active	
**Rho Pi**	1992	Penn State Erie, The Behrend College	Edinboro, Pennsylvania	Active	
**Rho Pi**	1992	Pennsylvania Western University, Edinboro	Edinboro, Pennsylvania	Active	
**Rho Rho**	1992	University of Richmond	Richmond, Virginia	Active	
Rho Sigma				Inactive	
**Rho Tau**	1992	Millsaps College	Jackson, Mississippi	Active	
**Rho Upsilon**	1993	East Tennessee State University	Johnson City, Tennessee	Active	
Rho Phi	199x ?–202x ?	Kutztown University of Pennsylvania	Kutztown, Pennsylvania	Inactive	
Rho Phi	199x ?–202x ?	Lehigh University	Kutztown, Pennsylvania	Inactive	
**Rho Chi**	1993	Gallaudet University	Washington, D.C.	Active	
**Rho Psi**	May 14, 1993	University of Houston–Downtown	Houston, Texas	Active	
**Rho Omega**	November 21, 1993	Jacksonville University	Jacksonville, Florida	Active	
**Sigma Alpha**	November 21, 1993	University of North Florida	Jacksonville, Florida	Active	
**Sigma Beta**	1994	Adrian College	Adrian, Michigan	Active	
**Sigma Gamma**	1994	Davenport University	Grand Rapids, Michigan	Active	
**Sigma Delta**	October 15, 1994	Missouri University of Science and Technology	Rolla, Missouri	Active	
**Sigma Epsilon**	February 26, 1995	Kennesaw State University	Kennesaw, Georgia	Active	(Note: Originally included just one college but later absorbed Pi Nu chapter.)
**Sigma Epsilon**	February 26, 1995	Southern Polytechnic State University	Kennesaw, Georgia	Active	(Note: Originally included just one college but later absorbed Pi Nu chapter.)
**Sigma Zeta**	1995	Northern Kentucky University	Highland Heights, Kentucky	Active	
**Sigma Eta**	1995	Samford University	Birmingham, Alabama	Active	
**Sigma Theta**	April 7, 1995	Midwestern State University	Wichita Falls, Texas	Active	
**Sigma Iota**	1995	Lynchburg College	Lynchburg, Virginia	Active	
Sigma Kappa				Inactive	
**Sigma Lambda**	199x ?	Northwood University	Midland, Michigan	Active	
**Sigma Mu**	March 29, 1996	University of Texas at Dallas	Richardson, Texas	Active	
**Sigma Nu**	1996	Missouri Western State University	saint Joseph, Missouri	Active	
**Sigma Xi**	April 21, 1996	Coastal Carolina University	Conway, South Carolina	Active	
**Sigma Omicron**	1996	Brigham Young University	Salt Lake City, Utah	Active	
**Sigma Omicron**	1996	University of Utah	Salt Lake City, Utah	Active	
**Sigma Omicron**	1996	Utah State University	Salt Lake City, Utah	Active	
**Sigma Omicron**	1996	Utah Valley University	Salt Lake City, Utah	Active	
**Sigma Omicron**	1996	Weber State University	Salt Lake City, Utah	Active	
**Sigma Pi**	199x ?	Newberry College	Newberry, South Carolina	Active	
**Sigma Rho**	April 1997	University of Alaska Anchorage	Anchorage, Alaska	Active	
**Sigma Tau**	1997	California State University, Stanislaus	Turlock, California	Active	
**Sigma Upsilon**	1997	Carthage College	Kenosha, Wisconsin	Active	
**Sigma Upsilon**	1997	University of Wisconsin–Parkside	Kenosha, Wisconsin	Active	
**Sigma Phi**	April 26, 1997	University of Arkansas at Monticello	Monticello, Arkansas	Active	
**Sigma Chi**	1997	West Virginia Wesleyan College	Buckhannon, West Virginia	Active	
**Sigma Psi**	1997	University of the Virgin Islands	St. Thomas, Virgin Islands	Active	
**Sigma Omega**	1997	University of the Virgin Islands	St. Croix, Virgin Islands	Active	
**Tau Alpha**	1998	Armstrong State University	Savannah, Georgia	Active	
**Tau Beta**	1998	Indiana University of Pennsylvania	Indiana, Pennsylvania	Active	
**Tau Gamma**	1998	Fort Wayne City-Wide	Fort Wayne, Indiana	Active	
**Pi Lambda**	1999	Westchester County-Wide	Westchester County, New York	Active	
Tau Eta	April 21, 2000 – 20xx ?	Brenau University	Gainesville, Georgia	Inactive	
**Tau Delta**	April 22, 2000 – 2018, 2020	Loyola Marymount University	Los Angeles, California	Active	
**Tau Epsilon**	April 22, 2000	Clayton State University	Morrow, Georgia	Active	
**Tau Zeta**	May 3, 2000	Cal State Northridge	Northridge, Los Angeles, California	Active	
**Tau Theta**	May 7, 2000 – 20xx ?; April 2014	United States Military Academy	West Point, New York	Active	
**Tau Iota**	April 22, 2001	University of Tampa	Tampa, Florida	Active	
**Tau Kappa**	December 8, 2002	Rider University	Lawrenceville, New Jersey	Active	
**Tau Lambda**	April 26, 2003	Colorado State University	Greeley, Colorado	Active	
**Tau Lambda**	April 26, 2003	University of Northern Colorado	Greeley, Colorado	Active	
**Tau Mu**	2004	University of Nevada, Reno	Reno, Nevada	Active	
**Tau Nu**	2004	Belmont University	Nashville, Tennessee	Active	
Tau Xi				Active	
**Tau Omicron**	2004	Mercer University	Atlanta, Georgia	Active	
**Tau Pi**	April 30, 2004	Arkansas Baptist College	Little Rock, Arkansas	Active	
**Tau Rho**	April 30, 2004	University of Miami	Coral Gables, Florida	Active	
**Tau Sigma**	April 30, 2004	Florida Gulf Coast University	Fort Myers, Florida	Active	
**Tau Tau**	March 19, 2005	University of San Francisco	San Francisco, California	Active	
**Tau Upsilon**	2004	Tennessee Tech University	Cookeville, Tennessee	Active	
**Tau Phi**	2005	LaGrange College	La Grange, Georgia	Active	
**Tau Chi**	2005	University of Northern Iowa	Cedar Falls, Iowa	Active	
**Tau Omega**	April 23, 2005	Roanoke College	Salem, Virginia	Active	
**Tau Omega**	April 23, 2005	Washington & Lee University	Salem, Virginia	Active	
**Tau Psi**	April 24, 2005	Hope College	Holland, Michigan	Active	
**Upsilon Alpha**	April 30, 2006	High Point University	High Point, North Carolina	Active	
**Upsilon Beta**	200x ?	University of Virginia's College at Wise	Wise, Virginia	Active	
**Upsilon Gamma**	April 22, 2007	California State University, San Bernardino	San Bernardino, California	Active	
**Upsilon Delta**	April 29, 2007	Dickinson College	Carlisle, Pennsylvania	Active	
**Upsilon Delta**	April 29, 2007	Gettysburg College	Carlisle, Pennsylvania	Active	
**Upsilon Delta**	April 29, 2007	York College of Pennsylvania	Carlisle, Pennsylvania	Active	
**Upsilon Epsilon**	April 22, 2007	University of Texas at Tyler	Tyler, Texas	Active	
**Upsilon Zeta**	April 28, 2007	College of the Bahamas	Nassau, Bahamas	Active	
**Upsilon Eta**	April 16, 2009	Florida Southern College	Lakeland, Florida	Active	
**Upsilon Iota**	April 26, 2009	Chowan University	Murfreesboro, North Carolina	Active	
**Upsilon Theta**	April 30, 2009	Marymount University	Arlington, Virginia	Active	(Note: Chapter previously used the Art Institute of Washington which closed in 2018.)
**Upsilon Kappa**	April 30, 2009	University of Arkansas – Fort Smith	Fort Smith, Arkansas	Active	
**Upsilon Lambda**	20xx ?	North Carolina Wesleyan University	Rocky Mount, North Carolina	Active	
**Upsilon Mu**	March 27, 2011	Davidson College	Davidson, North Carolina	Active	
**Upsilon Nu**	April 28, 2013	University of Texas at San Antonio	San Antonio, Texas	Active	
**Upsilon Xi**	April 27, 2014	California State University Monterey Bay	Seaside, California	Active	
**Upsilon Omicron**	April 26, 2014	University of Bridgeport	Bridgeport, Connecticut	Active	
**Upsilon Pi**	April 27, 2014	Widener University	Chester, Pennsylvania	Active	
**Upsilon Rho**	November 19, 2016	University of Illinois Springfield	Springfield, Illinois	Active	
**Upsilon Sigma** (see Delta Mu)	April 15, 2017	University of Maryland Eastern Shore	Princess Anne, Maryland	Active	
**Upsilon Tau**	April 22, 2017	Villanova University	Villanova, Pennsylvania	Active	
**Upsilon Upsilon**	March 4, 2018	DePaul University	Chicago, Illinois	Active	
**Upsilon Phi**	November 18, 2018	Seton Hall University	South Orange, New Jersey	Active	
**Upsilon Chi**	October 9, 2020	Columbia College	Columbia, South Carolina	Active	
**Upsilon Psi**	October 11, 2020	Wingate University	Wingate, North Carolina	Active	
**Upsilon Omega**	April 30, 2023	California State University, San Marcos	San Marcos, California	Active	
**Phi Alpha**	November 18, 2023	University of California, Merced	Merced, California	Active	
**Phi Beta**	April 12, 2025	University of Connecticut	Storrs, Connecticut	Active	
**Phi Gamma**	April 19, 2025	University of North Texas at Dallas	Dallas, Texas	Active	
**Phi Delta**	April 2, 2026	Nova Southeastern University	Fort Lauderdale, Florida	Active	
**Phi Epsilon**	April 12, 2026	Winston-Salem State University	Winston-Salem, North Carolina	Active	
**Omega Omega**				Memorial	

== See also ==
- List of Delta Sigma Theta alumnae chapters
- List of Delta Sigma Theta national conventions
- List of Delta Sigma Theta sisters
