= Huda Totonji =

Saudi-born artist

Huda Ahmad Totonj
- Born: Riyadh, Saudi Arabia
- Education: George Mason University (BA, MFA), Art Institute of Washington
- Occupations: Visual artist, graphic designer, calligrapher, educator
- Known for: Calligraphy

Huda Ahmad Totonji is a Saudi-born visual artist, designer, and educator. Totonji is also a master calligrapher and is certified to teach Arabic Calligraphy. In addition to her calligraphic work, she also creates mixed media art, installations and performance art. Totonji is the president of Huda Art, LLC, which creates custom art for clients. Totonji is also the first person from Saudi Arabia to lecture at Harvard University.

== Biography ==
Totonji was born in Riyadh. She earned her bachelor's and master's of fine arts degrees from George Mason University. Totonji earned her Islamic Calligraphy Master's Certificate (Ijazah) in Jordan, and earned her PhD in fine art in Ireland. She studied Graphic Design at Art Institute of Washington.

Totonji has been teaching a graphic design at Dar Al-Hekma College, Jeddah, KSA. She often lectures in universities in Washington Metropolitan area and others the likes of Georgetown University, George Washington University, Howard University, Montgomery College, Oregon State University, Portland State University, Kansas State University, Penn State University, University of the Sciences in Philadelphia, Texas A&M University, and in Griffith University in Brisbane, Australia and others.

She has taken part in over 20 exhibitions worldwide and has a degree in visual information technology. Her paintings vary from portrait to landscape, from still life to calligraphy. She likes to mix things such as newspaper cuttings in her installations and performances. That is how she characterizes her painting, "the female vision is central to what she makes". In 2009 Huda has taken part at the Muslim Leaders of Tomorrow 2009 Conference in Doha, Qatar. She was elected among other 300 Muslim leaders from 75 countries to represent Muslim women there.

Totonji's work has been featured in the PBS film, Muhammad: Legacy of a Prophet. The Islamic Broadcasting Network (IBN) wrote that Totonji brings "a sense of reality and humanity to the idea of Muslim woman [...] Huda's goal is to revolutionize the idea that Muslim women are limited."
