= Saudi women in the arts =

The role of women in the arts and cultural life in the highly patriarchal society of Saudi Arabia is very limited. Below, examples of contributions in literature, music, cinema, and television that have been made by women in Saudi Arabia are discussed.

== Literature ==
In 1963, Thuraya Qabil became the first Saudi woman in the Hijaz to publish a poetry collection, with The Weeping Rhythms; she and other women from the region, including Fatna Shakir, 'Abdiya Khayyat, and Huda Dabbagh, became prominent in Saudi letters during the 1950s and 1960s. In 2011, Saudi writer Raja Alem became the first woman to win the International Prize for Arabic Fiction for her novel The Doves’ Necklace. In 2015, Ahd Niazy founded Jahanamiya, Saudi Arabia's first feminist literary magazine.

== Music ==
In December 2017, the first ever concert in Saudi Arabia by a female singer, with an exclusively female audience, took place at the King Fahd Cultural Center in Riyadh.

== Film and television ==
There is only one cinema in the entire country, an IMAX screen that is used only for documentaries.

Wadjda (Arabic: وجدة) is a 2012 Saudi Arabian drama film, written and directed by Haifaa al-Mansour. It was the first feature film shot entirely in Saudi Arabia and the first feature-length film made by a female Saudi director. It won numerous awards at film festivals around the world. The film was selected as the Saudi Arabian entry for the Best Foreign Language Film at the 86th Academy Awards (the first time the country made a submission for the Oscars,) but it was not nominated. It earned a nomination for Best Foreign Film at the 2014 BAFTA Awards.

== See also ==
- Contemporary Saudi Arabian female artists
- Culture of Saudi Arabia
- Saudi Arabian art
