= Saudi Art Association =

Saudi Arabian cultural society

- الجمعية السعودية للفنون التشكيلية
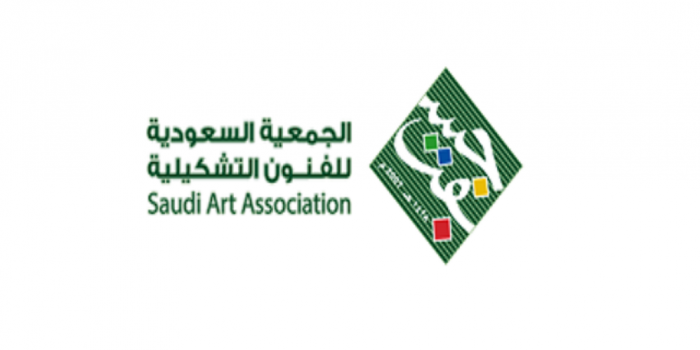
- Formation: 2007
- Type: Nonprofit cultural association
- Headquarters: Riyadh, Saudi Arabia
- Region served: Saudi Arabia
- Official language: Arabic
- Website: www.gsft.org.sa

The Saudi Art Association (SAA; Arabic: الجمعية السعودية للفنون التشكيلية) is a Saudi nonprofit cultural association focused on the visual arts. Established in 2007, it operates branches in several cities across Saudi Arabia. Headquartered in Riyadh, the association organizes exhibitions, workshops, seminars and lectures.

== Purpose and activities ==
The association states that its objectives include supporting the development of visual arts in Saudi Arabia, encouraging public engagement with art, protecting artists’ rights and supporting research. Its activities include exhibitions, workshops, interactive art events and cultural evenings. In September 2018, it organized the Nation of Honor and Dignity exhibition at the Ritz-Carlton in Riyadh, displaying more than 140 works by 125 artists. In September 2025, the association organized the third edition of a four-day exhibition in Jeddah featuring 45 works inspired by the city’s heritage and contemporary life.

== Branches ==
The association operates a network of branches across Saudi Arabia. As of 2026, its official website reported more than 20 branches.
