= Wadja =

- Website type: Instant messaging
- Available in: Multilingual
- Owner: Wadja Media Ltd.
- Website: Wadja.com
- Commercial: Yes
- Registration: required
- Launched: August 2006
- Current status: Active

Wadja solves the problem of conversation relevance (social noise) by giving users a way to label social activity, and curate that activity into meaningful conversations. Wadja is based in Cyprus and had its BETA launch in August 2006. As of December 2009, Wadja had over 5,000,000 registered users.

== Features ==
Wadja users can create interest labels, capturing an idea, an insightful topic and even a special offer or hot deal. Wadja.com supports multiple languages and users can translate the messages in other languages via integration with the Google Translate API. Almost all features of the Wadja website are also available on the mobile platform and are optimized for both the iPhone and the BlackBerry. iPhone and Windows Mobile applications are available on m.wadja.com.

Wadja can organize real time conversations and social content under customized “label” tags. Wadja's label feature lets individuals follow very specific topics and group discussions and can be applied to a variety of social content including real-time tweets and uploaded media (YouTube and Flickr). Labels can also be applied to communication activity including tweets and status updates. More than one label can be added to a conversation. Once a label is created, all the content and feeds within that label are easily searched or accessed by clicking the label name. Real-time, label driven conversations are completely searchable, and distributable across a variety of devices and platforms including email and web apps.

== Services ==
Wadja services include:

- an API that allows developers to access Wadja's product and offer them to their audience

== Security ==
Wadja.com enables its members to restrict who has access to their profile and data and choose what information they want to appear on their profile. Members' contact lists restrict who can contact them. Wadja's login supports OpenID.

Users' logins and API calls have their source IPs logged and Wadja explicitly warns users that their actions are not anonymous.

== Awards ==
The website was a recipient of several awards, including the Mashable Top Mobile Social Network: People's Choice Award in 2006 , the Blogger's Choice award at Mashable's Open Web Awards in the category of Niche Social Networks in 2008 and the 3rd Prize in the 8th Annual VC Forum, Athens, Greece.

== Criticism ==
Wadja's API for sending text messages has been criticized for using HTTP GET instead of POST.

== See also ==
- Mobile web
- Mobile advertising
- Mobile marketing
- List of social networking websites
