= Sarah Mohanna Al Abdali =

Saudi Arabian artist

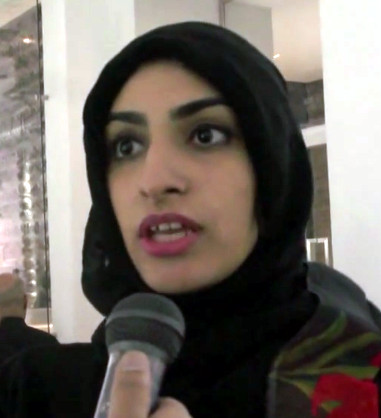
- Born: 1989; Jeddah
- Known for: Graffiti; street art
- Website: sarahalabdali.com

Sarah Mohanna Al Abdali (born 1989) is a Saudi Arabian artist, who is considered one of the country's first street artists. Her work combines Saudi and Arab cultural motifs and aims to provoke debate.

== Life ==
Al Abdali's family has its roots in the Hejaz region. She was born in Jeddah in 1989 and studied graphic design at Dar Al-Hekma College, continuing with post-graduate studies at The Prince's School of Traditional Arts in London. She began spray-painting graffiti in the historic section of Jeddah with the aim of provoking debate and one piece of graffiti commented on overdevelopment in the Muslim holy city of Mecca. She is considered to be one of the first Saudi Arabian street artists.

Al Abdali's art combines graphic design with elements from popular Saudi and Arab culture. Whilst she came to prominence as a street artist, she is also an illustrator, painter and ceramicist.

Al Abdali's work was included in "Soft Power" at Alaan Artspace in Saudi Arabia in 2012. Her work has been shown at the British Museum and in the exhibition "We Need to Talk" in Jeddah organized by the Edge of Arabia.

Since becoming a mother in 2020, Al Abdali's work has begun to explore motherhood as part of her "journey through life as a woman."
