= Hmoud Al-Attawi =

Saudi artist

- حمود العطاوي
- Born: 1986 (age 39–40); Sajir, Saudi Arabia
- Occupation: Artist
- Years active: 2006—present
- Notable work: "Blind Ants", "Connection" (2019), "Al Nourhah Pillars" (2021), "Maze of Delusion"
- Website: hmoudalattawi.com

Hmoud Al-Attawi (Arabic: حمود العطاوي, born 1986) is a Saudi multidisciplinary artist, with a focus on mediums such as sculpture, installation art, printmaking, and photography.

== Career ==
His artwork includes Blind Ants and Connection.

A key aspect of Al-Attawi's artistic narrative lies in his engagement with Saudi cultural heritage, as in the artwork Al Nourhah Pillars (2021), featured at the Diriyah Biennale.

Al-Attawi's work extends beyond the realm of aesthetics into societal issues. Maze of Delusion employs approximately 800 cement barriers, originally symbols of defense against terrorist threats to convey Riyadh's historical narrative and transformation within the context of contemporary art.

Dwelling (December, 2020) is an exhibition in which Al-Attawi featured as an artist.

In 2016, Al-Attawi co-founded Wasm Studio, an artistic and cultural community hub based in Riyadh, with contemporary Saudi artist Saad Howede.
