= Ola Hejazi =

Saudi Arabian artist and art teacher

Ola Hejazi (Arabic: علا حجازي) is a Lebanese-born Saudi painter, printmaker, and art teacher. She lives in Jeddah, and her influences include the Arabic alphabet, calligraphy and use of printed ink. She is also known for not titling her work.

== Career ==
She graduated from the Faculty of Arabic Literature, and has a diploma in educational psychology.

Her works are most often interwoven with the influence of constant relocations and attempts to reconstruct memories that are left behind. She has participated in various local and international exhibitions such as Earth Ever and After 21-39, Art Jeddah (2016), Nun Wa Alkalam, Islamic Arts Museum Malaysia (2013), Crounous & Karios, Essen Germany (2012), and Saudi Cultural Week in Korea (2012).
