= Safeya Binzagr =

Saudi Arabian visual artist (1940–2024)

- صفية بن زقر
- Born: 1940; Jeddah, Saudi Arabia
- Died: 12 September 2024 (aged 84)
- Education: St Martin's School of Art
- Known for: Darat Safeya Binzagr

Safeya Binzagr (Arabic: صفية بن زقر; Hejazi Arabic pronunciation: [sˤafijja bɪn zagɪr], 1940 – 12 September 2024) was a Saudi Arabian artist, active in the art scene of Jeddah. She opened a museum and gallery, the Darat Safeya Binzagr, in 2000. She was the only artist in her country to have their own museum.

== Early life and education ==
Binzagr was born in 1940 to a "well-known merchant family" in Jeddah. She was privately taught art in Egypt and went on to earn a degree from St Martin's School of Art in 1965.

== Career ==
Binzagr's first exhibition took place in 1968. In 1970, she was the first woman to hold a solo exhibition of her work in Saudi Arabia. Despite her art being presented, Binzagr was not allowed to attend the openings of her own exhibitions until Aramco held a private exhibition of her work in 1976. She was instead represented by male members of her family. In 1973, she chose to stop selling her art. In 1979, Binzagr published a book about Saudi Arabian art called Saudi Arabia, An Artist's View of the Past. The book has been translated into English and French.

Her work uses various mediums, ranging from oil paint, watercolor, pastel, drawing and etchings, and often centers around daily life in Saudi Arabia. She has series of works based on themes such as marriage customs, local costumes and old homes in Saudi Arabia. Binzagr paints cultural themes in order to preserve the cultural traditions of her country. Some of her paintings are based on descriptions given to her by older women about their lives. Binzagr meticulously researches her paintings, either by capturing through photographs images of buildings, craftwork and neighborhoods or by looking through historic documents and photography. Much of the history she has recorded belongs to the Hejaz cultural tradition.

In 1989, she started to imagine a place where she could permanently display and curate her work. The museum took about nine years of planning and construction and was opened in 2000. Binzagr's work can be seen at her museum, the Darat Safeya Binzagr, where admission is free. The museum serves as her home, her studio, and as a gallery of her work. Binzagr hosted public events at her museum to promote art in Saudi Arabia.

== Death ==
Binzagr died on 12 September 2024, at the age of 84.

== Legacy and art market ==
At Sotheby's Origins II sale in Diriyah on 31 January 2026, Binzagr's 1968 painting Coffee Shop in Madina Road sold for US$2.063 million. The Art Newspaper described the result as an auction record for Binzagr.
