= Art Institute of Washington =

For-profit art school in Arlington, Virginia (2000–2018)

Coordinates: 38°53′45.6″N 77°4′21″W

The Art Institute of Washington
- Type: For-profit college
- Active: 2000–2018
- Location: Arlington, Virginia, United States
- Website: www.artinstitutes.edu/arlington

The Art Institute of Washington was a for-profit college in Arlington, Virginia. It opened in 2000 and was a branch of The Art Institute of Atlanta. It was accredited by the Commission on Colleges of the Southern Association of Colleges and Schools (SACS). It closed in December 2018.

== Culinary program ==
The culinary program at the International Culinary School at The Art Institute of Washington received notoriety from several local media outlets, including The Washington Post, The Washington Times, and WRC-TV, NBC’s Washington, D.C. affiliate. The International Culinary School at The Art Institute of Washington offered three culinary-related degree programs and three culinary-related diploma programs.
