= Fatima Abou Gahas =

- فاطمة علي أبو قحاص
- Born: 1920; Rijal Almaa, 'Asir Province
- Died: 2010 (aged 89–90)
- Known for: Al-Qatt Al-Asiri
- Style: Traditional wall painting

Fatima Abou Gahas (1920–2010; Arabic: فاطمة علي أبو قحاص) was a Saudi visual artist from Asir Province. She was known for her work in Al-Qatt Al-Asiri, a traditional interior wall-painting practice associated with women in the Asir region. Abou Gahas is regarded as one of the most prominent practitioners of the art and contributed to its preservation through her work and teaching.

== Early life and training ==
Abou Gahas learned Al-Qatt Al-Asiri at an early age from her mother, Amna bint Mohammed bin Hadi, who was also remembered for her wall painting in Rijal Almaa. She began practicing the art at the age of eight. After being widowed young, she used wall painting as a livelihood while raising her children.

== Work and technique ==
Al-Qatt Al-Asiri is a traditional form of interior wall decoration practiced by women in Asir, especially in reception rooms known as majlis. The art uses geometric patterns, symbolic motifs and bands of bright color to decorate interior walls.

In Abou Gahas's practice, the main design was first outlined in black before colors were added. Saudi Aramco World described a workshop in which she laid out the design herself and marked where colors should be placed, while other women helped fill in the work. The same account noted that the room was completed in less than two weeks, while a majlis normally took one to two months depending on its detail.

== Teaching and preservation ==
Several years before her death, Abou Gahas taught her technique to women in a workshop at Qasr Bader, a house later preserved as a private museum. Her influence also extended to later practitioners of Asiri decorative art. Fatima Faye Al-Almaai, who later established a museum and training project for Asiri art, said that she learned the art from Abou Gahas and credited her with helping preserve it through teaching.

== Recognition and legacy ==
Abou Gahas received the Abha Award for national service in 1418 AH / 1997 and was selected as a leading heritage figure at the Janadriyah festival in 2007. After Al-Qatt Al-Asiri was inscribed on UNESCO's Representative List of the Intangible Cultural Heritage of Humanity in 2017, Arab News described Abou Gahas as the art form's most distinguished practitioner.

In 2023, Ithraeyat described an Asiri wall painting by Abou Gahas in Ithra's art collection and noted her role in sustaining and teaching Al-Qatt Al-Asiri until her death in 2010.
