= Dar Al-Hekma University =

- Type: Private
- Established: 1999; 27 years ago
- President: President: Dr. Abeer Al Doghaither
- Location: Jeddah, Makkah, Saudi Arabia
- Website: Official website

Dar Al-Hekma University is a private, non-profit institution of higher education in Jeddah, Saudi Arabia. Classes are taught in English. The University started in September 1999, with the approval of the Saudi Ministry of Education. It received the university status in January 2014.

Dar Al-Hekma University comprises three main schools: The Hekma School of Business and Law, School of Engineering, Computing and Design, School of Education, Health and Behavioral Sciences. The University offers master's degrees in seven different majors offered for both male and female students. The degree programs offered by the University are developed in collaboration with international universities, and are fully licensed, and recognized by the Saudi Ministry of Education.

== Academic Accreditation ==
In 2017, Dar Al-Hekma University has received for the second time the NCAAA Accreditation from the National Center for Academic Accreditation and Assessment.

== History ==
Dar Al-Hekma University, a pioneering project of the Al-Elm Foundation, was established in 1999 after nearly four years of intensive planning and successful implementation, with the objective of providing higher educational facilities and services through academic institutions such as colleges and universities in the Kingdom of Saudi Arabia. The medium of instruction for all degree programs is English.

The academic programs at the university were developed by the Texas International Education Consortium (TIEC), Austin, Texas, US. About 140 experts were recruited to serve on the various project elements teams to complete the task of developing the overall curriculum, the detailed course description and course syllabus as well as information on the laboratory component and text books, etc.

The first year, 120 students enrolled in three majors: management information systems, interior design, and special education. In 2002, the first group of graduates was honored at a ceremony by the late King Abdullah, Crown Prince at the time.

=== Community service ===
In an attempt to raise awareness of the importance of social responsibility, the university was the first educational institution in Saudi Arabia that introduced the community service program back in 2007. Each student is required to complete 100 hours of community service before graduation.

== Academic programs ==
Dar Al-Hekma University

Dar Al-Hekma University offers bachelor's degrees in 15 majors and seven different master's degrees from four schools.

1. The Hekma School of Business and Law:

Bachelor of Science in Banking and Finance

Bachelor of Science in Accounting

Bachelor of Science in Marketing

Bachelor of Science in Human Capital Management

Bachelor of Law

Bachelor of Arts in Diplomacy and International Relations

Master of Business Administration

Master of Arts in International Relations

2. The Hekma School of Engineering, Computing and Design:

Bachelor of Science in Cybersecurity

Bachelor of Science in Computer Science

Bachelor of Science in Information Systems

Master of Science in Information Systems

Bachelor of Arts in Interior Design

Bachelor of Arts in Fashion Design

Bachelor of Arts in Visual Communication

Bachelor of Architecture

Master of Architecture

3. The Hekma School of Education, Health and Behavioral Sciences:

Bachelor of Science in Psychology

Bachelor of Science in Speech, Language and Hearing Sciences

Master of Science in Speech-Language Pathology

Master of Science in Applied Behavior Analysis

Master of Educational Leadership

== The campus ==
Dar Al-Hekma University is housed in one integrated structure consisting of 26,500 square meters. The academic space includes classrooms, computer labs, science labs, faculty and administrative offices and a library student services and activities includes prayer rooms, counseling and career services center, health services, recreational facilities, offices, meeting rooms for student clubs, lounges and common room, gym, cafeterias and a 1200-seat auditorium.

== See also ==
- List of universities and colleges in Saudi Arabia
