= Lulwah Al-Homoud =

Saudi Arabian artist

Lulwah Al-Homoud (Arabic: لولوة الحمود; born 1967) is a Saudi Arabian artist, calligrapher, and curator. She lives in the United Kingdom.

She was born in Riyadh and studied sociology at King Saud University, going on to receive a MA from the Central Saint Martins College of Art and Design. Al-Homoud has trained with Pakistani calligrapher Rasheed Butt. She takes inspiration from Egyptian calligrapher Ahmed Moustafa.

Al-Homoud uses Arabic letters to create complex abstract patterns on paper using geometric forms and mixed media. She was a co-curator and also exhibited in the 2008 Edge of Arabia exhibition at the Brunei Gallery of SOAS, University of London. Her work has been included in exhibitions in China, Korea, New York City, Paris, Germany, Switzerland, Saudi Arabia, Dubai, Bahrain and Beirut. In 2015, she had a solo exhibition at the Sharjah Calligraphy Museum.
