= LJ Cryer =

American basketball player (born 2001)

No. 18 – Golden State Warriors
- Position: Point guard
- League: NBA

Personal information
- Born: October 9, 2001 (age 25) New Orleans, Louisiana, U.S.
- Listed height: 6 ft 0 in (1.83 m)
- Listed weight: 197 lb (89 kg)

Career information
- High school: Morton Ranch (Katy, Texas)
- College: Baylor (2020–2023); Houston (2023–2025)
- NBA draft: 2025: undrafted
- Playing career: 2025–present

Career history
- 2025: Santa Cruz Warriors
- 2025–present: Golden State Warriors
- 2025–present: →Santa Cruz Warriors

Career highlights
- NCAA champion (2021); Third-team All-American – AP, USBWA, NABC, SN (2025); First-team All-Big 12 (2025); Second-team All-Big 12 (2024); Third-team All-Big 12 (2023)
- Stats at NBA.com
- Stats at Basketball Reference

Lionel Cryer Jr. (born October 9, 2001) is an American professional basketball player for the Golden State Warriors of the National Basketball Association (NBA), on a two-way contract with the Santa Cruz Warriors of the NBA G League. He played college basketball for the Baylor Bears and Houston Cougars.

== High school career ==
Cryer played basketball for Morton Ranch High School in Katy, Texas. As a junior, he averaged 27.5 points, 5.8 assists, and 2.9 rebounds per game, earning District 19-6A MVP honors. In the regular season finale of his senior season, Cryer had a 50-point, 10-assist game against Mayde Creek High School. In his senior season, Cryer averaged 34.2 points, 5.3 assists, 2.6 rebounds and 2.4 steals per game. He finished with 3,488 career points, the most in Houston area public school history. Cryer was selected as All-Greater Houston Player of the Year by the Houston Chronicle, and repeated as District 19-6A MVP. A four-star recruit, he committed to playing college basketball for Baylor over offers from Houston, Colorado, LSU, Purdue and Stephen F. Austin, among others.

== College career ==
Cryer received limited playing time as a freshman at Baylor, averaging 3.4 points per game as his team won the national championship. On November 20, 2021, he scored 21 points in an 86–48 victory against Stanford. On January 29, 2022, Cryer was ruled out after aggravating a right foot injury. He averaged 13.5 points, 1.7 assists and 1.5 rebounds per game. As a junior, Cryer was named to the Third Team All-Big 12. He averaged 15.0 points, 2.1 rebounds and 2.0 assists per game. Following the season, Cryer transferred to Houston.

He averaged 15.5 points, 2.4 rebounds, 1.9 assists, and 1.1 steals per game as a senior. Cryer was named to the Second Team All-Big 12. He decided to return for his fifth season of eligibility. Cryer averaged 15.7 points, 2.4 rebounds and 2.0 assists per game. He helped the Cougars reach the NCAA championship game.

== Professional career ==
After going undrafted in the 2025 NBA draft, Cryer joined the Golden State Warriors for the 2025 NBA Summer League. On June 27, 2025, he was signed to an Exhibit 10 contract. Cryer was waived by the Warriors on October 18. For the 2025–26 season, he was added to the training camp roster of the Warriors' NBA G League affiliate, the Santa Cruz Warriors. Cryer signed a two-way contract with Golden State on December 2. On April 1, 2026, Cryer made his first career start, recording a career-high 17 points, one rebound, and three assists in a 127–113 loss to the San Antonio Spurs.

On 2 July, 2026, he joined the Warriors for the 2026 NBA Summer League. Cryer won the 2026 NBA Summer League Championship with the Warriors, beating the Memphis Grizzlies 94–90 in the final.

== Career statistics ==
Legend
GP	Games played	GS	Games started	MPG	Minutes per game
FG%	Field goal percentage	3P%	3-point field goal percentage	FT%	Free throw percentage
RPG	Rebounds per game	APG	Assists per game	SPG	Steals per game
BPG	Blocks per game	PPG	Points per game	**Bold**	Career high

=== NBA ===
Year	Team	GP	GS	MPG	FG%	3P%	FT%	RPG	APG	SPG	BPG	PPG
2025–26	Golden State	18	1	16.2	.402	.394	.895	1.6	1.0	.2	.0	8.2
Career		18	1	16.2	.402	.394	.895	1.6	1.0	.2	.0	8.2

=== College ===
Year	Team	GP	GS	MPG	FG%	3P%	FT%	RPG	APG	SPG	BPG	PPG
2020–21	Baylor	20	0	10.0	.382	.364	.643	.6	.8	.5	.0	3.4
2021–22	Baylor	19	3	25.9	**.476**	**.468**	.778	1.5	1.7	.8	**.1**	13.5
2022–23	Baylor	31	31	32.3	.453	.415	.894	2.1	**2.1**	.5	.0	15.0
2023–24	Houston	37	37	32.1	.411	.388	.871	**2.4**	1.9	**1.1**	**.1**	15.5
2024–25	Houston	**40**	**40**	**32.7**	.411	.424	**.895**	**2.4**	2.0	.9	**.1**	**15.7**
Career		147	111	28.5	.427	.413	.863	2.0	1.8	.8	.1	13.5

== Personal life ==
Cryer's father, Lionel Sr., played college football as a linebacker for Grambling State. His younger brother, Justin, played the same position at Royal High School in Brookshire, Texas, where his father served as defensive coordinator.
