= Brookshire =

Brookshire may refer to:

== Places ==
- Brookshire, Texas
- Powell–Brookshire–Parker Farm
- Brookshire Grocery Arena
- Houston Brookshire–Yeates House

== People ==
- Bethany Brookshire, American science journalist
- Bradley Brookshire, American musician
- Elijah V. Brookshire, American politician
- Stan Brookshire, American politician
- Suzy Brookshire, American softball player
- John Brookshire Thompson, British sociologist

== Other ==
- Brookshire Brothers
- Brookshire Grocery Company
- Brookshire Katy Drainage District
