= Justin Cryer =

American football player (born 2005)

No. 28 – Texas Longhorns
- Position: Linebacker
- Class: Senior

Personal information
- Born: July 21, 2005 (age 21)
- Listed height: 6 ft 1 in (1.85 m)
- Listed weight: 241 lb (109 kg)

Career information
- High school: Royal (Brookshire, Texas)
- College: Florida State (2023–2025); Texas (2026–present)
- Stats at ESPN

Justin Cryer (born July 21, 2005) is an American college football linebacker for the Texas Longhorns. He previously played for the Florida State Seminoles.

== Early life ==
Cryer was nicknamed "Juice" by his father at a young age. He did not like the name at first, but grew to embrace it. Cryer grew up considering baseball his favorite sport. He played baseball, basketball, and football through high school.

Cryer initially attended Morton Ranch High School in Katy, Texas, for his freshman and sophomore years before transferring to Royal High School when his dad was hired as their football team's defensive coordinator. As a junior, Cryer recorded 103 tackles, including 19 tackles for loss and five sacks, earning first-team all-district honors. He also hit .321 with five triples and two home runs on the baseball team. As a senior, Cryer registered 95 tackles, 20 tackles for loss, and six sacks.

=== Recruiting ===
Cryer was rated as a consensus three-star recruit. His first college offer was from Florida State. Cryer received offers from more than 20 colleges, including Arizona State, Arkansas, Georgia Tech, Northwestern, and SMU. He committed to playing college football for the Northwestern Wildcats on May 22, 2022, nine days after visiting the Chicago campus. Northwestern was one of the few schools that would let him play college baseball as well.

== College career ==
Cryer arrived at Northwestern during the summer of 2023. However, he entered the NCAA transfer portal soon thereafter due to the firing of head coach Pat Fitzgerald and the associated hazing scandal. "Yeah it's kind of a tough situation [...] But I just felt like new information was coming out everyday. I just felt like the best opportunity for me would be to take the hit and restart," said Cryer. On July 24, 2023, he announced that he would transfer to Florida State University to play for the Seminoles.

As a freshman in 2023, Cryer played in 13 games and posted 12 tackles, including six in the Orange Bowl versus Georgia. He recorded his first career interception on September 14, 2024, picking off Seth Henigan in a 20–12 loss to Memphis. Cryer finished the 2024 season with 32 tackles, two tackles for loss, one interception, and one fumble recovery. He appeared in nine games, making two starts, before suffering a season-ending leg injury during a goal line stand against North Carolina. In 2025, Cryer played in all 12 games and made eight starts. He posted 43 tackles, five tackles for loss, and one sack. After the season, he announced he would enter the NCAA transfer portal. Cryer was rated as a four-star transfer recruit by 247Sports. On January 9, 2026, he committed to transferring to the University of Texas to play for the Texas Longhorns.

Cryer made an immediate impact with the Longhorns at spring camp, drawing praise from head coach Steve Sarkisian for his performances, which continued into fall camp. He competed with Ty'Anthony Smith for the starting middle linebacker job. Smith was dismissed from the team in late August, allowing Cryer to strengthen his case for a starting role. He was named a starter alongside fellow transfer linebacker Rasheem Biles ahead of the season opener.

== Personal life ==
Cryer was born into an athletic family. His parents, Lionel Sr. and Tamica, played football and volleyball at Grambling State University, respectively. His older brother, LJ, plays for the Golden State Warriors, and their cousin Barry Cryer played football at the University of Nebraska.

Cryer was a multiple-time All-Atlantic Coast Conference (ACC) Academic Team honoree and a member of the ACC Student-Athlete Advisory Committee during his time at Florida State.
