= List of Delta Sigma Theta alumnae chapters =

Delta Sigma Theta (ΔΣΘ) is a historically African American sorority that was founded at Howard University in 1913. Historically, the sorority had collegiate, alumnae, and mixed chapters, with the latter including both graduate or undergraduate members.

Initially, the alumnae chapters were called graduate chapters and were named using the Greek alphabet, like its collegiate chapters. Due to the growing number of chapters, the sorority voted to abandon this practice in December 1956 at its national convention. Following the vote, graduate chapters were called alumnae chapters were renamed according to the community in which they were located.

In the 1970s, the sorority discontinued mixed chapters, resulting in the establishment of new alumnae chapters. Following is a list of its alumnae chapters.

Chapter	Former name	Charter date	Area served	State, province, or country	Status	Ref.
New York Alumnae	Alpha Sigma	January 1921	Harlem and south Manhattan	New York	Active	(Note: Chapter was originally called Alpha Beta. Its name changed to Alpha Sigma and, then to New York Alumnae in 1960.)
Washington D.C. Alumnae	Beta Beta	February 3, 1921	Washington, D.C.	District of Columbia	Active	
	Beta Sigma					
Cincinnati Alumnae	Gamma Sigma	January 1922	Cincinnati and Greater Cincinnati (northern suburbs)	Ohio	Active	(Note: Chapter was formed as Gamma Sigma. Its name changed in 1959 when it merged with the Beta Psi chapter, established in June 1945.)
Wilberforce Alumnae	Delta Sigma	1922	Clark County, Greene County, Miami Valley, and Montgomery	Ohio	Active	(Note: This was the fourth graduate chapter to be established. However, its charter date has been listed as 1934 and is still used.)
Baltimore Alumnae	Epsilon Sigma	March 19, 1922	Baltimore and Baltimore County	Maryland	Active	(Note: Chapter was formed as Epsilon Sigma. Its name changed in 1956.)
Tuskegee Alumnae	Zeta Beta (Original)	December 5, 1922	Bullock County, Jefferson County, and Macon County	Alabama	Active	(Note: Chapter was first chartered as Zeta Beta (Original)" in 1922. Its name was changed to Zeta Sigma (Original) in 1947. It was later changed to Tuskegee Alumnae chapter.)
Oklahoma City Alumnae	Eta Sigma	April 10, 1938	Canadian County, Cleveland County, and Oklahoma County	Oklahoma	Active	
Dallas Alumnae	Beta Delta	1924	Dallas and Dallas County	Texas	Active	
	Theta Sigma					
Atlanta Alumnae	Iota Sigma	1924	Atlanta	Georgia	Active	(Note: This chapter was founded as Iota Sigma Alumna chapter. Its name changed in 1958.)
Bexar Area Alumnae		1930	Bexar County (excluding San Antonio), Comal County, and Guadalupe County	Texas	Active	
North Jersey Alumnae	Kappa Sigma	June 11, 1939	Essex County, Hudson County, and Union County	New Jersey	Active	
Saint Louis Alumnae	Lambda Sigma	December 19, 1926	St. Charles County, St. Louis, and St. Louis County	Missouri	Active	
Norfolk Alumnae	Mu Sigma	September 1929	Norfolk and Virginia Beach	Virginia	Active	
Los Angeles Alumnae	Nu Sigma	June 16, 1929	Los Angeles and Los Angeles County	California	Active	
Philadelphia Alumnae	Xi Sigma	1927	Philadelphia, Philadelphia County, and Philadelphia Metro Area	Pennsylvania	Active	
Tulsa Alumnae	Omicron Sigma	April 30, 1930	Bartlesville, Broken Arrow, Jenks, Owasso, Sandy Springs, and Tulsa	Oklahoma	Active	
Nashville Alumnae	Pi Sigma	April 1930	Cheatham County, Davidson County, Robertson County, Sumner County, Williamson County, and Wilson County	Tennessee	Active	
Shreveport Alumnae	Rho Sigma	November 24, 1930	Bossier Parish, Caddo Parish, and De Soto Parish	Louisiana	Active	(Note: Chapter was chartered as Rho Sigma. Its name changed in June 1959.)
Austin Alumnae	Sigma Sigma	November 26, 1930	Austin	Texas	Active	(Note: Chapter was originally called Sigma Sigma. Its name changed in 1956.)
Birmingham Alumnae	Tau Sigma	May 28, 1931	Bibb County, Blount County, Chilton County, Jefferson County, St. Clair County, Shelby County, and Walker County	Alabama	Active	(Note: Chapter was chartered as Tau Sigma. Its name was changed in 1956.)
Baton Rouge Delta Alumnae	Upsilon Sigma ?	November 21, 1931	Baton Rouge	Louisiana	Active	
Charleston-Institute Alumnae	Phi Sigma	1932	Kanawha County, Jackson County, and Wood County	West Virginia	Active	
Lexington (KY) Alumnae	Chi Sigma	1932	Central Kentucky, Lexington, and South East Kentucky	Kentucky	Active	
San Antonio Alumnae	Psi Sigma	August 16, 1933	San Antonio	Texas	Active	(Note: Chapter formed as Psi Sigma and changed its name in 1958.)
Berkeley Bay Area Alumnae	Omega Sigma	March 30, 1934	Alameda, Albany, Berkeley, Castro Valley, Emeryville, Oakland, and San Leandro	California	Active	(Note: This chapter was founded as Omega Sigma. In 1979, its name changed to Berkeley Alumnae chapter. It later became the Berkeley Bay Area Alumnae chapter to reflect its service area better.)
Louisville Alumnae	Alpha Alpha Sigma	May 14, 1934	Louisville and Oldham County	Kentucky	Active	
Columbus (OH) Alumnae	Alpha Beta Sigma	May 20, 1934	Central Ohio, Delaware County, Fairfield County, Franklin County, Licking County, Madison County, Pickaway County, and Union County	Ohio	Active	
Memphis Alumnae	Alpha Gamma Sigma	1935	Shelby County	Tennessee	Active	
Dayton Alumnae	Alpha Delta Sigma	September 1, 1936	Clayton, Dayton, Harrison Township, Huber Heights, Jefferson Township, and Trotwood	Ohio	Active	(Note: Chapter was chartered as Alpha Delta Sigma and changed its name in 1956.)
	Alpha Epsilon Sigma					
	Alpha Zeta Sigma First (see Alpha Eta Sigma)	June 20, 1936 – November 1936	New Orleans	Louisiana	Name changed	(Note: Chapter's members requested a name change; it became Alpha Eta Sigma in November 1936.)
Raleigh Alumnae	Alpha Zeta Sigma	May 7, 1938	Johnston County and Wake County	North Carolina	Active	(Note: Chapter was chartered as Alpha Zeta Sigma. It was renamed in 1956.)
San Diego Alumnae	Beta Mu	June 11, 1938	Carlsbad, Chula Vista, El Cajon, Escondido, Kearney Mesa, Mission Valley, Rancho Bernardo, and San Diego	California	Active	(Note: Chapter formed as Beta Mu, a citywide chapter that included both graduate and undergraduate chapters. In 1977, the collegiate members formed Nu Upsilon and the graduates became San Diego Alumnae chapter.)
New Orleans Alumnae	Alpha Eta Sigma (see Alpha Zta Sigma First)	June 20, 1936	New Orleans	Louisiana	Active	(Note: Chapter was chartered as Alpha Zeta Sigma. Its members requested a name change and it became Alpha Eta Sigma in November 1936.Its became New Orleans Alumnae after the sorority changed its nomenclature.)
	Alpha Theta Sigma					
Jacksonville (FL) Alumnae	Alpha Iota Sigma	February 9, 1946	Clay County, Duval County, Nassau County, and St. John's County	Florida	Active	
Durham Alumnae	Alpha Kappa Sigma	April 25, 1941	Durham and Durham County	North Carolina	Active	(Note: Chapter was originally called Alpha Kappa Sigma and was formed by the alumnae members of Alpha Lamba, a mixed chapter that included both graduate and undergraduate members. It later became the Durham Alumnae chapter.)
Montgomery (AL) Alumnae	Alpha Lambda Sigma	August 1937	Autauga County, Elmore County, and Montgomery	Alabama	Active	
Roanoke Alumnae	Alpha Mu Sigma	May 1939	Roanoke	Virginia	Active	
Winston-Salem Alumnae	Alpha Nu Sigma	1939	Forsyth County	North Carolina	Active	
Lynchburg Alumnae	Alpha Xi Sigma ?	1939	Amherst County, Appomattox County, Bedford, Bedford County, Campbell County, and Lynchburg	Virginia	Active	
Boston Alumnae	Alpha Omicron Sigma	1945	Essex County, Middlesex County, Norfolk County, and Suffolk County	Massachusetts	Active	(Note: This was originally called the Alpha Omicron Sigma chapter and was formed by the alumnae members of Iota chapter, a citywide chapter that included both undergraduate and graduate members. It became the Boston Alumnae chapter when the sorority changed its nomenclature system in the mid-1950s.)
Detroit Alumnae	Alpha Pi Sigma	May 13, 1939	Detroit, Grosse Pointes Woods, Hamtramck, Harper Woods, and Highland Park	Michigan	Active	(Note: Chapter was originally called Alpha Pi Sigma and was formed by the alumnae members of Tau, a citywide chapter that included both undergraduate and graduate members. It became the Detroit Alumnae chapter in 1958.)
Muskogee Alumnae	Alpha Rho Sigma	1949	Muskogee	Oklahoma	Active	
	Alpha Sigma Sigma				Inactive	
Orangeburg Alumnae	Alpha Tau Sigma	July 12, 1943	Calhoun County and Orangeburg County	South Carolina	Active	
Jefferson City Alumnae	Alpha Upsilon Sigma	March 1939	Jefferson City	Missouri	Active	
Wilmington (NC) Alumnae	Alpha Phi Sigma	May 10, 1940	Brunswick County, New Hanover County, and Pender County	North Carolina	Active	
Jackson (MS) Alumnae	Alpha Chi Sigma	May 3, 1941	Jackson	Mississippi	Active	
	Alpha Psi Sigma				Inactive	
High Point Alumnae	Alpha Omega Sigma	January 21, 1950	Archdale, Greensboro, High Point, Jamestown, Thomasville, and Trinity	North Carolina	Active	
Charleston Alumnae	Beta Alpha Sigma	November 15, 1940	Greater Charleston County	South Carolina	Active	
Columbia (SC) Alumnae	Beta Beta Sigma	1940	Fairfield County, Lexington County, Newberry County, and Richland County	South Carolina	Active	(Note: Chapter was chartered as Beta Beta Sigma. Its name changed in 1958.)
Petersburg Alumnae	Beta Gamma Sigma	April 5, 1941	Colonial Heights, Chesterfield, Dinwiddie, Hopewell, Petersburg, Prince George, and Sussex	Virginia	Active	
Chattanooga Alumnae	Beta Epsilon Sigma	May 24, 1941	Hamilton County	Tennessee	Active	(Note: Chapter was chartered as Beta Epsilon Sigma. Its name changed in 1952.)
Topeka Alumnae	Gamma Beta	February 28, 1942	Douglas County and Shawnee County	Kansas	Active	(Note: This chapter started as Gamma Beta, a mixed chapter that included both graduate and undergraduate members. The graduates split off as Topeka Alumnae in 1981 after changes in the national sorority's policy.)
Savannah Alumnae	Beta Delta Sigma	May 15, 1941	Chatham County, eastern Bryan County, and Effingham County	Georgia	Active	
	Beta Epsilon Sigma					
Miami Alumnae	Beta Zeta Sigma	June 1941	Dade County and Miami	Florida	Active	
Mobile Alumnae	Beta Eta Sigma	1942	Mobile	Alabama	Active	
Richmond Alumnae	Beta Theta Sigma	1942	Richmond and Richmond Metro Area	Virginia	Active	(Note: The Beta Theta Sigma chapter was formed the graduate members of Beta Epsilon, a citywide chapterestablishedd in December 1937withh both collegiate and graduate members. Its name was changed to Richmond Alumnae chapter in 1958.)
Langston Alumnae	Beta Iota Sigma	March 8, 1942	Coyle, Edmond, Guthrie, Langston, Meridian, Perkings, and Stillwater	Oklahoma	Actice	
	Beta Kappa Sigma					
	Beta Lambda Sigma					
Greensboro Alumnae	Beta Mu Sigma	May 24, 1942	Guilford County	North Carolina	Active	(Note: Chapter was chartered as Beta Mu Sigma and changed its name in 1963.)
Beaumont Alumnae	Beta Nu Sigma	May 16, 1942	Beaumont	Texas	Active	(Note: This chapter formed as Beta Nu Sigma. It became Beaumont Alumnae in 1958.)
East St Louis Alumnae	Gamma Eta	June 6, 1942	Madison County and St. Clair County	Illinois	Active	
Charlotte Alumnae	Beta Xi Sigma	July 8, 1942	Mecklenburg County and Metro Charlotte	North Carolina	Active	(Note: Chapter was originally called Beta Xi Sigma. Its name changed in 1966.)
Fort Valley Alumnae	Beta Omicron Sigma	May 28, 1943	Fort Valley	Georgia	Active	(Note: Chapter was originally called Beta Omicron Sigma. Its name was changed in 1959.)
Portsmouth Alumnae	Beta Pi Sigma	December 21, 1943	Chesapeake, Norfolk County, and Portsmouth	Virginia	Active	
Waco Alumnae	Beta Rho Sigma	December 23, 1943	Greater Waco NS McLennan County	Texas	Active	
Port Arthur Alumnae	Beta Sigma Sigma	June 2, 1948	Port Arthur	Texas	Active	(Note: Chapter was chartered as Beta Sigma Sigma. Its name changed in 1959.)
Marshall Alumnae	Beta Tau Sigma	1944	Marshall	Texas	Active	(Note: Chapter was originally called Beta Tau Sigma. Its name was changed in 1956.)
Frankfort Alumnae	Beta Upsilon Sigma	November 22, 1944	Anderson County, Franklin County, Henry County, Louisville, Owen County, Scott County, Shelby County, and Woodford County	Kentucky	Active	(Note: The chapter was chartered as Beta Upsilon Sigma by graduate members of Alpha Pi, a mixed chapter with collegiate and alumnae members. It later changed its name to Frankford Alumnae chapter.)
Pine Bluff Alumnae	Beta Phi Sigma	December 1, 1944	Dumas, Gould, Grady, Jefferson County, and Thornton	Arkansas	Active	
Beckley Alumnae	Beta Chi Sigma	1945	Fayette County and Raleigh County	West Virginia	Active	
	Beta Psi Sigma					
Jackson (TN) Alumnae	Beta Omega Sigma	April 25, 1945	Gibson, Hardeman County, Haywood County, and Madison County	Tennessee	Active	
Milwaukee Alumnae	Beta Tau	1945	Kenosha, Milwaukee, and Racine	Wisconsin	Active	
Temple Alumnae	Gamma Alpha Sigma	October 1, 1945	Belton and Temple	Texas	Active	(Note: Chapter was chartered as Gamma Alpha Sigma. Its name changed in 1953.)
Oxford-Henderson Alumnae	Gamma Beta Sigma	May 10, 1945	Franklin County, Granville County, Vance County, Warren County, and Mecklenburg County	North Carolina	Active	(Note: Chapter was chartered as Gamma Beta Sigma. Its name was changed in August 1958.)
Danville Alumnae	Gamma Gamma Sigma	April 6, 1946	Caswell County, Danville, Halifax, and Pittsylvania County	Virginia	Active	(Note: This chapter was chartered as Gamma Gamma Sigma and was renamed in 1960.)
	Gamma Delta Sigma					
Tyler Alumnae	Gamma Epsilon Sigma	1946	Smith County	Texas	Active	(Note: Chapter was charted as Gamma Epsilon Sigma by the graduate members of Gamma Epsilon, a mixed chapter of graduate and undergraduate members that was established in 1942. It was renamed Tyler Alumnae in 1958.)
Daytona Beach Alumnae	Gamma Zeta Sigma	1946	Volusia County	Florida	Active	(Note: Chapter was chartered as Gamma Zeta Sigma and changed its name in 1960.)
Tallahassee Alumnae	Gamma Eta Sigma	October 3, 1946	Jefferson County, Leon County, Madison County, Taylor County, and Wakulla County	Florida	Active	(Note: Chapter was chartered as Gamma Eta Sigma. Its name was changed in August 1958.)
Knoxville Alumnae	Gamma Theta Sigma	March 1947	Knox County	Tennessee	Active	(Note: Chapter originally organized as Alpha Kappa Sigma First. In November 1938, it merged into Beta Omicron, a citywide chapter for collegiate and graduate members. In March 1947, it split into Gamma Theta Sigma for alumnae and Gamma Mu for the students at Knoxville College. Finally, the name changed to Knoxville Alumnae chapter in the 1950s.)
Newport News Alumnae	Gamma Iota Sigma	February 5, 1947	Newport News	Virginia	Active	(Note: This chapter was chartered as Gamma Iota Sigma and was originally part of Beta Kappa, a citywide chapter established in on October 26, 1937, for both graduates and undergraduate members. It became the Newport News Alumnae Chapter in 1960.)
Rocky Mount Alumnae	Gamma Kappa Sigma	April 4, 1947	Edgecombe County and Nash County	North Carolina	Active	
Greenville (SC) Alumnae	Gamma Lambda Sigma	April 9, 1947	Greenville County	South Carolina	Active	
Tampa Alumnae	Gamma Mu Sigma	April 9, 1947	Hillsborough County	Florida	Active	
Hartford Alumnae	Gamma Nu Sigma	May 14, 1947	Hartford County (excluding Bristol and Southington)	Connecticut	Active	
	Gamma Xi Sigma					
Annapolis Alumnae	Gamma Omicron Sigma	December 9, 1947	,Annapolis and Anne Arundel County	Maryland	Active	
Evanston-North Shore Alumnae	Gamma Omicron	January 20, 1948	Evanston, North Shore suburban, and North Side Chicago	Illinois	Active	(Note: Chapter started as Gamma Omicron, a citywide chapter that included both graduate and undergraduate members. The undergraduates formed Theta Alpha in 1971. It became the Evanston-North Shore Alumnae chapter on February 9, 1975.)
West Palm Beach Alumnae	Gamma Pi Sigma	February 17, 1948	Palm Beach County	Florida	Active	
Columbus (GA) Alumnae	Gamma Rho Sigma	February 14, 1948	Chattahoochee County, Fort Benning, Harris County, and Muscogee County	Georgia	Active	
	Gamma Sigma Sigma					
	Gamma Tau Sigma					
Grambling Alumnae	Gamma Upsilon Sigma	March 24, 1948	Arcadia, Farmerville, Gibsland, Grambling, Haynesville, Homer, Jonesboro, Monroe, Ruston, and Winnfield	Louisiana	Active	
San Francisco Alumnae	Gamma Phi Sigma	March 27, 1948	San Francisco	California	Active	
	Gamma Chi Sigma					
	Gamma Psi Sigma					
Wilmington (DE) Alumnae	Gamma Omega Sigma	March 6, 1949	New Castle and Wilmington	Delaware	Active	
Albany (GA) Alumnae	Gamma Phi	1949	Albany	Georgia	Active	(Note: Chapter was formed as Gamma Phi and changed its name to the Albany Alumnae chapter in 1960 and to the Albany (GA) Alumnae chapter in 1976.)
Pensacola Alumnae	Delta Alpha Sigma	April 20, 1949	Escambia County and Santa Rosa County	Florida	Active	
Houston Alumnae	Delta Beta Sigma	1946	Clear Lake City, Houston, and Greater Houston Area	Texas	Active	(Note: Chapter was formed by the alumnae members of Beta Beta, a citywide chapter established on January 27, 1927, for graduate and undergraduate members.)
Brooklyn Alumnae	Delta Gamma Sigma	March 14, 1949	Brooklyn	New York	Active	
Tuscaloosa Alumnae	Delta Delta Sigma	May 1950	Tuscaloosa County	Alabama	Active	
Little Rock Alumnae	Delta Epsilon Sigma	April 1950	Greater Little Rock and Little Rock	Arkansas	Active	(Note: Chapter formed as Delta Epsilon Sigma by the alumnae members of Gamma Gamma, established March 28, 1942, as a citywide chapter with graduate and undergraduate members. Its name changed to Little Rock Alumnae Chapter in 1956.)
	Delta Zeta Sigma					
	Delta Eta Sigma					
Queens Alumnae	Delta Theta Sigma	June 4, 1951	Queens	New York	Active	(Note: Chapter was chartered as Delta Theta Sigma. Its name changed to the Long Island Alumnae chapter in 1957. It was renamed the Queens Alumnae chapter in 1964.)
Hampton Alumnae	Delta Iota Sigma	October 27, 1951	Hampton, Newport News, and York County	Virginia	Active	(Note: Chapter formed from Gamma Iota Sigma, now Newport News Alumnae chapter.)
	Delta Kappa Sigma					
Youngstown Alumnae	Delta Lambda	May 19, 1951	Mahoning County and Trumbull County	Ohio	Active	(Note: This chapter started as Delta Lambda, a mixed graduate and undergraduate chapter. On May 19, 1975, after losing most of its collegiate members, it became the Youngstown Alumnae chapter.)
Martinsville Alumnae	Delta Lambda Sigma	November 27, 1951	Henry County and Martinsville	Virginia	Active	
Lawrenceville Alumnae	Delta Mu Sigma ?	December 3, 1951	Brunswick County, Greenville County, and Mecklenburg County	Virginia	Active	
Prairie View Alumnae	Delta Nu Sigma	October 1952	Brookshire, Hempstead, Prairie View, and Waller	Texas	Active	(Note: Chapter was chartered as Delta Nu Sigma. Its name was changed in 1958.)
Lubbock Alumnae	Delta Xi Sigma	November 15, 1952	Lubbock	Texas	Active	
Florence Alumnae	Delta Omicron Sigma	May 30, 1952	Darlington County and Florence County	South Carolina	Active	
Cambridge Alumnae	Delta Pi Sigma	April 18, 1952	Caroline County, Dorchester County, Kent County, Queen Anne's County, Talbot County, Wicomico County, and Worcester County	Maryland	Active	
Aiken Alumnae	Delta Rho Sigma	June 1952	Aiken County and Edgefield County	South Carolina	Active	
Trenton Alumnae	Delta Sigma	September 16, 1952	Mercer County	New Jersey	Active	
Salisbury Alumnae	Delta Tau Sigma	April 24, 1952	Iredell County, Rowan County, and Stanly County	North Carolina	Active	(Note: This chapter was chartered as Delta Tau Sigma. In 1956, its name was changed to the Salisbury Alumnae chapter.)
Selma Alumnae	Delta Uplison Sigma	November 13, 1953	Dallas County, Lowndes County, Montgomery, and Perry County	Alabama	Active	
	Delta Phi Sigma					
New Bern Alumnae	Delta Chi Sigma	February 28, 1953	Carteret County, Craven County, Jones County, and Pamlico County	North Carolina	Active	(Note: Chapter was originally called Delta Chi Sigma. Its name was changed in 1958.)
Gastonia Alumnae	Delta Psi Sigma	February 20, 1954	Cleveland County and Gaston County	North Carolina	Active	
	Delta Omega Sigma					
Fayetteville Alumnae	Epsilon Alpha Sigma	September 12, 1953	Cumberland County	North Carolina	Active	(Note: Chapter was charted as Epsilon Alpha Sigma and changed its name in 1960.)
Elizabeth City Alumnae	Epsilon Beta Sigma	December 12, 1953	Elizabeth City	North Carolina	Active	
Orlando Alumnae	Epsilon Gamma Sigma	February 20, 1954	Orange County	Florida	Active	
Huntsville (AL) Alumnae	Epsilon Delta Sigma	April 24, 1954	Brownsboro, Gurley, Hampton Cove, Harvest, Hazel Green, Huntsville, Madison, Meridianville, Monrovia, Moores Mill, New Hope, New Market, Owens Cross Roads, Redstone Arsenal, Toney, and Triana	Alabama	Active	
Flint Alumnae	Epsilon Epsilon Sigma	May 16, 1954	Genesee County and northern Oakland County	Michigan	Active	
	Epsilon Zeta Sigma					
Lake Charles Alumnae	Epsilon Eta Sigma	January 29, 1955	Cameron, DeQuincy, Iowa, Jennings, Lake Charles, Sulphur, Vinton, and Westlake	Louisiana	Active	(Note: Chapter was chartered as Epsilon Eta Sigma. Its name was changed in 1958.)
Dover Alumnae	Epsilon Theta Sigma ?	April 1955	Clayton, Kent County, and Smyrna	Delaware	Active	
Monroe Alumnae	Epsilon Iota Sigma	1955	Morehouse Parish, Ouachita Parish, and Richland Parish	Louisiana	Active	
	Epsilon Kappa Sigma					
Asheville Alumnae	Epsilon Lambda Sigma	May 14, 1955	Asheville	North Carolina	Active	(Note: Chapter was formed as Epsilon Lambda Sigma chapter and was later renamed.)
South Bend Alumnae	Epsilon Mu Sigma	December 3, 1955	Elkhart County and St. Joseph County	Indiana	Active	
Broward County Alumnae	Epsilon Nu Sigma	December 10, 1955	Broward County and Palm Beach County	Florida	Active	(Note: Chapter was originally called Epsilon Nu Sigma.)
Baton Rouge Sigma Alumnae	Epsilon Xi Sigma	October 10, 1956	East Baton Rouge Parish	Louisiana	Active	(Note: Chapter was formed as Epsilon Xi Sigma but later had a name change.)
Wilson Alumnae	Epsilon Omicron Sigma	April 6, 1957	Wilson County	North Carolina	Active	
Harrisburg Alumnae	Epsilon Pi Sigma	February 1, 1958	Harrisburg and Greater Harrisburg	Pennsylvania	Active	
Rock Hill Alumnae	Epsilon Rho Sigma	March 1, 1958	Rock Hill	South Carolina	Active	
Macon Alumnae	Epsilon Sigma Sigma	April 26, 1958	Bibb County, Jones County, Macon County, Monroe County, Twiggs County, and Wilkinson County	Georgia	Active	
Brunswick Alumnae		November 8, 1958	Brunswick, Camden County, Charlton County, and McIntosh County	Georgia	Active	
San Bernardino-Riverside Area Alumnae		December 6, 1959	Riverside County and San Bernardino County	California	Active	(Note: This chapter was originally called San Bernardino Alumnae.)
Chicago Alumnae	Theta Sigma	1959	Chicago, Evergreen Park, and Oak Lawn	Illinois	Active	(Note: Formed by the merger of two graduate chapters: Theta Sigma, established in 1924, and Gamma Chi Sigma, established in 1947. The former formed from Lambda, a citywide chapter of collegiate and graduate members established in 1921.)
Westchester Alumnae		1959	Westchester County and Wichita Falls	New York	Active	
Kinston Alumnae		February 28, 1959	Greene County and Lenoir County	North Carolina	Active	
Northern Virginia Alumnae		May 17, 1959	Alexandria, Arlington County, Fairfax, and Falls Church	Virginia	Active	
Alaska Alumnae		June 24, 1959	Anchorage	Alaska	Active	
New Haven Alumnae		October 3, 1959	New Haven County	Connecticut	Active	
Inkster Alumnae		December 19, 1959	Wayne County	Michigan	Active	
Greenville (NC) Alumnae		1960	Pitt County	North Carolina	Active	
Alcorn Alumnae		February 1960	Claiborne County, Jefferson County, and Natchez	Mississippi	Active	
Akron Alumnae		March 4, 1960	Medina County, Portage County, and Summit County	Ohio	Active	
Lansing Alumnae		March 20, 1960	Dewitt, East Lansing, Grand Ledge, Haslett, Holt, Jackson, Lansing, Mason, Okemos, and Williamston	Michigan	Active	
Fort Pierce Alumnae		September 19, 1960	Fort Pierce, Indian River County, Martin County, and St. Lucie County	Florida	Active	
Pasadena Alumnae		January 27, 1961	Altadena and Pasadena	California	Active	
Ocala Alumnae		February 19, 1961	Gainesville, Leesburg, Marion County, Ocala, and Wildwood	Florida	Active	
Saint Petersburg Alumnae		February 19, 1961	Pasadena and south Pinellas County	Florida	Active	
La Marque Alumnae		June 8, 1961	Dickinson, Kemah, La Marque, League City, Santa Fe, and Texas City	Texas	Active	
Spartanburg Alumnae		November 18, 1961	Cherokee County, Spartanburg, and Union	South Carolina	Active	
Lafayette Alumnae		February 24, 1962	Lafayette Parish, upper St. Martin Parish, and Vermillion Parish (excluding Cade, Parks, and St. Martinville)	Louisiana	Active	
Amarillo Alumnae		April 29, 1962	Amarillo	Texas	Active	
Montclair Alumnae		May 6, 1962	Essex County	New Jersey	Active	
Ann Arbor Alumnae		November 17, 1962	Washtenaw County and Whitmore Lake	Michigan	Active	
Nassau Alumnae		April 20, 1963	Nassau County	New York	Active	
Greenwood-Itta Bena Alumnae		December 14, 1963	Carroll County, Greenwood, Grenada, Indianola, Inverness, Itta Bena, and Moorhead	Mississippi	Active	
Odessa Alumnae		May 29, 1964	Big Spring, Crane, Lamesa, Midland, Odessa, Pecos, Seminole, and Sweetwater	Texas	Active	
Anniston Alumnae		May 30, 1965	Calhoun County, Cleburne County, and St. Clair County	Alabama	Active	
Rochester Alumnae		October 9, 1965	Monroe County	New York	Active	
Fort Myers Alumnae		December 18, 1965	Charlotte County, Hendry County, and Lee County	Florida	Active	
Rome Alumnae		January 15, 1966	Bartow County, Chattooga County, Cherokee County, Floyd County, Gordon County, Polk County, and Whitfield County	Georgia	Active	
Minneapolis-St Paul Alumnae		March 12, 1966	Anoka County, Carver County, Dakota County, Hennepin County, Minneapolis–Saint Paul, Ramsey County, Scott County, and Washington County	Minnesota	Active	
Muscle Shoals Area Alumnae		March 12, 1966	Colbert County and Lauderdale County	Alabama	Active	
Las Vegas Alumnae		June 3, 1966	Clark County and Las Vegas	Nevada	Active	
Los Angeles South Bay Alumnae		August 28, 1966	Los Angeles County	California	Active	
Laurel Alumnae		November 12, 1966	Hattiesburg and Jones County	Mississippi	Active	(Note: Chapter was originally called the Laurel-Hattiesburg Alumnae. Its name changed in 2004.)
Valdosta Alumnae		February 18, 1967	Berrien County, Brooks County, Cook County, Lanier County, and Lowndes County	Georgia	Active	
Albuquerque Alumnae		March 18, 1967	Albuquerque	New Mexico	Active	
Wichita Alumnae	Alpha Phi	May 11, 1967	Pratt County and Sedgwick County	Kansas	Active	(Note: This chapter formed from Alpha Phi, a citywide chapter established on March 9, 1935, that included both graduate and undergraduate members.)
Helena Alumnae		June 2, 1967	Barton, Elaine, Helena-West Helena, Lake View, Lexa, Marvell, and West Helena	Arkansas	Active	
Albany (NY) Alumnae		June 17, 1967	Albany, Rome, Saratoga, Schenectady, Troy, and Utica	New York	Active	
Monmouth County Alumnae		June 24, 1967	Monmouth County and Ocean County	New Jersey	Active	
Tucson Alumnae		June 24, 1967	Sierra Vista and Tucson	Arizona	Active	
Benton Harbor-St Joseph Alumnae		October 21, 1967	Berrien County and Van Buren County	Michigan	Active	
Saginaw Alumnae		October 28, 1967	Bay County and Saginaw County	Michigan	Active	
Brevard County Alumnae		February 10, 1968	Brevard County	Florida	Active	
Bronx Alumnae		February 18, 1968	Bronx	New York	Active	
Lancaster (SC) Alumnae		April 20, 1968	Lancaster County	South Carolina	Active	
Greenwood Alumnae		May 25, 1968	Abbeville County, Greenwood County, McCormick County, and Saluda County	South Carolina	Active	
Grand Rapids Alumnae		November 17, 1968	Kent County and Ottawa County	Michigan	Active	
Georgetown Alumnae		June 4, 1969	Georgetown County	South Carolina	Active	
Charlottesville Alumnae		June 9, 1969	Albemarle County, Augusta County, Charlottesville, Fluvanna County, Louisa County, and Rockingham County	Virginia	Active	
Kansas City (MO) Alumnae		June 13, 1969	Blue Springs, Grandview, Independence, Lee's Summit, Kansas City, North Kansas City, and Raytown	Missouri	Active	(Note: Chapter was established by the graduate members of Alpha Alpha, established in 1926 to serve both graduate and undergraduate members.)
South Jersey Alumnae		June 29, 1969	Bellmawr, Camden County, Cumberland County, Gloucester County, and Salem County	New Jersey	Active	
Denver Alumnae		1969	Denver and Denver Metropolitan Area	Colorado	Active	(Note: Chapter formed by the alumnae members of Beta Phi, a citywide chapter established on February 18, 1939, for both undergraduate and graduate members.)
Nacogdoches Alumnae		September 13, 1969	Nacogdoches	Texas	Active	
Kansas City (KS) Alumnae		November 2, 1969	Bonner Springs, Johnson County, Kansas City, and Lawrence	Kansas	Active	
Federal City Alumnae		December 6, 1969	Washington	District of Columbia	Active	
Fort Worth Alumnae		1969	Tarrant County	Texas	Active	(Note: Chapter formed from Beta Rho, a mixed chapter formed in 1938 that included both graduate and undergraduate members.)
Galveston Alumnae		1969	Dickinson, Galveston, Galveston Island, Hitchcock, Kemah, League City, and Santa Fe	Texas	Active	(Note: Chapter was formed by the graduate members of Gamma Delta, a mixed chapter of graduate and undergraduate members formed in 1941.)
Columbus Metropolitan Alumnae		February 2, 1970	Chattahoochee County, Fort Benning, Harris County, and Muscogee County	Georgia	Active	(Note: This was chartered as the Harris County Alumnae chapter. Its name was changed on December 4, 1979, to better reflected its service area.)
Montgomery County (MD) Alumnae		March 7, 1970	Montgomery County	Maryland	Active	
Paducah Alumnae		May 23, 1970	Calloway County, Fulton County, Graves County, Hickman County, and McCracken County	Kentucky	Active	
Mid-Hudson Valley Alumnae		June 27, 1970	Dutchess County, Kingston, Newburgh, Orange, Putnam, and Ulster	New York	Active	
Providence Alumnae		October 31, 1970	Bristol County, Kent County, Newport County, Providence County, and Washington County	Rhode Island	Active	
San Jose Alumnae		November 8, 1970	Milpitas, Mountain View, Palo Alto, San Jose, Santa Clara, and Santa Cruz	California	Active	
Pittsburgh Alumnae	Alpha Epsilon	January 1971	Allegheny County, Armstrong County, Beaver County, Butler County, Fayette County, Greene County, Indiana County, Lawrence County, Somerset County, and Washington County	Pennsylvania	Active	(Note: Chapter formed by the alumnae members of Alpha Epsilon, a citywide chapter that included both graduate and undergraduate members.)
Fort Wayne Alumnae		June 19, 1971	Fort Wayne	Indiana	Active	
Toledo Alumnae		February 12, 1972	Lucas County and Wood County	Ohio	Active	(Note: This was started by the alumnae members of Beta Lambda, a citywide chapter chartered in 1937 for both graduate and collegiate members.)
New Iberia Alumnae		April 24, 1972	Avery Island, Cade, Loreauville, New Iberia, and St. Martinville	Louisiana	Active	
Tacoma Alumnae		April 30, 1972	Tacoma	Washington	Active	
Phoenix Metropolitan Alumnae	Beta Theta	May 11, 1972	Greater Phoenix Metro Area and Maricopa County	Arizona	Active	(Note: Chapter formed from Beta Theta, a citywide chapter that included collegiate and graduate members.)
Syracuse Alumnae		May 17, 1972	Bridgeport, Cazenovia, Jefferson County, and Onondaga County	New York	Active	
Longview Alumnae		July 29, 1972	Longview	Texas	Active	
El Paso Alumnae		September 30, 1972	El Paso and Las Cruces	Texas	Active	(Note: Chapter formed from Bete Omega, a citywide chapter established on March 6, 1945, for both collegiate and graduate members.)
Sacramento Alumnae		1973	El Dorado County, Placer County, Sacramento County, and Yolo County	California	Active	(Note: The chapter formed from Delta Theta, a chapter for both graduate and undergraduate members that were chartered on October 14, 1950.)
Ahoskie Alumnae		June 2, 1973	Ahoskie	North Carolina	Active	
Tempe Alumnae		June 9, 1973	Maricopa County	Arizona	Active	
Kalamazoo Alumnae		June 23, 1973	Greater Kalamazoo Area and Kalamazoo	Michigan	Active	
Nashville Metropolitan Alumnae		June 28, 1973	Cheatham County, Davidson County, Maury County, Robertson County, Sumner County, Williamson County, and Wilson County	Tennessee	Active	
Decatur (GA) Alumnae		October 5, 1973	DeKalb County, East Atlanta, and Ellenwood	Georgia	Active	
Athens Alumnae		October 19, 1973	Banks County, Barrow County, Clarke County, Elbert County, Greene County, Jackson County, Madison County, Oglethorpe, Oconee, and Walton County	Georgia	Active	
Dyersburg Alumnae		November 1973	Dyer County, Gibson County, Lake County, Lauderdale County, Obion County, and Tipton County	Tennessee	Active	
Champaign-Urbana Alumnae		December 15, 1973	Champaign County and Vermillion County	Illinois	Active	
Joliet Area/South Suburban Alumnae		January 12, 1974	Cook County, Frankfort Heights, Joliet, and Will County	Illinois	Active	
Killeen Alumnae		February 15, 1974	Copperas Cove, Fort Cavazos, Harker Heights, and Killeen	Texas	Active	
Prince George's County Alumnae		March 31, 1974	Prince George's County	Maryland	Active	
Vallejo Alumnae		1974	Vallejo	California	Active	
Gary Alumnae		1975	Lake County, LaPorte County, and Porter County	Indiana	Active	(Note: Formed from the mixed Beta Nu chapter, established in 1938.)
Houston Metropolitan Alumnae		November 9, 1974	Clear Lake and Houston	Texas	Active	
Lincoln Alumnae		November 23, 1974	Lincoln	Nebraska	Active	
Hammond (LA) Area Alumnae		1975	Amite City, Hammond, Independence, and Kentwood	Louisiana	Active	
Saint Croix Alumnae		January 25, 1975	Christiansted, Frederiksted, and Saint Croix	U.S. Virgin Islands	Active	
Enfield-Roanoke Rapids Alumnae		February 15, 1975	Halifax County, Northampton County, and Rocky Mount	North Carolina	Active	
Peoria Alumnae		April 19, 1975	Greater Peoria and Peoria	Illinois	Active	
United Kingdom Alumnae		May 9, 1975	England, Northern Ireland, Scotland, and Wales		Active	
Huntsville (TX) Alumnae		May 17, 1975 – 19xx ?; November 15, 1997	Conroe, Huntsville, New Waverly, and The Woodlands	Texas	Active	
Crowley Alumnae		June 1, 1975	Crowley	Louisiana	Active	
Bakersfield Alumnae		July 26, 1975	Kern County	California	Active	
Central Jersey Alumnae		November 8, 1975	Middlesex County, Somerset County, and Union County	New Jersey	Active	
Lancaster (PA) Alumnae		November 23, 1975	East Nottingham Township, Lancaster County, and Oxford	Pennsylvania	Active	(Note: This was originally called the Lancaster-York Alumnae chapter. It was name changed in the mid-1980s.)
Kingstree-Lake City Alumnae		November 28, 1975	Lake City and Williamsburg County	South Carolina	Active	
Springfield-Decatur Area Alumnae		January 10, 1976	Decatur and Springfield	Illinois	Active	
Greater Cleveland Alumnae		1976	Beachwood and Greater Cleveland	Ohio	Active	
Bergen County Alumnae		April 10, 1976	Bergen County	New Jersey	Active	
Stockton Alumnae		April 24, 1976	Lodi, Modesto north of Carpenter, Ripon, Salida, and Stockton	California	Active	
Berkeley County Alumnae		May 22, 1976	Berkeley County and North Charleston	South Carolina	Active	
Conway Alumnae		June 1976	Conway and Myrtle Beach	South Carolina	Active	
Blytheville Alumnae		June 1976	Mississippi County	Arkansas	Active	
Beaufort Alumnae		June 19, 1976	Beaufort County and Jasper County	South Carolina	Active	
Rancocas Valley Alumnae		September 12, 1976	Burlington County	New Jersey	Active	
Quaker City Alumnae		October 17, 1976	Philadelphia	Pennsylvania	Active	
Monterey Peninsula Alumnae		November 3, 1976	Carmel-by-the-Sea, Ford Ora, Marina, Monterey, Pacific Grove, Salinas, and Seaside	California	Active	
Vicksburg Alumnae		November 6, 1976	Warren County	Mississippi	Active	
Pontiac Alumnae		November 30, 1976	Bloomfield Township and Oakland County	Michigan	Active	
Muskegon Heights Alumnae		December 12, 1976	Muskegon County	Michigan	Active	
Gadsden Alumnae		December 20, 1976	Etowah County	Alabama	Active	
Glen Ellyn Area Alumnae		January 23, 1977	Cook County, Darien, DuPage County, Kane County, Oswego, and Plainfield	Illinois	Active	
Glades Alumnae		January 29, 1977	Clewiston and Palm Beach County	Florida	Active	
Opelousas Alumnae		February 25, 1977	Evangeline Parish, Opelousas, St. Landry Parish, and Washington Parish	Louisiana	Active	
Clearwater Alumnae		April 2, 1977	Mid-Pinellas County and north and west Pasco County	Florida	Active	
Lakeland Alumnae		April 2, 1977	Polk County	Florida	Active	
Talladega County Alumnae		May 10, 1977	Childersburg, Lincoln, Munford, Sycamore, Sylacauga, and Talladega	Alabama	Active	
Leesburg Alumnae		July 9, 1977	Lake County and Sumter County	Florida	Active	
Bay City Alumnae		July 23, 1977	Brazoria County, Calhoun County, Colorado County, Jackson County, Matagorda County, Victoria County, and Wharton County	Texas	Active	
Madison Alumnae		August 27, 1977	Dane County	Wisconsin	Active	
Indianapolis Alumnae		September 29, 1977	Avon, Brownsburg, Carmel, Greenwood, Fishers, Indianapolis, Kokomo, Lafayette, Noblesville, West Lafayette, and Zionsville	Indiana	Active	(Note: This chapter originated as part of Chi, a citywide chapter chartered in 1925 that include both graduate and collegiate members. In 1977, Chi restructured as the Indianapolis Alumnae chapter.)
Anderson-Muncie Alumnae		October 29, 1977	Anderson, Marion, Muncie, and Richmond	Indiana	Active	
Mississippi Golden Triangle Alumnae		November 12, 1977	Starkville and West Point	Mississippi	Active	
Natchez Alumnae		November 19, 1977	Adams County	Mississippi	Active	
Greene County Alumnae		1978	Greene County and Hale County	Alabama	Active	
Corpus Christi Alumnae		February 11, 1978	Aransas County, Kleberg County, Nueces County, and San Patricio County	Texas	Active	
Chesapeake-Virginia Beach Alumnae		March 9, 1978	Chesapeake and Virginia Beach	Virginia	Active	
Orange County (CA) Alumnae		April 29, 1978	Orange County	California	Active	
Evansville Alumnae		April 22, 1978	Daviess County, Gibson County, Posey County, Spencer County, Vanderburgh County, and Warrick County	Indiana	Active	
Bloomington Alumnae		May 13, 1978 – xxxx ?; February 9, 2002	Bartholomew County, Monroe County, and Terre Haute	Indiana	Active	
Anderson (SC) Alumnae		May 19, 1978	Anderson	South Carolina	Active	
San Fernando Valley Alumnae		May 20, 1978	Granada Hills, San Fernando Valley, and Santa Clarita Valley	California	Active	
Bradenton Alumnae		August 19, 1978	Brevard County, Manatee County, and Sarasota County	Florida	Active	
Augusta Alumnae		August 29, 1978	Augusta, Burke County, and Richmond County	Georgia	Active	
Carbondale Alumnae		September 1978	Carbondale and Southern Illinois	Illinois	Active	
Clarksville Alumnae		October 21, 1978	Clarksville and Fort Campbell	Tennessee	Active	
Paterson Alumnae		November 12, 1978	Paterson	New Jersey	Active	
Auburn Alumnae		November 12, 1978	Chambers County, Lee County, Russell County, and Tallapoosa County	Alabama	Active	
Buffalo Alumnae		1979	Buffalo and Erie County	New York	Active	(Note: The chapter was formed by splitting off from Gamma Kappa, a citywide chapter formed in 1949 that originally included both graduate and undergraduate members.)
Nassau Bahamas Alumnae		1979	Nassau	The Bahamas	Active	
Hartsville Alumnae		1979	Darlington, Hartsville, Lamar, and Society Hill	South Carolina	Active	
Pomona Valley Alumnae		January 21, 1979	east Los Angeles County, northwest Riverside County, and southwest San Bernardino County	California	Active	
Erie Alumnae		January 27, 1979	Erie County	Pennsylvania	Active	
San Francisco-Peninsula Alumnae		February 10, 1979	Bay Area, San Francisco, and San Mateo	California	Active	
Marianna Area Alumnae		February 17, 1979	Marianna, Phillip County, St. Francis County, and White County	Arkansas	Active	
Laurinburg Alumnae		February 24, 1979	Moore County, Robeson County, Richmond County, and Scotland County	North Carolina	Active	
Holly Springs-Marshall County Alumnae		March 10, 1979	Benton County and Marshall County	Mississippi	Active	
Chapel Hill-Carrboro Area Alumnae		March 18, 1979	Orange County and Northern Chatham County	North Carolina	Active	
Bolivar County Alumnae		March 31, 1979	Bolivar County and North Sunflower County	Mississippi	Active	
Princess Anne Alumnae		May 5, 1979	Lower Eastern Shore of Maryland, Somerset County, Wicomico County, and Worcester County	Maryland	Active	
Hopkinsville Alumnae		May 20, 1979	Caldwell County, Christian County, Crittenden County, Hopkins County, Livingston County, Lyon County, Muhlenberg County, Todd County, and Trigg County	Kentucky	Active	
Harford County Alumnae		June 10, 1979	Cecil County and Harford County	Maryland	Active	
Oakland East Bay Alumnae		June 30, 1979	East Bay Area and Oakland	California	Active	
Geary-Riley-Saline Alumnae		July 9, 1979	Geary County, Riley County, and Saline County	Kansas	Active	
Thomasville Alumnae		July 28, 1979	Thomasville	Georgia	Active	
Germany Alumnae		1979	Frankfurt and western Germany	Germany	Active	
Atlantic City Alumnae		July 28, 1979	Atlantic County and Cape May County	New Jersey	Active	
Seattle Alumnae		September 9, 1979	King County	Washington	Active	(Note: Chapter formed from Alpha Omicron, a citywide chapter established on April 17, 1933, for both graduate and undergraduate chapters.)
Waukegan Alumnae		November 3, 1979	Lake County	Illinois	Active	
East Point/College Park Alumnae		December 1, 1979	Clayton County, Fayette County, and south Fulton County	Georgia	Active	
Fairfield County Alumnae		December 1, 1979	Fairfield County	Connecticut	Active	
Greenville (MS) Alumnae		1980	Washington County	Mississippi	Active	
Battle Creek Alumnae		January 12, 1980	Calhoun County and Eaton County	Michigan	Active	
Ithaca Alumnae		February 2, 1980	Chemung County, Steuben County, and Tompkins County	New York	Active	
San Joaquin Valley Alumnae		June 19, 1980	Fresno and San Joaquin Valley	California	Active	
Denmark Alumnae		June 20, 1980	Bamberg County	South Carolina	Active	
Washington-Plymouth Alumnae		June 29, 1980	Beaufort County, Martin County, and Washington County	North Carolina	Active	
Fredericksburg Area Alumnae		August 16, 1980	Caroline County, Fredericksburg, King George County, Spotsylvania County, and Stafford County	Virginia	Active	
Walterboro Alumnae		September 6, 1980	Allendale County, Colleton County, and Hampton County	South Carolina	Active	
Ventura County Alumnae		October 25, 1980	Ventura County	California	Active	
North Manhattan Alumnae		December 13, 1980	Fort George, Inwood, North Harlem, North Manhattan, and Washington Heights	New York	Active	
Blacksburg Alumnae		1981	Blacksburg, Giles County, Montgomery County, Pulaski County, and Radford	Virginia	Active	
Dade County Alumnae		January 10, 1981	Miami-Dade County and Miami	Florida	Active	
South Middlesex County Alumnae		January 10, 1981	south Middlesex County and Worcester	Massachusetts	Active	
Roxboro Alumnae		March 28, 1981	Roxboro	North Carolina	Active	
Century City Alumnae		March 22, 1981	Los Angeles and Western Los Angeles	California	Active	
Omaha Alumnae		July 1, 1981	Douglas, Omaha, Omaha Metro Area, Sarpy County, and Washington County	Nebraska	Active	(Note: Chapter formed from Gamma Xi, established on November 24, 1947, for both graduate and undergraduate members.)
Fort Knox Alumnae		June 28, 1981	Fort Knox, Hardin County, and Meade County	Kentucky	Active	
Des Moines Alumnae		July 1, 1981	Des Moines and Greater Des Moines	Iowa	Active	(Note: This was formed by the alumane members of Phi chapter, a citywide chapter formed in 1923, that included both graduate and undergraduate members.)
Williamsburg Alumnae		December 5, 1981	Gloucester County, James City County, York County, Mathews County, and Williamsburg	Virginia	Active	
Springfield Alumnae		December 5, 1981	Springfield	Massachusetts	Active	
Portland Alumnae		1981	Portland, Portland Metro, and Vancouver	Oregon	Active	(Note: This chapter was formed by the graduate members of Beta Psi, established on Marcy 24, 1945, for both graduate and undergraduate chapters.)
Chester (SC) Alumnae		February 27, 1982	Chester County	South Carolina	Active	
Camden Alumnae		February 28, 1982	Fairfield County (portion) and Kershaw County	South Carolina	Active	
Bloomington-Normal Alumnae		March 27, 1983	Bloomitngton and Normal	Illinois	Active	
Okaloosa County Alumnae		March 20, 1982	Holly, Navarre, Okaloosa County, and Walton County	Florida	Active	
Virginia Beach Alumnae		April 18, 1982	Blackwater, Chesapeake, Norfolk, Pungo, and Virginia Beach	Virginia	Active	
Laurens Alumnae		May 1, 1982	Clinton and Laurens	South Carolina	Active	
Hickory Alumnae		May 15, 1982	Burke County, Caldwell County, Catawba County, and Iredell County	North Carolina	Active	
Apalachin Alumnae		May 22, 1982	Broome County, Delaware, and Tioga	New York	Active	
Farmville Alumnae		May 23, 1982	Amelia County, Buckingham County, Charlotte County, Cumberland County, Nottoway County, and Prince Edward County	Virginia	Active	
Oak Ridge Alumnae		May 29, 1982	Anderson County, Hardin Valley, Loudon, McMinn County, Monroe, Morgan County, Roane County, and Solway	Tennessee	Active	
Davenport Alumnae		1983	Bettendorf and Davenport	Iowa	Active	
Shelby Alumnae		March 6, 1983	southeast Shelby County	Tennessee	Active	
Hawaii Alumnae		April 30, 1983	Honolulu and Oahu	Hawaii	Active	
Lancaster (CA) Alumnae		May 15, 1983	Antelope Valley, Lancaster, and Palmdale	California	Active	
Meridian Alumnae		May 21, 1983	Lauderdale County	Mississippi	Active	
Orange County (FL) Alumnae		May 28, 1983	Orange County, and Osceola County	Florida	Active	
Dothan Alumnae		June 18, 1983	Coffee County, Dale County, Geneva County, Henry County, Houston County, and Wiregrass	Alabama	Active	
Huntington Alumnae		October 2, 1983	Ashland, Huntington, and Ironton	West Virginia	Active	
Lorain County Alumnae		December 10, 1983	Erie County and Lorain County	Ohio	Active	
Bennettsville-Cheraw Alumnae		December 17, 1983	Cheraw and Marlboro County	South Carolina	Active	
York Alumnae		January 19, 1984	York	Pennsylvania	Active	
North Charleston Alumnae		May 10, 1984	North Charleston	South Carolina	Active	
Atwater-Merced Alumnae		May 19, 1984	Atwater and Merced	California	Active	
Tupelo Alumnae		February 18, 1984	Lee County	Mississippi	Active	
South Palm Beach County Alumnae		March 9, 1984	Palm Beach County	Florida	Active	
Moss Point Alumnae		April 28, 1984	Jackson County	Mississippi	Active	
Sanford Alumnae		May 4, 1984	Seminole County	Florida	Active	
Southfield Alumnae		November 17, 1984	Oakland County	Michigan	Active	
Rockford Alumnae		November 18, 1984	Freeport and Winnebago County	Illinois	Active	
Prince William County Alumnae		December 1, 1984	Fredericksburg, Manassas, Manassas Park, and Prince Williams County	Virginia	Active	
Baltimore County Alumnae		December 15, 1984	Baltimore and Baltimore County	Maryland	Active	
Midland (MI) Alumnae		1984	Midland County	Michigan	Active	
Rockland County Alumnae		1985	Rockland County	New York	Active	
Iowa City-Cedar Rapids Alumnae		January 25, 1985	Cedar Rapids and Iowa City	Iowa	Active	
Lexington (NC) Alumnae		April 26, 1985	Davidson County	North Carolina	Active	
Potomac Valley Alumnae		April 27, 1985	southwestern and western Montgomery County	Maryland	Active	
Rutherford County Alumnae		May 4, 1985	Rutherford County	Tennessee	Active	
Griffin Area Alumnae		May 26, 1985	Butts County, Lamar County, Pike County, Spalding County, and Upson County	Georgia	Active	
Metropolitan Dallas Alumnae		August 8, 1985	Dallas and Dallas Metro Area	Texas	Active	
Gainesville Alumnae		October 26, 1985	Alachua County and Columbia County	Florida	Active	
Franklin Tri-County Alumnae		December 7, 1985	Franklin, Isle of Wright County, Southampton County, Surry County, and Sussex County	Virginia	Active	
Montgomery County (OH) Alumnae		December 14, 1985	Montgomery County	Ohio	Active	
Monroe Metropolitan Alumnae		January 18, 1986	Morehouse Parish, Ouachita Parish, and Richland Parish	Louisiana	Active	
Whiteville Alumnae		February 1, 1986	Bladen County and Columbus County	North Carolina	Active	
Marietta-Roswell Alumnae		February 22, 1986	Cherokee County, Cobb County, and north Fulton County	Georgia	Active	
Long Beach Alumnae		February 23, 1986	Long Beach and Los Angeles County	California	Active	
Hattiesburg Alumnae		April 19, 1986	Forrest County, Jefferson County, Jefferson Davis County, Lamar County, Marion County, and Perry County	Mississippi	Active	
Clay County Alumnae		April 26, 1986	Clay County and West Point	Mississippi	Active	
Forrest City Area Alumnae		April 26, 1986	Cross County, Monroe County, and St. Francis County	Arkansas	Active	
Brazos Valley Area Alumnae		August 9, 1986	Brazos County, Burleson County, Grimes County, Leon County, Madison County, Robertson County, and Washington County	Texas	Active	
Baltimore Metropolitan Alumnae		March 1, 1987	Baltimore	Maryland	Active	
Hot Springs Area Alumnae		March 21, 1987	Clark County, Garland County, and Hot Springs County	Arkansas	Active	
Morristown (NJ) Alumnae		March 27, 1987	Hunterdon County, Morris County, Sussex, and Warren Township	New Jersey	Active	
Hinesville Alumnae		May 24, 1987	Bryan County, Liberty County, Long County, and Wayne County	Georgia	Active	
Franklin-Jeanerette Alumnae		June 6, 1987	Jeanerette, Morgan City, and St. Mary Parish	Louisiana	Active	
Norfolk-Plymouth County Area Alumnae		June 14, 1987	Norfolk County, Plymouth County, and South Shore	Massachusetts	Active	
Troup-Coweta Alumnae		September 19, 1987	Coweta County and Troup County	Georgia	Active	(Note: This was chartered as LaGrange Alumnae chapter and was renamed in 2016 to reflect its new service area.)
Greater Salt Lake Alumnae		May 1, 1988	Murray, Ogden, and Salt Lake County	Utah	Active	
Republic of Korea Alumnae		May 14, 1988	Seoul and Yongsan military community	South Korea	Active	
Burlington Alumnae		May 28, 1988	Alamance County, Caswell County, Guilford County, and Rockingham County	North Carolina	Active	
Saint Thomas Alumnae		May 28, 1988	Charlotte Amalie and Saint Thomas	U.S. Virgin Islands	Active	
Stark County Alumnae		June 25, 1988	Stark County	Ohio	Active	
Arlington Alumnae		December 10, 1988	Arlington and Grand Prairie	Texas	Active	
Sussex County (DE) Alumnae		1988	Sussex County	Delaware	Active	
Bellevue Alumnae		1989	Bellevue, Bothell, Mercer Island, Mountlake Terrace, Renton, and Seattle East Side	Washington	Active	
Cincinnati Queen City Alumnae		January 28, 1989	Cincinnati, Greater Cincinnati, and Lincoln Heights	Ohio	Active	
Jacksonville (NC) Alumnae		February 5, 1989	Onlsow County	North Carolina	Active	
Warner Robins Alumnae		March 4, 1989	Bleckley County, Houston County, and Pulaski County	Georgia	Active	
Compton Alumnae		March 6, 1989	Compton	California	Active	
Oxford Alumnae		April 8, 1989	Lafayette County and Panola County	Mississippi	Active	
North Arundel County Alumnae		April 16, 1989	Anne Arundel County, Curtis Bay, Hanover, Jessup, and Laurel	Maryland	Active	
Leavenworth Alumnae		April 30, 1989	Fort Leavenworth, Kansas City, Lansing, Leavenworth, and Northland	Kansas	Active	
Melbourne-Palm Bay Alumnae		April 30, 1989	south Brevard County	Florida	Active	
New Jersey Garden City Alumnae		April 30, 1989	Camden County and Gloucester County	New Jersey	Active	
Kilgore Alumnae		May 27, 1989	Kilgore	Texas	Active	
Bermuda Alumnae		June 9, 1989	Bermuda	Bermuda	Active	
Natchitoches Alumnae		February 20, 1990	Natchitoches Parish and Vernon Parish	Louisiana	Active	
Contra Costa Alumnae		March 2, 1990	Contra Costa County	California	Active	
Hayward-Tri-City Alumnae		March 2, 1990	Fremont, Hayward, Newark, South Alameda, and Union City	California	Active	
Americus (GA) Alumnae		March 10, 1990	Americus	Georgia	Active	
Fort Washington Alumnae		April 28, 1990	Charles County and southern Prince George's County	Maryland	Active	
Waterloo Alumnae		1991	Cedar Falls, Cedar Valley, and Waterloo	Iowa	Active	
Valley Forge Alumnae		February 10, 1991	Bucks County, Montgomery County, and Valley Forge	Pennsylvania	Active	
Schaumburg/Hoffman Estates Alumnae		March 2, 1991	Cook County, DuPage County, Kane County, Lake County, and McHenry County	Illinois	Active	
Foothill Alumnae		March 16, 1991	Foothills Area and Los Angeles County	California	Active	
Allentown Alumnae		April 14, 1991	Berks County, Lehigh County, and Northampton County	Pennsylvania	Active	
Concord Alumnae		April 27, 1991	Cabarrus County and Kannapolis	North Carolina	Active	
Oklahoma Sooner City Alumnae		May 4, 1991	Oklahoma County and Oklahoma City metropolitan area	Oklahoma	Active	
Solano Valley Alumnae		May 5, 1991	Dixon, Fairfield, northern Solano County, Suisun City, Travis Air Force Base, and Vacaville	California	Active	
Lumberton Alumnae		May 5, 1991	Lumberton	North Carolina	Active	
Gadsden County (FL) Alumnae		May 17, 1991	Gadsden County	Florida	Active	
Okinawa Alumnae		June 2, 1991	Okinawa Island	Japan	Active	
DeLand Alumnae		May 30, 1992	West Volusia County	Florida	Active	
Inglewood Alumnae		April 16, 1993	Inglewood and Los Angeles	California	Active	
Atlanta Suburban Alumnae		April 24, 1993	Atlanta, Clayton County, and Fayette County	Georgia	Active	
Bowling Green Alumnae		May 15, 1993	Warren County	Kentucky	Active	
Fairfax County Alumnae		May 22, 1993	Fairfax County, Falls Church, and Loudoun County	Virginia	Active	
Chester (PA) Alumnae		January 22, 1994	Delaware County	Pennsylvania	Active	
Thomson Alumnae		March 12, 1994	Burke County, Columbia County, Crawfordville, Glascock County, Jefferson County, Lincolnton, McDuffie County, Richmond County, Sparta, Warren County, Washington County, and Wilkes County	Georgia	Active	
North Broward Alumnae		April 16, 1994	north Broward County and Palm Beach County	Florida	Active	
Richland County Alumnae		April 24, 1994	Columbia Metro Statistical Area, Fairfield County, Lexington, Newberry County, and Richland County	South Carolina	Active	
Milledgeville Alumnae		May 1, 1994	Baldwin County, Hancock County, and Putnam County	Georgia	Active	
Jefferson County Alumnae		May 7, 1994	Greater Birmingham, Jefferson County, and Shelby County	Alabama	Active	
Clinton (NC) Alumnae		January 22, 1995	Harnett County and Sampson County	North Carolina	Active	
Chesterfield Alumnae		March 11, 1995	Chester, Chesterfield, Chesterfield County, Ettrick, Matoaca, Midlothian, and Powhatan County	Virginia	Active	
Baker-Zachary Alumnae		March 12, 1995	Baker, East Feliciana Parish, West Feliciana Parish, and Zachery	Louisiana	Active	
Denton County Alumnae		March 25, 1995	Denton County	Texas	Active	
Pike County Alumnae		April 11, 1995	Amite County, Lawrence County, Lincoln County, Pike County, and Walthall County	Mississippi	Active	
Wichita Falls Alumnae		November 21, 1995	Wichita County	Texas	Active	
Palm Coast/Flagler County Alumnae		December 9, 1995	Flagler County, Putnam County, and St. John's County	Florida	Active	
Slidell Alumnae		1996	Picayune and Slidell	Louisiana	Active	
Staten Island Alumnae		January 20, 1996	Staten Island	New York	Active	
Mississippi Gulf Coast Alumnae		March 19, 1966	Hancock County, Harrison County, Mississippi Gulf Coast, and Stone County	Mississippi	Active	
North Dallas Suburban Alumnae		March 24, 1996	Addison, Carrollton, Dallas, Farmers Branch, Garland, Mesquite, Plano, and Richardson	Texas	Active	
Greater Morgantown Alumnae		April 27, 1996	Harrison County, Marion County, Monongalia County, Preston County, and Taylor County	West Virginia	Active	
Vidalia Alumnae		April 27, 1996	Concordia Parish	Louisiana	Active	
Dublin-Laurens Alumnae		May 4, 1996	Laurens County	Georgia	Active	
Knightdale-Wake Forest Alumnae		May 11, 1996	Jonesville, Wake Forest, eastern Wake County, and Youngsville	North Carolina	Active	
Panama City (FL) Alumnae		May 18, 1996	Panama City	Florida	Active	
Central Arkansas Alumnae		November 9, 1996	Conway County, Faulkner County, Lonoke County, Pulaski County, Saline County, and White County	Arkansas	Active	
Fort Bragg Area Alumnae		November 16, 1996	Fort Bragg, Hope Mills, Lillington, Raeford, and Spring Lake	North Carolina	Active	
Pitt County Alumnae		January 11, 1997	Pitt County	North Carolina	Active	
Yazoo City Alumnae		February 2, 1997	Humphrey's County and Yazoo County	Mississippi	Active	
Stone Mountain-Lithonia Alumnae		March 9, 1997	Centerville, Covington, Lilburn, Loganville, Monroe, Rockdale County, southeast DeKalb County, Snellville, and Winder	Georgia	Active	
Dillon-Marion County Alumnae		April 20, 1997	Dillon County and Marion County	South Carolina	Active	
Jonesboro Alumnae		June 28, 1997	Craighead County	Arkansas	Active	
Denbigh Alumnae		December 21, 1997	Carrollton, Denbigh, and York County	Virginia	Active	
Saint Louis Metropolitan Alumnae		January 11, 1998	St. Charles County, St. Louis, and St. Louis County	Missouri	Active	
Northwest Arkansas Area Alumnae		November 22, 1998	Bella Vista, Bentonville, Centerton, Lowell, Rogers, Springdale, and Washington County	Arkansas	Active	
Smithfield Alumnae		March 6, 1999	Isle of Wright County, Smithfield, and Surry County	Virginia	Active	
Central North Alabama Alumnae		April 9, 1999	Lawrence County, Limestone County, Madison County, and Morgan County	Alabama	Active	
Chesterfield County Alumnae		April 24, 1999	Chesterfield County	South Carolina	Active	
Cerritos Area Alumnae		May 1, 1999	Artesia, Bellflower, Cerritos, Downey, Hawaiian Gardens, La Mirada, Norwalk, Santa Fe Springs, and Whittier	California	Active	
Tokyo Alumnae		1999	Kanto Region	Japan	Active	
Merrimack Valley Alumnae		2000	Merrimack Valley, Nashua, and Newton Junction	New Hampshire	Active	
Bayou LaFourche Area Alumnae		January 30, 2000	Ascension Parish, Assumption Parish, Lafourche Parish, St. Charles Parish, St. James Parish, St. John the Baptist Parish, and Terrebonne Parish	Louisiana	Active	
Duplin County Alumnae		March 12, 2000	Duplin County	North Carolina	Active	
Henrico County Alumnae		March 26, 2000	Charles City County, Henrico County, New Kent County, and Richmond	Virginia	Active	
Rolling Hills/Palos Verdes Alumnae		January 14, 2001	southwest Los Angeles County	California	Active	
Hall County Alumnae		March 31, 2001	Forsyth County and Hall County	Georgia	Active	
Greater Waterbury Area Alumnae		April 29, 2001	Bristol, Litchfield County, Middlefield, Middletown, Naugatuck River Valley, Portland, Southington, and Waterbury	Connecticut	Active	
Statesboro Alumnae		April 13, 2002	Bulloch County, Candler County, and Evans County	Georgia	Active	
Brazosport Area Alumnae		April 14, 2002	Clute, Freeport, Lake Jackson, and Richwood	Texas	Active	
Louisiana Tri-Parish Alumnae		December 8, 2002	Iberville Parish, Pointe Coupee Parish, and West Baton Rouge Parish	Louisiana	Active	
Gwinnett County Alumnae		March 8, 2003	Gwinnett County, excluding Centerville, Lilburn, Loganville, and Snellville	Georgia	Active	
Tampa Metro Alumnae		April 21, 2003	East Pasco County and Hillsborough County	Florida	Active	
Johnston County Alumnae		April 27, 2003	Johnston County	North Carolina	Active	
Columbia Basin Alumnae		2003	Kennwick, Pasco, Richland, and Tri-Cities	Washington	Active	
Clinton (MS) Alumnae		March 29, 2004	Camden County, Charlton County, Clinton, and McIntosh County	Mississippi	Active	
Frederick County Alumnae		April 17, 2004	Frederick County	Maryland	Active	
Troy Alumnae		April 22, 2004	Barbour County, Bullock County, Crenshaw County, and Pike County	Alabama	Active	
Jamaica Alumnae		April 24, 2004	Kingston and St. Andrews Parish	Jamaica	Active	
Southwest Alabama Alumnae		April 29, 2004	Conecuh County and Monroeville	Alabama	Active	
Southwest Dallas County Alumnae		April 30, 2004	Cedar Hill, Dallas, and southwest Dallas County	Texas	Active	
Henry County Alumnae		December 4, 2004	Henry County	Georgia	Active	
Elk Grove Alumnae		December 11, 2004	Sacramento County and Yolo County	California	Active	
Bay Area Houston Alumnae		February 26, 2005	Clear Lake, Friendswood, Pasadena, Pearland, Seabrook, and Webster	Texas	Active	
North Harris County Alumnae		April 9, 2006	Cypress, Humble, Jersey Village, Kingwood, Spring, and Tomball	Texas	Active	
West Memphis Area Alumnae		April 22, 2005	Crittenden County	Arkansas	Active	
Tracy Area Alumnae		April 30, 2005	French Camp, Lathrop, Manteca, Mountain House, Patterson, Ripon, and Tracy	California	Active	
High Desert Alumnae		September 17, 2006	High Desert and San Bernardino County	California	Active	
East Kings County Alumnae		April 2007	Brooklyn	New York	Active	
Eastern Panhandle Alumnae		April 2007	Berkeley County and Jefferson County	West Virginia	Active	
Baldwin County Alumnae		April 5, 2007	Baldwin County and Escambia County	Alabama	Active	
Southeast Arkansas Alumnae		April 14, 2007	Ashley County, Bradley, Chicot County, Desha, Drew County, and Southeast Arkansas	Arkansas	Active	
Martin Alumnae		April 18, 2007	Obion County, Union City, and Weakley County	Tennessee	Active	
Douglas-Carroll-Paulding Counties Alumnae		April 22, 2007	Carroll County, Douglas County, and Paulding County	Georgia	Active	
Lake Oconee Area Alumnae		April 23, 2007	Greene County, Morgan County, and Taliaferro County	Georgia	Active	
Virginia Northern Neck Alumnae		April 29, 2007	Essex County, Lancaster County, Mathews County, Middlesex County, Northumberland County, Richmond County, Warsaw, and Westmoreland County	Virginia	Active	
Collin County Alumnae		March 30, 2008	Collin County, Prosper, Sachse, and Wylie	Texas	Active	
Madison County (MS) Alumnae		April 26, 2008	Camden, Canton, Farmhaven, Flora, Gluckstadt, Madison, Ridgeland, and Sharon	Mississippi	Active	
Sandhills Alumnae		April 8, 2009	Hoke County, Lee County, Montgomery County, and Moore County	North Carolina	Active	
South Broward Alumnae		April 17, 2009	Pembroke Pines	Florida	Active	
Grand Bahama Alumnae		April 18, 2009	Abaco, Bimini, Berry Islands, Freeport, and Grand Bahama	The Bahamas	Active	
Shelby County (TN) Alumnae		April 25, 2009	Shelby County	Tennessee	Active	
Loudoun County Alumnae		April 29, 2009	Loudoun County	Virginia	Active	
Union County Alumnae		January 28, 2011	Union County	North Carolina	Active	
Tri-County (MD) Alumnae		March 27, 2011	Calvert County, east Charles County, and St. Mary's County	Maryland	Active	
Western Wake Alumnae		April 26, 2011	Apex, Cary, Fuquay-Varina, Garner, Holly Springs, and Morrisville	North Carolina	Active	
Hilton Head Island-Bluffton Alumnae		February 26, 2012	Greater Bluffton Area, Hardeeville, Hilton Head Island, Okatie, and Pritchardville	South Carolina	Active	
River Parishes Alumnae		March 23, 2013	St. Charles Parish, St. James Parish, and St. John the Baptist Parish	Louisiana	Active	
North San Diego County Alumnae		April 20, 2013	Bonsall, Escondido, Fallbrook, Ramona, and Valley Center	California	Active	
Collier County Alumnae		October 26, 2013	Collier County	Florida	Active	
East Pocono Alumnae		November 23, 2013	Monroe County and Pike County	Pennsylvania	Active	
Fairbanks Alumnae		March 8, 2014	Fairbanks	Alaska	Active	
DeSoto County (MS) Alumnae		April 5, 2014	DeSoto County and Tate County	Mississippi	Active	
Covington Area Alumnae		April 12, 2014	Newton County and Walton County	Georgia	Active	
Greater Columbia County Alumnae		April 13, 2014	Columbia County and Lincoln County	Georgia	Active	
Middletown (DE) Alumnae		April 27, 2014	Clayton, Delaware City, Middleton, Odessa, Port Penn, Smyrna, St. Georges, and Townsend	Delaware	Active	
North Central Texas Alumnae		April 27, 2014	Plano	Texas	Active	
Ascension Alumnae		April 15, 2015	Ascension Parish	Louisiana	Active	
Northeast Wisconsin Alumnae		April 2, 2016	Green Bay	Wisconsin	Active	
Greater Toronto Area Alumnae		April 14, 2018	Durham, Halton, Hamilton, Ontario, Peel, Toronto, and York	Ontario, Canada	Active	
North Tangipahoa Area Alumnae		February 24, 2019	St. Helena Parish, St. Tammany Parish, and Tangipahoa Parish	Louisiana	Active	
East Harris Chambers Liberty County Alumnae		March 30, 2019	Chambers County, east Harris County, East Houston, and Liberty County	Texas	Active	
Inland Valley Alumnae		May 17, 2020	Beaumont, Chino, Chino Hills, Corona, Eastvale, Fontana, Hesperia, Highland, Jurupa Valley, Moreno Valley, Norco, Rancho Cucamonga, Redlands, and Rialto	California	Active	
Murrieta-Temecula Area Alumnae		May 17, 2020	Canyon Lake, Hemet, Lake Elsinore, Lake Matthews, Menifee, Murrieta, Perris, San Jacinto, Sun City, Temecula, Wildomar, and Winchester	California	Active	
Macomb Alumnae		May 23, 2020	Macomb County, and Shelby Township	Michigan	Active	
Chicago Metropolitan Alumnae		June 7, 2020	Chicago and Chicago Metro	Illinois	Active	
Katy Area Alumnae		June 14, 2020	Brookshire, Fulshear, Katy, Richmond, Sealy, and Simonton	Texas	Active	
Arabian Gulf Alumnae		October 31, 2020	Bahrain, Kuwait, Oman, Qatar, Saudi Arabia, United Arab Emirates		Active	
Southern Africa Alumnae		April 11, 2021	Angola, Botswana, Comoro Islands, Democratic Republic of the Congo, Eswatini, Kenya, Lesotho, Madagascar, Malawi, Mauritius, Mozambique, Namibia, Seychelles, South Africa, Tanzania, Zambia, and Zimbabwe		Active	
Arizona West Valley Alumnae		April 17, 2021	Maricopa County	Arizona	Active	
West Africa Alumnae		2021	Benin, Burkina Faso, Cape Verde, The Gambia, Ghana, Guinea, Guinea-Bissau, Ivory Coast, Lagos, Liberia, Mali, Niger, Nigeria, Senegal, Sierra Leone, and Togo		Active	
Waycross (GA) Alumnae		April 2022	Coffee County, Pierce County, Ware County	Georgia	Active	
Accomack-Northampton Alumnae			Accomak County and Northampton County	Virginia	Active	
Alexandria (LA) Alumnae			Rapides Parish	Louisiana	Active	
Ames Alumnae			Boone County, and Story County	Iowa	Active	
Bluefield Alumnae			McDowell County, Mercer County, Raleigh County, and Tazewell County	West Virginia	Active	
Boley Alumnae			Boley	Oklahoma	Active	
Clarksdale-Marks Alumnae			Coahoma County, Quitman County, Tallahatchie County, and Tunica County	Mississippi	Active	
Columbus/Lowndes County Alumnae			Lowndes County	Mississippi	Active	
Fort Smith Alumnae			Fayetteville, Fort Smith, and Ozark	Arkansas	Active	
Goldsboro Alumnae			Wayne County	North Carolina	Active	
Greenville-Manchester Area Alumnae			Coweta County, Meriwether County, Pike County, Talbot County, Troup County, and Upson County	Georgia	Active	
Lawton Alumnae			Altus, Anadarko, Chickasha, Duncan, Geary, Fort Sill, Lawton, Tatum, and Watonka	Oklahoma	Active	
Livingston Alumnae			Marengo County, and Sumter County	Alabama	Active	
Lufkin Area Alumnae			Burke, Diboll, Hudson, Huntington, and Lufkin	Texas	Active	
Magnolia Alumnae			Arkadelphia, Camden, Hope, Magnolia, and Prescott	Arkansas	Active	
Marianna Alumnae			Calhoun County, Jackson County, Liberty County, Holmes County, and Washington County	Florida	Active	
Marlin Alumnae			Chilton, Marlin, Reagan, and Satin	Texas	Active	
Midland (TX) Alumnae			Midland	Texas	Active	
Minden Alumnae			Arcadia, Athens, Cotton Valley, Cullen, Dixie Inn, Doyline, Dubberly, Gibsland, Haughton, Haynesville, Heflin, Homer, Minden, Ringgold, Sarepta, Shongaloo, Shreveport, Sibley, and Springhill	Louisiana	Active	
Orange (TX) Alumnae			Orange	Texas	Active	
Pickens County Alumnae			Aliceville, Carrollton, Gordo, Phoenix, and Reform	Alabama	Active	
Spokane Alumnae			Spokane	Washington	Active	
State College/Bellefonte Alumnae			Bellefonte and State College	Pennsylvania	Active	
Texarkana Alumnae			Texarkana, Arkansas and Texarkana, Texas	Texas	Active	

== See also ==
- List of Delta Sigma Theta collegiate chapters
- List of Delta Sigma Theta national conventions
- List of Delta Sigma Theta sisters
