= Brandon Williams (cornerback, born 1992) =

American football player (born 1992)

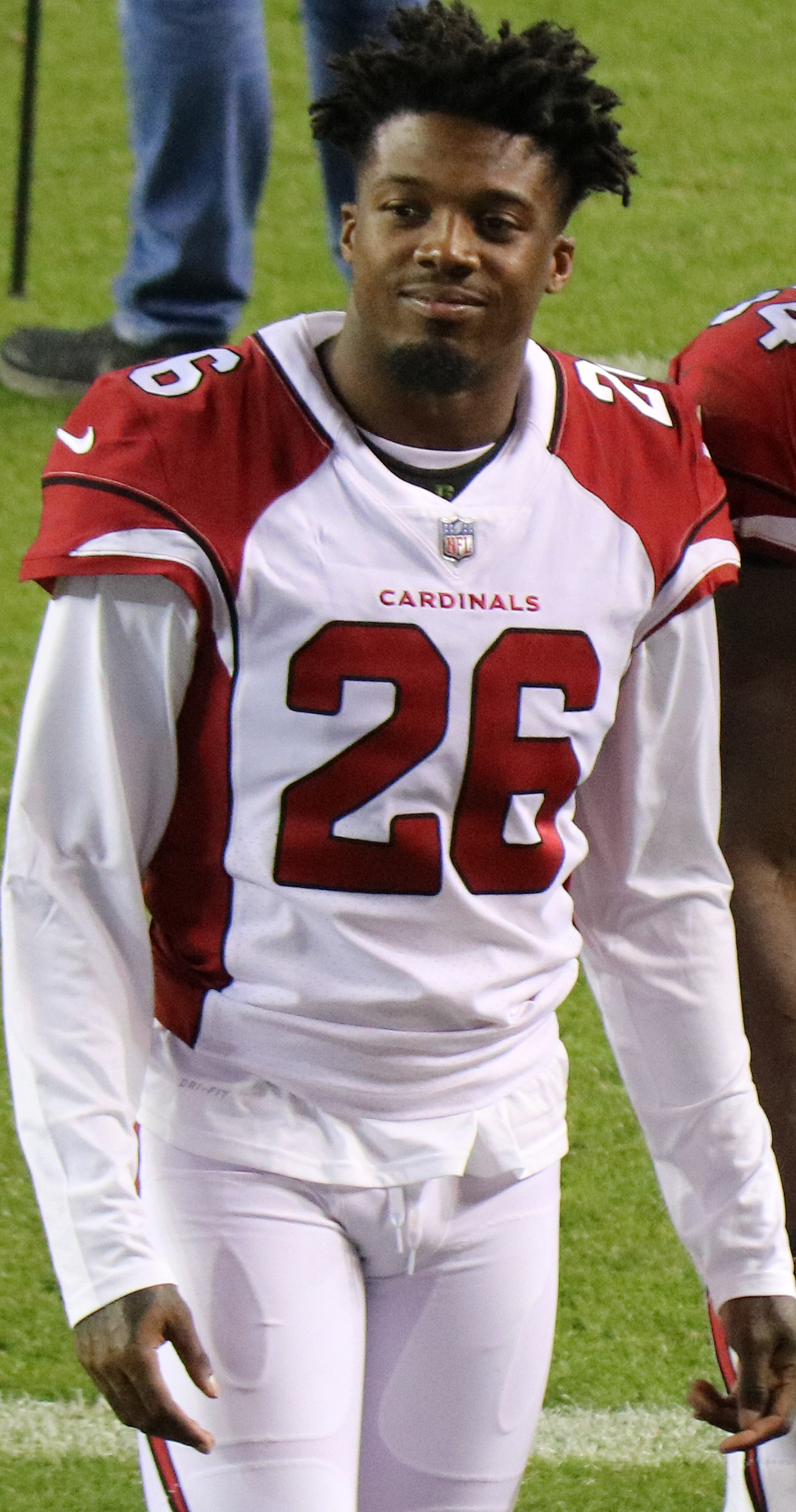
- Williams with the Arizona Cardinals in 2017

No. 26, 28, 37
- Position: Cornerback

Personal information
- Born: September 9, 1992 (age 34); Brookshire, Texas, U.S.
- Listed height: 6 ft 0 in (1.83 m)
- Listed weight: 200 lb (91 kg)

Career information
- High school: Royal (Brookshire)
- College: Texas A&M
- NFL draft: 2016: 3rd round, 92nd overall pick

Career history
- Arizona Cardinals (2016–2019); New York Giants (2020); Houston Texans (2020); Houston Gamblers (2022)

Career NFL statistics
- Total tackles: 39
- Pass deflections: 5
- Stats at Pro Football Reference

Brandon Williams (born September 9, 1992) is an American former professional football player who was a cornerback who played for five seasons in the National Football League (NFL). He played college football at Texas A&M. He was selected by the Arizona Cardinals in the third round of the 2016 NFL draft. He was a member of the Cardinals from 2016 to 2019, the New York Giants in 2020, and the Houston Texans in 2020.

== College career ==
Williams, originally a five-star running back out of Royal High School, started his college football career at Oklahoma. After finishing his true freshman season as the fourth-leading rusher for the Sooners, he decided to transfer to Texas A&M. He sat out the 2012 season due to NCAA transfer rules and played two more seasons at running back before Aggies coach Kevin Sumlin switched Williams to cornerback in his senior season.

== Professional career ==
=== Pre-draft ===
Coming out of Texas A&M, many NFL draft experts and analysts were split on the projected round Williams would be selected in. Some experts thought Williams could go as high as the third or fourth round, while some projected him to be a seventh round pick or a priority undrafted free agent. The conflict on grades stemmed from the little experience Williams had since he played cornerback in 13 games for one single season as a senior in contrast to his talent and ability. Many analysts felt he would be over drafted based on his athleticism and traits. He received an invitation to the NFL Combine and completed all of the combine drills and raised his draft stock after tying for sixth among all prospects in the 40-yard dash (4.37). On April 6, 2016, he participated at Texas A&M's pro day and opted to only perform positional drills for the team representatives and scouts from the 30 NFL teams. Defensive backs coaches from the Indianapolis Colts, Detroit Lions, and Oakland Raiders attended to personally scout and meet Williams. Williams was ranked as the 33rd best cornerback prospect in the draft by NFLDraftScout.com.

Pre-draft measurables
Height	Weight	Arm length	Hand span	Wingspan	40-yard dash	10-yard split	20-yard split	20-yard shuttle	Three-cone drill	Vertical jump	Broad jump	Bench press
5 ft 11 3/8 in (1.81 m)	197 lb (89 kg)	32 1/2 in (0.83 m)	8 5/8 in (0.22 m)	6 ft 6 1/4 in (1.99 m)	4.37 s	1.54 s	2.58 s	4.19 s	6.85 s	30.5 in (0.77 m)	9 ft 10 in (3.00 m)	18 reps
All values from NFL Combine

=== Arizona Cardinals ===
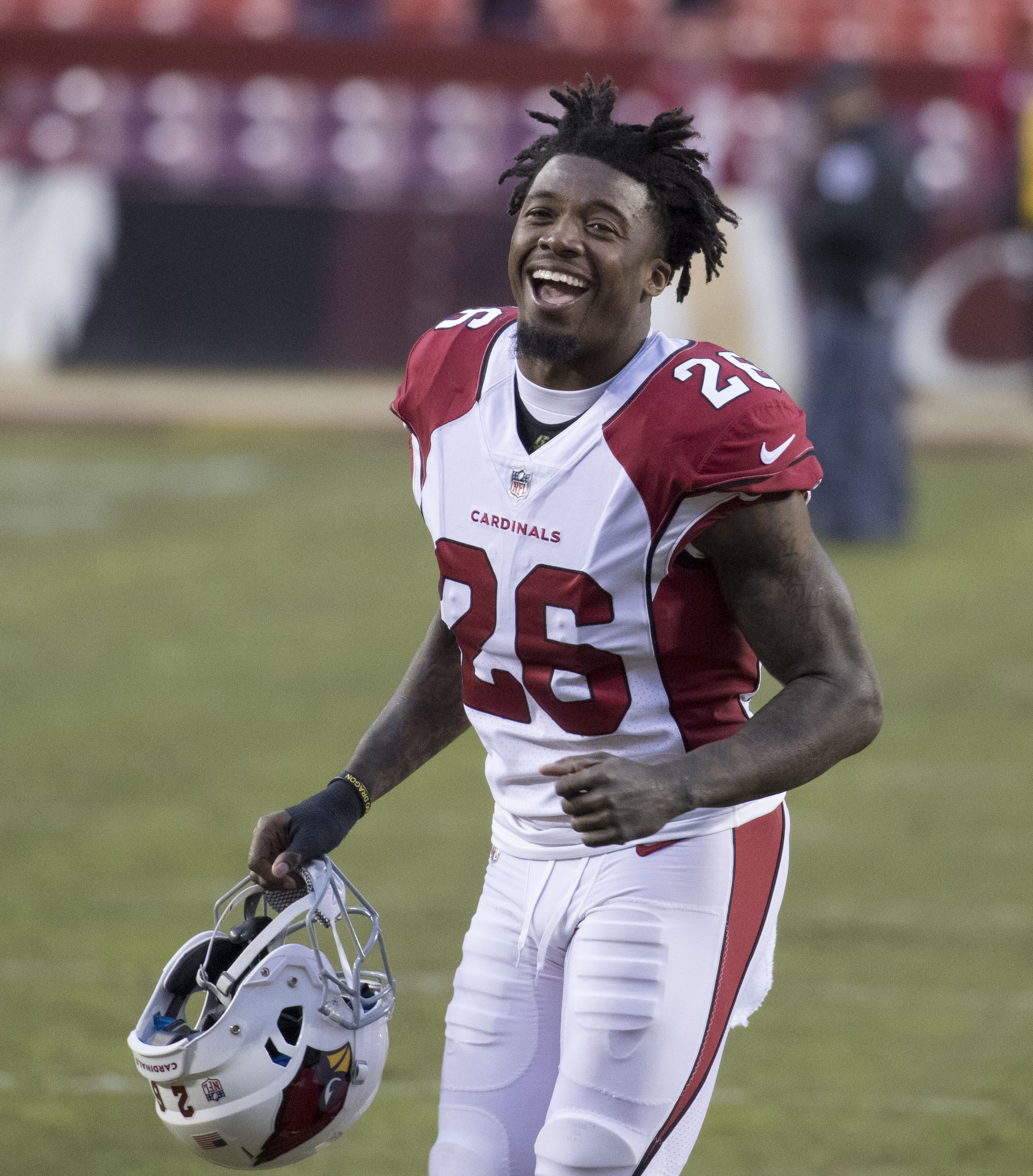
Williams in 2017

==== 2016 ====
The Arizona Cardinals selected Williams in the third round (92nd overall) of the 2016 NFL draft. He was the 14th cornerback selected in the draft.

On May 9, 2016, the Cardinals signed Williams to a four-year, $3.08 million contract that included a signing bonus of $672,695.

He competed with Asa Jackson, Tharold Simon, Harlan Miller, and Cariel Brooks throughout training camp for a job as a backup cornerback. After showing promise throughout camp, Williams climbed the depth chart and began to compete against Justin Bethel and Mike Jenkins for the vacant starting cornerback job left by the departure of Jerraud Powers. Head coach Bruce Arians named Williams the Cardinals' starting cornerback, along with Patrick Peterson, to begin the regular season.

He earned his first career start and made his professional regular season debut in the Cardinals' season-opener against the New England Patriots and finished the 21–23 loss with two combined tackles. Williams struggled throughout his debut and gave up a touchdown pass after missing a hand signal that switched the defense from zone to man coverage. In Week 2, he alternated plays with Marcus Cooper who the Cardinals acquired in a trade with the Kansas City Chiefs on September 2, 2017. By Week 3, Williams had been benched in favor of Cooper. On December 24, 2016, Williams recorded a season-high 11 combined tackles and a pass deflection in a 34–31 win over the Seattle Seahawks. In the second quarter, Williams was covering Seahawks' receiver Tyler Lockett as Lockett made a 28-yard reception. During the course of the tackle, Williams landed on Lockett's right leg, causing Lockett to break his tibia and fibula. He finished his rookie season with a total of 26 combined tackles (22 solo) and three pass deflections in three starts and 13 games. From Weeks 3–13, Williams did not play a single defensive snap and was inactive for three games during that span.

==== 2017 ====
Throughout the off season, Williams worked on learning coverages and his technique after struggling through a dismal rookie season. He entered training camp competing with Justin Bethel and Tramon Williams for the starting cornerback job. He was named a backup cornerback behind Patrick Peterson and Justin Bethel to begin the 2017 NFL season.

Through the first seven games of the season, Williams played sparingly and only made two tackles during that time.

==== 2018 ====
Williams played in 16 games in 2018, recording 10 tackles and two passes defensed.

==== 2019 ====
Williams was waived/injured during final roster cuts on August 31, 2019, and reverted to injured reserve the next day.

=== New York Giants ===
After becoming a free agent in March 2020, Williams had a tryout with the Colts on August 13, 2020, with the Kansas City Chiefs on August 17, 2020, and with the Chicago Bears on August 20, 2020.

Williams signed with the New York Giants on August 29, 2020. He was released during final roster cuts on September 5, 2020, but was re-signed the next day. He was placed on injured reserve on September 30, 2020. He was activated on November 7, 2020. He was waived on December 15, 2020.

=== Houston Texans ===
On December 22, 2020, Williams signed with the practice squad of the Houston Texans. He signed a reserve/future contract on January 4, 2021. He was released on March 2, 2021.

=== Houston Gamblers ===
Williams signed with the Houston Gamblers of the United States Football League on May 5, 2022. He retired from football on May 11.
