= List of Delta Sigma Theta national conventions =

Delta Sigma Theta is an historical African American sorority that was founded in 1913 at Howard University in Washington, D.C. Delta Sigma Theta held its first national convention in 1919 in Washington, D.C. The sorority currently holds biennial conventions and regional conferences, held for each region in the years in which conventions are not held. This list of Delta Sigma Theta National Conventions includes national conventions.

Number	Dates	Location	Notes	Refs
1	December 27, 1919	Howard University, Washington, D.C.	Three of the existing five chapters present. Plans were made to nationalize.	
2	December 28, 1920	Wilberforce University, Wilberforce, Ohio	Convention authorized The Delta Journal; Honorary Members; The Delta May Week and its slogan, "Invest in Education"; and alumnae chapters.	
3	December 31, 1921	University of Pennsylvania, Philadelphia, Pennsylvania	Committee on Standards appointed, also Committee on Scholastic Grades. Hosted by the Gamma chapter.	
4	December 1922	Chicago, Illinois	Convention authorized a Scholarship Award Fund and a College Tuition Loan Fund	
5	December 27, 1923 – December 30, 1923	Columbus, Ohio	Honorary membership accorded Mary McLeod Bethune. Alpha Phi Alpha convention in Columbus at the same time. Hosted by the Epsilon chapter.	
6	December 27, 1924 – December 31, 1924	YWCA, 137th Street, New York City, New York	Delta Sigma Theta Hymn adopted. Hosted by the New York Alumnae chapter.	
7	December 27, 1925 – December 31, 1925	Des Moines, Iowa	Regional conferences established. Revision of nomenclature for chapters.	
8	December 1926	Cincinnati, Ohio	First drive against inactivity in chapters.	
9	December 1927	Washington, D.C.	Strengthened program. Appointment of a National Vigilance Committee	
10	December 27, 1929	Pittsburgh, Pennsylvania	The First Biennial Convention. Policies set for internal organization.	
11	December 28, 1931	Nashville, Tennessee	First mixed chapter authorized	
12	August 27, 1933	Chicago, Illinois	Increased concern for standards. "B" rated schools accepted for Delta.	
13	August 10, 1935 – August 15, 1935	Los Angeles, California	Office of executive secretary created, not to be filled for some time.	
14	December 27, 1937 – December 31, 1937	Cleveland, Ohio	Much dissension about internal affairs.	
15	August 28, 1939 – August 31, 1939	St. James Presbyterian Church, Harlem, New York City, New York	Theme:"Broader Horizon for the Youth of Tomorrow"; 114 chapters represented. All chapters are required to take membership in NAACP. More support is enlisted for the Urban League. Hosted by the New York Alumnae Chapter.	
16	December 26, 1941 – December 30, 1941	Detroit, Michigan	Grand President delivered an address on "Social Maturity." Mary Bethune pointed to the need for Delta service in the war crisis. Particular stress on the service programs.	
17	August 24, 1944 – August 27, 1944	Wilberforce University, Wilberforce, Ohio	The convention was a year late because of World War II. The petition was made by undergraduates to be represented on the executive board. Gloria Hewlett was chosen as the first undergraduate second vice president.	
18	December 27, 1945 – December 30, 1945	Richmond, Virginia	First Convention with a theme: "Design for Living in a New Age." Eslanda Goode Robeson, wife of Paul Robeson, gave a speech about Africa.	
19	December 27, 1947 – December 31, 1947	San Antonio, Texas	Resolution to call on Congress to admit 100,000 selected refugees and displaced persons for the next four years in addition to the regular quota. Formal adoption and copyright of the name Jabberwock.	
20	August 23, 1948 – August 28, 1948	Kiel Auditorium, St. Louis, Missouri	Theme:"Human Rights - Our Challenge - Our Responsibility", Resolution to admit any qualified woman to Delta Sigma Theta, regardless of race, creed, or nationality. Creation of a public relations board	
21	August 15, 1950 – August 19, 1950	University of California, Berkeley, Berkeley, California	Theme: "Human Rights, from Charter to Practice"	
22	December 26, 1952 – December 31, 1952	Cleveland, Ohio	Establishment of a national headquarters. Reorganization of modus operandi-therefore called The Mending Conference. The position of executive director was approved.	
23	August 14, 1954 – August 20, 1954	Roosevelt Hotel, New York City, New York	Concern for undergraduate status and problems. The "blackball" was abolished. Dorothy Height was re-elected in a "harmony move". Hosted by the New York Alumnae chapter.	
24	December 26, 1956 – December 30, 1956	Detroit Michigan	Theme: "Windows on the World." Revision of nomenclature. Graduate chapters thereafter to be known as alumnae chapters. The member-at-large category is proposed. Martin Luther King Jr. delivered a speech.	
25	August 17, 1958 – August 23, 1958	Washington, D.C.	Theme: "The Challenge of Changing Patterns." An evaluation of the past and planning for the future. Plans made for the Golden Anniversary Period. The member-at-large category was adopted. Approximately 1,000 attendees. Held jointly with Alpha Kappa Alpha	
26	August 14, 1960 – August 21, 1960	Palmer House Hotel, Chicago, Illinois	Theme: "The Creative Life in Freedom and Dignity." Resolution to complete the maternity wing of the Chania Medical Center in Kenya. Resolution to support the stand taken by young Negro Americans to secure equal rights.	
27	August 11, 1963 – August 17, 1963	Americana Hotel, New York City, New York	Theme:"The Past Is Prologue". Was the sorority's Golden Anniversary Jubilee. Decision to participate in the March on Washington for Jobs and Freedom on August 28, 1963. Vote to launch voter registration drive among Negros. Hosted by the New York Alumnae chapter.	
28	August 14, 1965 – August 19, 1965	Ambassador Hotel, Los Angeles, California	Theme: "The Woman's Role in Civil Rights and War on Poverty"	
29	August 14, 1967 – August 18, 1967	Cincinnati, Ohio		
30	August 10, 1969 – August 18, 1969	Baltimore, Maryland	Theme:“One Nation or Two? , . . One Nation!”	
31	August 8, 1971 – August 13, 1971	Houston, Texas		
32	August 1973	Atlanta, Georgia	Barbara Jordan delivered speech	
33	1975	Seattle, Washington	Premiere of Countdown at Kusini, starring Ossie Davis and Ruby Dee	
34	August 11, 1977	Denver, Colorado		
35	1979	New Orleans, Louisiana		
36	August 1, 1981 – August 5, 1981	Washington Sheraton, Washington, D.C.		
37	August 12, 1983 – August 17, 1983	Detroit, Michigan	Resolutions: step up Black voter registration and promote the economic solvency of women	
38	1985	Dallas, Texas		
39	July 8, 1988 – July 14, 1988	San Francisco, California	75th Diamond Jubilee	
40	1990	Miami, Florida		
41	August 17, 1992	Baltimore Convention Center, Baltimore, Maryland	Theme: "The Delta Launch 2000: A New Leadership for a New Century"	
42	July 17, 1994 – July 24, 1994	St. Louis, Missouri	Planned to build and rehabilitate houses through Habitat for Humanity	
43	July 18, 1996 – July 24, 1996	Orlando, Florida	Co-hosted by Orlando Alumnae chapter	
44	August 8, 1998 – August 13, 1998	Hilton New Orleans, New Orleans, Louisiana		
45	July 18, 2000 – July 21, 2000	McCormick Place, Chicago, Illinois	Nearly 15,000 attendees	
46	July 19, 2002 – July 24, 2002	Georgia World Congress Center, Atlanta, Georgia		
47	July 22, 2004 – July 28, 2004	MGM Grand Las Vegas and Las Vegas Hilton, Las Vegas, Nevada	Theme:"Keeping the Connection, Building on the Past and Focusing on the Future". Nearly 12,000 attendees. Originally planned for San Diego, moved due to the passage of Proposition 209.	
48	July 27, 2006 – August 2, 2006	Philadelphia, Pennsylvania	Theme: "One Mission, One Sisterhood: Empowering Communities Through Committed Service"	
49	July 24, 2008 – July 30, 2008	Orlando, Florida	Theme: "One Mission, One Sisterhood: Empowering Communities Through Committed Service". More than 15,000 attendees.	
50	July 29, 2010 – August 4, 2010	New Orleans, Louisiana	Theme: "Delta Sigma Theta - A Sisterhood Called to Serve: Transforming Lives, Impacting Communities". More than 12,000 attendees.	
51	July 11, 2013 – July 17, 2013	Washington, D.C.	Theme: "Centennial Celebration"	
52	July 23, 2015 – July 29, 2015	Houston, Texas	Theme: “Uncompromising Commitment to Communities: Service, Leadership, Empowerment”	
53	August 3, 2017 – August 9, 2017	Las Vegas, Nevada		
54	July 9, 2019 – July 12, 2019	New Orleans, Louisiana	Theme: “ Joy in our Sisterhood, Power in our Voice and Service in our Heart”. The convention ended two days early, on July 12, 2019, due to Hurricane Barry. The sorority donated 17,000 meals to Second Harvest Food Bank.	
55	November 18, 2021 – November 22, 2021	Atlanta, Georgia	Theme: “Joy in our Sisterhood, Power in our Voice and Service in Our Heart ”	

== See also ==
- List of Delta Sigma Theta alumnae chapters
- List of Delta Sigma Theta collegiate chapters
- List of Delta Sigma Theta members
