= Royal High School (Texas) =

Public school in Waller County, Texas, United States

Location
- 3499 Royal Road; Brookshire, Texas 77423; United States; 29.8080°N 95.9615°W

Information
- School type: Public
- School district: Royal Independent School District
- Principal: Shalonda Dumas
- Faculty: 55.27 (on FTE basis)
- Grades: 9-12
- Enrollment: 774 (2021-2022)
- Student to teacher ratio: 14.00
- Colors: Blue and scarlet
- Athletics conference: UIL 4A
- Mascot: Falcon
- Website: www.royal-isd.net/o/high-school

Royal High School is a public high school educating students grades 9–12 located in unincorporated Waller County, Texas, United States, adjacent to Pattsion, 1.5 miles from Brookshire, Texas, and 3 miles from the Katy city limits. It is one of the two secondary schools and the only high school part of the Royal Independent School District. It is attended by students residing in the city of Brookshire and unincorporated communities in Waller County, including Pattison and Sunny Side. Students compete in UIL Region 4A. In 2022, the school received a "C" rating from the Texas Education Agency.

== Athletics ==
As of 2023, the Royal Falcons participate in the following sports:

- Baseball
- Basketball
- Cross country
- Football
- Golf
- Powerlifting
- Soccer
- Softball
- Tennis
- Track and field
- Volleyball

=== State Finalists ===
- Boys Soccer
  - 2026(4A/D2)

== Notable alumni ==
- Justin Cryer, college football linebacker for the Texas Longhorns
- Stan Kitzman, member of the Texas House of Representatives since 2023
- Brandon Williams, American football player
