= Royal Independent School District =

School district in Texas, United States

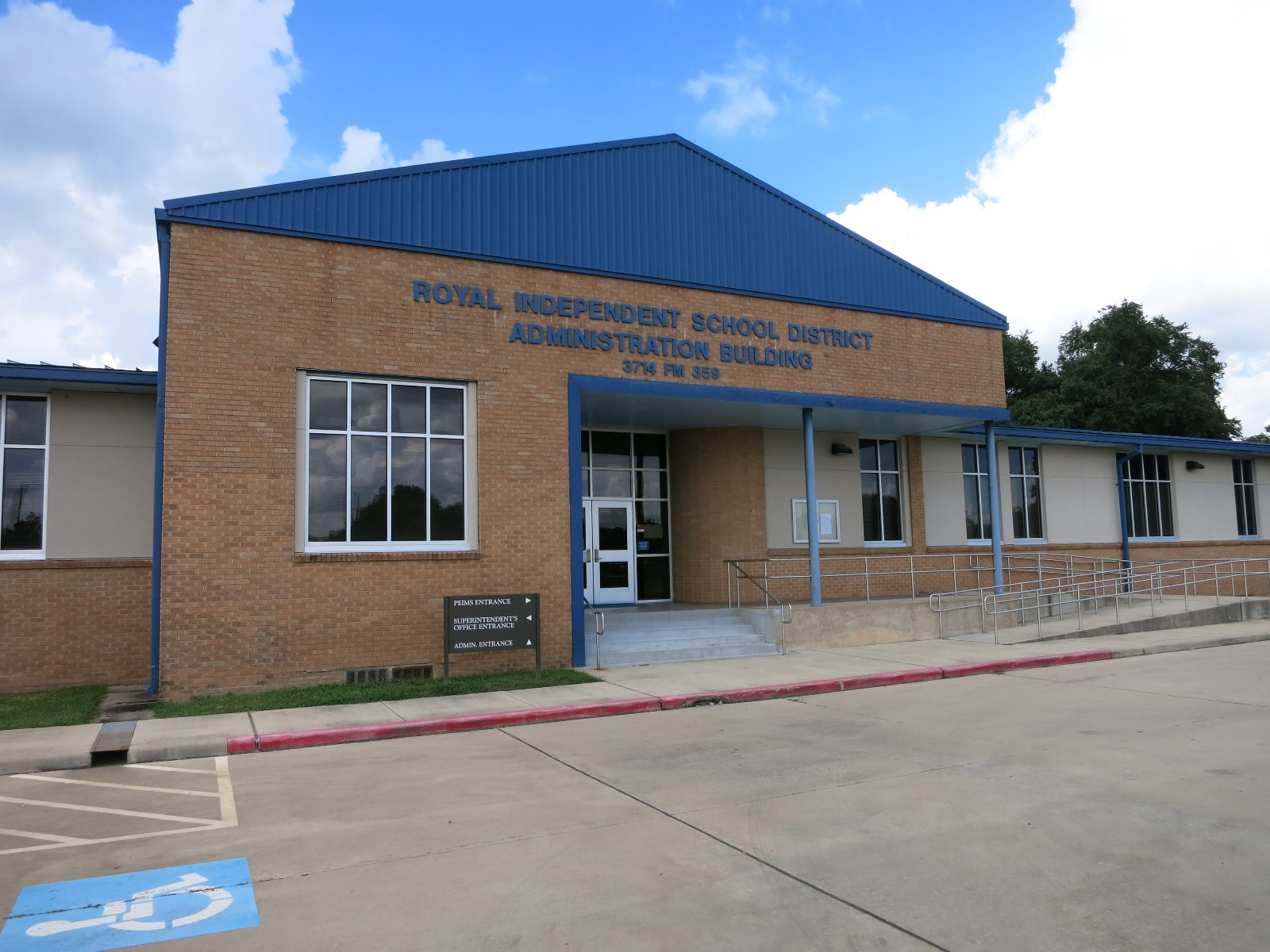
- Royal ISD Administration Building

Address
- 3714 Fm 359 Pattison, Texas, 77466; United States

District information
- Type: Public
- Grades: PK–12
- Schools: 4
- NCES District ID: 4838190

Students and staff
- Students: 2,729 (2023–2024)
- Teachers: 179.76 (on an FTE basis) (2023–2024)
- Staff: 212.12 (on an FTE basis) (2023–2024)
- Student–teacher ratio: 15.18 (2023–2024)

Other information
- Website: www.royal-isd.net

Royal Independent School District (RISD) is a public school district based in Pattison, Texas (USA).

In addition to Pattison, the district also serves the city of Brookshire and the community of Sunnyside.

The district was established in January 1959 as the Pattison-Brookshire Consolidated Independent School District, when the citizens of the Brookshire and Pattison School Districts voted to consolidate. In February 1960, the Board of Trustees adopted the district's current name.

In 2009, the school district was rated "academically acceptable" by the Texas Education Agency.

== Schools ==
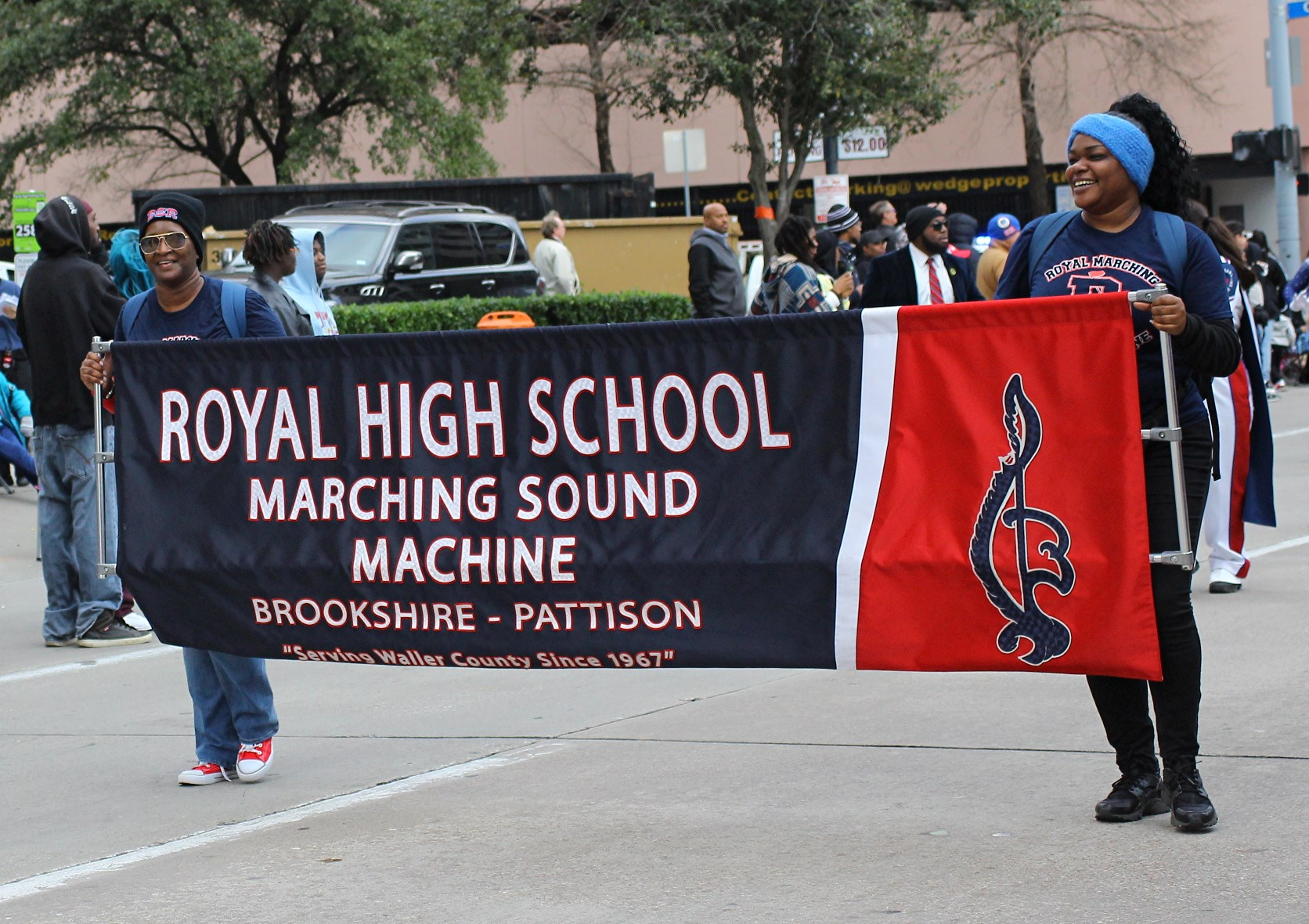
MLK Day parade banner from Royal High

- Royal High School (Pattison; Grades 9-12)
- Royal Junior High School (Pattison; Grades 6-8)
- Royal Elementary School (Pattison; Grades 2-5)
- Royal Prairie Elementary (Katy; Grades PK-5)
- Royal Early Childhood Center (Pattison; Grades PK-1)
- Royal STEM Academy (Pattison; Grades 2-8)

Royal ISD opened a new two-story high school and new early childhood center. The buildings were completed and opened by the 2009-2010 school year.
