= Brookshire Katy Drainage District =

The Brookshire Katy Drainage District (BKDD) is a political subdivision of the state of Texas which oversees the drainage of water within its boundaries. The district has its headquarters in Brookshire, Texas.
