= Pattison, Texas =

- City
- Location of Pattison, Texas
- Coordinates: 29°49′10″N 95°59′0″W
- Country: United States
- State: Texas
- County: Waller

Government
  - Mayor: Daphney Kirby

Area
  - Total: 3.53 sq mi (9.14 km^{2})
  - Land: 3.53 sq mi (9.14 km^{2})
  - Water: 0 sq mi (0.00 km^{2})
- Elevation: 171 ft (52 m)

Population (2020)
  - Total: 547
  - Density: 155/sq mi (59.8/km^{2})
- Time zone: UTC-6 (Central (CST))
  - Summer (DST): UTC-5 (CDT)
- ZIP codes: 77423, 77466
- Area code: 281
- FIPS code: 48-56108
- GNIS feature ID: 1343685
- Website: pattison.texas.gov

Pattison is a city in Waller County, Texas, United States. As of the 2020 census, the population was 547.

== Geography ==
Pattison is located at 29°49′10″N 95°59′0″W (29.819385, –95.983413).

According to the United States Census Bureau, the city has a total area of 3.2 square miles (8.4 km^{2}), all land.

=== Climate ===
The climate in this area is characterized by hot, humid summers and generally mild to cool winters. According to the Köppen Climate Classification system, Pattison has a humid subtropical climate, abbreviated "Cfa" on climate maps.

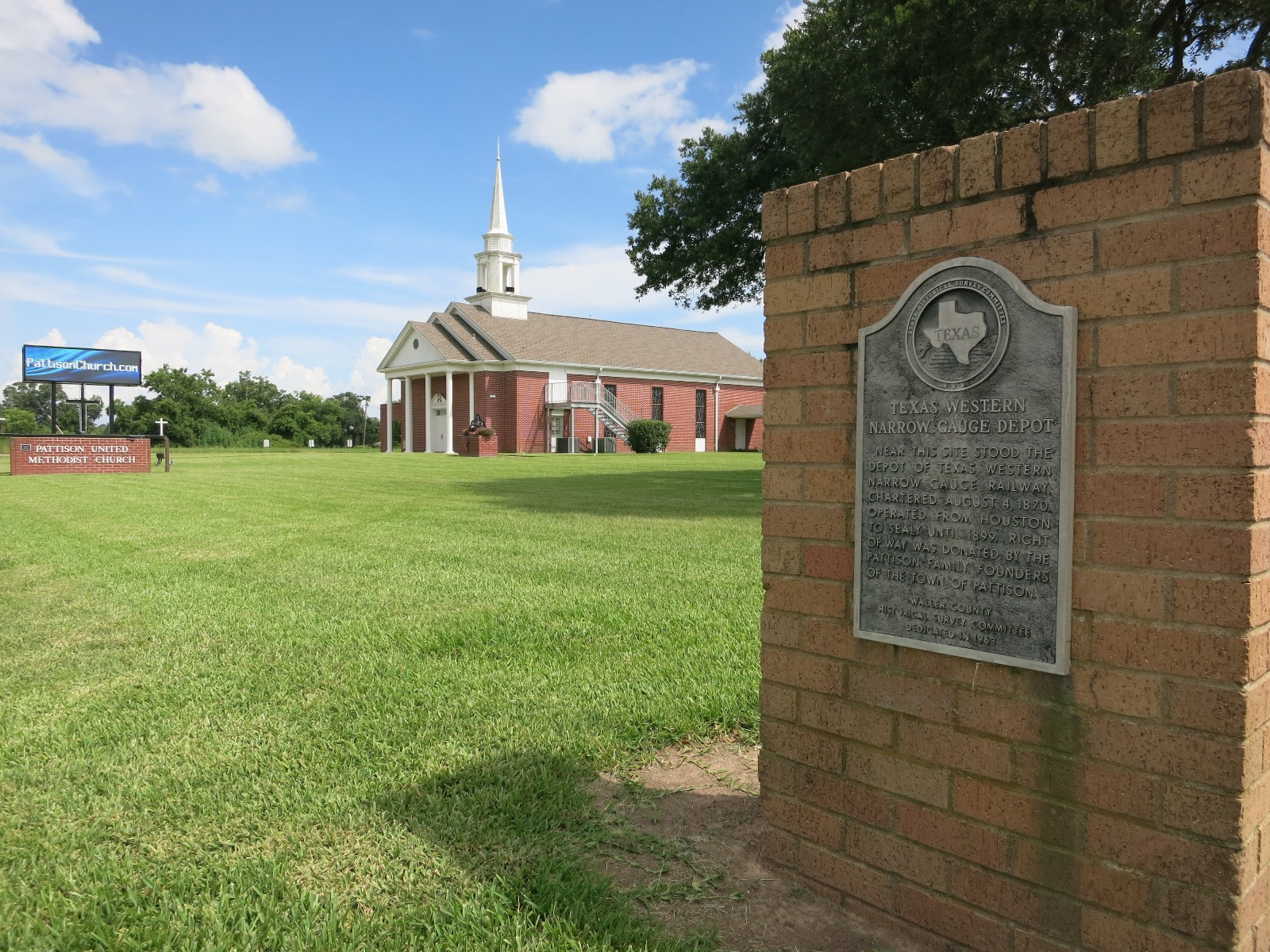
Texas historical marker at Pattison United Methodist Church marks the site of the old railroad depot.

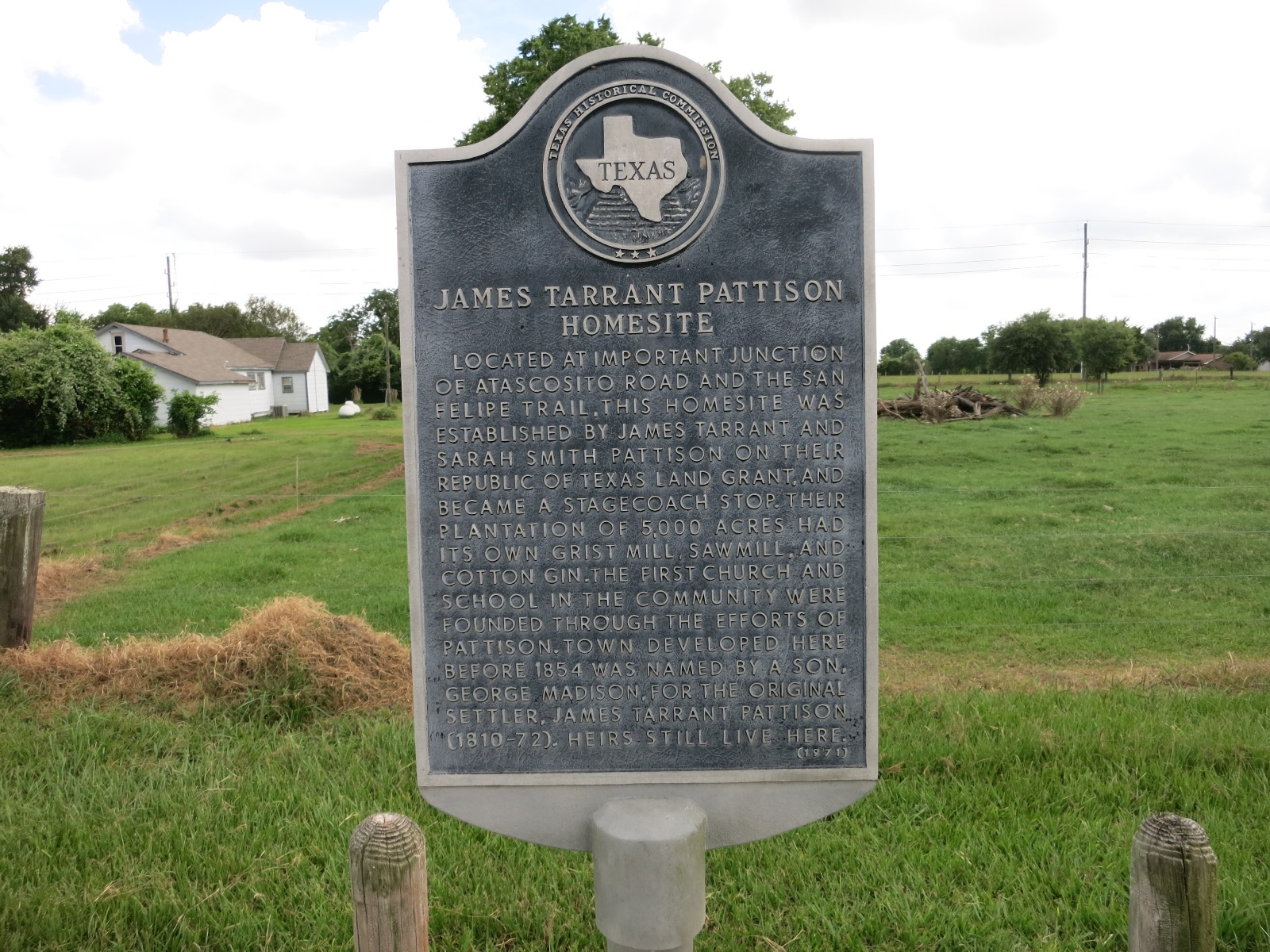
Texas historical marker is located on FM 359 at the James Tarrant Pattison home site.

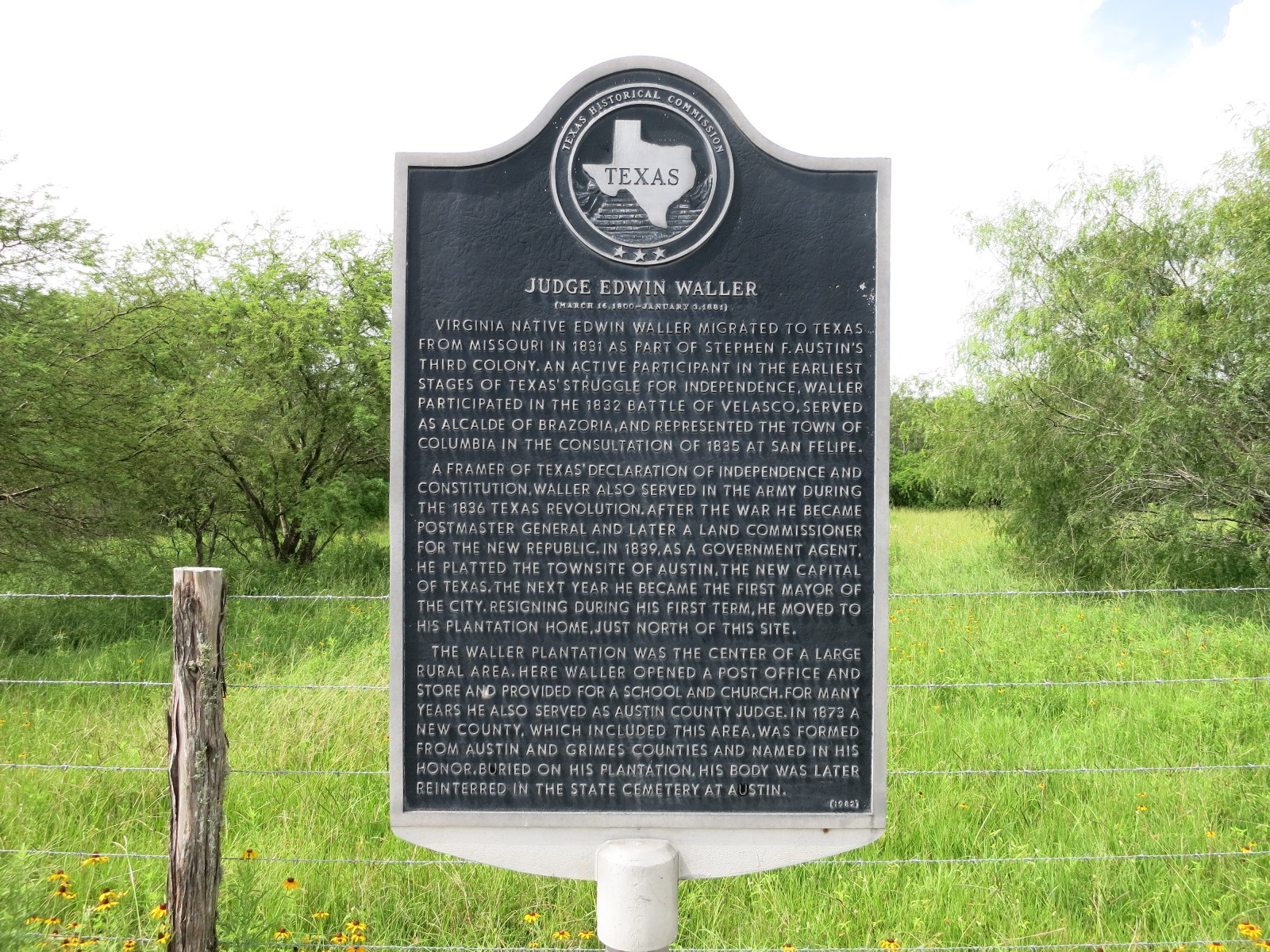
Judge Edwin Waller historical marker is west of Pattison along FM 1458 near Buller Road.

== Demographics ==
Historical population
Census	Pop.	Note	%±
1980	318		—
1990	327		2.8%
2000	447		36.7%
2010	472		5.6%
2020	547		15.9%
U.S. Decennial Census; 2020 Census

=== 2020 census ===
As of the 2020 census, Pattison had a population of 547 and a median age of 51.9 years.

20.1% of residents were under the age of 18 and 24.7% of residents were 65 years of age or older.

For every 100 females there were 98.2 males, and for every 100 females age 18 and over there were 91.7 males age 18 and over.

0.0% of residents lived in urban areas, while 100.0% lived in rural areas.

There were 206 households in Pattison, of which 35.0% had children under the age of 18 living in them. Of all households, 62.6% were married-couple households, 13.6% were households with a male householder and no spouse or partner present, and 18.9% were households with a female householder and no spouse or partner present. About 13.6% of all households were made up of individuals and 8.3% had someone living alone who was 65 years of age or older.

There were 229 housing units, of which 10.0% were vacant. The homeowner vacancy rate was 1.6% and the rental vacancy rate was 11.5%.

Racial composition as of the 2020 census
Race	Number	Percent
White	311	56.9%
Black or African American	28	5.1%
American Indian and Alaska Native	13	2.4%
Asian	5	0.9%
Native Hawaiian and Other Pacific Islander	0	0.0%
Some other race	93	17.0%
Two or more races	97	17.7%
Hispanic or Latino (of any race)	221	40.4%

=== 2000 census ===
As of the census of 2000, there were 447 people, 166 households, and 126 families residing in the city. The population density was 137.8 inhabitants per square mile (53.2/km^{2}). There were 186 housing units at an average density of 57.3 per square mile (22.1/km^{2}). The racial makeup of the city was 81.43% White, 9.40% African American, 0.45% Native American, 0.89% Asian, 5.82% from other races, and 2.01% from two or more races. Hispanic or Latino of any race were 19.24% of the population.

There were 166 households, out of which 36.1% had children under the age of 18 living with them, 62.7% were married couples living together, 12.0% had a female householder with no husband present, and 23.5% were non-families. 21.7% of all households were made up of individuals, and 9.6% had someone living alone who was 65 years of age or older. The average household size was 2.69 and the average family size was 3.14.

In the city, the population was spread out, with 26.4% under the age of 18, 7.4% from 18 to 24, 25.3% from 25 to 44, 26.0% from 45 to 64, and 15.0% who were 65 years of age or older. The median age was 40 years. For every 100 females, there were 87.8 males. For every 100 females age 18 and over, there were 80.8 males.

The median income for a household in the city was $43,250, and the median income for a family was $55,938. Males had a median income of $35,833 versus $38,375 for females. The per capita income for the city was $17,982. About 5.7% of families and 6.6% of the population were below the poverty line, including 3.8% of those under age 18 and 7.0% of those age 65 or over.

== Government and infrastructure ==
(Current as of 5/13/26)

Mayor - Daphney Kirby

Council Member #1 – Lee Cosina

Council Member #2 - Josh Taylor

Council Member #3 – Randal Flowers

Council Member #4 – Mayor Pro Tem – Wesley "Sandy" Buller

Council Member #5 – Anissa McGowan

The United States Postal Service operates the Pattison Post Office at 3637 2nd Street.

== Education ==
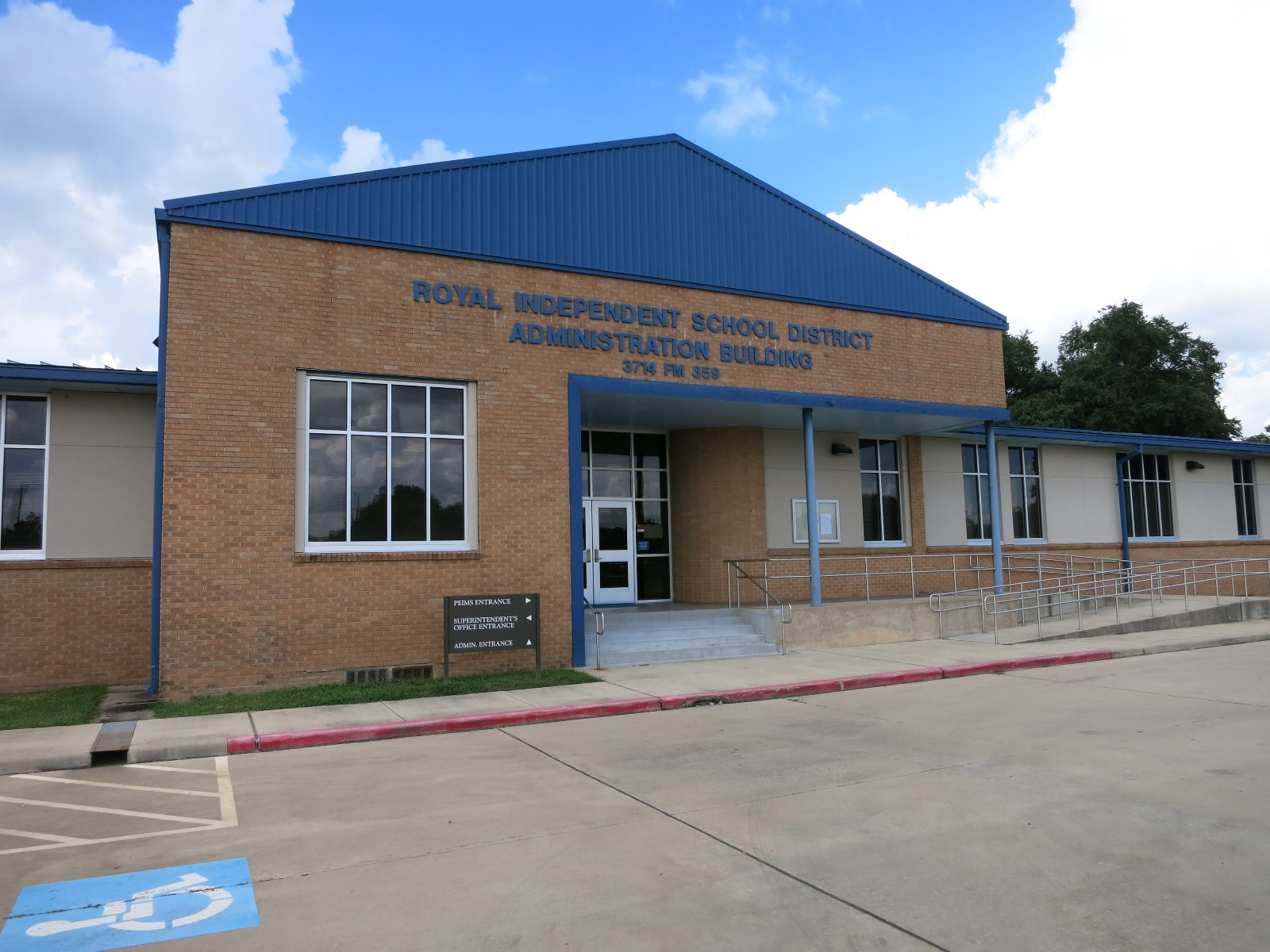
Royal ISD Administration Building

The City of Pattison is served by the Royal Independent School District.

All of Waller County is in the service area of Blinn College.

The Waller County Library System operates the Brookshire-Pattison Library in Brookshire.
