= Brookshire, Texas =

- City
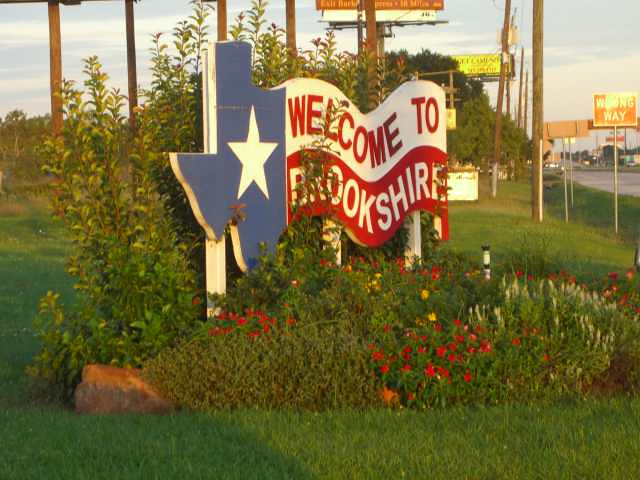
- Brookshire, Texas welcome sign.
- Interactive map of Brookshire, Texas
- Coordinates: 29°47′1″N 95°57′16″W
- Country: United States
- State: Texas
- County: Waller

Government
  - Mayor: Darrell Branch

Area
  - Total: 4.33 sq mi (11.21 km^{2})
  - Land: 4.33 sq mi (11.21 km^{2})
  - Water: 0 sq mi (0.00 km^{2})
- Elevation: 161 ft (49 m)

Population (2020)
  - Total: 5,066
  - Density: 1,343.3/sq mi (518.66/km^{2})
- Time zone: UTC-6 (Central (CST))
  - Summer (DST): UTC-5 (CDT)
- ZIP code: 77423
- Area codes: 281/346/713/832
- FIPS code: 48-10636
- GNIS feature ID: 1331324
- Website: Brookshire, Texas Official Website

Brookshire is a city in Waller County, Texas, United States, with a population of 5,066 as of the 2020 census.

== Location ==
Brookshire is located at 29°47′1″N 95°57′16″W (29.783737, –95.954325)., 34 miles west of downtown Houston along Interstate 10, seven miles west of Katy. It is part of the Interstate 10 Energy Corridor, part of the west Houston and Katy market, and a member of the West I-10 Chamber of Commerce. The population was 4,702 as of the 2010 census, with a total area of 3.5 square miles (9.1 km^{2}).

The city is named for Nathan Brookshire, a large land owner in the vicinity. He was a captain in the Texian Army and participated in the storming and capture of Bexar in 1835. In 1893, John Kellner donated land and filed a plat for the Town of Kellner out of the William Cooper Survey, one of the oldest headrights in the state. Also in 1893, John Brookshire and O. C. Drew filed their plat for the Town of Brookshire out of the H. H. Pennington Survey. On May 24, 1946, the City of Brookshire was incorporated, comprising both the Kellner and the Brookshire/Drew plats.

== Demographics ==
Historical population
Census	Pop.	Note	%±
1950	1,015		—
1960	1,339		31.9%
1970	1,683		25.7%
1980	2,175		29.2%
1990	2,922		34.3%
2000	3,450		18.1%
2010	4,702		36.3%
2020	5,066		7.7%
U.S. Decennial Census

=== 2020 census ===
As of the 2020 census, Brookshire had a population of 5,066. The median age was 32.8 years, with 28.9% of residents under the age of 18 and 9.5% of residents 65 years of age or older. For every 100 females there were 98.6 males, and for every 100 females age 18 and over there were 96.1 males age 18 and over.

0% of residents lived in urban areas, while 100.0% lived in rural areas.

There were 1,633 households in Brookshire, of which 45.9% had children under the age of 18 living in them. Of all households, 43.5% were married-couple households, 19.5% were households with a male householder and no spouse or partner present, and 29.9% were households with a female householder and no spouse or partner present. About 20.9% of all households were made up of individuals and 6.3% had someone living alone who was 65 years of age or older.

There were 1,787 housing units, of which 8.6% were vacant. Among occupied housing units, 57.4% were owner-occupied and 42.6% were renter-occupied. The homeowner vacancy rate was 0.6% and the rental vacancy rate was 10.5%.

Racial composition as of the 2020 census
Race	Percent
White	24.0%
Black or African American	27.1%
American Indian and Alaska Native	1.6%
Asian	0.6%
Native Hawaiian and Other Pacific Islander	<0.1%
Some other race	28.3%
Two or more races	18.5%
Hispanic or Latino (of any race)	53.9%

=== 2010 census ===
As of the 2010 U.S. Census, the population of Brookshire was 4,702, a 36% increase since the 2000 census.

=== 2000 census ===
As of the 2000 census, 3,450 people, 1,138 households, and 823 families resided in the city. The population density was 983.2 inhabitants per square mile (379.6/km^{2}). The 1,257 housing units averaged 358.2 per square mile (138.3/km^{2}). The racial makeup of the city was 32.67% White, 38.20% African American, 0.58% Native American, 0.38% Asian, 0.03% Pacific Islander, 26.09% from other races, and 2.06% from two or more races. Hispanics or Latinos of any race were 37.16% of the population.

Of the 1,138 households, 40.2% had children under the age of 18 living with them, 44.5% were married couples living together, 21.2% had a female householder with no husband present, and 27.6% were not families; 23.6% of all households were made up of individuals, and 8.7% had someone living alone who was 65 years of age or older. The average household size was 3.03 and the average family size was 3.56.

In the city, the population was distributed as 32.4% under the age of 18, 11.7% from 18 to 24, 30.6% from 25 to 44, 17.3% from 45 to 64, and 8.0% who were 65 years of age or older. The median age was 28 years. For every 100 females, there were 97.3 males. For every 100 females age 18 and over, there were 92.7 males.

The median income for a household in the city was $29,461, and for a family was $32,017. Males had a median income of $25,032 versus $18,674 for females. The per capita income for the city was $12,235. About 14.5% of families and 18.7% of the population were below the poverty line, including 24.1% of those under age 18 and 8.1% of those age 65 or over.

== Government and infrastructure ==
The mayor of Brookshire is Darrell Branch, who was elected May 4, 2019.

The Brookshire Katy Drainage District has its headquarters in Brookshire.

The United States Postal Service operates the Brookshire Post Office – 77423 at 4115 5th Street.

Rex White was serving as the city's chief of police when a riot broke out on July 6, 1978. According to a UPI story, the trouble started when White broke up a fight and put one of the combatants in his squad car. Some sixty people rushed out of their homes to confront White, pounding on the car and eventually chasing him back to the police station. Ten people were arrested in the incident, which White ascribed to there being "little to do in a small town on a hot day".

== Economy ==
Goya Foods has its Texas offices in an unincorporated area near Brookshire.

== Education ==
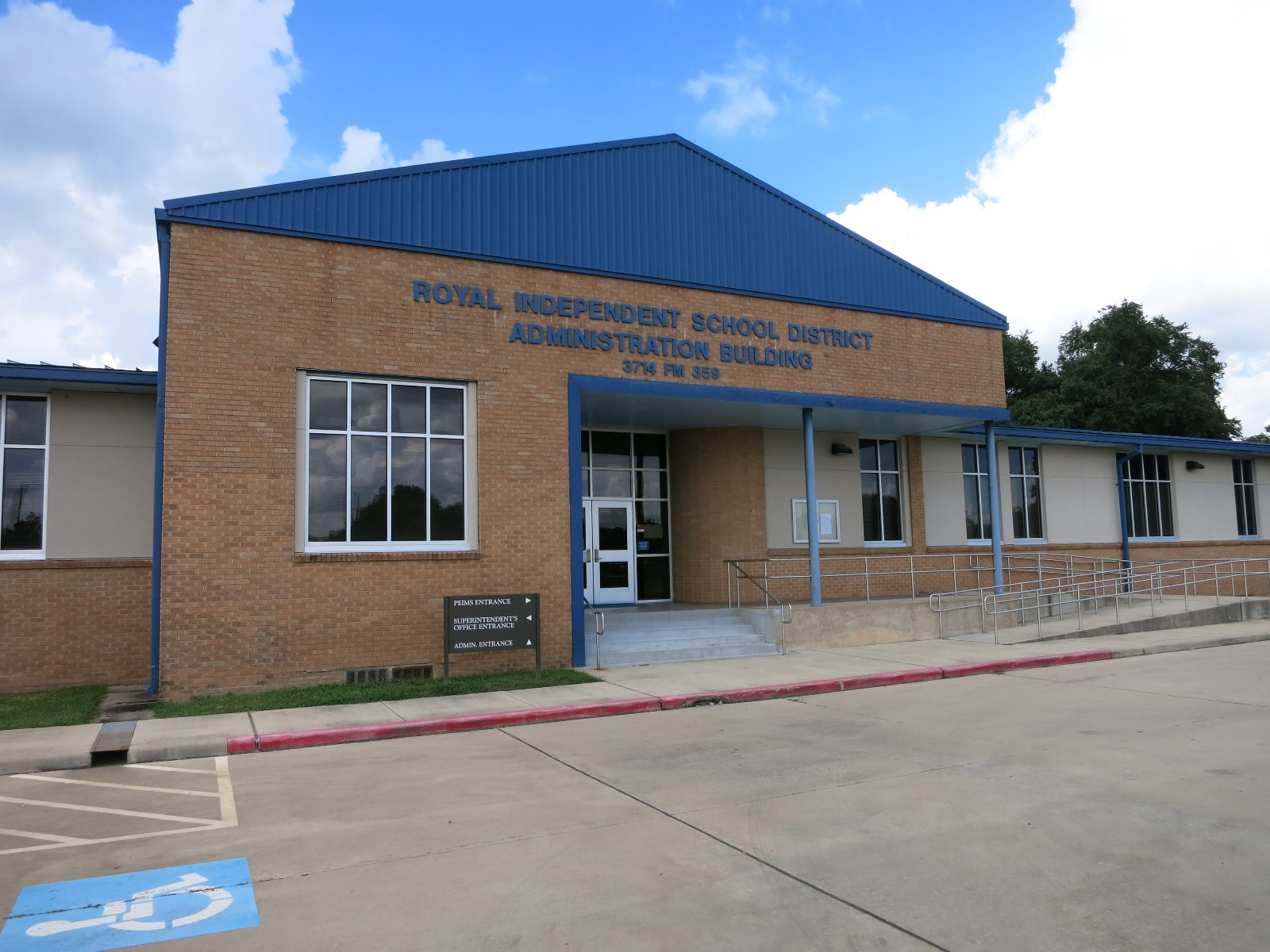
Royal ISD Administration Building in nearby Pattison

The City of Brookshire is served by the Royal Independent School District. The district operates Royal Early Childhood Center, Royal Elementary School, Royal Middle School, and Royal High School. It also has two schools of choice, Royal STEM Academy and Royal Early College High School.

All of Waller County is in the service area of Blinn College.

The Waller County Library System operates the Brookshire-Pattison Library.

Brazos Valley Sudbury School was located near Brookshire.

== Notable person ==
- Brandon Williams, NFL cornerback for three teams over five seasons
