= 2024 in sports =

2024 in sports describes the year's events in world sport. The main highlight for this year is the 2024 Summer Olympic Games and Paralympic Games in Paris.

== Calendar by month ==
=== January ===
Date	Sport	Venue/Event	Status	Winner/s
15 December 2023 – 3	Darts	(England) 2024 PDC World Darts Championship	International	(England) Luke Humphries
26 December 2023 – 5	Ice hockey	(Sweden) 2024 World Junior Ice Hockey Championships	International	United States
28 December 2023 – 6	Ski jumping	(Germany) / (Austria) 2023–24 Four Hills Tournament	International	(Japan) Ryōyū Kobayashi
29 December 2023 – 7	Tennis	(Australia) 2024 United Cup	International	Germany
30 December 2023 – 7	Cross-country skiing	(Switzerland) / (Italy) 2023–24 Tour de Ski	International	Men: (Norway) Harald Østberg Amundsen; Women: (United States) Jessie Diggins
1	Ice hockey	(United States) 2024 NHL Winter Classic	Domestic	(Washington (state)) Seattle Kraken
4–16	Water polo	(Croatia) 2024 Men's European Water Polo Championship	Continental	Spain
5–7	Speed skating	(Netherlands) 2024 European Speed Skating Championships	Continental	Netherlands
5–13	Water polo	(Netherlands) 2024 Women's European Water Polo Championship	Continental	Netherlands
5–19	Rally raid	(Saudi Arabia) 2024 Dakar Rally	International	Bikes: (United States) Ricky Brabec; Quads: (Argentina) Manuel Andújar; Cars: (Spain) Carlos Sainz; Challenger: (Spain) Cristina Gutiérrez; SSV: (France) Xavier de Soultrait; Trucks: (Czech Republic) Martin Macík
5–21	Bowls	(England) 2024 World Indoor Bowls Championship	International	Open: (Scotland) Stewart Anderson; Women: (England) Katherine Rednall
6–14	Ice hockey	(Switzerland) 2024 IIHF World Women's U18 Championship	International	United States
7–14	Snooker	(England) 2024 Masters (Triple Crown #2)	International	(England) Ronnie O'Sullivan
8	American football	(United States) 2024 College Football Playoff National Championship	Domestic	Michigan Wolverines
8–17	Shooting	(Indonesia) 2024 Asian Rifle/Pistol Championships	Continental	India
10–14	Figure skating	(Lithuania) 2024 European Figure Skating Championships	Continental	Italy
10–14	Track cycling	(Netherlands) 2024 UEC European Track Championships	Continental	Great Britain
10–28	Handball	(Germany) 2024 European Men's Handball Championship	Continental	France
11–25	Handball	(Bahrain) 2024 Asian Men's Handball Championship	Continental	Qatar
12–14	Short track speed skating	(Poland) 2024 European Short Track Speed Skating Championships	Continental	Netherlands
12 – 10 February	Association football	(Qatar) 2023 AFC Asian Cup	Continental	Qatar
13	Formula racing	2024 Mexico City ePrix (FE #1)	International	(Germany) Pascal Wehrlein ( (Germany) Porsche)
13–14	Luge	(Austria) 2024 FIL European Luge Championships	Continental	Austria
13 – 11 February	Association football	(Ivory Coast) 2023 Africa Cup of Nations	Continental	Ivory Coast
14–21	Shooting	(Kuwait) 2024 Asian Shotgun Championships	Continental	China
14–28	Tennis	(Australia) 2024 Australian Open	International	Men: (Italy) Jannik Sinner; Women: Aryna Sabalenka
15–21	Snooker	(England) 2024 World Grand Prix (Players Series #1)	International	(England) Ronnie O'Sullivan
16–20	Handball	(Argentina) 2024 South and Central American Men's Handball Championship	Continental	Brazil
16–21	Road bicycle racing	(Australia) 2024 Tour Down Under (UCI World Tour #1)	International	Men: (United Kingdom) Stephen Williams ( Israel–Premier Tech); Women: (Australia) Sarah Gigante ( (Belgium) AG Insurance–Soudal)
17 – 21	Cricket	(New Zealand) 2024 Women's Pacific Cup	Continental	Papua New Guinea
17–27	Handball	(Egypt) 2024 African Men's Handball Championship	Continental	Egypt
19–21	Speed skating	(United States) 2024 Four Continents Speed Skating Championships	International	Canada
19 – 1 February	Multi-sport event	(South Korea) 2024 Winter Youth Olympics	International	Italy
19 – 11 February	Cricket	(South Africa) 2024 Under-19 Cricket World Cup	International	Australia
20	Mixed martial arts	(Canada) UFC 297: Strickland vs. Du Plessis	International	(South Africa) Dricus du Plessis
20–21	Table tennis	(Switzerland) 2024 Europe Top 16 Cup	Continental	Men: (Slovenia) Darko Jorgić; Women: (France) Jia Nan Yuan
20-28	Netball	(England) 2024 Netball Nations Cup	International	Australia
24–27	Field hockey	(Oman) 2024 Women's FIH Hockey5s World Cup	International	Netherlands
24–28	Biathlon	(Slovakia) 2024 IBU Open European Championships	Continental	Norway
25–28	Rallying	(Monaco) 2024 Monte Carlo Rally (WRC #1)	International	WRC: (Belgium) Thierry Neuville & (Belgium) Martijn Wydaeghe ( (South Korea) Hyundai Shell Mobis WRT); WRC-2: (France) Yohan Rossel & (France) Arnaud Dunand ( (Belgium) DG Sport Compétition); WRC-3: (Czech Republic) Jan Černý & (Czech Republic) Ondřej Krajča
25–28	Ski flying	(Austria) FIS Ski Flying World Championships 2024	International	Individual: (Austria) Stefan Kraft; Team: Slovenia
26–27	Formula racing	(Saudi Arabia) 2024 Diriyah ePrix (FE #2 & #3)	International	Race 1: (United Kingdom) Jake Dennis ( (United States) Andretti Formula E); Race 2: (New Zealand) Nick Cassidy ( (United Kingdom) Jaguar TCS Racing)
26–28	Luge	(Germany) 2024 FIL World Luge Championships	International	Austria
26–28	Action sports	(United States) Winter X Games XXVIII	International	United States
27–28	Athletics	(Bolivia) 2024 South American Indoor Championships in Athletics	Continental	Brazil
28	Road bicycle racing	(Australia) 2024 Cadel Evans Great Ocean Road Race (UCI World Tour #2)	International	Men: (New Zealand) Laurence Pithie ( (France) Groupama–FDJ); Women: (Netherlands) Rosita Reijnhout ( (Netherlands) Visma–Lease a Bike)
28–31	Field hockey	(Oman) 2024 Men's FIH Hockey5s World Cup	International	Netherlands
30 – 3 February	Alpine skiing	(France) World Junior Alpine Skiing Championships 2024	International	Switzerland
30 – 4 February	Figure skating	(China) 2024 Four Continents Figure Skating Championships	International	Japan

=== February ===
Date	Sport	Venue/Event	Status	Winner/s
1–4	Indoor hockey	(Belgium) 2024 Men's EuroHockey Indoor Championship	Continental	Germany
1–4	Swimming	(Romania) 2024 European Ice Water Swimming Championships	Continental	Poland
1–11	Association football	(Mexico) 2024 CONCACAF Women's U-17 Championship	Continental	United States
2–4	Bobsleigh and skeleton	(Latvia) IBSF European Championships 2024	Continental	Germany
2–4	Cyclo-cross	(Czech Republic) 2024 UCI Cyclo-cross World Championships	International	Men: (Netherlands) Mathieu van der Poel; Women: (Netherlands) Fem van Empel
2–10	Futsal	(Paraguay) 2024 Copa América de Futsal	Continental	Brazil
2–18	Aquatics	(Qatar) 2024 World Aquatics Championships	International	China
2 – 16 March	Rugby union	(England) / (France) / (Ireland) / (Italy) / (Scotland) / (Wales) 2024 Six Nations Championship	Continental	Ireland
3	Ice hockey	(Canada) 2024 National Hockey League All-Star Game	Domestic	Team Matthews
3–10	Weightlifting	(Uzbekistan) 2024 Asian Weightlifting Championships	Continental	North Korea
4	American football	(United States) 2024 Pro Bowl Games	Domestic	National Football Conference
5–11	Nordic skiing	(Slovenia) 2024 Nordic Junior World Ski Championships	International	Norway
7–11	Biathlon	(Poland) 2024 IBU Junior Open European Championships	Continental	Austria
7–13	Air sports	(Qatar) 2024 FAI World Paramotor Slalom Championships	International	France
7–18	Biathlon	(Czech Republic) Biathlon World Championships 2024	International	France
8–11	Indoor hockey	(Germany) 2024 Women's EuroHockey Indoor Championship	Continental	Germany
9–11	Speed skating	(Japan) 2024 World Junior Speed Skating Championships	International	Netherlands
10	Formula racing	(India) 2024 Hyderabad ePrix	International	Cancelled
11	American football	(United States) Super Bowl LVIII	Domestic	(Missouri) Kansas City Chiefs
11–17	Tennis	2024 Qatar TotalEnergies Open	International	(Poland) Iga Świątek
12–15	Badminton	(Egypt) 2024 All Africa Men's and Women's Team Badminton Championships	Continental	Men: Algeria; Women: South Africa
12–18	Wrestling	(Romania) 2024 European Wrestling Championships	Continental	Turkey
12–18	Badminton	(Australia) 2024 Oceania Badminton Championships	Continental	Australia
12–20	Weightlifting	(Bulgaria) 2024 European Weightlifting Championships	Continental	Armenia
13–18	Badminton	(Malaysia) 2024 Badminton Asia Team Championships	Continental	Men: China; Women: India
14–18	Badminton	(Poland) 2024 European Men's and Women's Team Badminton Championships	Continental	Men: Denmark; Women: Denmark
15–18	Badminton	(Brazil) 2024 Pan Am Male & Female Badminton Cup	Continental	Men: Canada; Women: Canada
15–18	Rallying	2024 Rally Sweden (WRC #2)	International	WRC: (Finland) Esapekka Lappi & (Finland) Janne Ferm ( (South Korea) Hyundai Shell Mobis WRT); WRC-2: (Sweden) Oliver Solberg & (United Kingdom) Elliott Edmondson ( (Germany) Toksport WRT); WRC-3: (Sweden) Mille Johansson & (Sweden) Johan Grönvall
15–18	Speed skating	(Canada) 2024 World Single Distances Speed Skating Championships	International	Netherlands
15–25	Beach soccer	(United Arab Emirates) 2024 FIFA Beach Soccer World Cup	International	Brazil
16–25	Table tennis	(South Korea) 2024 World Team Table Tennis Championships	International	Men: China; Women: China
17	Mixed martial arts	(United States) UFC 298: Volkanovski vs. Topuria	International	(Georgia (country)) Ilia Topuria
17–18	Ice hockey	(United States) 2024 NHL Stadium Series	Domestic	Game One: New Jersey Devils; Game Two: (New York (state)) New York Rangers
17–19	Athletics	(Iran) 2024 Asian Indoor Athletics Championships	Continental	China
17–24	Curling	(Finland) 2024 World Junior Curling Championships	International	Men: Norway; Women: Switzerland
18	Basketball	(United States) 2024 NBA All-Star Game	Domestic	Eastern Conference
18	Stock car racing	(United States) 2024 Daytona 500	Domestic	William Byron (Hendrick Motorsports)
18–24	Tennis	(United Arab Emirates) 2024 Dubai Tennis Championships	International	Men: (France) Ugo Humbert; Women: (Italy) Jasmine Paolini
19–24	Archery	(Croatia) 2024 European Indoor Archery Championships	Continental	Italy
19–25	Snooker	(England) 2024 Players Championship (Players Series #2)	International	(Northern Ireland) Mark Allen
19–25	Road bicycle racing	(United Arab Emirates) 2024 UAE Tour (UCI World Tour #3)	International	Men: (Belgium) Lennert Van Eetvelt ( (Belgium) Lotto–Dstny); Women: (Belgium) Lotte Kopecky ( (Netherlands) Team SD Worx–Protime)
20	Ice hockey	(Switzerland) 2024 Champions Hockey League Final	Continental	(Switzerland) Genève-Servette HC
20 – 10 March	Association football	(United States) 2024 CONCACAF W Gold Cup	Continental	United States
21–24	Wrestling	(Mexico) 2024 Pan American Wrestling Championships	Continental	United States
22–25	Short track speed skating	(Poland) 2024 World Junior Short Track Speed Skating Championships	International	South Korea
22–27	Fencing	(Brazil) 2024 Pan American Cadets and Juniors Fencing Championships	Continental	United States
22–29	Association football	(Ecuador) / (Brazil) 2024 Recopa Sudamericana	Continental	(Brazil) Fluminense
22 – 3 March	Bobsleigh and skeleton	(Germany) IBSF World Championships 2024	International	Germany
23–28	Association football	(France) / (Spain) / (Netherlands) 2024 UEFA Women's Nations League Finals	Continental	Spain
23 – 2 March	Biathlon	(Estonia) Biathlon Junior World Championships 2024	International	Norway
23 – 3 March	Surfing	(Puerto Rico) 2024 ISA World Surfing Games	International	Men: (Brazil) Gabriel Medina; Women: (Australia) Sally Fitzgibbons
24	Road bicycle racing	(Belgium) 2024 Omloop Het Nieuwsblad (UCI World Tour #4)	International	Men: (Slovenia) Jan Tratnik ( (Netherlands) Visma–Lease a Bike); Women: (Netherlands) Marianne Vos ( (Netherlands) Visma–Lease a Bike)
24	Rugby league	(England) 2024 World Club Challenge	International	(England) Wigan Warriors
24–25	Motorcycle racing	(Australia) 2024 WSBK Australian round	International	R1: (Italy) Nicolò Bulega ( (Italy) Aruba.it Racing – Ducati); SR: (United Kingdom) Alex Lowes ( (Japan) Kawasaki Racing Team); R2: (United Kingdom) Alex Lowes ( (Japan) Kawasaki Racing Team)
24–28	Weightlifting	(Venezuela) 2024 Pan American Weightlifting Championships	Continental	Colombia
24 – 3 March	Shooting sports	(Hungary) 2024 European 10 m Events Championships	Continental	Germany
26 – 3 March	Figure skating	(Taiwan) 2024 World Junior Figure Skating Championships	International	Japan & United States

=== March ===
Date	Sport	Venue/Event	Status	Winner/s
1–3	Athletics	(United Kingdom) 2024 World Athletics Indoor Championships	International	United States
2	Endurance racing	2024 Qatar 1812 km (WEC #1)	International	Hypercar: (France) Kévin Estre, (Germany) André Lotterer & (Belgium) Laurens Vanthoor ( (Germany) Porsche Penske Motorsport); LMGT3: (Saint Kitts and Nevis) Alex Malykhin, (Germany) Joel Sturm & (Austria) Klaus Bachler ( (Lithuania) Manthey PureRxcing)
2	Formula racing	2024 Bahrain Grand Prix (F1 #1)	International	(Netherlands) Max Verstappen ( (Austria) Red Bull Racing-Honda RBPT)
2	Road bicycle racing	(Italy) 2024 Strade Bianche (UCI World Tour #5)	International	Men: (Slovenia) Tadej Pogačar ( (United Arab Emirates) UAE Team Emirates); Women: (Belgium) Lotte Kopecky ( (Netherlands) Team SD Worx–Protime)
2–9	Wheelchair curling	(South Korea) 2024 World Wheelchair Curling Championship	International	Norway
2–17	Association football	(Uruguay) 2024 U-20 Copa Libertadores	Continental	(Brazil) Flamengo
3	Marathon	(Japan) 2024 Tokyo Marathon (WMM #1)	International	Men: (Kenya) Benson Kipruto; Women: (Ethiopia) Sutume Kebede
3–10	Road bicycle racing	(France) 2024 Paris–Nice (UCI World Tour #6)	International	(United States) Matteo Jorgenson ( (Netherlands) Visma–Lease a Bike)
3–16	Association football	(Uzbekistan) 2024 AFC U-20 Women's Asian Cup	Continental	North Korea
4–10	Road bicycle racing	(Italy) 2024 Tirreno–Adriatico (UCI World Tour #7)	International	(Denmark) Jonas Vingegaard ( (Netherlands) Visma–Lease a Bike)
6–17	Tennis	(United States) 2024 Indian Wells Open	International	Men: (Spain) Carlos Alcaraz; Women: (Poland) Iga Świątek
7–8	Speed skating	(Germany) 2024 World Sprint Speed Skating Championships	International	Men: (China) Ning Zhongyan; Women: (Japan) Miho Takagi
8–23	Multi-sport	(Ghana) 2023 African Games	Continental	Egypt
9	Formula racing	(Saudi Arabia) 2024 Saudi Arabian Grand Prix (F1 #2)	International	(Netherlands) Max Verstappen ( (Austria) Red Bull Racing-Honda RBPT)
9	Mixed martial arts	(United States) UFC 299: O'Malley vs. Vera 2	International	(United States) Sean O'Malley
9–10	Speed skating	(Germany) 2024 World Allround Speed Skating Championships	International	Men: (United States) Jordan Stolz; Women: (Netherlands) Joy Beune
10	Motorcycle racing	2024 Qatar motorcycle Grand Prix (MotoGP #1)	International	MotoGP: (Italy) Francesco Bagnaia ( (Italy) Ducati Lenovo Team); Moto2: (Spain) Alonso López ( (Italy) Sync Speed Up); Moto3: (Colombia) David Alonso ( (Spain) CFMoto Aspar Team)
10–23	Association football	(Solomon Islands) 2024 OFC Women's Champions League final	Continental	(New Zealand) Auckland United
11–16	Wheelchair curling	(South Korea) 2024 World Wheelchair Mixed Doubles Curling Championship	International	South Korea
11–17	Snooker	(China) 2024 World Women's Snooker Championship	International	(China) Bai Yulu
13–31	Association football	(Paraguay) 2024 South American U-17 Women's Championship	Continental	Brazil
14–17	Golf	(United States) 2024 Players Championship	International	(United States) Scottie Scheffler
14 – 2 April	Multi-sport	(Pakistan) 2024 South Asian Games	Regional	Postponed to the beginning of 2025
15–17	Short track speed skating	(Netherlands) 2024 World Short Track Speed Skating Championships	International	China
15–17	Motorcycle racing	2024 ARRC Thailand round	International	R1: (Malaysia) Azlan Shah Kamaruzaman ( (Malaysia) TKKR BMW Racing Team); R2: (Indonesia) Andi Farid Izdihar ( (Japan) Honda Asia-Dream Racing with Astemo)
16	Formula racing	(Brazil) 2024 São Paulo ePrix (March) (FE #4)	International	(United Kingdom) Sam Bird ( (United Kingdom) NEOM McLaren Formula E Team)
16	Road bicycle racing	(Italy) 2024 Milan–San Remo (UCI World Tour #8)	International	(Belgium) Jasper Philipsen ( (Belgium) Alpecin–Deceuninck)
16–24	Curling	(Canada) 2024 World Women's Curling Championship	International	Canada
18–24	Figure skating	(Canada) 2024 World Figure Skating Championships	International	United States
18–24	Road bicycle racing	(Spain) 2024 Volta a Catalunya (UCI World Tour #9)	International	(Slovenia) Tadej Pogačar ( (United Arab Emirates) UAE Team Emirates)
19–22	Indoor hockey	(Canada) 2024 Men's Indoor Pan American Cup	Continental	Argentina
19–31	Tennis	(United States) 2024 Miami Open	International	Men: (Italy) Jannik Sinner; Women: (United States) Danielle Collins
19 – 8 April	Basketball	(United States) 2024 NCAA Division I men's basketball tournament	Domestic	(Connecticut) UConn Huskies
20	Road bicycle racing	(Belgium) 2024 Classic Brugge–De Panne (UCI World Tour #10)	International	Men: (Belgium) Jasper Philipsen ( (Belgium) Alpecin–Deceuninck); Women: (Italy) Elisa Balsamo ( (United States) Lidl–Trek)
20–24	Para-cycling	(Brazil) 2024 UCI Para-cycling Track World Championships	International	China
20 – 7 April	Basketball	(United States) 2024 NCAA Division I women's basketball tournament	Domestic	South Carolina Gamecocks
21–24	Association football	(United States) 2024 CONCACAF Nations League Finals	Continental	United States
21-26	Association football	(Algeria) (Azerbaijan) (Egypt) (Saudi Arabia) (Sri Lanka) 2024 FIFA Series	International	Algeria Bulgaria Croatia Cape Verde Guinea Central African Republic
22	Road bicycle racing	(Belgium) 2024 E3 Saxo Classic (UCI World Tour #11)	International	(Netherlands) Mathieu van der Poel ( (Belgium) Alpecin–Deceuninck)
23–24	Motorcycle racing	(Catalonia) 2024 WSBK Catalan Round	International	R1: (Turkey) Toprak Razgatlıoğlu ( (Germany) ROKiT BMW Motorrad WorldSBK Team); SR: (Turkey) Toprak Razgatlıoğlu ( (Germany) ROKiT BMW Motorrad WorldSBK Team); R2: (Spain) Álvaro Bautista ( (Italy) Aruba.it Racing-Ducati)
23 – 27 April	Rugby union	(England) / (France) / (Ireland) / (Italy) / (Scotland) / (Wales) 2024 Women's Six Nations Championship	Continental	England
24	Formula racing	(Australia) 2024 Australian Grand Prix (F1 #3)	International	(Spain) Carlos Sainz Jr. ( (Italy) Scuderia Ferrari)
24	Motorcycle racing	(Portugal) 2024 Portuguese motorcycle Grand Prix (MotoGP #2)	International	MotoGP: (Spain) Jorge Martín ( (Italy) Prima Pramac Racing); Moto2: (Spain) Arón Canet ( (Italy) Fantic Racing); Moto3: (Spain) Daniel Holgado ( (France) Red Bull GasGas Tech3)
24	Road bicycle racing	(Belgium) 2024 Gent–Wevelgem (UCI World Tour #12)	International	Men: (Denmark) Mads Pedersen ( (United States) Lidl–Trek); Women: (Netherlands) Lorena Wiebes ( (Netherlands) Team SD Worx–Protime)
27	Road bicycle racing	(Belgium) 2024 Dwars door Vlaanderen (UCI World Tour #13)	International	Men: (United States) Matteo Jorgenson ( (Netherlands) Visma–Lease a Bike); Women: (Netherlands) Marianne Vos ( (Netherlands) Visma–Lease a Bike)
27–31	3x3 basketball	(Singapore) 2024 FIBA 3x3 Men's Asia Cup (Singapore) 2024 FIBA 3x3 Women's Asia Cup	Continental	Men: Australia; Women: Australia
28–31	Rallying	(Kenya) 2024 Safari Rally (WRC #3)	International	WRC: (Finland) Kalle Rovanperä & (Finland) Jonne Halttunen ( (Japan) Toyota Gazoo Racing WRT); WRC-2: (Sweden) Gus Greensmith & (Sweden) Jonas Andersson ( (Germany) Toksport WRT); WRC-3: (Kenya) Hamza Anwar & (Kenya) Adnan Din
28 – 1 April	Field hockey	(Netherlands) 2024 Men's Euro Hockey League (Netherlands) 2024 Women's Euro Hockey League	Continental	Men: (Netherlands) Pinoké; Women: (Netherlands) Amsterdam
28 – 30 October	Baseball	(Canada) / (United States) 2024 Major League Baseball season	Domestic	(California) Los Angeles Dodgers
30	Athletics	(Serbia) 2024 World Athletics Cross Country Championships	International	Men: (Uganda) Jacob Kiplimo; Women: (Kenya) Beatrice Chebet
30	Formula racing	(Japan) 2024 Tokyo ePrix (FE #5)	International	(Germany) Maximilian Günther ( (Monaco) Maserati MSG Racing)
30	Horse racing	(United Arab Emirates) 2024 Dubai World Cup	International	Horse: (United States) Laurel River; Jockey: (Republic of Ireland) Tadhg O'Shea; Trainer: (United Arab Emirates) Bhupat Seemar
30 – 7 April	Curling	(Switzerland) 2024 World Men's Curling Championship	International	Sweden
31	Road bicycle racing	(Belgium) 2024 Tour of Flanders (UCI World Tour #14)	International	Men: (Netherlands) Mathieu van der Poel ( (Belgium) Alpecin–Deceuninck); Women: (Italy) Elisa Longo Borghini ( (United States) Lidl–Trek)

=== April ===
Date	Sport	Venue/Event	Status	Winner/s
1–6	Road bicycle racing	(Spain) 2024 Tour of the Basque Country (UCI World Tour #15)	International	(Spain) Juan Ayuso ( (United Arab Emirates) UAE Team Emirates)
1–7	Snooker	(England) 2024 Tour Championship (Players Series #3)	International	(Wales) Mark Williams
3–7	Trampolining	(Portugal) 2024 European Trampoline Championships	Continental	Great Britain
3–14	Ice hockey	(United States) 2024 IIHF Women's World Championship	International	Canada
7	Formula racing	(Japan) 2024 Japanese Grand Prix (F1 #4)	International	(Netherlands) Max Verstappen ( (Austria) Red Bull Racing-Honda RBPT)
7	Road bicycle racing	(France) 2024 Paris–Roubaix (UCI World Tour #16)	International	Men: (Netherlands) Mathieu van der Poel ( (Belgium) Alpecin–Deceuninck); Women: (Belgium) Lotte Kopecky ( (Netherlands) Team SD Worx–Protime)
7–14	Tennis	(Monaco) 2024 Monte-Carlo Masters	International	(Greece) Stefanos Tsitsipas
9–14	Archery	(Colombia) 2024 Pan American Archery Championships	Continental	United States
9–14	Badminton	(China) 2024 Badminton Asia Championships	Continental	Men: (Indonesia) Jonatan Christie; Women: (China) Wang Zhiyi
9–14	Badminton	(Germany) 2024 European Badminton Championships	Continental	Men: (Denmark) Anders Antonsen; Women: (Spain) Carolina Marín
10–13	Badminton	(Guatemala) 2024 Pan Am Badminton Championships	Continental	Men: (Guatemala) Kevin Cordón; Women: (United States) Beiwen Zhang
11–14	Golf	(United States) 2024 Masters Tournament	International	(United States) Scottie Scheffler
11–16	Wrestling	(Kyrgyzstan) 2024 Asian Wrestling Championships	Continental	Japan
11–21	Futsal	(Morocco) 2024 Futsal Africa Cup of Nations	Continental	Morocco
11 – 5 May	Association football	(Ecuador) 2024 South American Under-20 Women's Football Championship	Continental	Brazil
12–14	Basketball	(Turkey) 2024 EuroLeague Women Final Four	Continental	(Turkey) Fenerbahçe Alagoz Holding
12–20	Fencing	(Saudi Arabia) 2024 Junior and Cadet Fencing World Championships	International	United States
13	Horse racing	(United Kingdom) 2024 Grand National	International	Horse: (France) I Am Maximus; Jockey: (Republic of Ireland) Paul Townend; Trainer: (Republic of Ireland) Willie Mullins
13	Mixed martial arts	(United States) UFC 300: Pereira vs. Hill	International	(Brazil) Alex Pereira
13–14	Formula racing	(Italy) 2024 Misano ePrix (FE #6 & #7)	International	Race 1: (United Kingdom) Oliver Rowland ( (Japan) Nissan Formula E Team); Race 2: (Germany) Pascal Wehrlein ( (Germany) Porsche)
13–20	Futsal	(Nicaragua) 2024 CONCACAF Futsal Championship	Continental	Panama
14	Motorcycle racing	(United States) 2024 Motorcycle Grand Prix of the Americas (MotoGP #3)	International	MotoGP: (Spain) Maverick Viñales ( (Italy) Aprilia Racing); Moto2: (Spain) Sergio García ( (Spain) MT Helmets – MSi); Moto3: (Colombia) David Alonso ( (Spain) CFMoto Aspar Team)
14	Road bicycle racing	(Netherlands) 2024 Amstel Gold Race (UCI World Tour #17)	International	Men: (United Kingdom) Tom Pidcock ( (United Kingdom) INEOS Grenadiers); Women: (Netherlands) Marianne Vos ( (Netherlands) Visma–Lease a Bike)
15	Marathon	(United States) 2024 Boston Marathon (WMM #2)	International	Men: (Ethiopia) Sisay Lemma; Women: (Kenya) Hellen Obiri
15–16	Handball	(Algeria) 2024 African Handball Super Cup	Continental	Men: (Egypt) Al Ahly; Women: (Angola) Primeiro de Agosto
15 – 3 May	Association football	(Qatar) 2024 AFC U-23 Asian Cup	Continental	Japan
16–20	Equestrian	(Saudi Arabia) 2024 FEI World Cup Finals (show jumping and dressage)	International	Dressage: (Sweden) Patrik Kittel; Show Jumping: (Sweden) Henrik von Eckermann
17	Road bicycle racing	(Belgium) 2024 La Flèche Wallonne (UCI World Tour #18)	International	Men: (United Kingdom) Stephen Williams ( Israel–Premier Tech); Women: (Poland) Katarzyna Niewiadoma ( (Germany) Canyon//SRAM)
17–21	Air sports	(Macau) 2024 FAI European Indoor Skydiving Championships	Continental	France
17–28	Futsal	(Thailand) 2024 AFC Futsal Asian Cup	Continental	Iran
18–21	Golf	(United States) 2024 Chevron Championship	International	(United States) Nelly Korda
18–21	Rallying	2024 Croatia Rally (WRC #4)	International	WRC: (France) Sébastien Ogier & (France) Vincent Landais ( (Japan) Toyota Gazoo Racing WRT); WRC-2: (Bulgaria) Nikolay Gryazin & Konstantin Aleksandrov ( (Belgium) DG Sport Compétition); WRC-3: (Estonia) Romet Jürgenson & (Estonia) Siim Oja ( FIA Rally Star)
18–28	Amateur boxing	(Serbia) 2024 European Amateur Boxing Championships	Continental	Russia
19–21	Diving	(China) 2024 FINA Diving World Cup	International	China
20–21	Endurance racing	2024 GT World Challenge Asia (Malaysia round #1)	International	R1: (China) Cheng Congfu & (Hong Kong) Adderly Fong ( (China) FAW Audi Sport Asia Racing Team); R2: (China) Lu Wei ( (China) Origine Motorsport)
20–21	Motorcycle racing	(Netherlands) 2024 WSBK Dutch Round	International	R1: (Italy) Nicholas Spinelli ( (Italy) Barni Spark Racing Team); SR: (Spain) Álvaro Bautista ( (Italy) Aruba.it Racing-Ducati); R2: (Turkey) Toprak Razgatlıoğlu ( (Germany) ROKiT BMW Motorrad WorldSBK Team)
20–23	Judo	(Hong Kong) 2024 Asian Judo Championships	Continental	Japan
20–27	Curling	(Sweden) 2024 World Mixed Doubles Curling Championship	International	Sweden
20 – 6 May	Snooker	(England) 2024 World Snooker Championship (Triple Crown #3)	International	(England) Kyren Wilson
21	Endurance racing	(Italy) 2024 6 Hours of Imola (WEC #2)	International	Hypercar: (United Kingdom) Mike Conway, (Japan) Kamui Kobayashi & (Netherlands) Nyck de Vries ( (Japan) Toyota Gazoo Racing); LMGT3: (Brazil) Augusto Farfus, (Indonesia) Sean Gelael & (United Kingdom) Darren Leung ( (Belgium) Team WRT)
21	Formula racing	(China) 2024 Chinese Grand Prix (F1 #5)	International	(Netherlands) Max Verstappen ( (Austria) Red Bull Racing-Honda RBPT)
21	Marathon	(United Kingdom) 2024 London Marathon (WMM #3)	International	Men: (Kenya) Alexander Mutiso; Women: (Kenya) Peres Jepchirchir
21	Racewalking	(Turkey) 2024 World Athletics Race Walking Team Championships	International	China
21	Road bicycle racing	(Belgium) 2024 Liège–Bastogne–Liège (UCI World Tour #19)	International	Men: (Slovenia) Tadej Pogačar ( (United Arab Emirates) UAE Team Emirates); Women: (Australia) Grace Brown ( (France) FDJ–Suez)
21–27	Para swimming	(Portugal) 2024 World Para Swimming European Open Championships	Continental	Italy
21–28	Gymnastics	(Colombia) 2024 Pacific Rim Gymnastics Championships	Regional	United States
23–28	Road bicycle racing	(Switzerland) 2024 Tour de Romandie (UCI World Tour #20)	International	(Spain) Carlos Rodríguez ( (United Kingdom) INEOS Grenadiers)
24–28	Artistic gymnastics	(Italy) 2024 European Men's Artistic Gymnastics Championships	Continental	Seniors: Ukraine; Juniors: Great Britain
24-28	Real tennis	(United States) 2024 Real Tennis World Doubles Championship	International	(United States) Tim Chisholm & (United States) Camden Riviere
24 – 5 May	Tennis	(Spain) 2024 Madrid Open	International	Men: Andrey Rublev; Women: (Poland) Iga Świątek
25–26	Rhythmic gymnastics	(Rwanda) 2024 African Rhythmic Gymnastics Championships	Continental	Egypt
25−27	American football	(United States) 2024 NFL draft	Domestic	(United States) Caleb Williams ( (California) USC)
25–28	Judo	(Egypt) 2024 African Judo Championships	Continental	Egypt
25–28	Judo	(Croatia) 2024 European Judo Championships	Continental	Georgia
25–28	Judo	(Brazil) 2024 Pan American-Oceania Judo Championships	Continental	Brazil
25–28	Rowing	(Hungary) 2024 European Rowing Championships	Continental	Great Britain
25–5 May	Ice hockey	(Finland) 2024 IIHF World U18 Championships	International	Canada
26–28	Basketball	(Serbia) 2024 Basketball Champions League Final Four	Continental	(Spain) Unicaja
27–5 May	Badminton	(China) 2024 Thomas & Uber Cup	International	Thomas Cup: China; Uber Cup: China
28	Formula racing	2024 Monaco ePrix (FE #8)	International	(New Zealand) Mitch Evans ( (United Kingdom) Jaguar TCS Racing)
28	Motorcycle racing	(Spain) 2024 Spanish motorcycle Grand Prix (MotoGP #4)	International	MotoGP: (Italy) Francesco Bagnaia ( (Italy) Ducati Lenovo Team); Moto2: (Spain) Fermín Aldeguer ( (Italy) Speed Up Racing); Moto3: (Netherlands) Collin Veijer ( (Germany) Liqui Moly Husqvarna Intact GP)
28–5 May	Road bicycle racing	(Spain) 2024 La Vuelta Femenina	International	(Netherlands) Demi Vollering ( (Netherlands) Team SD Worx–Protime)
30–4 May	Swimming	(Angola) 2024 African Swimming Championships	Continental	Egypt

=== May ===
Date	Sport	Venue/Event	Status	Winner/s
1	Road bicycle racing	(Germany) 2024 Eschborn–Frankfurt (UCI World Tour #21)	International	(Belgium) Maxim Van Gils ( (Belgium) Lotto–Dstny)
2–4	Rhythmic gymnastics	(Uzbekistan) 2024 Asian Rhythmic Gymnastics Championships	Continental	Uzbekistan
2–5	Artistic gymnastics	(Italy) 2024 European Women's Artistic Gymnastics Championships	Continental	Seniors: Italy; Juniors: France
3–5	Artistic swimming	(France) 2024 World Aquatics Artistic Swimming World Cup	International	Austria
3–6	Artistic gymnastics	(Morocco) 2024 African Artistic Gymnastics Championships	Continental	Egypt
4	Horse racing	(United States) 2024 Kentucky Derby	International	Horse: (United States) Mystik Dan; Jockey: (United States) Brian Hernandez Jr.; Trainer: (United States) Kenneth McPeek
4	Mixed martial arts	(Brazil) UFC 301: Pantoja vs. Erceg	International	(Brazil) Alexandre Pantoja
4–5	Athletics	(The Bahamas) 2024 World Athletics Relays	International	United States
4–12	Rugby union	(Madagascar) 2024 Rugby Africa Women's Cup	Continental	South Africa
4–26	Road bicycle racing	(Italy) 2024 Giro d'Italia (UCI World Tour #22)	International	(Slovenia) Tadej Pogačar ( (United Arab Emirates) UAE Team Emirates)
5	Association football	(Oman) 2024 AFC Cup Final	Continental	(Australia) Central Coast Mariners
5	Formula racing	(United States) 2024 Miami Grand Prix (F1 #6)	International	(United Kingdom) Lando Norris ( (United Kingdom) McLaren-Mercedes)
5	Volleyball	(Turkey) 2024 CEV Champions League Final (Turkey) 2024 CEV Women's Champions League Final	Continental	Men: (Italy) Itas Trentino; Women: (Italy) A. Carraro Imoco Conegliano
5–18	Association football	(Sweden) 2024 UEFA Women's Under-17 Championship	Continental	Spain
6–12	Handball	(Mexico) 2024 Nor.Ca. Men's Handball Championship	Continental	Cuba
6–19	Association football	(Indonesia) 2024 AFC U-17 Women's Asian Cup	Continental	North Korea
7–12	Archery	(Germany) 2024 European Archery Championships	Continental	Turkey
8–12	Floorball	(Finland) 2024 Women's U-19 World Floorball Championships	International	Sweden
8–12	Karate	(Croatia) 2024 European Karate Championships	Continental	Turkey
8–19	Tennis	(Italy) 2024 Italian Open	International	Men: (Germany) Alexander Zverev; Women: (Poland) Iga Świątek
9–12	Golf	(United States) The Tradition	International	(United States) Doug Barron
9–12	Rallying	2024 Rally de Portugal (WRC #5)	International	WRC: (France) Sébastien Ogier & (France) Vincent Landais ( (Japan) Toyota Gazoo Racing WRT); WRC-2: (Spain) Jan Solans & (Spain) Rodrigo Sanjuan de Eusebio; WRC-3: (Paraguay) Diego Dominguez Jr. & (Spain) Rogelio Peñate
9–12	Taekwondo	(Serbia) 2024 European Taekwondo Championships	Continental	Croatia
9–18	Squash	(Egypt) 2024 PSA Men's World Squash Championship (Egypt) 2024 PSA Women's World Squash Championship	International	Men: (Peru) Diego Elías; Women: (Egypt) Nouran Gohar
10–26	Ice Hockey	(Czech Republic) 2024 IIHF World Championship	International	Czech Republic
11	Endurance racing	(Belgium) 2024 6 Hours of Spa-Francorchamps (WEC #3)	International	Hypercar: (United Kingdom) Callum Ilott (United Kingdom) Will Stevens & ( (United Kingdom) Hertz Team Jota); LMGT3: (Austria) Richard Lietz, (Netherlands) Morris Schuring & (Australia) Yasser Shahin ( (Germany) Manthey EMA)
11–12	Formula racing	(Germany) 2024 Berlin ePrix (FE #9 & #10)	International	Race 1: (New Zealand) Nick Cassidy ( (United Kingdom) Jaguar TCS Racing); Race 2: (Portugal) António Félix da Costa ( (Germany) TAG Heuer Porsche Formula E Team)
11–24	Association football	(French Polynesia) 2024 OFC Champions League final	Continental	(New Zealand) Auckland City
11–25	Association football	(Japan) / (United Arab Emirates) 2024 AFC Champions League Final	Continental	(United Arab Emirates) Al Ain
12	Motorcycle racing	(France) 2024 French motorcycle Grand Prix (MotoGP #5)	International	MotoGP: (Spain) Jorge Martin ( (Italy) Prima Pramac Racing); Moto2: (Spain) Sergio García ( (Spain) MT Helmets – MSi); Moto3: (Colombia) David Alonso ( (Spain) CFMoto Gaviota Aspar Team)
12–19	Association football	(Morocco) / (Egypt) 2024 CAF Confederation Cup Final	Continental	(Egypt) Zamalek
13–16	Indoor hockey	(Thailand) 2024 Women's Indoor Hockey Asia Cup	Continental	Thailand
14–23 June	Volleyball	(Thailand) 2024 FIVB Volleyball Women's Nations League	International	Italy
14–19 September	Basketball	(United States) 2024 WNBA season	Domestic	(New York (state)) New York Liberty
15–19	Canoe slalom	(Slovenia) 2024 European Canoe Slalom Championships	Continental	Czech Republic & Slovenia
16–18	Taekwondo	(Vietnam) 2024 Asian Taekwondo Championships	Continental	Iran
16–19	Artistic gymnastics	(Uzbekistan) 2024 Asian Men's Artistic Gymnastics Championships	Continental	China
16–19	Golf	(United States) 2024 PGA Championship	International	(United States) Xander Schauffele
17–25	Athletics	(Japan) 2024 World Para Athletics Championships	International	China
18	Horse racing	(United States) 2024 Preakness Stakes	Domestic	Horse: (United States) Seize the Grey; Jockey: (Puerto Rico) Jaime Torres; Trainer: (United States) D. Wayne Lukas
18	Auto racing	(Italy) 2024 GT World Challenge Europe Sprint Cup (Misano round #2)	International	R1: (Italy) Valentino Rossi & (Belgium) Maxime Martin ( (Belgium) Team WRT); R2: (Belgium) Dries Vanthoor & (Belgium) Charles Weerts ( (Belgium) Team WRT)
18	Professional boxing	(Saudi Arabia) Tyson Fury vs. Oleksandr Usyk	International	(Ukraine) Oleksandr Usyk
18–25	Association football	(Tunisia) / (Egypt) 2024 CAF Champions League Final	Continental	(Egypt) Al Ahly
18-26	Sepak Takraw	(Malaysia) 2024 ISTAF World Cup	International	Thailand
19	Formula racing	(Italy) 2024 Emilia Romagna Grand Prix (F1 #7)	International	(Netherlands) Max Verstappen ( (Austria) Red Bull Racing-Honda RBPT)
19–24	Judo	(United Arab Emirates) 2024 World Judo Championships	International	Japan
19–26	Futsal	(Argentina) 2024 Copa Libertadores de Futsal	Continental	(Brazil) Magnus Futsal
20–26	Wrestling	(Azerbaijan) 2024 European U23 Wrestling Championships	Continental	Azerbaijan
20–5 June	Association football	(Cyprus) 2024 UEFA European Under-17 Championship	Continental	Italy
21–25	Indoor hockey	(Kazakhstan) 2024 Men's Indoor Hockey Asia Cup	Continental	Iran
21–1 June	Air sports	(Spain) 2024 FAI European Paragliding Championship	Continental	Great Britain
21–30 June	Volleyball	(Poland) 2024 FIVB Volleyball Men's Nations League	International	France
22	Association football	(Republic of Ireland) 2024 UEFA Europa League Final	Continental	(Italy) Atalanta
22–26	Artistic gymnastics	(Colombia) 2024 Pan American Artistic Gymnastics Championships	Continental	United States
22–26	Artistic swimming	(Greece) 2024 European Youth Artistic Swimming Championships	Continental	Spain
22–26	Rhythmic gymnastics	(Hungary) 2024 Rhythmic Gymnastics European Championships	Continental	Bulgaria
22–29	Volleyball	(Philippines) 2024 Asian Women's Volleyball Challenge Cup	Continental	Vietnam
22 – 1 June	Rugby union	(Hong Kong) 2024 Asia Rugby Women's Championship	Continental	Japan
23–26	Indoor hockey	(Namibia) 2024 Men's Indoor Africa Cup (Namibia) 2024 Women's Indoor Africa Cup	Continental	Men: Namibia; Women: South Africa
24–26	Artistic gymnastics	(Uzbekistan) 2024 Asian Women's Artistic Gymnastics Championships	Continental	China
24–26	Basketball	(Germany) 2024 EuroLeague Final Four	Continental	(Greece) Panathinaikos
24–26	Sumo	(Greece) 2024 European Sumo Championships	Continental	Ukraine
24–2	Rugby union	(Australia) 2024 Oceania Rugby Women's Championship	Continental	Fiji
25	Association football	(Spain) 2024 UEFA Women's Champions League Final	Continental	(Spain) Barcelona
25	Rugby union	(England) 2024 European Rugby Champions Cup Final	Continental	(France) Toulouse
25–26	Formula racing	(China) 2024 Shanghai ePrix (FE #11 & #12)	International	Race 1: (New Zealand) Mitch Evans ( (United Kingdom) Jaguar TCS Racing); Race 2: (Portugal) António Félix da Costa ( (Germany) TAG Heuer Porsche Formula E Team)
26	Formula racing	2024 Monaco Grand Prix (F1 #8)	International	(Monaco) Charles Leclerc ( (Italy) Scuderia Ferrari)
26	Motorcycle racing	(Catalonia) 2024 Catalan motorcycle Grand Prix (MotoGP #6)	International	MotoGP: (Italy) Francesco Bagnaia ( (Italy) Ducati Lenovo Team); Moto2: (Japan) Ai Ogura ( (Spain) MT Helmets – MSi); Moto3: (Colombia) David Alonso ( (Spain) CFMoto Aspar Team)
26	Indy car racing	(United States) 2024 Indianapolis 500 (IndyCar #5)	International	(United States) Josef Newgarden ( (United States) Team Penske)
26 − 9 June	Tennis	(France) 2024 French Open	International	Men: (Spain) Carlos Alcaraz; Women: (Poland) Iga Świątek
27 – 1 June	Nine-pin bowling	(Slovakia) 2024 World Singles Ninepin Bowling Classic Championships	International	Germany
29	Association football	(Greece) 2024 UEFA Europa Conference League Final	Continental	(Greece) Olympiacos
30 – 2 June	Golf	(United States) 2024 U.S. Women's Open	International	(Japan) Yuka Saso
30 – 2 June	Rallying	(Italy) 2024 Rally Italia Sardegna (WRC #6)	International	WRC: (Estonia) Ott Tänak & (Estonia) Martin Järveoja ( (South Korea) Hyundai Shell Mobis WRT); WRC-2: (Finland) Sami Pajari & (Finland) Enni Mälkönen ( (Finland) Printsport); WRC-3: (Paraguay) Diego Dominguez Jr. & (Spain) Rogelio Peñate

=== June ===
Date	Sport	Venue/Event	Status	Winner/s
1	Association football	(Mexico) 2024 CONCACAF Champions Cup Final	Continental	(Mexico) Pachuca
1	Association football	(England) 2024 UEFA Champions League Final	Continental	(Spain) Real Madrid
1	Basketball	(Rwanda) 2024 BAL Final	Continental	(Angola) Petro de Luanda
1	Horse racing	(United Kingdom) 2024 Epsom Derby	International	Horse: (United States) City Of Troy; Jockey: (United Kingdom) Ryan Moore; Trainer: (Republic of Ireland) Aidan O'Brien
1	Mixed martial arts	(United States) UFC 302: Makhachev vs. Poirier	International	(Russia) Islam Makhachev
1–2	Handball	(Hungary) 2024 Women's EHF Champions League Final Four	Continental	(Hungary) Győri Audi ETO KC
1–2	Rowing	(Poland) 2024 European Rowing U19 Championships	Continental	Romania
1–7	Athletics	(Fiji) 2024 Oceania Athletics Championships	Continental	Australia
1–8	Small-sided Football	(Bosnia and Herzegovina) 2024 EMF EURO	Continental	Serbia
1–22	Rugby union	(Hong Kong) / (Malaysia) / (South Korea) / (United Arab Emirates) 2024 Asia Rugby Championship	Continental	Hong Kong
1–29	Cricket	(United States) / (Cricket West Indies) 2024 ICC Men's T20 World Cup	International	India
2	Motorcycle racing	(Italy) 2024 Italian motorcycle Grand Prix (MotoGP #7)	International	MotoGP: (Italy) Francesco Bagnaia ( (Italy) Ducati Lenovo Team); Moto2: (United States) Joe Roberts ( (United States) OnlyFans American Racing Team); Moto3: (Colombia) David Alonso ( (Spain) CFMoto Gaviota Aspar Team)
2–9	Road bicycle racing	(France) 2024 Critérium du Dauphiné (UCI World Tour #23)	International	(Slovenia) Primož Roglič ( (Germany) Bora–Hansgrohe)
2–9	Volleyball	(Bahrain) 2024 Asian Men's Volleyball Challenge Cup	Continental	Qatar
3–8	Pool	(Saudi Arabia) 2024 WPA World Nine-ball Championship	International	(United States) Fedor Gorst
3–9	Basketball	(Argentina) 2024 FIBA Under-18 AmeriCup	Continental	United States
5–7	Water polo	(Malta) 2024 LEN Champions League Final Four	Continental	(Hungary) FTC-Telekom
6–10	Fencing	(Morocco) 2024 African Fencing Championships	Continental	Egypt
6–12	Road bicycle racing Para-cycling	(Kazakhstan) 2024 Asian Road Cycling Championships	Continental	Kazakhstan
7–12	Athletics	(Italy) 2024 European Athletics Championships	Continental	Italy
8	Horse racing	(United States) 2024 Belmont Stakes	Domestic	Horse: (United States) Dornoch; Jockey: (Panama) Luis Saez; Trainer: (United States) Danny Gargan
8–9	Handball	(Germany) 2024 EHF Champions League Final Four	Continental	(Spain) Barça
9	Formula racing	(Canada) 2024 Canadian Grand Prix (F1 #9)	International	(Netherlands) Max Verstappen ( (Austria) Red Bull Racing-Honda RBPT)
9–16	Road bicycle racing	(Switzerland) 2024 Tour de Suisse (UCI World Tour #24)	International	Men: (United Kingdom) Adam Yates ( (United Arab Emirates) UAE Team Emirates); Women: (Netherlands) Demi Vollering ( (Netherlands) Team SD Worx–Protime)
9–16	Modern pentathlon	(China) 2024 World Modern Pentathlon Championships	International	South Korea
10–23	Aquatics	(Serbia) 2024 European Aquatics Championships	Continental	Hungary
13–16	Canoe sprint	(Hungary) 2024 Canoe Sprint European Championships	Continental	Hungary
13–16	Golf	(United States) 2024 U.S. Open	International	(United States) Bryson DeChambeau
14–14 July	Association football	(Germany) UEFA Euro 2024	Continental	Spain
15–16	Endurance racing	(France) 2024 24 Hours of Le Mans (WEC #4)	International	Hypercar: (Italy) Antonio Fuoco, (Spain) Miguel Molina & (Denmark) Nicklas Nielsen ( (Italy) Ferrari AF Corse); LMP2: (United States) Bijoy Garg, (United Kingdom) Oliver Jarvis & (United States) Nolan Siegel ( (United Kingdom) United Autosports); LMP3: (Austria) Richard Lietz, (Netherlands) Morris Schuring & (Australia) Yasser Shahin ( (Italy) Manthey EMA)
15–30	Association football	(Fiji) / (Vanuatu) 2024 OFC Men's Nations Cup	Continental	New Zealand
16–23	Volleyball	(Thailand) 2024 Asian Girls' U18 Volleyball Championship	Continental	China
17–23	Basketball	(Colombia) 2024 FIBA Under-18 Women's AmeriCup	Continental	United States
18–22	Squash	(United States) 2024 Men's PSA World Tour Finals (United States) 2024 Women's PSA World Tour Finals	International	Men: (Egypt) Ali Farag; Women: (Egypt) Nouran Gohar
18–23	Beach handball	(China) 2024 Men's Beach Handball World Championships (China) 2024 Women's Beach Handball World Championships	International	Men: Croatia; Women: Germany
18–23	Fencing	(Switzerland) 2024 European Fencing Championships	Continental	Italy
19–23	Athletics	(Cameroon) 2024 African Championships in Athletics	Continental	South Africa
19–30	Handball	(North Macedonia) 2024 Women's Junior World Handball Championship	International	France
20–23	Golf	(United States) 2024 Women's PGA Championship	International	(South Korea) Amy Yang
20–14 July	Association football	(United States) 2024 Copa América	Continental	Argentina
22–27	Fencing	(Kuwait) 2024 Asian Fencing Championships	Continental	South Korea
22–30	American football	(Canada) 2024 IFAF World Junior Championship	International	Canada
23	Formula racing	(Spain) 2024 Spanish Grand Prix (F1 #10)	International	(Netherlands) Max Verstappen ( (Austria) Red Bull Racing-Honda RBPT)
24–30	Modern pentathlon	(Egypt) 2024 World Junior Modern Pentathlon Championships	International	Egypt
24–7 July	Wrestling	(Serbia) 2024 European U17 & U20 Wrestling Championships	Continental	U17: Azerbaijan; U20: Ukraine
25–30	Basketball	(Andorra) 2024 FIBA European Championship for Small Countries (Kosovo) 2024 FIBA Women's European Championship for Small Countries	Continental	Men: Andorra; Women: Norway
25–30	Fencing	(Peru) 2024 Pan American Fencing Championships	Continental	United States
25–6 July	Association football	(Kurdistan Region) 2024 CONIFA World Football Cup	International	Postponed until 2025
26–27	Basketball	(United States) 2024 NBA draft	Domestic	(France) Zaccharie Risacher
26–7 July	Association football	(South Africa) 2024 COSAFA Cup	Regional	Angola
27–30	Darts	(Germany) 2024 PDC World Cup of Darts	International	England
27–30	Judo	(Bulgaria) 2024 European Cadet Judo Championships	Continental	Poland
27–30	Rallying	2024 Rally Poland (WRC #7)	International	WRC: (Finland) Kalle Rovanperä & (Finland) Jonne Halttunen ( (Japan) Toyota Gazoo Racing WRT); WRC-2: (Finland) Sami Pajari & (Finland) Enni Mälkönen ( (Finland) Printsport); WRC-3: (Paraguay) Diego Dominguez Jr. & (Spain) Rogelio Peñate
28–29	Ice hockey	(United States) 2024 NHL entry draft	Domestic	(Canada) Macklin Celebrini
28–2 July	Artistic swimming	(Malta) 2024 European Junior Artistic Swimming Championships	Continental	Spain
28–7 July	Badminton	(Indonesia) 2024 Badminton Asia Junior Championships	Continental	China
29	Mixed martial arts	(United States) UFC 303: Pereira vs. Procházka 2	International	(Brazil) Alex Pereira
29–30	Formula racing	(United States) 2024 Portland ePrix (FE #13 & #14)	International	Race 1: (Portugal) António Félix da Costa ( (Germany) TAG Heuer Porsche Formula E Team); Race 2: (Portugal) António Félix da Costa ( (Germany) TAG Heuer Porsche Formula E Team)
29–7 July	Basketball	(Turkey) 2024 FIBA Under-17 Basketball World Cup	International	United States
29–7 July	Rugby sevens	(Mauritius) 2024 Africa Men's Sevens	Continental	Uganda
29–19 July	Rugby union	(South Africa) 2024 World Rugby U20 Championship	International	England
29–21 July	Road bicycle racing	2024 Tour de France (UCI World Tour #25)	International	(Slovenia) Tadej Pogačar ( (United Arab Emirates) UAE Team Emirates)
30	Formula racing	(Austria) 2024 Austrian Grand Prix (F1 #11)	International	(United Kingdom) George Russell ( (Germany) Mercedes)
30	Motorcycle racing	(Netherlands) 2024 Dutch TT (MotoGP #8)	International	MotoGP: (Italy) Francesco Bagnaia ( (Italy) Ducati Lenovo Team); Moto2: (Japan) Ai Ogura ( (Spain) MT Helmets – MSi); Moto3: (Spain) Iván Ortolá ( (Spain) MT Helmets – MSi)

=== July ===
Date	Sport	Venue/Event	Status	Winner/s
1–6	Volleyball	(Italy) 2024 Women's U22 European Volleyball Championship	Continental	Italy
1–9	Volleyball	(China) 2024 Asian Women's U20 Volleyball Championship	Continental	China
1–13	Volleyball	(Greece) / (Romania) 2024 Women's U18 Volleyball European Championship	Continental	Bulgaria
1–14	Tennis	(United Kingdom) 2024 Wimbledon Championships	Domestic	Men: (Spain) Carlos Alcaraz; Women: (Czech Republic) Barbora Krejčíková
2–7	Canoe slalom	(Slovakia) 2024 World Junior and U23 Canoe Slalom Championships	International	France
2–7	Swimming	(Lithuania) 2024 European Junior Swimming Championships	Continental	Italy
2–17	Rugby union	(Scotland) 2024 World Rugby Under 20 Trophy	International	Scotland
3–12	Field hockey	(Canada) 2024 Men's Junior Pan American Championship (Canada) 2024 Women's Junior Pan American Championship	Continental	Men: Argentina; Women: Argentina
4–7	Volleyball	(China) 2024 FIVB Men's Volleyball Challenger Cup (Philippines) 2024 FIVB Women's Volleyball Challenger Cup	International	Men: China; Women: Czech Republic
4–24 August	Esports	(Saudi Arabia) 2024 Esports World Cup	International	(Saudi Arabia) Team Falcons
5–18	Association football	(Samoa) 2024 OFC U-19 Men's Championship	Continental	New Zealand
6–13	Korfball	(Turkey) 2024 IKF U21 World Korfball Championship	International	Netherlands
6–14	Basketball	(Lithuania) 2024 FIBA U20 Women's EuroBasket	Continental	France
7	Formula racing	(United Kingdom) 2024 British Grand Prix (F1 #12)	International	(United Kingdom) Lewis Hamilton ( (Germany) Mercedes)
7	Motorcycle racing	(Germany) 2024 German motorcycle Grand Prix (MotoGP #9)	International	MotoGP: (Italy) Francesco Bagnaia ( (Italy) Ducati Lenovo Team); Moto2: (Spain) Fermín Aldeguer ( (Italy) Speed Up Racing); Moto3: (Colombia) David Alonso ( (Spain) CFMoto Gaviota Aspar Team)
7–14	Road bicycle racing	(Italy) 2024 Giro d'Italia Women	International	(Italy) Elisa Longo Borghini ( (United States) Lidl–Trek)
8–14	Diving	(Poland) 2024 European Junior Diving Championships	Continental	Ukraine
8–14	Modern pentathlon	(Hungary) 2024 European Modern Pentathlon Championships	Continental	Italy
8–14	Baseball	(Germany) 2024 U-18 Baseball European Championship	Continental	Italy
9–13	Speedway	(United Kingdom) 2024 Speedway of Nations	International	(United Kingdom) Robert Lambert & Dan Bewley
9–14	Track cycling	(Germany) 2024 UEC European Track Championships (under-23 & junior)	Continental	Great Britain
9-28 August	Association Football	2024–25 UEFA Champions League qualifying	Continental	Champions Path: (Switzerland) Young Boys, (Croatia) Dinamo Zagreb, (Slovakia) Slovan Bratislava, (Serbia) Red Star Belgrade & (Czech Republic) Sparta Prague); League Path: (France) Lille & (Austria) Red Bull Salzburg
10–20	Lacrosse	(Portugal) 2024 Women's European Lacrosse Championship	Continental	England
10–21	Handball	(Slovenia) 2024 European Men's U-20 Handball Championship	Continental	Spain
10–21	Volleyball	(Bulgaria) 2024 U18 Volleyball European Championship	Continental	France
11–14	Golf	(France) 2024 Evian Championship	International	(Japan) Ayaka Furue
12–16	Orienteering	(United Kingdom) 2024 World Orienteering Championships	International	Sweden
12–21	Table tennis	(Sweden) 2023 European Youth Table Tennis Championships	Continental	Romania
13–14	Sailing	(United States) 2023–24 SailGP championship	International	Spain
13–21	Basketball	(Mexico) 2024 FIBA Under-17 Women's Basketball World Cup	International	United States
13–21	Basketball	(Poland) 2024 FIBA U20 EuroBasket	Continental	France
13–21	Darts	(England) 2024 World Matchplay	International	(England) Luke Humphries
14	Endurance racing	(Brazil) 2024 6 Hours of São Paulo (WEC #5)	International	Hypercar: (Switzerland) Sébastien Buemi, (New Zealand) Brendon Hartley & (Japan) Ryo Hirakawa ( (Japan) Toyota Gazoo Racing); LMGT3: (Austria) Klaus Bachler, (Saint Kitts and Nevis) Alex Malykhin & (Germany) Joel Sturm ( (Lithuania) Manthey PureRxcing)
14	Triathlon	(Germany) 2024 World Triathlon Mixed Relay Championships	International	Germany
14–20	Field hockey	(Spain) 2024 Men's EuroHockey U21 Championship (Spain) 2024 Women's EuroHockey U21 Championship	Continental	Men: Spain; Women: Netherlands
14–21	Volleyball	(Dominican Republic) 2024 Men's Pan-American Volleyball Cup	Continental	Canada
14–25	Handball	(Jordan) 2024 Asian Men's Junior Handball Championship	Continental	Japan
14–27	Association football	(Lithuania) 2024 UEFA Women's Under-19 Championship	Continental	Spain
15–20	Softball	(Italy) 2024 Women's Softball World Cup Finals	International	Japan
15–28	Association football	(Northern Ireland) 2024 UEFA European Under-19 Championship	Continental	Spain
16	Baseball	(United States) 2024 Major League Baseball All-Star Game	Domestic	American League
18–21	Athletics	(Slovakia) 2024 European Athletics U18 Championships	Continental	Italy
18–21	Golf	(Scotland) 2024 Open Championship	International	(United States) Xander Schauffele
18–21	Rallying	2024 Rally Latvia (WRC #8)	International	WRC: (Finland) Kalle Rovanperä & (Finland) Jonne Halttunen ( (Japan) Toyota Gazoo Racing WRT); WRC-2: (Sweden) Oliver Solberg & (United Kingdom) Elliott Edmondson ( (Germany) Toksport WRT); WRC-3: (Turkey) Kerem Kazaz & (France) Corentin Silvestre)
19–28	Cricket	(Sri Lanka) 2024 Women's Twenty20 Asia Cup	International	Sri Lanka
19–4 August	Association football	(Mexico) 2024 CONCACAF U-20 Championship	Continental	Mexico
20–21	Formula racing	(United Kingdom) 2024 London ePrix (FE #15 & #16)	International	Race 1: (Germany) Pascal Wehrlein ( (Germany) Porsche); Race 2: (United Kingdom) Oliver Rowland ( (Japan) Nissan Formula E Team)
21	Formula racing	(Hungary) 2024 Hungarian Grand Prix (F1 #13)	International	(Australia) Oscar Piastri ( (United Kingdom) McLaren-Mercedes)
23–30	Volleyball	(Indonesia) 2024 Asian Men's U20 Volleyball Championship	Continental	Iran
24–28	Canoe marathon	(Poland) 2024 Canoe Marathon European Championships	Continental	Poland
26–11 August	Multi-sport	(France) 2024 Summer Olympics	International	United States
27	Mixed martial arts	(United Kingdom) UFC 304: Edwards vs. Muhammad 2	International	(United States) Belal Muhammad
27–4 August	Basketball	(Finland) 2024 FIBA U18 EuroBasket	Continental	Germany
28	Formula racing	(Belgium) 2024 Belgian Grand Prix (F1 #14)	International	(United Kingdom) Lewis Hamilton ( (Germany) Mercedes)
28–10 August	Association football	(French Polynesia) 2024 OFC U-16 Men's Championship	Continental	New Zealand

=== August ===
Date	Sport	Venue/Event	Status	Winner/s
1–4	Rallying	2024 Rally Finland (WRC #9)	International	WRC: (France) Sébastien Ogier & (France) Vincent Landais ( (Japan) Toyota Gazoo Racing WRT); WRC-2: (Sweden) Oliver Solberg & (United Kingdom) Elliott Edmondson ( (Germany) Toksport WRT); WRC-3: (Finland) Jesse Kallio & (Finland) Ville Pynnönen
3–11	Basketball	(Portugal) 2024 FIBA U18 Women's EuroBasket	Continental	France
3–17	Air sports	(Czech Republic) 2024 FAI European Gliding Championships	Continental	Poland
4	Motorcycle racing	(United Kingdom) 2024 British motorcycle Grand Prix (MotoGP #10)	International	MotoGP: (Italy) Enea Bastianini ( (Italy) Ducati Lenovo Team); Moto2: (United Kingdom) Jake Dixon ( (Spain) CFMoto Aspar Team); Moto3: (Spain) Iván Ortolá ( (Spain) MT Helmets – MSi)
5–17	Volleyball	(Bulgaria) / (Republic of Ireland) 2024 Women's U20 Volleyball European Championship	Continental	Turkey
6–12	Tennis	(Canada) 2024 Canadian Open	International	Men: (Australia) Alexei Popyrin; Women: (United States) Jessica Pegula
6-13	Association football	2024–25 AFC Champions League Elite qualifying play-offs	Continental	West Region: (Qatar) Al-Gharafa SC; East Region: (China) Jessica Pegula
7–18	Handball	(Montenegro) 2024 European Men's U-18 Handball Championship	Continental	Sweden
9–17	Basketball	(Greece) 2024 FIBA U16 EuroBasket	Continental	France
10	Road bicycle racing	(Spain) 2024 Clásica de San Sebastián (UCI World Tour #26)	International	(Switzerland) Marc Hirschi ( (United Arab Emirates) UAE Team Emirates)
10–28 September	Rugby union	(Argentina) / (Australia) / (New Zealand) / (South Africa) 2024 Rugby Championship	International	South Africa
12–18	Road bicycle racing	2024 Tour de France Femmes	International	(Poland) Katarzyna Niewiadoma ( (Germany) Canyon//SRAM)
12–18	Road bicycle racing	(Poland) 2024 Tour de Pologne (UCI World Tour #27)	International	(Denmark) Jonas Vingegaard ( (Netherlands) Visma–Lease a Bike)
13–18	Beach volleyball	(Netherlands) 2024 European Beach Volleyball Championships	Continental	Men: Latvia; Women: Germany
13–19	Tennis	(United States) 2024 Cincinnati Open	International	Men: (Italy) Jannik Sinner; Women: Aryna Sabalenka
13–25	Athletics	(Sweden) 2024 World Masters Athletics Championships	International	United States
14	Association football	(Poland) 2024 UEFA Super Cup	Continental	(Spain) Real Madrid
14–25	Handball	(China) 2024 IHF Women's U18 Handball World Championship	International	Spain
14–25	Baseball	(United States) 2024 Little League World Series	Domestic	Florida
15–18	Canoe slalom	(Poland) 2024 European Junior and U23 Canoe Slalom Championships	Continental	France
15–1 September	Golf	(United States) 2024 FedEx Cup Playoffs	International	St. Jude Championship: (Japan) Hideki Matsuyama; BMW Championship: (United States) Keegan Bradley; Tour Championship: (United States) Scottie Scheffler
16–24	Basketball	(Hungary) 2024 FIBA U16 Women's EuroBasket	Continental	Finland
17–24	Volleyball	(Peru) 2024 FIVB Volleyball Girls' U17 World Championship	International	China
17–25	Futsal	(Solomon Islands) 2024 OFC Futsal Women's Nations Cup	Continental	New Zealand
17–25	Futsal	(Paraguay) 2024 South American U-17 Futsal Championship	Continental	Argentina
17–8 September	Road bicycle racing	(Spain) 2024 Vuelta a España (UCI World Tour #28)	International	(Slovenia) Primož Roglič ( (Germany) Red Bull–Bora–Hansgrohe)
18	Mixed martial arts	(Australia) UFC 305: du Plessis vs. Adesanya	International	(South Africa) Dricus du Plessis
18	Motorcycle racing	(Austria) 2024 Austrian motorcycle Grand Prix (MotoGP #11)	International	MotoGP: (Italy) Francesco Bagnaia ( (Italy) Ducati Lenovo Team); Moto2: (Italy) Celestino Vietti ( (Finland) Red Bull KTM Ajo); Moto3: (Colombia) David Alonso ( (Spain) CFMoto Gaviota Aspar Team)
18–25	Rowing	(Canada) 2024 World Rowing Championships	International	Romania
19–25	Wrestling	(Jordan) 2024 U17 World Wrestling Championships	International	Iran
21–24	Swimming	(Australia) 2024 Junior Pan Pacific Swimming Championships	International	United States
21–25	Track cycling	(China) 2024 UCI Junior Track Cycling World Championships	International	Great Britain
22–25	3x3 basketball	(Austria) 2024 FIBA 3x3 Europe Cup	International	Men: Austria; Women: Spain
22–25	Golf	(Scotland) 2024 Women's British Open	International	(New Zealand) Lydia Ko
22–25	Summer biathlon	(Estonia) Summer Biathlon World Championships 2024	International	Ukraine
22–31	Sport climbing	(China) 2024 IFSC Climbing World Youth Championships	International	Japan
23–25	Canoe sprint	(Uzbekistan) 2024 ICF Canoe Sprint World Championships	International	Authorised Neutral Athletes
23–21 September	Rugby union	(Canada) / (Fiji) / (Japan) / (Samoa) / (Tonga) / (United States) 2024 World Rugby Pacific Nations Cup	Regional	Fiji
24	Association football	(Brazil) 2024 Under-20 Intercontinental Cup	International	(Brazil) Flamengo
24–31	Volleyball	(Bulgaria) 2024 FIVB Volleyball Boys' U17 World Championship	International	Italy
24–31	Water polo	(Croatia) 2024 Women's European U-19 Water Polo Championship	Continental	Spain
25	Formula racing	(Netherlands) 2024 Dutch Grand Prix (F1 #15)	International	(United Kingdom) Lando Norris ( (United Kingdom) McLaren-Mercedes)
25	Road bicycle racing	2024 Bretagne Classic Ouest-France (UCI World Tour #29)	International	Men: (Switzerland) Marc Hirschi ( (United Arab Emirates) UAE Team Emirates); Women: (Netherlands) Mischa Bredewold ( (Netherlands) Team SD Worx–Protime)
26–7 September	Volleyball	(Greece) \ (Serbia) 2024 Men's U20 Volleyball European Championship	Continental	France
26–8 September	Tennis	(United States) 2024 US Open	International	Men: (Italy) Jannik Sinner; Women: Aryna Sabalenka
27–30	Flag football	(Finland) 2024 IFAF Men's Flag Football World Championship (Finland) 2024 IFAF Women's Flag Football World Championship	International	Men: United States; Women: United States
27–31	Athletics	(Peru) 2024 World Athletics U20 Championships	International	United States
27–1 September	Beach volleyball	(China) 2024 Beach Volleyball U19 World Championships	International	Men: Poland; Women: United States
27–1 September	Sport climbing	(Switzerland) 2024 IFSC Climbing European Championships	Continental	France
28–1 September	Artistic swimming	(Peru) 2024 World Aquatics Artistic Swimming Junior Championships	International	China
28–1 September	Judo	(Peru) 2024 World Judo Cadets Championships	International	Japan
28–1 September	Mountain biking	(Andorra) 2024 UCI Mountain Bike World Championships	International	France
28–1 September	Road bicycle racing	(Belgium) / (Netherlands) 2024 Renewi Tour (UCI World Tour #30)	International	(Belgium) Tim Wellens ( (United Arab Emirates) UAE Team Emirates)
28–1 September	Volleyball	(Brazil) 2024 Girls' U19 South American Volleyball Championship	Continental	Brazil
28–8 September	Multi-sport	(France) 2024 Summer Paralympics	International	China
29–5 October	Sailing	(Spain) 2024 Louis Vuitton Cup	International	(United Kingdom) INEOS Britannia
31–7 September	Basketball	(Chile) 2024 South American Women's Basketball Championship	Continental	Argentina
31–22 September	Association football	(Colombia) 2024 FIFA U-20 Women's World Cup	International	North Korea
31–14 December	American football	(United States) 2024 NCAA Division I FBS football season	Domestic	

=== September ===
Date	Sport	Venue/Event	Status	Winner/s
1	Endurance racing	(United States) 2024 Lone Star Le Mans (WEC #6)	International	Hypercar: (Poland) Robert Kubica, (Israel) Robert Shwartzman & (China) Yifei Ye ( (Italy) AF Corse); LMGT3: (United States) Ian James, (Italy) Daniel Mancinelli & (Spain) Alex Riberas ( (United States) Heart of Racing Team)
1	Formula racing	(Italy) 2024 Italian Grand Prix (F1 #16)	International	(Monaco) Charles Leclerc ( (Italy) Scuderia Ferrari)
1	Motorcycle racing	(Spain) 2024 Aragon motorcycle Grand Prix (MotoGP #12)	International	MotoGP: (Spain) Marc Márquez ( (Italy) Gresini Racing MotoGP); Moto2: (United Kingdom) Jake Dixon ( (Spain) CFMoto Inde Aspar Team); Moto3: (Spain) José Antonio Rueda ( (Finland) Red Bull KTM Ajo)
1–7	Softball	(Netherlands) 2024 Women's Softball European Championship	Continental	Italy
1–7	Water polo	(Bulgaria) 2024 Men's European U-19 Water Polo Championship	Continental	Croatia
2–8	Wrestling	(Spain) 2024 U20 World Wrestling Championships	International	Iran
2–9	Basketball	(Jordan) 2024 FIBA U18 Asia Cup	Continental	Australia
2–14	Basketball	(South Africa) 2024 FIBA U18 AfroBasket (South Africa) 2024 FIBA U18 Women's AfroBasket	Continental	Men: Mali; Women: Mali
3–14	Handball	(Jordan) 2024 Asian Men's Youth Handball Championship	Continental	Japan
5–8	Judo	(Estonia) 2024 European Junior Judo Championships	Continental	Azerbaijan
5–8	Rallying	(Greece) 2024 Acropolis Rally (WRC #10)	International	WRC: (Belgium) Thierry Neuville & (Belgium) Martijn Wydaeghe ( (South Korea) Hyundai Shell Mobis WRT); WRC-2: (Finland) Sami Pajari & (Finland) Enni Mälkönen ( (Finland) Printsport); WRC-3: (Poland) Hubert Laskowski & (Poland) Michał Kuśnierz
5–5 January 2025	American football	(United States) 2024 NFL season	Domestic	
6	Surfing	(United States) 2024 World Surf League Finals	International	Men: (Hawaii) John John Florence; Women: (United States) Caitlin Simmers
6–15	Baseball	(China) 2024 U-23 Baseball World Cup	International	Japan
6–22	Roller sports	(Italy) 2024 World Skate Games	International	Italy
7–8	Rowing	(Turkey) 2024 European Rowing U23 Championships	Continental	Romania
8	Road bicycle racing	(Germany) 2024 Hamburg Cyclassics (UCI World Tour #31)	International	(Netherlands) Olav Kooij ( (Netherlands) Visma–Lease a Bike)
8–17	Field hockey	(China) 2024 Men's Asian Champions Trophy	Continental	India
8–21	Association football	(Fiji) 2024 OFC U-16 Women's Championship	Continental	New Zealand
9–16	Handball	(Tunisia) 2024 African Men's Junior Handball Championship	Continental	Egypt
9–20	Multi-sport	(Indonesia) 2024 Pekan Olahraga Nasional	National	West Java
10–23	Chess	(Hungary) 45th Chess Olympiad	International	Open: India; Women: India
11–15	3x3 basketball	(Mongolia) 2024 FIBA 3x3 U23 World Cup	International	Men: Germany; Women: United States
11–15	Road bicycle racing	(Belgium) 2024 European Road Championships	Continental	Netherlands
12–15	Basketball	(Singapore) 2024 FIBA Intercontinental Cup	International	(Spain) Unicaja
13	Road bicycle racing	(Canada) 2024 Grand Prix Cycliste de Québec (UCI World Tour #32)	International	(Australia) Michael Matthews ( (Australia) Team Jayco–AlUla)
13–15	Coastal rowing	(Italy) 2024 World Rowing Beach Sprint Finals	International	Great Britain & United States
13–15	Golf	(United States) 2024 Solheim Cup	International	United States
14	Mixed martial arts	(United States) UFC 306: O'Malley vs. Dvalishvili	International	(Georgia (country)) Merab Dvalishvili
14–6 October	Futsal	(Uzbekistan) 2024 FIFA Futsal World Cup	International	Brazil
15	Endurance racing	(Japan) 2024 6 Hours of Fuji (WEC #7)	International	Hypercar: (France) Kévin Estre, (Germany) André Lotterer & (Belgium) Laurens Vanthoor ( (Germany) Porsche Penske Motorsport); LMGT3: (Italy) Francesco Castellacci, (Switzerland) Thomas Flohr & (Italy) Davide Rigon ( (Italy) Vista AF Corse)
15	Formula racing	2024 Azerbaijan Grand Prix (F1 #17)	International	(Australia) Oscar Piastri ( (United Kingdom) McLaren-Mercedes)
15	Road bicycle racing	(Canada) 2024 Grand Prix Cycliste de Montréal (UCI World Tour #33)	International	(Slovenia) Tadej Pogačar ( (United Arab Emirates) UAE Team Emirates)
15–22	Water polo	(China) 2024 World Aquatics Women's U18 Water Polo Championships	International	Spain
16–22	Archery	(Canada) 2024 World Field Archery Championships	International	Italy
17–21	Wheelchair handball	(Egypt) 2024 Wheelchair Handball World Championship	International	Egypt
17-30 May 2025	Association football	2024–25 UEFA Champions League	Continental	(France) Paris-Saint Germain
19–22	Canoe marathon	(Croatia) 2024 ICF Canoe Marathon World Championships	International	Hungary
19–22	Acrobatic gymnastics	(Portugal) 2024 Acrobatic Gymnastics World Championships	International	Belgium
19–26	Handball	(Tunisia) 2024 African Men's Youth Handball Championship	Continental	Egypt
19–27	Weightlifting	(Spain) 2024 World Junior Weightlifting Championships	International	United States
20–21	BMX freestyle	(Switzerland) 2024 BMX Freestyle European Championships	Continental	Great Britain
20–22	Tennis	(Germany) 2024 Laver Cup	International	Team Europe
20–29	Box lacrosse	(United States) 2024 World Lacrosse Box Championships	International	United States
20–30	Association football	(Bhutan) 2024 SAFF U-17 Championship	Regional	India
21–22	Triathlon	(France) 2024 European Triathlon Championships	Continental	France
21–29	Para-cycling	(Switzerland) 2024 UCI Para-cycling Road World Championships	International	Netherlands
22	Formula racing	2024 Singapore Grand Prix (F1 #18)	International	(United Kingdom) Lando Norris ( (United Kingdom) McLaren-Mercedes)
22	Motorcycle racing	(Italy) 2024 Emilia Romagna motorcycle Grand Prix (MotoGP #14)	International	MotoGP: (Italy) Enea Bastianini ( (Italy) Ducati Lenovo Team); Moto2: (Italy) Celestino Vietti ( (Finland) Red Bull KTM Ajo); Moto3: (Colombia) David Alonso ( (Spain) CFMoto Gaviota Aspar Team)
22	Mountain bike racing	(United States) 2024 UCI Mountain Bike Marathon World Championships	International	Men's: Denmark; Women's: Austria
22–29	Road bicycle racing	(Switzerland) 2024 UCI Road World Championships	International	Australia
22–29	Volleyball	(Thailand) 2024 Asian Women's Club Volleyball Championship	Continental	(Japan) NEC Red Rockets
23–29	Modern pentathlon	(Lithuania) 2024 World U19 Modern Pentathlon Championships	International	Egypt
26–27	Athletics	(Ecuador) 2024 South American U18 Championships in Athletics	Continental	Postponed until December 2024 in Argentina
26–29	Golf	(Canada) 2024 Presidents Cup	International	United States
26–29	Rallying	2024 Rally Chile (WRC #11)	International	WRC: (Finland) Kalle Rovanperä & (Finland) Jonne Halttunen ( (Japan) Toyota Gazoo Racing WRT); WRC-2: (Finland) Sami Pajari & (Finland) Enni Mälkönen ( (Finland) Printsport); WRC-3: (Romania) Norbert Maior & (Romania) Francesca Maria Maior
26–7 October	Shooting	(Peru) 2024 ISSF Junior World Championships	International	India
27–29	Aerobic gymnastics	(Italy) 2024 Aerobic Gymnastics World Championships	International	China
27–29	Athletics	(Colombia) 2024 South American Under-23 Championships in Athletics	Continental	Brazil
27–3 October	Handball	(Egypt) 2024 IHF Men's Club World Championship	International	(Hungary) Telekom Veszprém
28–6 October	Tennis	2024 China Open	International	Men: (Spain) Carlos Alcaraz; Women: (United States) Coco Gauff
29	Marathon	(Germany) 2024 Berlin Marathon	International	Men: (Ethiopia) Milkesa Mengesha; Women: (Ethiopia) Tigist Ketema; Men's wheelchair: (Switzerland) Marcel Hug; Women's wheelchair: (Switzerland) Catherine Debrunner
30–6 October	Archery	(Slovenia) 2024 World 3D Archery Championships	International	Italy
30–10 October	Boxing	(Kazakhstan) 2024 IBA Women's World Boxing Championships	International	Postponed until March 2025
30–13 October	Badminton	(China) 2024 BWF World Junior Championships	International	China

=== October ===
Date	Sport	Venue/Event	Status	Winner/s
1–6	Taekwondo	(South Korea) 2024 World Taekwondo Junior Championships	International	Iran
1–30	Baseball	(United States) 2024 World Series	Domestic	(California) Los Angeles Dodgers
2–6	Judo	(Tajikistan) 2024 World Judo Juniors Championships	International	Japan
2–13	Tennis	(China) 2024 Shanghai Masters	International	(Italy) Jannik Sinner
3–20	Cricket	(United Arab Emirates) 2024 ICC Women's T20 World Cup	International	New Zealand
5	Mixed martial arts	(United States) UFC 307: Pereira vs. Rountree Jr.	International	(Brazil) Alex Pereira
5–6	Gravel cycling	(Belgium) 2024 UCI Gravel World Championships	International	Men: (Netherlands) Mathieu van der Poel; Women: (Netherlands) Marianne Vos
5–6	Motocross	(United Kingdom) 2024 Motocross des Nations	International	Australia
6	Horse racing	(France) 2024 Prix de l'Arc de Triomphe	International	Horse: (United Kingdom) Bluestocking; Jockey: (Republic of Ireland) Rossa Ryan; Trainer: (United Kingdom) Ralph Beckett
7–12	Baseball5	(Hong Kong) 2024 Baseball5 World Cup	International	Cuba
7–13	Darts	(England) 2024 World Grand Prix	International	(Belgium) Mike De Decker
7–13	Table tennis	(Kazakhstan) 2024 Asian Table Tennis Championships	Continental	Men: (Japan) Tomokazu Harimoto; Women: (North Korea) Kim Kum Yong
7–13	Tennis	(China) 2024 Wuhan Open	International	Aryna Sabalenka
8–21	Boxing	(Bulgaria) 2024 European U23 Boxing Championships	Continental	Ukraine
9–13	Road cycling	(Kenya) 2024 African Road Championships	Continental	Eritrea
9–13	Karate	(Italy) 2024 World Cadet, Junior and U21 Karate Championships	International	Japan
12	Road bicycle racing	(Italy) 2024 Il Lombardia (UCI World Tour #34)	International	(Slovenia) Tadej Pogačar ( (United Arab Emirates) UAE Team Emirates)
12–19	Curling	(Scotland) 2024 World Mixed Curling Championship	International	Sweden
12–19	Table tennis	(Ethiopia) 2024 African Table Tennis Championships	Continental	Men: (Egypt) Omar Assar; Women: (Egypt) Hana Goda
12–20	Sailing	(Spain) 2024 America's Cup	International	Royal New Zealand Yacht Squadron
13	Gravel bicycle racing	(Italy) 2024 European Gravel Championships	Continental	Men: (Czech Republic) Martin Stošek; Women: (Switzerland) Sina Frei
13	Marathon	(United States) 2024 Chicago Marathon	International	Men: (Kenya) John Korir; Women: (Kenya) Ruth Chepng'etich
13–20	Table tennis	(El Salvador) 2024 Pan American Table Tennis Championships	Continental	Men: (Brazil) Hugo Calderano; Women: (Puerto Rico) Adriana Díaz
15–18	Table tennis	(New Zealand) 2024 Oceania Table Tennis Championships	Continental	Men: (Australia) Hwan Bae; Women: (Australia) Min Hyung Jee
15–20	Canoe polo	(China) 2024 ICF Canoe Polo World Championships	International	Men: Germany; Women: New Zealand
15–20	Road bicycle racing	(China) 2024 Tour of Guangxi (UCI World Tour #35)	International	(Belgium) Lennert Van Eetvelt ( (Belgium) Lotto–Dstny)
15–20	Table tennis	(Austria) 2024 European Table Tennis Championships	Continental	Men: (France) Alexis Lebrun; Women: (Austria) Sofia Polcanova
16–20	Track cycling	(Denmark) 2024 UCI Track Cycling World Championships	International	Netherlands
16–25	Beach handball	(Thailand) 2024 Asian Youth Beach Handball Championship	Continental	Men: Iran; Women: China
16 – 3 November	Association football	(Dominican Republic) 2024 FIFA U-17 Women's World Cup	International	North Korea
17–20	Triathlon; Paratriathlon	(Spain) 2024 World Triathlon Championship Finals (Spain) 2024 World Triathlon Para Championships	International	Men: (United Kingdom) Alex Yee; Women: (France) Cassandre Beaugrand; Paratriathlon: United States
17–20	Rallying	(Austria) / (Czech Republic) / (Germany) 2024 Central European Rally (WRC #12)	International	WRC: (Estonia) Ott Tänak & (Estonia) Martin Järveoja ( (South Korea) Hyundai Shell Mobis WRT); WRC-2: (Bulgaria) Nikolay Gryazin & (Authorised Neutral Athletes) Konstantin Aleksandrov ( (Belgium) DG Sport Compétition); WRC-3: (France) Mattéo Chatillon & (France) Maxence Cornuau
18–20	Artistic gymnastics	(Brazil) 2024 South American Artistic Gymnastics Championships	Continental	Brazil
19–26	Beach soccer	(Egypt) 2024 Beach Soccer Africa Cup of Nations	Continental	Senegal
20	Formula racing	2024 United States Grand Prix (F1 #19)	International	(Monaco) Charles Leclerc ( (Italy) Scuderia Ferrari)
20–3 November	Boxing	(Montenegro) 2024 IBA Youth World Boxing Championships	International	Kazakhstan
21–27	Basketball	(Ecuador) 2024 FIBA U15 South American Championship	Continental	Venezuela
21–27	Wrestling	(Albania) 2024 U23 World Wrestling Championships	International	Iran
22–26	Beach soccer	(Solomon Islands) 2024 OFC Beach Soccer Men's Nations Cup	Continental	Tahiti
22–2 November	Association football	(South Africa) 2024 COSAFA Women's Championship	Regional	Zambia
23–27	Motorsport	(Spain) 2024 FIA Motorsport Games	International	Spain
25–27	Artistic cycling Cycle ball	(Germany) 2024 UCI Indoor Cycling World Championships	International	Germany
25–31	Baseball	(United States) 2024 World Series	Domestic	(California) Los Angeles Dodgers
26	Road bicycle racing	(United Arab Emirates) 2024 UCI Cycling Esports World Championships	International	Men: (Germany) Jason Osborne; Women: (New Zealand) Mary Kate McCarthy
26	Mixed martial arts	(United Arab Emirates) UFC 308: Topuria vs. Holloway	International	(Georgia (country)) (Spain) Ilia Topuria
26–3 November	Weightlifting	(Poland) 2024 European Junior & U23 Weightlifting Championships	Continental	Armenia
27	Formula racing	2024 Mexico City Grand Prix (F1 #20)	International	(Spain) Carlos Sainz Jr. ( (Italy) Scuderia Ferrari)
27–2 November	Curling	(Canada) 2024 Pan Continental Curling Championships	International	Men：China; Women： Canada
28–31	Wrestling	(Albania) 2024 World Wrestling Championships	International	Japan
28–3 November	Tennis	(France) 2024 Paris Masters	International	(Germany) Alexander Zverev
29–2 November	Handball	(Nicaragua) 2024 South and Central American Men's Junior Handball Championship	Continental	Argentina
30–3 November	Volleyball	(Peru) 2024 Men's U21 South American Volleyball Championship	Continental	Brazil
31–3 November	Ice hockey	(China) 2025 IIHF Women's Asia Championship	Continental	Japan

=== November ===
Date	Sport	Venue/Event	Status	Winner/s
1–2	Horse racing	(United States) 2024 Breeders' Cup	International	Breeders' Cup Classic: Horse: (United States) Sierra Leone; Jockey: (France) Flavien Prat; Trainer: (United States) Chad C. Brown
1–3	Cyclo-cross	(Spain) 2024 UEC European Cyclo-cross Championships	Continental	Men: (Belgium) Thibau Nys; Women: (Netherlands) Fem van Empel
2	Endurance racing	2024 8 Hours of Bahrain (WEC #8)	International	Hypercar: (Switzerland) Sébastien Buemi, (New Zealand) Brendon Hartley & (Japan) Ryō Hirakawa ( (Japan) Toyota Gazoo Racing); LMGT3: (France) François Heriau, (United States) Simon Mann & (Italy) Alessio Rovera ( (Italy) Vista AF Corse)
2–9	Tennis	(Saudi Arabia) 2024 WTA Finals	International	(United States) Coco Gauff
3	Formula racing	(Brazil) 2024 São Paulo Grand Prix (F1 #21)	International	(Netherlands) Max Verstappen ( (Austria) Red Bull Racing-Honda RBPT)
3	Marathon	(United States) 2024 New York City Marathon	International	Men: (Netherlands) Abdi Nageeye; Women: (Kenya) Sheila Chepkirui
4–10	Amputee football	(Colombia) 2024 Women's Amputee World Cup	International	Colombia
4–10	Rhythmic gymnastics	(Chile) 2024 South American Rhythmic Gymnastics Championships	Continental	Brazil
5	Horse racing	(Australia) 2024 Melbourne Cup	International	Horse: (Australia) Knight's Choice; Jockey: (Republic of Ireland) Robbie Dolan; Trainers: (Australia) John Symons / (New Zealand) Sheila Laxon
5–9	Handball	(Nicaragua) 2024 South and Central American Men's Youth Handball Championship	Continental	Brazil
6–9	Ice hockey	(Kazakhstan) 2025 IIHF Asia Championship	Continental	Kazakhstan
6–10	Basketball	(Venezuela) 2024 FIBA U15 Women's South American Championship	Continental	Venezuela
7–10	Baseball	(United Arab Emirates) Baseball United Arab Classic	Regional	Pakistan
8–9	Speed skating	(United States) 2025 Four Continents Short Track Speed Skating Championships	International	Cancelled
8–10	Sambo	(Kazakhstan) 2024 World Sambo Championships	International	Russia
9–10	Rugby sevens	(Ghana) 2024 Africa Women's Sevens	Continental	South Africa
9–17	Darts	(England) 2024 Grand Slam of Darts	International	(England) Luke Littler
9–24	Baseball	(Japan) / (Mexico) / (Taiwan) 2024 WBSC Premier12	International	Chinese Taipei
10–17	Tennis	(Italy) 2024 ATP Finals	International	(Italy) Jannik Sinner
11–17	Snooker	(England) 2024 Champion of Champions	International	(Wales) Mark Williams
11–16	Basketball	(Australia) 2024 FIBA U15 Oceania Cup (Australia) 2024 FIBA U15 Women's Oceania Cup	Continental	Men: Australia; Women: Australia
11–20	Field hockey	(India) 2024 Women's Asian Champions Trophy	Continental	India
12–17 December	Basketball	(United States) 2024 NBA Cup	Domestic	(Wisconsin) Milwaukee Bucks
14–20	Tennis	(Spain) 2024 Billie Jean King Cup Finals	International	Italy
15–17	Judo	(Poland) 2024 European U23 Judo Championships	Continental	Georgia
15–17	Parkour	(Japan) 2024 Parkour World Championships	International	Men's Freestyle: (Sweden) Elis Torhall; Men's Speed: (Switzerland) Caryl Cordt-Moller; Women's Freestyle: (China) Shang Chunsong; Women's Speed: (Mexico) Ella Bucio
15–17	Speed skating	(Japan) 2025 Four Continents Speed Skating Championships	International	United States
16	Mixed martial arts	(United States) UFC 309: Jones vs. Miocic	International	(United States) Jon Jones
16–23	Curling	(Finland) / (Sweden) 2024 European Curling Championships (A & B Divisions)	Continental	Men: Germany; Women: Switzerland
19–24	Tennis	(Spain) 2024 Davis Cup Finals	International	Italy
20–23	Taekwondo	(Bosnia and Herzegovina) 2024 European U21 Taekwondo Championships	Continental	Turkey
20–25	Water polo	(Colombia) 2024 Pan American Water Polo Championships	Continental	Men: Brazil; Women: United States
21–24	Rallying	2024 Rally Japan (WRC #13)	International	WRC: (United Kingdom) Elfyn Evans & (United Kingdom) Scott Martin ( (Japan) Toyota Gazoo Racing WRT); WRC-2: (Bulgaria) Nikolay Gryazin & (Authorised Neutral Athletes) Konstantin Aleksandrov; WRC-3: (Paraguay) Diego Dominguez Jr. & (Spain) Rogelio Peñate
21–30	Multi-sport	(Thailand) 2021 Asian Indoor and Martial Arts Games	Continental	Cancelled
22–24	Aesthetic group gymnastics	(Estonia) 2024 World Aesthetic Group Gymnastics Championships	International	Finland
22–29	Table tennis	(Sweden) 2024 ITTF World Youth Championships	International	China
23	Association football	(Paraguay) 2024 Copa Sudamericana Final	Continental	(Argentina) Racing
23	Formula racing	(United States) 2024 Las Vegas Grand Prix (F1 #22)	International	(United Kingdom) George Russell ( (Germany) Mercedes)
23–1 December	Snooker	(England) 2024 UK Championship (Triple Crown #1)	International	(England) Judd Trump
23–12 December	Chess	(Singapore) World Chess Championship 2024	International	(India) Gukesh Dommaraju
24	Canadian football	(Canada) 111th Grey Cup	Domestic	(Ontario) Toronto Argonauts
24–1 December	Diving	(Brazil) 2024 World Aquatics Junior Diving Championships	International	Mexico
26–30	Handball	(Brazil) 2024 South and Central American Women's Handball Championship	Continental	Brazil
26–4 December	Field hockey	(Oman) 2024 Men's Hockey Junior Asia Cup	Continental	India
26–5 December	Badminton	(Spain) 2024 European Junior Badminton Championships	Continental	France
27–7 December	Handball	(Democratic Republic of the Congo) 2024 African Women's Handball Championship	Continental	Angola
28–8 December	Multi-sport event	(Peru) 2024 Bolivarian Games	Regional	Peru
28–15 December	Handball	(Austria) / (Hungary) / (Switzerland) 2024 European Women's Handball Championship	Continental	Norway
29–1 December	3x3 basketball	(Madagascar) 2024 FIBA 3x3 Africa Cup	Continental	Men: Madagascar; Women: Madagascar
29–1 December	Rugby league	(Argentina) 2024 South American Rugby League Championship	Continental	Chile
29–8 December	Cricket	(United Arab Emirates) 2024 ACC Under-19 Asia Cup	Continental	Bangladesh
29–8 December	Darts	(England) 2024 WDF World Darts Championship	International	Men: (Republic of Ireland) Shane McGuirk; Women: (England) Beau Greaves
30	Association football	(Argentina) 2024 Copa Libertadores Final	Continental	(Brazil) Botafogo
30–1 December	Motorcycle racing	(Spain) 2024 FIM Intercontinental Games	Continental	(European Union) Team Europe
30–8 December	Field hockey	(Namibia) 2024 Men's Hockey Junior Africa Cup (Namibia) 2024 Women's Hockey Junior Africa Cup	Continental	Postponed until April 2025
30–11 December	Amateur boxing	(Thailand) 2024 Asian Amateur Boxing Championships	Continental	Uzbekistan

=== December ===
Date	Sport	Venue/Event	Status	Winner/s
1	Formula racing	2024 Qatar Grand Prix (F1 #23)	International	(Netherlands) Max Verstappen ( (Austria) Red Bull Racing-Honda RBPT)
1–8	Table tennis	(China) 2024 ITTF Mixed Team World Cup	International	China
3–9	Rhythmic gymnastics	(Brazil) 2024 Junior South American Rhythmic Gymnastics Championships	Continental	Brazil
3–10	Handball	(India) 2024 Asian Women's Handball Championship	Continental	Japan
4–7	Beach volleyball	(Qatar) 2024 Volleyball World Beach Pro Tour Finals	International	Men: (Norway) Anders Mol / Christian Sørum; Women: (United States) Kristen Nuss / Taryn Kloth
4–8	Teqball	(Vietnam) 2024 Teqball World Championships	International	Thailand
5–8	Figure skating	(France) 2024–25 Grand Prix of Figure Skating Final	International	United States
6–15	Basketball	(Senegal) 2024 Women's Basketball League Africa	Continental	(Mozambique) Ferroviário de Maputo
6–15	Weightlifting	(Bahrain) 2024 World Weightlifting Championships	International	North Korea
7	Formula racing	(Brazil) 2024 São Paulo ePrix (FE #1)	International	(New Zealand) Mitch Evans ( (United Kingdom) Jaguar TCS Racing)
7	Mixed martial arts	(United States) UFC 310: Pantoja vs. Asakura	International	(Brazil) Alexandre Pantoja
7–8	Rugby sevens	(Solomon Islands) 2024 Oceania Sevens Championship	Continental	Samoa
7–15	Field hockey	(Oman) 2024 Women's Hockey Junior Asia Cup	Continental	India
7–15	Floorball	(Sweden) 2024 Men's World Floorball Championships	International	Finland
8	Athletics	(Turkey) 2024 European Cross Country Championships	Continental	Great Britain
8	Formula racing	(United Arab Emirates) 2024 Abu Dhabi Grand Prix (F1 #24)	International	(United Kingdom) Lando Norris ( (United Kingdom) McLaren-Mercedes)
9–15	Squash	(Hong Kong) 2024 Men's World Team Squash Championships (Hong Kong) 2024 Women's World Team Squash Championships	International	Men: Egypt; Women: Egypt
10	Taekwondo	(China) 2024 World Cup Taekwondo Team Championships	International	Brazil
10–15	Swimming	(Hungary) 2024 World Aquatics Swimming Championships (25 m)	International	United States
10–15	Volleyball	(Brazil) 2024 FIVB Volleyball Men's Club World Championship	International	(Brazil) Sada Cruzeiro
11–15	Badminton	(China) 2024 BWF World Tour Finals	International	Men: (China) Shi Yuqi; Women: (China) Wang Zhiyi
13–15	3x3 basketball	(Puerto Rico) 2024 FIBA 3x3 AmeriCup	Continental	Men: United States; Women: Canada
15–22	Cricket	(Malaysia) 2024 ACC Under-19 Women's T20 Asia Cup	Continental	India
15–3 January 2025	Darts	(England) 2025 PDC World Darts Championship	International	(England) Luke Littler
17–22	Cycling	(United Arab Emirates) 2024 UCI Urban Cycling World Championships	International	Spain
17–22	Volleyball	(China) 2024 FIVB Volleyball Women's Club World Championship	International	(Italy) Prosecco Doc Imoco Conegliano
18	Association football	(Qatar) 2024 FIFA Intercontinental Cup final	International	(Spain) Real Madrid
18–22	Tennis	(Saudi Arabia) 2024 Next Generation ATP Finals	International	(Brazil) João Fonseca
19–25	Weightlifting	(Qatar) 2024 Asian Youth & Junior Weightlifting Championships	Continental	Vietnam
21–4 January 2025	Association football	(Kuwait) 26th Arabian Gulf Cup	Regional	Bahrain
26–28	Chess	(United States) World Rapid Chess Championship 2024	International	Open: (FIDE) Volodar Murzin; Women: (India) Koneru Humpy
26–5 January 2025	Ice hockey	(Canada) 2025 World Junior Ice Hockey Championships	International	United States
27–5 January 2025	Tennis	(Australia) 2025 United Cup	International	United States
28–5 January 2025	Cross-country skiing	(Italy) 2024–25 Tour de Ski	International	Men: (Norway) Johannes Høsflot Klæbo; Women: (Norway) Therese Johaug
29–6 January 2025	Ski jumping	(Germany) / (Austria) 2024–25 Four Hills Tournament	International	(Austria) Daniel Tschofenig
30–31	Chess	(United States) World Blitz Chess Championship 2024	International	Open: (Norway) Magnus Carlsen & (FIDE) Ian Nepomniachtchi; Women: (China) Ju Wenjun

== Multi-sport events ==
- January 11-21: 2024 World Winter Masters Games in Lombardy, Italy
- January 19–February 1: 2024 Winter Youth Olympics in Gangwon, South Korea
- February 2-18:: 2024 World Aquatics Championships in Doha, Qatar
- February 21–March 3: 2024 Games of the Future in Kazan, Russia
- March 02–12: 2024 Winter Deaflympics in Erzurum, Turkey
- March 3-8: 2024 Winter Transplant Games in Bormio, Italy
- March 8-23: 2023 African Games in Accra, Ghana
- March 19–26: 2024 World Trisome Games in Antalya, Turkey
- April 4-14: 2024 Bolivarian Youth Games in Sucre, Bolivia
- June 12-23: 2024 BRICS Games in Kazan, Russia
- June 16-23: 2024 World Medi Games in Saint-Tropez, France
- June 19-23: 2024 World Company Games in Catania, Italy
- June 26-July 7: 8th Children of Asia International Sports Games in Yakutsk, Russia
- July 26–August 11: 2024 Summer Olympics in Paris, France
- August 28–September 8: 2024 Summer Paralympics in Paris, France
- September 6–22: 2024 World Skate Games in Rome and Pescara, Italy
- September 7-14: 2024 World Firefighters Games in Aalborg, Denmark
- September 8-13: 2024 World Nomad Games in Astana, Kazakhstan
- September 9-20: 2024 Pekan Olahraga Nasional in North Sumatra and Aceh, Indonesia
- October 23-27: 2024 FIA Motorsport Games in Valencia, Spain
- October 23-31: 2024 World School Sport Games in Manama, Bahrain
- November 28-December 8: 2024 Bolivarian Games in Ayacucho, Peru
- November 30-December 1: 2024 FIM Intercontinental Games in Jerez, Spain
- December 1-8: 2024 Asia Pacific Deaf Games in Kuala Lumpur, Malaysia
- (Russia) 2024 World Friendship Games Postponed to 2025
- (Thailand) 2021 Asian Indoor and Martial Arts Games (Cancelled)
- 2024 National Games of India Postponed to 2025
- (Pakistan) 2024 South Asian Games Postponed to 2025
- 2024 Islamic University Games
- 2024 Nawruz Games

== Association football ==
=== Indoor soccer ===
- EMF calendar 2024 here

==== EMF competitions ====
- June 1–9: 2024 EMF EURO in (Bosnia and Herzegovina) Sarajevo
- September 5–8: 2024 EMF Champions League in (Poland) Warsaw
- September 18–21: 2024 EMF Eurocup in (Bulgaria) Sunny Beach
- September 20–22: 2024 EMF Masters Champions League in (Bulgaria) Sunny Beach
- October 16–20: 2024 EURO Business Cup in (Turkey) Antalya

=== Freestyle football ===
- WFFA Events Calendar here

==== Major competitions ====
- August 18–25: Super Ball World Open 2024 in (Czech Republic) Liberec
- August 18–25: IFPA Footbag Freestyle World Championships 2024 in (Czech Republic) Liberec

==== Meets ====
- February 15–18: Sorø Meet 2024 in (Denmark) Vejle
- March 21–23: Jeux Urbains Montréal 2024 in (Canada) Montreal
- May 1: Freestyle Meet Angers 2024 in (France) Angers

==== Open tournaments ====
- January 6: Masters of Movement Amsterdam 2024 in (Netherlands) Amsterdam
- January 13–14: Villa de Mayo Open Tournament 2024 in (Argentina) Palombara Sabina
  - Winner: (Argentina) Nico Gondra
- January 20–21: All-Star Open Championship Palombara 2024 in (Italy) Palombara
- April 20–21: Naostyle Cup 2024 in (France) Angers
- April 20: Extreme Dominance of Freestyle Football Lima 2024 in (Peru) Lima
- May 18–19: Roma International Freestyle Cup 2024 in (Italy) Rome
- May 24–25: Genova 2024 Freestyle Football Contest in (Italy) Genoa
- June 15: Freestyler Football Cup Nanterre 2024 in (France) Nanterre

==== 2024 Pulse Series ====
- June 6–7: Pulse Series in (Poland) Sopot
- July 13: Pulse Series in (Nigeria) Lagos
- July 27–28: Pulse Series in Mexico City
- September: Pulse Series in (Argentina) Córdoba
- October: Pulse Series in (Indonesia) Jakarta

== Australian football ==
=== Australian Football League ===
- March 7 – September 28: 2024 AFL season

== Baseball & softball ==
=== WBSC ===
- July 15–21: 2024 Women's Softball World Cup Finals in (Italy) Buttrio and Castions di Strada
- October 7-12: 2024 Baseball5 World Cup

=== Major League Baseball ===
- March 28 – September 29: 2024 Major League Baseball season
- July 14: 2024 Major League Baseball draft in Arlington, Texas
- July 16: 2024 Major League Baseball All-Star Game at Globe Life Field in Arlington, Texas
- October 25 – October 30: 2024 World Series
  - The (California) Los Angeles Dodgers defeat (New York (state)) New York Yankees, 4–1 in games played, to win their eighth World Series title.

=== 2024 Little League World Series ===
- August 15–25: Little League World Series at both Little League Volunteer Stadium and Howard J. Lamade Stadium in (Pennsylvania) South Williamsport

== Basketball & 3x3 ==
- June 29 – July 7: 2024 FIBA Under-17 Basketball World Cup in Turkey
- July 13–21: 2024 FIBA Under-17 Women's Basketball World Cup in Mexico
- September 11–15: 2024 FIBA 3x3 U23 World Cup in Mongolia

=== FIBA Asia ===
- March 27–31: 2024 FIBA 3x3 Asia Cup in Singapore
- June 24–30: 2024 FIBA U18 Women's Asia Cup in China

=== FIBA Europe ===
- July 6–14: 2024 FIBA U20 Women's EuroBasket in Lithuania
- July 13–21: 2024 FIBA U20 EuroBasket in Poland
- July 27 – August 4: 2024 FIBA U18 EuroBasket in Finland
- August 3–11: 2024 FIBA U18 Women's EuroBasket in Portugal
- August 9–17: 2024 FIBA U16 EuroBasket in Greece
- August 22–25: 2024 FIBA 3x3 Europe Cup in Austria

=== National Basketball Association ===
- October 24, 2023 – April 14: 2023–24 NBA season
- February 18: 2024 NBA All-Star Game in Indianapolis, Indiana
- April 20 – June 17: 2024 NBA playoffs
  - (Massachusetts) Boston Celtics defeated (Texas) Dallas Mavericks, 4–1 in games played
- June 26–27: 2024 NBA draft in (New York (state)) New York City, New York
- October 22 – April 13, 2025: 2024–25 NBA season
- November 12 – December 17: 2024 NBA Cup
  - (Wisconsin) Milwaukee Bucks defeated Oklahoma City Thunder, 97–81

=== National Collegiate Athletic Association ===
- March 19 – April 8: 2024 NCAA Division I men's basketball tournament
- March 20 – April 7: 2024 NCAA Division I women's basketball tournament

== Cue sports ==
=== Snooker ===
Triple Crown

- November 25 – December 3, 2023: 2023 UK Championship in (England) York
  - Winner: (England) Ronnie O'Sullivan
- January 7–14: 2024 Masters (snooker) in (England) London
  - Winner: (England) Ronnie O'Sullivan
- April 20 – May 6: 2024 World Snooker Championship in (England) Sheffield
  - Winner: (England) Kyren Wilson

Players Series

- January 15–21: 2024 World Grand Prix in (England) Leicester
  - Winner: (England) Ronnie O'Sullivan
- February 19–25: 2024 Players Championship in (England) Telford
  - Winner: (Northern Ireland) Mark Allen
- April 1–7: 2024 Tour Championship in (England) Manchester
  - Winner: (Wales) Mark Williams

Amateur snooker

- January 29 - February 11: 2024 WSF Championships in (Albania) Golem
  - Winner: (Hong Kong) Cheung Ka Wai
  - U19 winner: (Hungary) Bulcsú Révész

== Dodgeball ==
=== World championships ===
- August 11–17: 2024 World Dodgeball Championships in (Austria) Graz

=== Club competitions ===
- April 20 – November 17: Major League Dodgeball in Australia
- January – May: British Dodgeball National Dodgeball Leagues in United Kingdom
- July 6: 2024 British Dodgeball Championships in United Kingdom
- February – September: USA Dodgeball Premier Tour in United States

== Fistball ==
=== 2024 IFA World Tour ===
Major

- March 16–17: Major in (Brazil) Novo Hamburgo
  - Winners: (Brazil) Ginastica Novo Hamburgo (m) / (Brazil) Sogipa Porto Alegre (w)
- March 22–24: Major in (Brazil) Porto Alegre
- July 18–21: 2024 IFA World Tour Final in Germany

== Gaelic football ==
=== All-Ireland Senior Football Championship ===
- April – July: 2024 All-Ireland Senior Football Championship

=== National Football League (Ireland) ===
- January – April: 2024 National Football League (Ireland)

== Golf ==
=== Men's major golf championships (PGA Tour) ===
- April 11–14: 2024 Masters Tournament at Augusta National Golf Club in Augusta, Georgia – (United States) Scottie Scheffler
- May 13–19: 2024 PGA Championship at Valhalla Golf Club in Louisville Kentucky – (United States) Xander Schauffele
- June 13–16: 2024 U.S. Open at Pinehurst Resort in Pinehurst, North Carolina – (United States) Bryson DeChambeau
- July 17–21: 2024 Open Championship at Royal Troon Golf Club in Troon, Scotland – (United States) Xander Schauffele

=== Women's major golf championships (LPGA Tour) ===
- April 18–21: 2024 Chevron Championship at The Club at Carlton Woods in The Woodlands, Texas – (United States) Nelly Korda
- May 30 – June 2: 2024 U.S. Women's Open at Lancaster Country Club in Lancaster, Pennsylvania – (Japan) Yuka Saso
- June 20–23: 2024 Women's PGA Championship in Sahalee Country Club in Sammamish, Washington – (South Korea) Amy Yang
- July 11–14: 2024 Evian Championship in Evian Resort Golf Club in Évian-les-Bains, France – (Japan) Ayaka Furue
- August 21–25: 2024 Women's British Open at Old Course at St Andrews in St Andrews, Scotland – (New Zealand) Lydia Ko

=== Senior major golf championships (PGA Tour Champions) ===
- May 9–12: The Tradition at Greystone Golf & Country Club in Birmingham, Alabama – (United States) Doug Barron
- May 25–28: Senior PGA Championship at The Golf Club at Harbor Shores in Benton Harbor, Michigan – (England) Richard Bland
- June 27–30: U.S. Senior Open at Newport Country Club in Newport, Rhode Island – (England) Richard Bland
- July 12–14: Kaulig Companies Championship at Firestone Country Club in Akron, Ohio – (South Africa) Ernie Els
- July 25–28: Senior Open Championship at Carnoustie Golf Links at Carnoustie, Scotland – (South Korea) K. J. Choi

== Gridiron football ==
=== Canadian football ===
==== Canadian Football League ====
- April 30: 2024 CFL draft and 2024 CFL global draft in (Ontario) Toronto
- June 6 – November 9: 2024 CFL season
- November 17: 111th Grey Cup in (British Columbia) Vancouver

==== U Sports ====
- August 23 – November 16: 2024 U Sports football season
- November 23: 59th Vanier Cup in (Ontario) Kingston

== Hockey ==
=== Floorball ===
- January 26–27: Champions Cup finals
  - Men's champion: (Czech Republic) Tatran Střešovice
  - Women's champion: (Sweden) Thorengruppen IBK
- May 8–12: 2024 Women's U-19 World Floorball Championships in Finland
  - Champion: Sweden
- December 7–15: 2024 Men's World Floorball Championships in Sweden
  - Champion: Finland

=== Inline hockey ===
World & continental championships

- August 29 – September 22: 2024 Inline World Hockey Championships in (Italy) Roccaraso

== Hurling ==
=== All-Ireland Senior Hurling Championship ===
- April – July: 2024 All-Ireland Senior Hurling Championship

=== National Hurling League ===
- February 3 – April 6/7: 2024 National Hurling League

== Lacrosse ==
=== National Lacrosse League ===
- December 1, 2023 – June 2024: 2024 NLL season

== Minigolf ==
- June 7–9: 2024 World Crazy Golf Championships in (England) Hastings

== Netball ==
International tournaments

Date	Tournament	Winners	Runners up
20–28 January	2024 Netball Nations Cup	Australia	England
16–23 March	2025 Netball World Youth Cup qualification – Africa	South Africa	Malawi
10–15 June	2024 Pacific Netball Series	Tonga	Fiji
19–22 September	2024 Australia England netball series	Australia	England
22–29 September	2024 ECCB International Netball Series	Saint Vincent and the Grenadines	Grenada
29 Sept–6 Oct	2024 Taini Jamison Trophy Series	England	New Zealand
20–30 October	2024 Constellation Cup	New Zealand	Australia
18–27 October	2024 Asian Netball Championships	Singapore	Sri Lanka
7–10 November	2024 Celtic Cup	Wales	Scotland
9–10 November	2024 Fast5 Netball World Series	Australia	New Zealand
9–10 November	2024 Men's Fast5 Netball World Series	Australia	New Zealand

Major national leagues

Host	League	Winners	Runners up
Australia	Suncorp Super Netball	Adelaide Thunderbirds	Melbourne Vixens
New Zealand	ANZ Premiership	Northern Mystics	Central Pulse
United Kingdom	Netball Superleague	Loughborough Lightning	Manchester Thunder

== Para-sports ==
=== Football ===
==== Amputee football ====
Continental championships

- April 18–26: African Amputee Football Nations Cup 2024 in (Egypt) Cairo
- May 31 – June 9: 2024 European Amputee Football Championship in (France) Haute-Savoie

== Roller skating ==
=== World & continental championships ===
- 13 – 21 September: 2024 Inline Speed Skating World Championships in (Italy) Montesilvano / Sulmona – Pescara

== Sepak takraw ==
=== International tournaments ===
- May 18–26: 2024 ISTAF World Cup in (Malaysia) Kuala Lumpur
- TBD: 2024 King's Cup Sepaktakraw World Championship in Thailand

== Skateboarding ==
=== Major championships ===
- July 27 – August 7: 2024 Summer Olympics in (France) Paris
- September 3–21: 2024 Skateboarding World Championships in Italy

=== 2024 WST Pro Tour ===
- March 3–10: 2024 WST Pro Tour Dubai in (United Arab Emirates) Dubai
  - Park winners: (Spain) Danny León (m) / (Spain) Naia Laso (w)
  - Street winners: (Japan) Kairi Netsuke (m) / (Japan) Liz Akama (w)

== Sport stacking ==
- WSSA tournaments calendar here

=== Marquee events ===
- March 27–29: 2024 World Sport Stacking Championships in (United States) Orlando
  - All-around winners: (United States) William Orrell (m) / (South Korea) Park Min-hyeong (f)
  - 3–3–3 winners: (Malaysia) Chan Keng Ian (m) / (Malaysia) Woo Xin Yi (f)
  - 3–6–3 winners: (Malaysia) Chan Keng Ian (m) / (South Korea) Kim Si-eun (f)
  - Cycle winners: (United States) William Orrell (m) / (South Korea) Kim Si-eun (f)
  - Doubles Overall Cycle winners: (Netherlands) Liam van der Ree (m) & (Republic of Ireland) Adam Turner
  - 3–6–3 Relay winners: (United States) with the answer (William Orrell, Dalton Nichols, William Allen, Tyler Hollis, William Polly)
- July 26–28: 2024 AAU Junior Olympic Games Sport Stacking Championships in (United States) Greensboro
- November 29 – December 1: 2024 Asian Open Sport Stacking Championships in (Malaysia) Kuala Lumpur

== Swimrun ==
=== World Championships ===
- September 2: 2024 ÖTILLÖ Swimrun World Championships in (Sweden) Sandhamn

=== 2024 ÖTILLÖ Merit races ===
- April 13: Swimrun New Caledonia in Yaté
- April 28: Swimrun Gorges du Verdon in France
- June 2: Tamega Swimrun in Portugal
- June 15: Swimrun Côte Vermeille in France
- August 17: Västerås Swimrun in Sweden
- August 25: Swimrun Grands Lacs de Laffrey in France
- September 22: Swimrun Coniston in United Kingdom

=== 2024 other swimrun races ===
- June 8: Swimrun Utö in (Sweden) Utö
- June 29: Swimrun Engadin in (Switzerland) Engadin
- July 7: Swimrun Whistler in (Canada) Whistler
- August 3: Swimrun Gothenburg in (Sweden) Gothenburg
- August 11: Swimrun Casco Bay in (United States) Casco Bay
- August 25: Swimrun Mackinac in (United States) Mackinac
- August 31: Final 15k Sweden in Utö
- September 15: Swimrun Orcas Island in (United States) Orcas Island
- October 12: Swimrun Cannes in (France) Cannes
- November 3: Swimrun Austin in (United States) Austin

== Tchoukball ==
=== 2024 Continental Tchoukball Championships ===
- TBD: 2024 Asia-Pacific Tchoukball Championships in TBD
- TBD: 2024 European Tchoukball Championships in Italy
- TBD: 2024 Pan-American Tchoukball Championships in TBD
- TBD: 2024 African Tchoukball Championships in TBD

== Tennis & Beach tennis ==
=== Beach tennis ===
- Full 2024 ITF Beach Tennis World Tour Calendar here.

==== 2024 ITF Beach Tennis World Tour ====
Sand Series

- April 8–: SS #1 in (Brazil) Ribeirão Preto
- May 6–: SS #2 in (France) Saint-Gilles
- May 3–: SS #3 in (Spain) Las Palmas
- June 10–: SS #4 in (Brazil) Brasília
- August 12–: SS #5 in (Germany) Saarlouis
- October 7–: SS #6 in (Brazil) São Paulo
- November 11–: SS #7 in (Aruba) Oranjestad
- December 9–: SS Finals #8 in TBC

== Teqball ==
- Teqball International Events here

=== 2024 Teqball World Series ===
- May 23: Teqball World Series in (Spain) Madrid
- June 7: Teqball World Series in (Vietnam) Quy Nhon
- June 14: Teqball World Series in (United States) Tulsa
- July 19: Teqball World Series in (China) Qingdao

=== 2024 Teqball Tour ===
- June 21: Teqball Tour in (Denmark) Grindsted

=== 2024 Teqball Challenger ===
- April 5: Belgian International Teqball Open in (Belgium) Wavre
  - Singles winners: (Romania) Apor Györgydeák (m) / (Romania) Kinga Barabási (w)
  - Doubles winners: (Romania) Apor Györgydeák & (Hungary) Ádám Blázsovics (m) / (Hungary) Petra Péchy & (Hungary) Nóra Vicsek (w)
  - Mixed Doubles winners: (Hungary) Krisztina Ács & (Hungary) Csaba Bányik
- April 13: OSiR Kobyłka Teqball Cup in (Poland) Kobyłka
  - Men's Singles winner: (Poland) Marek Pokwap
- April 20: Regional Tour 24 - Stage 2 - Coruche in (Portugal) Coruche
  - Men's Singles winner: (Ukraine) Dmytro Shevchuk
- May 11: OSiR Kobyłka Teqball Cup II in (Poland) Kobyłka
- May 18: Lithuanian Teqball Open - 1st stage in (Lithuania) Vilnius
- June 1: OSiR Kobyłka Teqball Cup III in (Poland) Kobyłka
- June 14: PODOBEACH TEQBALL PRO International Tournament in (Austria) Podersdorf

== University sports ==
FISU - FISU World University Championships

1. January 12–16: FISU World University Championships Ski Orienteering in (Switzerland) Lenzerheide
2. February 17–18: FISU World University Championships Cross Country in (Oman) Muscat
3. February 22–25 FISU World University Championships Speed Skating in (Norway) Hamar
4. April 26–27: FISU World University Championships Finswimming in (Colombia) Pereira
5. May 29 – June 2: FISU World University Championships Cycling in (Costa Rica) San Carlos
6. June 6–10: FISU World University Championships Sailing in (Italy) Desenzano del Garda
7. June 10–12: FISU World University Championships Rugby Sevens in (France) Aix-en-Provence
8. June 10–16: FISU World University Championships Futsal in (China) Shanghai
9. June 24–30: FISU World University Championships Handball in (Spain) Antequera
10. June 25–30: FISU World University Championships Mind Sports in (Uganda) Entebbe
11. July 4–6: FISU World University Championships Rowing in Netherlands
12. July 23–27: FISU World University Championships Powerlifting in (Estonia) Tartu
13. August 1–5: FISU World University Championships Orienteering in (Bulgaria) Bansko
14. August 2–4: FISU World University Championships Cheerleading in (Croatia) Split
15. August 21–24: FISU World University Championships Canoe Sprint in (Portugal) Montemor-o-Velho
16. August 21–25: FISU World University Championships Modern Pentathlon in (Lithuania) Kaunas
17. August 27–30: FISU World University Championships Golf in (Finland) Kuortane
18. August 30–31: FISU World University Championships Triathlon in (Poland) Gdańsk
19. September 2–8: FISU World University Championships Beach Sports in (Brazil) Rio de Janeiro
20. September 2–8: FISU World University Championships Squash in (South Africa) Johannesburg
21. September 9–12: FISU World University Championships Sport Climbing in (Slovenia) Koper
22. October 5–9: FISU World University Championships Shooting Sport in (India) New Delhi

=== Others ===
1. International Day of University Sport (IDUS) 2024 IDUS 2024 20 September 2024

== World Chase Tag ==
=== World Championship Series ===
- April 26–28: WCT 6 World Championship in (France) Évry

== Yo-yo ==
=== World Yo-Yo Contest ===
- July 31 – August 3: 2024 World Yo-Yo Contest in (United States) Cleveland
