= 2024 ECCB International Netball Series =

International netball series hosted by Saint Lucia

Tournament details
- Host country: Saint Lucia
- City: Castries
- Venue: Beausejour Indoor Facility
- Dates: 22–29 September
- Teams: 8
- TV partner: YouTube

Final positions
- Champions: Saint Vincent and the Grenadines (2nd title)
- Runners-up: Grenada
- Third place: Saint Lucia

Tournament statistics
- Matches played: 28

The 2024 ECCB International Netball Series, also known as the 2024 OECS International Netball Series, was the fourth ECCB International Netball Series. It was organised by the Caribbean Netball Association. Seven national netball teams/Eastern Caribbean Central Bank members, including the hosts, Saint Lucia, played a series of netball test matches in September 2024 at Castries' Beausejour Indoor Facility. They were also joined by guest team Cayman Islands. Saint Vincent and the Grenadines won the Gloria Ballantyne Championship Trophy while Grenada finished as runners up. The hosts, Saint Lucia, finished third. The series was streamed live on the ECCB's YouTube channel.

== Teams, head coaches and captains ==
Seven teams from Eastern Caribbean Central Bank member countries — Anguilla, Antigua and Barbuda, the Commonwealth of Dominica, Grenada, Montserrat, Saint Lucia and Saint Vincent and the Grenadines — competed for the Gloria Ballantyne Championship Trophy. Guest team, Cayman Islands competed for World Netball Rankings points.

Team	Head coach	Captain
Anguilla		
Antigua and Barbuda	Sanchez Martin	
Cayman Islands	Lyneth Monteith ?	Katherine Gow
Dominica		
Grenada		
Montserrat		
Saint Lucia	Connie Francis	Safiya Paul
Saint Vincent and the Grenadines	Natasha Baptiste	Kimesha Antoine

== Matches ==
=== Round 1 ===
Sunday, 22 September 2024	Saint Lucia	66–9	Montserrat
15:30	Dasha Eugene 12/14 (86%); Samaj Margeurite 10/11 (91%); Melika Destang; Shem Maxwell

Sunday, 22 September 2024	Antigua and Barbuda	39–37	Grenada
17:00	Rayana Regis 32/36 (89%); Amey Lake 7/10 (70%)		Celina Brown 26/33 (79%); Brittany Jones 8/12 (67%) ?? 3

Sunday, 22 September 2024	Cayman Islands	90–14	Anguilla
18:30

Sunday, 22 September 2024	Saint Vincent and the Grenadines	71–32	Dominica
20:00

=== Round 2 ===
Monday, 23 September 2024	Grenada	47–36	Cayman Islands
15:30	Amy Nixon 19/21 (90%); Carlene Alexander 17/19 (89%); Celina Brown 11/15 (73%)		Kay Copeland 28/33 (85%); Rose Wilson 8/16 (50%)

Monday, 23 September 2024	Saint Vincent and the Grenadines	87–8	Anguilla
17:00	Mary-Ann Frederick 49/50 (98%); Jamarah Coombs 20/28 (71%); Shellisa Davis 10/16 (63%); Kristiana Christopher 8/9 (89%)		Zoey Roach 8/8 (100%)

Monday, 23 September 2024	Dominica	58–16	Montserrat
18:30	Galeine Gordon-Seraphine 30/34 (88%); Anna-Maria Panthier 22/25 (88%) ?? 6		Juana Osborne 13/36 (36%) ?? 3

Monday, 23 September 2024	Saint Lucia	55–38	Antigua and Barbuda
20:00	Merlessa Alfred 28/35 (80%); Deaha Eugene 21/28 (75%); Samaj Margeurite 3/3 (100%); Shem Maxwell 3/3 (100%)		Rayana Regis 34/35 (97%); Amey Lake 3/6 (50%); Tashana Bloomfield 1/1 (100%)

=== Round 3 ===
Tuesday, 24 September 2024	Cayman Islands	62–37	Dominica
15:30	Kay Copeland 53/56 (95%) ?? 9		Galeine Gordon-Seraphine 18; Anna-Maria Panthier 18 ?? 1

Tuesday, 24 September 2024	Grenada	82–8	Montserrat
17:00	Carlene Alexander 50/55 (91%); Celina Brown 17/19 (89%); Amy Nixon 9/12 (75%); Tiffany Frederick 5/6 (83%)		Juana Osborne 4/13 (31%) ?? 4

Tuesday, 24 September 2024	Saint Vincent and the Grenadines	68–37	Antigua and Barbuda
18:30	Mary-Ann Frederick 55/60 (92%); Kristiana Christopher 13/20 (65%)	Report	Rayana Regis 34/37 (92%); Amey Lake 3/7 (43%)

Tuesday, 24 September 2024	Saint Lucia	88–12	Anguilla
20:00	Merlessa Alfred 29/41 (71%); Dasha Eugene 20/22 (91%); Shem Maxwell 13/14 (93%) ?? 26		Desiree Anthoine 6/9 (67%); Tishana Depass-Smith 5/11 (45%) ?? 1

=== Round 4 ===
Wednesday, 25 September 2024	Grenada	55–30	Dominica
15:30	Carlene Alexander 40/41 (98%); Celina Brown 14/19 (74%); Brittany Jones 1/2 (50%)		Anna-Maria Panthier 23/31 (74%); Kenya John 5/5 (100%); Melisa Williams 2/2 (100%)

Wednesday, 25 September 2024	Antigua and Barbuda	81–27	Anguilla
17:00	Rayana Regis 73/80 (91%); Zhanira Pereira 7/8 (88%); Amey Lake 1/1 (100%)		Tishana Depass-Smith 17/25 (68%); Lakisha Hughes 10/13 (77%)

Wednesday, 25 September 2024	Cayman Islands	69–18	Montserrat
18:30	Rose Wilson 34/41 (83%); Kay Copeland 30/36 (83%) ?? 5		Juana Osborne 10/18 (56%); Twila Fenton 8/16 (50%)

Wednesday, 25 September 2024	Saint Lucia	45–56	Saint Vincent and the Grenadines
20:00	Deaha Eugene 22/27 (81%); Merlessa Alfred 20/29 (69%); Shem Maxwell 3/10 (30%)		Mary-Ann Frederick 47/49 (96%); Kristiana Christopher 9/9 (100%)

=== Round 5 ===
Thursday, 26 September 2024	Cayman Islands	56–31	Antigua and Barbuda
15:30	Kay Copeland 26/34 (76%); Meleshia Josephs 22/27 (81%); Rose Wilson 8/10 (80%)		Amey Lake 15/21 (71%); Tashana Bloomfield 10/11 (91%); Kizzy Hughes 5/6 (83%); Zhanira Pereira 1/2 (50%)

Thursday, 26 September 2024	Saint Vincent and the Grenadines	101–16	Montserrat
17:00	Mary-Ann Frederick 75/80 (94%); Kristiana Christopher 23/28 (82%); Jamarah Coombs 3/3 (100%)		Juana Osborne 12/19 (63%); Twila Fenton 3/5 (60%); Norissa Farrell-Bramble 1/1 (100%)

Thursday, 26 September 2024	Grenada	95–11	Anguilla
18:30	Carlene Alexander 80/93 (86%) ?? 15

Thursday, 26 September 2024	Saint Lucia	63–37	Dominica
20:00		Report

=== Round 6 ===
Saturday, 28 September 2024	Antigua and Barbuda	62–17	Montserrat
10:00		Report

Saturday, 28 September 2024	Saint Vincent and the Grenadines	56–41	Cayman Islands
11:30	Mary-Ann Frederick 40/44 (91%); Kristiana Christopher 16/18 (89%)	Report	Kay Copeland 34/44 (77%); Rose Wilson 6/10 (60%); Meleshia Josephs 1/3 (33%)

Saturday, 28 September 2024	Dominica	77–28	Anguilla
13:00		Report

Saturday, 28 September 2024	Saint Lucia	46–56	Grenada
14:30		Report

=== Round 7 ===
Sunday, 29 September 2024	Montserrat	34–23	Anguilla
14:00		Report

Sunday, 29 September 2024	Dominica	53–51	Antigua and Barbuda
15:30	Anna Maria Panthier 29/33 (88%); Gailene Gordon-Seraphin 21/28 (75%); Melissa Williams 3/5 (60%)		Rayana Regis 48/59 (81%); Amey Lake 3/3 (100%)

Sunday, 29 September 2024	Saint Lucia	56–42	Cayman Islands
17:00

Sunday, 29 September 2024	Saint Vincent and the Grenadines	59–50	Grenada
18:30	Mary-Ann Fredericks 54/60 (90%); Kristiana Christopher 5/7 (71%)		Carlene Alexander 36/39 (92%); Celina Brown 14/22 (64%)

== Final table ==
Pos	Team	P	W	L	D	GF	GA	GD	Pts
1	Saint Vincent and the Grenadines	7	7	0	0	498	229	+269	14
2	Grenada	7	5	2	0	422	229	+193	10
3	Saint Lucia	7	5	2	0	419	250	+169	10
	Cayman Islands	7	4	3	0	396	259	+137	8
4	Antigua and Barbuda	7	3	4	0	339	313	+26	6
5	Dominica	7	3	4	0	324	346	-22	6
6	Montserrat	7	1	6	0	118	461	-343	2
7	Anguilla	7	0	7	0	123	552	-429	0

Cayman Islands were a guest team and did not compete for the Gloria Ballantyne Championship Trophy

== Award winners ==
=== Overall series ===
Award	Winner	Team
Gloria Ballantyne Championship Trophy	Saint Vincent and the Grenadines	
Player of the Tournament	Jermia Martial	Saint Lucia
Most Accurate Shooter	Mary-Ann Fredericks 373/402 (93%)	Saint Vincent and the Grenadines
Best Defensive Player	Jermia Martial	Saint Lucia
Best Shooting Team	Saint Vincent and the Grenadines 498/586 (85%)	
Most Improved Team	Anguilla	
Best Defending Team	Grenada	
Best Team on Parade	Saint Lucia	

=== Teams' Individual MVPs ===
Winner	Team
	Anguilla
Rayana Regis	Antigua and Barbuda
	Cayman Islands
	Dominica
	Grenada
	Montserrat
Jermia Martial	Saint Lucia
Kristiana Christopher	Saint Vincent and the Grenadines
