= World Crazy Golf Championships =

International miniature golf competition

Coordinates: 50.855°N 0.587°E

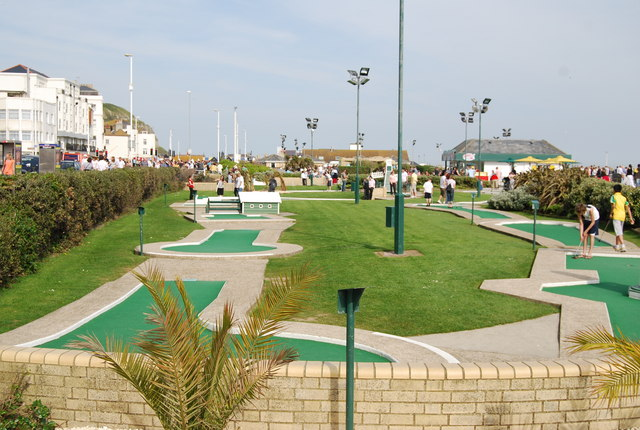
- Crazy Golf, sea front, Hastings
- Highest governing body: The British Minigolf Association (BMGA)
- First played: 2003

Characteristics
- Contact: No
- Type: Golf, Precision sport
- Equipment: Golf club, Golf ball, Crazy golf course
- Venue: Hastings Adventure Golf

The World Crazy Golf Championships (WCGC) have been staged since 2003 at the Adventure Golf Complex on Crazy Golf Course on the seafront of Hastings, East Sussex. From 2016, the World Crazy Golf Championships has taken place in June each year. The most recent event took place on 5, 6 & 7 June 2026.

Individual players from across the world contest for the trophy, including England, Scotland, Wales, Ireland, Finland, Germany, Czech Republic, Portugal and the United States. During the tournament's 24-year history (to 2026), only 8 different players have managed to lift the trophy.

== Rules and history of the WCGC ==
The World Crazy Golf Championships is open to everyone with no age restriction. There are also categories for women, juniors and novices each having their own dedicated trophies. The World Championship Crazy Golf courses at Hastings Adventure Golf on the town's seafront contain many hazards and obstacles over the 18 holes, including a water wheel, a windmill, an obelisk, lighthouse, ramps, bends, twists, bunkers and a cave. The World Crazy Golf Championships is a miniature golf tournament which has its own unique playing rules, such as every player using the same type of ball, thus able to have a world championship competition of its own.

In the main event, up to 162 competitors (in 2026) play six qualifying rounds, three each on the Saturday and Sunday, with just the lowest scoring 18 players making the cut to participate in the final round. Since 2010, the championship has been played on one course, the crazy golf, an Arnold Palmer type course with obstacles. Prior to this, it was played on two different 18 hole courses, the crazy golf and the former mini golf course. The winner receives £1500 in prize money, and a further £2500+ is distributed to the placed players.

In 2013 Czech teenager Olivia Prokopová became the first female winner and also the youngest ever champion at the age of 18.

The World Crazy Golf Championships are affiliated to the British Minigolf Association (BMGA) which is the governing body for minigolf sport, including crazy golf. The event was previously held in October, with the final played on Sunday afternoon, but later moved to the summer. In 2007, the mayor of Hastings watched the final and then presented the prizes and trophies to the winning players.

The course record is 27. This is shared by Andy Exall, Paul Tutt, Martyn Williams, and Marc Chapman.

== WCGC results 2003 to present ==
Event	Year	Entrants	Winner	Score	2nd	Score	3rd	Score	4th	Score	5th	Score	Ref
23rd	2026	98	(England) Rocky Bullin	224	(England) Marc Chapman	225	David Woodcock	225	(England) Adam Kelly	230	(England) Martin Greenhead	230	
22nd	2025	106	(England) Marc Chapman	222	(England) Murray Thompson	223	(Wales) Seve Kukielka	223	(England) Adam Kelly	225	(England) James Rutherford	226	
21st	2024	92	(England) Marc Chapman	217	(Wales) Stephen Skinner	224	(England) Adam Kelly	224	(England) Paul Tutt	225	(England) Martin Greenhead	226	
20th	2023	87	(England) Adam Kelly	217	(United States) Frank Bisesi	222	(England) Ed Pope	224	(England) Rocky Bullin	226	(England) Callan McHugh	226	
19th	2022	81	(England) Adam Kelly	217	(England) Marc Chapman	219	(England) Ed Pope	222	(England) Michael Smith	223	(United States) Frank Bisesi	223	
18th	2021	74	(England) Marc Chapman	224	(England) Ed Pope	228	(England) Adam Kelly	231	(England) Michael Smith	234	(Wales) Seve Kukielka	238	
2020 Event cancelled (COVID-19 pandemic)
17th	2019	110	(England) Marc Chapman	235	(England) Adam Kelly	237	(England) Michael Smith	243	(England) Martin Greenhead	248	(England) Steve Lovell	251	
16th	2018	96	(England) Marc Chapman	226	(England) Adam Kelly	227	(England) Michael Smith	228	(Portugal) Nuno Cunha	229	(England) Ed Pope	230	
15th	2017	58	(Czech Republic) Olivia Prokopová	235	(England) Steve Lovell	240	(England) Will Donnelly	241	(England) Chris Harding	241	(England) Adam Kelly	242	
14th	2016	71	(England) Michael Smith	233	(England) Sean Homer	237	(England) Mark Wood	238	(Germany) Thomas Giebenhein	238	(England) Derek Bentall	239	
13th	2015	75	(England) Michael Smith	221	(Finland) Pasi Aho	234	(England) Chris Harding	235	(Czech Republic) Olivia Prokopová	236	(England) Marc Chapman	237	
12th	2014	62	(England) Chris Harding	229	(Portugal) Nuno Cunha	236	(England) Adam Kelly	238	(England) Marc Chapman	238	(Finland) Pasi Aho	238	
11th	2013	78	(Czech Republic) Olivia Prokopová	250	(England) Sean Homer	271	(Finland) Pasi Aho	273	(England) Marc Chapman	275	(England) Michael Smith	275	
10th	2012	53	(England) Michael Smith	245	(England) James Rutherford	251	(Czech Republic) Olivia Prokopová	253	(England) Adam Kelly	255	(England) Sean Homer	256	
9th	2011	74	(England) Michael Smith	230	(England) Andy Exall	230	(England) James Rutherford	230	(England) Adam Kelly (jr)	231	(England) Tony Kelly	231	
8th	2010	54	(England) Chris Harding	222	(England) Peter Emmerson	223	(England) Michael Smith	226	(England) Marc Chapman	231	(Finland) Pasi Aho	233	
7th	2009	83	(England) Keith Kellard	247	(England) Peter Emmerson	252	(Finland) John Mittler	253	(Wales) Tim Davies	254	(England) Sean Homer	254	
6th	2008	68	(Wales) Tim Davies	250	(England) Chris Harding	252	(England) Andy Exall	254	(Finland) Pasi Aho	255	(England) Jo Williamson	256	
5th	2007	77	(England) Chris Harding	248	(England) Andy Exall	257	(England) Brad Shepherd	258	(England) Bill Bullin	261	(England) Ruth Bullin	262	
4th	2006	87	(Wales) Tim Davies	253	(England) Andy Exall	256	(England) Brad Shepherd	260	(England) John Moore	261	(Finland) Pasi Aho	261	
3rd	2005	102	(Wales) Tim Davies	258	(Czech Republic) Olivia Prokopová	260	(Finland) Pasi Aho	261	(England) Philip Exall	262	(England) Jon Angel	262	
2nd	2004	49	(Wales) Tim Davies	238	(Scotland) John McIver	251	(England) Peter Emmerson	270	(England) Keith Kellard	270	(England) Brad Shepherd	278	
1st	2003	25	(Wales) Tim Davies	272	(Scotland) John McIver	278	(Czech Republic) Olivia Prokopová	279	(England) Michael Webb	283	(Czech Republic) Katerina Kulhankova	286	

== WCGC Roll of Honour - Champions 2003 - present ==
Wins	Winner	Years won
5	(Wales) Tim Davies	2003 · 2004 · 2005 · 2006 · 2008
5	(England) Marc Chapman	2018 · 2019 · 2021 · 2024 · 2025
4	(England) Michael Smith	2011 · 2012 · 2015 · 2016
3	(England) Chris Harding	2007 · 2010 · 2014
2	(Czech Republic) Olivia Prokopová	2013 · 2017
2	(England) Adam Kelly	2022 · 2023
1	(England) Keith Kellard	2009
1	(England) Rocky Bullin	2026

== Top 9 WCGC best scores of all time ==
Order	Player	Score	year	Finishing position
1	(England) Adam Kelly	217	2022	Won
2	(England) Adam Kelly	217	2023	Won
3	(England) Marc Chapman	217	2024	Won
4	(England) Marc Chapman	219	2022	2nd
5	(England) Michael Smith	221	2015	Won
6	(England) Ed Pope	222	2022	3rd
7	(United States) Frank Bisesi	222	2023	2nd
8	(England) Chris Harding	222	2010	Won
9	(England) Marc Chapman	222	2025	Won
Last updated: 05.07.2023

== Team Event ==
Since 2021, a standalone team event has been held on the Friday evening prior to the main event

Year	Winners
2021	(England) David Gomm (England) David Hartley (England) Marion Hartley
2022	(Wales) Seve Kukielka (Wales) Stephen Skinner (United States) Frank Bisesi
2023	(Wales) Seve Kukielka (Wales) Stephen Skinner (United States) Tom Loftus
2024	(England) James Rutherford (England) Martin Greenhead (Wales) Martyn Williams
2025	(England) Charlie Reid (England) Beth Reid (England) Richard Reid
2026	(England) Brad Ames (England) Mark Stillman (England) Rob Webb

== WCGC Video History ==
- 2023 World Crazy Golf Championship courtesy of Britclip
- 2022 World Crazy Golf Championship courtesy of Brian the Brave
- 2021 World Crazy Golf Championship courtesy of Britclip
- 2019 World Crazy Golf Championship courtesy of Britclip
- 2018 World Crazy Golf Championship courtesy of Britclip
- 2017 World Crazy Golf Championship courtesy of Britclip
- 2016 World Crazy Golf Championship courtesy of Youtube
- 2015 World Crazy Golf Championship courtesy of Youtube
- 2014 World Crazy Golf Championships - Final Hole
- 2014 World Crazy Golf Championship courtesy of Britclip
- 2013 WCGC winner Olivia Prokopová
- 2012 World Crazy Golf Championship - Final Hole of the Final Round
- 2011 World Crazy Golf Championships - Final Play-off
- 2010 World Crazy Golf Championship courtesy of World Business
- 2009 World Crazy Golf Championship From Sky Sports News
- 2007 World Crazy Golf Championship courtesy of Youtube
