= 2024 FIBA 3x3 AmeriCup =

The 2024 FIBA 3x3 AmeriCup consists of two sections:

- 2024 FIBA 3x3 AmeriCup – Men's tournament
- 2024 FIBA 3x3 AmeriCup – Women's tournament
