= 2024 Breeders' Cup =

Thoroughbred horse racing event

- Class: Championship Event Series
- Location: Del Mar Fairgrounds, Del Mar, California
- Race type: Thoroughbred
- Website: www.breederscup.com

Race information
- Distance: See individual races
- Surface: Turf, Dirt
- Purse: Varies by Race; from $1 million to $7 million

The 2024 Breeders' Cup World Championships was the 41st edition of the premier event of the North American Thoroughbred horse racing year. The 14 races, all of which were Grade I, took place on November 1 and 2 at Del Mar in Del Mar, California In the United States, the two-day championship event was shown live across Peacock, USA Network, and FanDuel TV on Friday and Saturday.

The Breeders' Cup is generally regarded as the end of the North American racing season, although a few Grade I events take place in later November and December. The event typically determines champions in many of the Eclipse Award divisions.

== Sponsors ==
Sponsors for this year includes Cygames, Fanduel, Big Ass Fans, and others.

== Races ==
=== Friday, November 1 ===
Race name	Post time (PDT)	Sponsor	Distance	Restrictions	Purse	Winner (Bred)	Odds	Margin
Juvenile Turf Sprint	2:45 pm		5 furlongs	2-year-olds	$1 million	Magnum Force (IRE)	12.50	1/2 length
Juvenile Fillies	3:25 pm	NetJets	1 1/16 miles	2-year-old fillies	$2 million	Immersive	2.00	4 1/2 lengths
Juvenile Fillies Turf	4:05 pm	John Deere	1 mile	2-year-old fillies	$1 million	Lake Victoria (IRE)	0.70	1 1/2 lengths
Juvenile	4:45 pm	FanDuel	1 1/16 miles	2-year-old colts and geldings	$2 million	Citizen Bull (USA)	15.90	1 1/2 lengths
Juvenile Turf	5:25 pm		1 mile	2-year-old colts and geldings	$1 million	Henri Matisse (IRE)	3.90	neck

Legend:
Dirt Turf

=== Saturday, November 2 ===
Due to NBC's college football coverage, this year marks the first time that Breeders' Cup races were held after the Breeders' Cup Classic. The race 12 finale had a post time of 5:00 p.m. PDT.

Race name	Post time (PDT)	Sponsor	Distance	Restrictions	Purse	Winner (Bred)	Odds	Margin
Filly & Mare Sprint	12:00 pm	PNC Bank	7 furlongs	3 yrs+ fillies & mares	$1 million	Soul of an Angel	19.80	1/2 length
Turf Sprint	12:41 pm	Prevagen	5 furlongs	3 yrs+	$1 million	Starlust (GB)	33.60	neck
Distaff	1:21 pm	Longines	1 1/8 miles	3 yrs+ fillies & mares	$2 million	Thorpedo Anna	0.40	2 1/2 lengths
Turf	2:01 pm	Longines	1 1/2 miles	3 yrs+	$5 million	Rebel's Romance (IRE)	1.90	neck
Classic	2:41 pm	Longines	1 1/4 miles	3 yrs+	$7 million	Sierra Leone	6.90	1 1/2 lengths
Filly & Mare Turf	3:25 pm	Maker's Mark	1 1/4 miles	3 yrs+ fillies & mares	$2 million	Moira	5.80	1/2 length
Sprint	4:05 pm	Cygames	6 furlongs	3 yrs+	$2 million	Straight No Chaser	6.10	1/2 length
Mile	4:45 pm	FanDuel	1 mile	3 yrs+	$2 million	More Than Looks	6.90	3/4 length
Dirt Mile	5:25 pm	Big Ass Fans	1 mile	3 yrs+	$1 million	Full Serrano (ARG)	13.40	1 1/2 lengths

Legend:
Dirt Turf
