= 2024 Tour of Flanders =

2024 Tour of Flanders may refer to:

- 2024 Tour of Flanders (men's race)
- 2024 Tour of Flanders (women's race)
