= 2024 FIBA 3x3 U23 World Cup =

The 2024 FIBA 3x3 U23 World Cup consists of two sections:

- 2024 FIBA 3x3 U23 World Cup – Men's tournament
- 2024 FIBA 3x3 U23 World Cup – Women's tournament
