= 2024 Prix de l'Arc de Triomphe =

103rd Prix de l'Arc de Triomphe
- Prix de l'Arc de Triomphe
- Location: Longchamp Racecourse
- Date: 6 October 2024
- Winning horse: Bluestocking
- Starting price: 5/1
- Jockey: Rossa Ryan
- Trainer: Ralph Beckett
- Owner: Juddmonte
- Conditions: Very Soft

The 2024 Prix de l'Arc de Triomphe was a horse race held at Longchamp Racecourse on Sunday 6 October 2024. It was the 103rd running of the Prix de l'Arc de Triomphe. The race was won by Juddmonte's four-year-old filly Bluestocking, trained in Britain by Ralph Beckett and ridden by Rossa Ryan. It was the first win in the race for both Beckett and Ryan. Bluestocking had not originally been entered for the race and was supplemented at a cost of €120,000.

Bluestocking defeated Aventure by one and a quarter lengths, with Los Angeles finishing third and Sosie fourth. The race was run over 2,400 metres on very soft ground, with 16 runners taking part.

Bluestocking raced close to the leaders before taking the lead in the straight. She held off Aventure to win by one and a quarter lengths, with Los Angeles a further one and a half lengths behind in third.

== Full result ==
The below result is sourced from Racing Post, France Galop, and Sporting Life.

Pos.	Draw	Time	Marg.	Horse	Age	Jockey	Trainer (Country)
1	3	2:31.58		Bluestocking	4	Rossa Ryan	Ralph Beckett (GB)
2	4		1 1/4	Aventure	3	Stéphane Pasquier	Christophe Ferland (FR)
3	10		1 1/2	Los Angeles	3	Ryan Moore	Aidan O'Brien (IRE)
4	5		1 1/2	Sosie	3	Maxime Guyon	André Fabre (FR)
5	12		2 1/2	Sevenna's Knight	4	Mickael Barzalona	André Fabre (FR)
6	1		3/4	Zarakem	4	Cristian Demuro	Jerome Reynier (FR)
7	6		3/4	Survie	3	Tom Marquand	Nicolas Clément (FR)
8	7		1/2	Delius	3	Ioritz Mendizabal	Jean-Claude Rouget (FR)
9	2		3/4	Fantastic Moon	4	Rene Piechulek	Sarah Steinberg (GER)
10	15		3/4	Sunway	3	Oisin Murphy	David Menuisier (GB)
11	9		3/4	Al Riffa	4	Yutaka Take	Joseph O'Brien (IRE)
12	11		1	Shin Emperor	3	Ryusei Sakai	Yoshito Yahagi (JPN)
13	8		6	Look de Vega	3	Ronan Thomas	Carlos & Yann Lerner (FR)
14	16		2 1/2	Mqse de Sevigne	5	Alexis Pouchin	André Fabre (FR)
15	14		head	Continuous	4	Christophe Soumillon	Aidan O'Brien (IRE)
16	13		PU	Haya Zark	5	William Buick	Adrien Fouassier (FR)

== Race details ==
- Sponsor: Qatar Racing and Equestrian Club
- Purse: €5,000,000
- Going: Very Soft
- Distance: 2,400 metres
- Number of runners: 16
- Winner's time: 2:31.58
