= Israel national judo team =

National judo team

Sport
- Country: Israel
- Sport: Judo
- Event: Team \ Mixed-team
- Coached by: Oren Smadja (Men); Shany Hershko (Women)

Achievements and titles
- Olympic finals: (bronze) (2021, Mixed)
- World finals: (bronze) (2022, Mixed)
- Regional finals: (gold) (2005, Men)
- Highest world ranking: 4^{th} (Seniors); 16^{th} (Juniors)

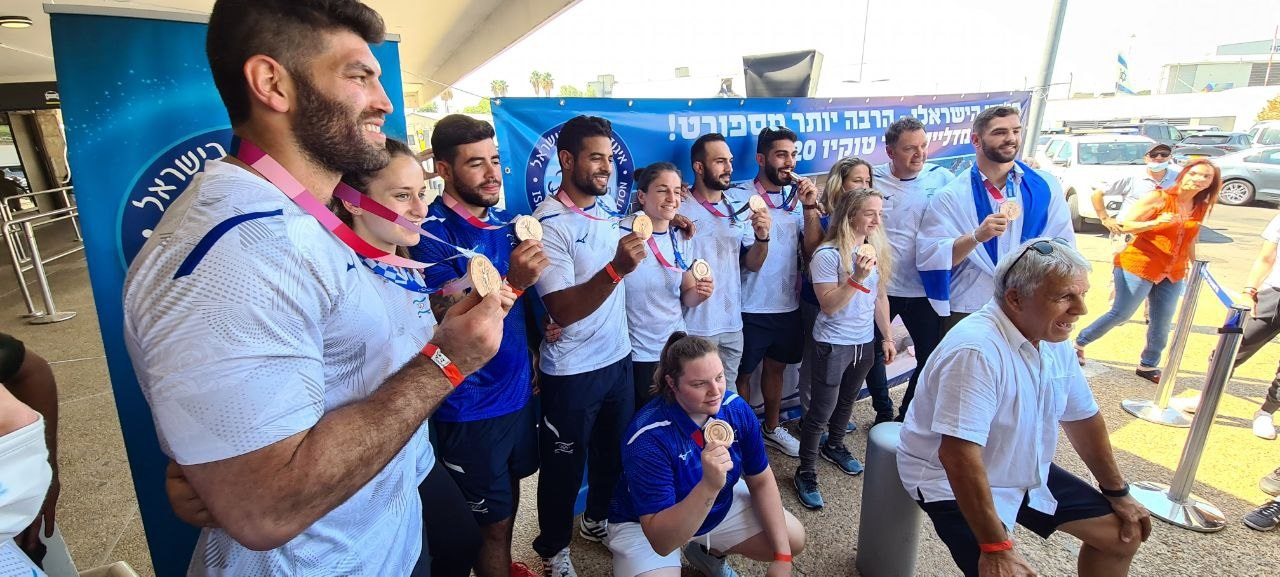
The Israel national judo team members, wearing their bronze medals from the 2020 Summer Olympics Mixed Team event in 2021

The Israel national judo team consists of the men's team coached by Olympic medalist Oren Smadja and the women's team coached by Shany Hershko. It is assembled by the Israel Judo Association.

The team won a bronze medal at the mixed team event of the 2020 Summer Olympics. Previously, the men's team won a gold medal at the 2005 European Team Championships.

== Seniors ==
=== Individual ===
==== Active judoka ====
The following are medals won in individual Olympic competitions, World and European Championships as well as World Tour tournaments, by active members of the Israel national judo team, as of 2 November 2026, after the 2026 Abu Dhabi Grand Slam.

Weight Class (Current)	Judoka		Summer Olympics			World Championships			World Masters			Grand Slam			European Championships			Grand Prix			Total			Ref.
Weight Class (Current)	Name	Age	1st place, gold medalist(s)	2nd place, silver medalist(s)	3rd place, bronze medalist(s)	1st place, gold medalist(s)	2nd place, silver medalist(s)	3rd place, bronze medalist(s)	1st place, gold medalist(s)	2nd place, silver medalist(s)	3rd place, bronze medalist(s)	1st place, gold medalist(s)	2nd place, silver medalist(s)	3rd place, bronze medalist(s)	1st place, gold medalist(s)	2nd place, silver medalist(s)	3rd place, bronze medalist(s)	1st place, gold medalist(s)	2nd place, silver medalist(s)	3rd place, bronze medalist(s)	1st place, gold medalist(s)	2nd place, silver medalist(s)	3rd place, bronze medalist(s)	Ref.
M-60	Izhak Ashpiz	19	–	–	–	–	–	–	–	–	–	2	–	2	–	–	1	1	–	–	3	–	3	Ref.
M-60	Yam Wolczak	23	–	–	–	–	–	–	–	–	–	–	1	–	–	–	–	–	–	–	–	1	–	
M-66	Baruch Shmailov	32	–	–	–	–	–	–	1	2	1	1	1	5	–	–	–	–	4	2	2	7	8	
M-66	Tal Flicker	34	–	–	–	–	–	1	–	–	–	2	–	2	–	1	1	3	–	5	5	1	9	
M-66	Guy Gutman	24	–	–	–	–	–	–	–	–	–	–	–	–	–	–	–	–	–	1	–	–	1	
M-73	Tohar Butbul	32	–	–	–	–	–	–	–	1	–	–	1	8	–	1	–	2	1	3	2	4	11	
M-81	Sagi Muki	34	–	–	–	1	–	–	–	1	1	5	1	4	2	–	1	4	3	3	12	5	9	
M-90	Li Kochman	31	–	–	–	–	–	–	–	–	–	–	–	1	–	1	–	–	1	3	–	2	4	
M-100	Peter Paltchik	34	–	–	1	–	–	1	–	1	2	2	2	7	1	–	1	4	–	2	7	3	14	
M-100	Iosif Simin	25	–	–	–	–	–	–	–	–	–	–	–	–	–	–	–	–	–	1	–	–	1	
W-48	Shira Rishony	35	–	–	–	–	–	–	–	–	–	–	1	5	–	–	1	3	2	6	3	3	12	
W-48	Tamar Malca	26	–	–	–	–	–	–	–	–	–	–	1	1	–	–	1	–	–	2	–	1	4	
W-52	Gefen Primo	26	–	–	–	–	–	1	–	–	1	4	1	8	–	–	2	1	–	6	5	1	18	
W-57	Timna Nelson-Levy	32	–	–	–	–	–	–	–	–	–	2	1	10	1	1	2	2	2	4	5	4	16	
W-57	Inbal Shemesh	29	–	–	–	–	–	–	–	–	–	2	3	–	–	–	–	–	1	3	2	4	3	
W-63	Gili Sharir	26	–	–	–	–	–	–	–	–	1	1	1	3	–	1	1	1	1	1	2	3	6	
W-63	Kerem Primo	21	–	–	–	–	1	–	–	–	–	–	–	1	–	–	–	–	–	1	–	1	2	
W-70	Maya Goshen	26	–	–	–	–	–	–	–	–	–	–	–	2	–	–	–	–	–	–	–	–	2	
W-70	Maya Kogan	23	–	–	–	–	–	–	–	–	–	–	–	–	–	–	–	–	1	–	–	1	–	
W-70	Adelina Novitzki	23	–	–	–	–	–	–	–	–	–	–	–	1	–	–	–	–	–	–	–	–	1	
W-78	Inbar Lanir	26	–	1	–	1	–	–	1	–	–	1	5	6	–	–	2	–	1	1	3	7	9	
W+78	Raz Hershko	28	–	1	–	–	–	2	–	–	1	7	3	8	2	3	–	4	1	1	13	8	12	
W+78	Yuli Alma Mishiner	21	–	–	–	–	–	–	–	–	–	–	–	2	–	–	–	–	1	2	–	1	4	
Total	Men		–	–	1	1	–	2	1	5	4	12	6	29	3	3	4	14	9	20	31	23	60	
Total	Women		–	2	–	1	1	3	1	–	3	17	16	47	3	5	9	11	10	27	33	34	89	
Total	Total		–	2	1	2	1	5	2	5	7	29	22	76	6	8	13	25	19	47	64	57	149	

===== Current national team coaches =====
As of 13 October 2022

Men's head coach: Oren Smadja

Other men's coaches: Guy Fogel, Gil Ofer, Golan Pollack & Artur Katayev.

Women's head coach: Shany Hershko

Other women's coaches: Charles Chibana, Miki Tanaka & Amélie Rosseneu.

==== Olympic, World and European championships ====
Summer Olympics
Year	Medal	Judoka	Ref.
1992	2nd place, silver medalist(s)	Yael Arad	
1992	3rd place, bronze medalist(s)	Oren Smadja	
2004	3rd place, bronze medalist(s)	Ariel Ze'evi	
2016	3rd place, bronze medalist(s)	Yarden Gerbi	
2016	3rd place, bronze medalist(s)	Or Sasson	
2024	3rd place, bronze medalist(s)	Peter Paltchik	
2024	2nd place, silver medalist(s)	Inbar Lanir	
2024	2nd place, silver medalist(s)	Raz Hershko	

World Championships
Year	Medal	Judoka	Ref.
1991	3rd place, bronze medalist(s)	Yael Arad	
1993	2nd place, silver medalist(s)	Yael Arad	
1995	2nd place, silver medalist(s)	Oren Smadja	
2001	2nd place, silver medalist(s)	Ariel Ze'evi	
2009	3rd place, bronze medalist(s)	Alice Schlesinger	
2013	1st place, gold medalist(s)	Yarden Gerbi	
2014	2nd place, silver medalist(s)	Yarden Gerbi	
2015	3rd place, bronze medalist(s)	Golan Pollack	
2017	3rd place, bronze medalist(s)	Tal Flicker	
2019	1st place, gold medalist(s)	Sagi Muki	
2021	3rd place, bronze medalist(s)	Gefen Primo	
2023	1st place, gold medalist(s)	Inbar Lanir	
2023	3rd place, bronze medalist(s)	Peter Paltchik	
2023	3rd place, bronze medalist(s)	Raz Hershko	
2026	2nd place, silver medalist(s)	Kerem Primo	
2026	3rd place, bronze medalist(s)	Raz Hershko	

European Championships
Year	1st place, gold medalist(s)	2nd place, silver medalist(s)	3rd place, bronze medalist(s)	Ref.
1989			Yael Arad	
1991			Yael Arad	
1992			Oren Smadja	
1993	Yael Arad			
1995			Einat Yaron	
1999			Ariel Ze'evi	
2001	Ariel Ze'evi			
2003	Ariel Ze'evi			
2004	Ariel Ze'evi	Yoel Razvozov		
2005		Ariel Ze'evi, Yoel Razvozov	Andrian Kordon	
2007			Ariel Ze'evi, Gal Yekutiel	
2008			Ariel Ze'evi, Alice Schlesinger	
2009			Alice Schlesinger	
2010			Ariel Ze'evi	
2012	Ariel Ze'evi	Yarden Gerbi	Soso Palelashvili, Alice Schlesinger	
2013			Yarden Gerbi, Tommy Arshansky	
2014			Gili Cohen	
2015	Sagi Muki	Or Sasson	Yarden Gerbi	
2016		Or Sasson	Timna Nelson-Levy	
2018	Sagi Muki		Tal Flicker, Peter Paltchik, Gefen Primo	
2019		Li Kochman		
2020	Peter Paltchik	Tal Flicker		
2021		Tohar Butbul	Sagi Muki, Gefen Primo	
2022	Timna Nelson-Levy	Raz Hershko	Shira Rishony, Gili Sharir	
2023		Raz Hershko, Gili Sharir	Inbar Lanir	
2024	Raz Hershko		Tamar Malca, Timna Nelson-Levy, Inbar Lanir	
2025		Raz Hershko		
2026	Raz Hershko	Timna Nelson-Levy	Izhak Ashpiz	

=== Team ===
Year	Competition	Gender	Result	Ref.
2005	European Championships	Men	1st place, gold medalist(s)	
2006	World Championships	Men	9	
2006	European Championships	Men	5	
2014	European Championships	Men	R16	
2018	European Championships	Mixed	R16	
2021	Summer Olympics	Mixed	3rd place, bronze medalist(s)	
2021	European Championships	Mixed	7	
2022	World Championships	Mixed	3rd place, bronze medalist(s)	
2023	European Games	Mixed	R16	
2024	Summer Olympics	Mixed	R16	

==== 2005 European Team Championships ====
Stage	Opponent	Result	Men –60	Men –66	Men –73	Men –81	Men –90	Men –100	Men +100
Semi-finals	France	4 – 2	Gal Yekutiel	—	Yoel Razvozov	Avisar Sheinmann	Alon Sasson	Rostislav Lis	Andrian Kordon
Final	Hungary	4 – 3	Gal Yekutiel	Zvi Szafran	Yoel Razvozov	Avisar Sheinmann	Alon Sasson	Rostislav Lis	Andrian Kordon
References									

==== 2006 World Team Championships ====
Stage	Opponent	Result	Men –60	Men –66	Men –73	Men –81	Men –90	Men –100	Men +100
Round of 16	Cuba	4 – 3	Gal Yekutiel	Zvi Szafran	Guy Vaserdam	Avisar Sheinmann	Alon Sasson	Victor Fishman	Rostislav Lis
Quarter-finals	South Korea	1 – 6	Gal Yekutiel	Zvi Szafran	Jonathan Wolf	Avisar Sheinmann	Alon Sasson	Victor Fishman	Rostislav Lis
Repechage	Hungary	2 – 5							
References									

==== 2014 European Championships ====
Stage	Opponent	Result	Men –66	Men –73	Men –81	Men –90	Men +90	Ref.
Round of 16	France	1 – 4	Golan Pollack	Sagi Muki	Asaf Chen	Alon Sasson	Peter Paltchik	

==== 2018 European Mixed Team Championships ====
Stage	Opponent	Result	Women –57	Women –70	Women +70	Men –73	Men –90	Men +90	Ref.
Round of 16	Turkey	1 – 4	Maayan Greenberg	Yarden Mayersohn	—	Ran Rosemarin	Alexander Diachenko		

==== 2020 Summer Olympics ====
During the 2020 Summer Olympics, the men's squad was coached by Israeli former judoka and Olympic bronze medalist Oren Smadja, whereas the women's team was coached by Israeli former judoka Shany Hershko.

There were 13 Israeli judokas at the 2020 Summer Olympics, but only 12 were registered for the Mixed Team Competition, leaving female judoka Gili Cohen outside. Also, 3 Israeli judokas (Baruch Shmailov, Inbar Lanir, and Shira Rishony) did not actively compete yet they were registered to this tournament, and as such- received the shared Olympic Mixed Team bronze medal as well with the other who had their battles.

Stage	Opponent	Result	Women –57	Women –70	Women +70	Men –73	Men –90	Men +90	Golden score	Ref.
First round	Italy (ITA)	4 – 3	Timna Nelson-Levy	Gili Sharir	Raz Hershko	Tohar Butbul	Li Kochman	Peter Paltchik	Gili Sharir	
Quarter-finals	France (FRA)	3 – 4	Timna Nelson-Levy	Gili Sharir	Raz Hershko	Tohar Butbul	Li Kochman	Or Sasson	Gili Sharir	
Repechage	Brazil (BRA)	4 – 2	Timna Nelson-Levy	Gili Sharir	Raz Hershko	Tohar Butbul	Li Kochman	Peter Paltchik	—	
Bronze medal	ROC	4 – 1	Timna Nelson-Levy	Gili Sharir	Raz Hershko	—	Sagi Muki	Peter Paltchik	—	

==== 2021 European Mixed Team Championships ====
Stage	Opponent	Result	Women –57	Women –70	Women +70	Men –73	Men –90	Men +90	Ref.
Round of 16	Belarus	1 – 4	Maya Leopold	—	Shoshana Kahlon	Ido Levin	Guy Gurevitch	Serafim Kompaniez	
Repechage 1	Spain	4 – 1	Maya Leopold	Shaked Amihai	—	Oron Giner	Guy Gurevitch	Serafim Kompaniez	
Repechage 2	Germany	1 – 4	Maya Leopold	Shaked Amihai	Shoshana Kahlon	Ido Levin	Guy Gurevitch	—	

==== 2022 World Championships ====
Stage	Opponent	Result	Women –57	Women –70	Women +70	Men –73	Men –90	Men +90	Golden score	Ref.
Round of 16	Uzbekistan	4 – 2	Timna Nelson-Levy	Maya Goshen	Raz Hershko	Ido Levin	Sagi Muki	Peter Paltchik	—	
Quarter-finals	South Korea	4 – 3	Timna Nelson-Levy	Maya Goshen	Raz Hershko	Ido Levin	Sagi Muki	Peter Paltchik	Raz Hershko	
Semi-finals	France	1 – 4	Timna Nelson-Levy	Maya Goshen	Raz Hershko	—	Sagi Muki	Peter Paltchik	—	
Bronze medal	Netherlands	4 – 2	Timna Nelson-Levy	Maya Goshen	Raz Hershko	Ido Levin	Guy Gurevitch	Peter Paltchik	—	

==== 2023 European Games ====
Stage	Opponent	Result	Women –57	Women –70	Women +70	Men –73	Men –90	Men +90	Ref.
Round of 16	Turkey	1 – 4	Maya Leopold	Gaya Bar Or	Yuli Alma Mishiner	—	Nadav Zurat	Daniel Bershadsky	

==== 2024 Summer Olympics ====
Stage	Opponent	Result	Women –57	Women –70	Women +70	Men –73	Men –90	Men +90	Golden score	Ref.
First round	Mongolia (MGL)	4 – 3	Timna Nelson-Levy	Gili Sharir	Raz Hershko	Tohar Butbul	Sagi Muki	Peter Paltchik	Sagi Muki	
Round of 16	France (FRA)	0 – 4	Timna Nelson-Levy	Gili Sharir	Raz Hershko	Tohar Butbul	Sagi Muki	Peter Paltchik	—	

== Under 23 ==
European U23 Championships
Year	1st place, gold medalist(s)	2nd place, silver medalist(s)	3rd place, bronze medalist(s)	Ref.
2009	Alice Schlesinger			
2011		Omri Kenyon		
2013		Gili Cohen	Noa Minsker	
2014	Baruch Shmailov		Li Kochman, Yacov Mamistvalov	
2015		Noa Minsker		
2016		Tohar Butbul, Adi Grossman	Alexander Raskopine	
2017		Raz Hershko	Gili Sharir	
2018	Betina Temelkova		Yarin Menaged, Tamar Malca, Inbal Shemesh, Raz Hershko	
2019			Inbar Lanir	
2020	Inbar Lanir	Maya Goshen	Yehonatan Elbaz	
2022			Guy Gurevitch, Serafim Kompaniez	
2024	Yuli Alma Mishiner		Gaya Bar Or	
2026	Yehonatan Veksler, Itay Bibitko		Ilay Hayun	

=== Under 23 team ===
==== 2024 European U23 Judo Championships — Mixed team ====
Stage	Opponent	Result	Women –57	Women –70	Women +70	Men –73	Men –90	Men +90
Quarter-finals	Netherlands	0 – 4	Romi Dori	Maya Kogan	Yuli Alma Mishiner	Tom Bulocinic	Roy Sivan	Iftach Badash
Repechage	Hungary	4 – 2	Romi Dori	Maya Kogan	Yuli Alma Mishiner	Tom Bulocinic	Roy Sivan	Iftach Badash
Bronze	Germany	1 – 4	Hili Zakroisky	Gaya Bar Or	Maya Kogan	Eran Fiks	Roy Sivan	Iftach Badash
References								

== Juniors ==
World Juniors Championships
Year	Medal	Judoka	Ref.
1990	2nd place, silver medalist(s)	Oren Smadja	
1998	3rd place, bronze medalist(s)	Ehud Vaks	
2004	3rd place, bronze medalist(s)	Alice Schlesinger	
2008	2nd place, silver medalist(s)	Shahar Levy	
2009	2nd place, silver medalist(s)	Shahar Levy	
2014	3rd place, bronze medalist(s)	Baruch Shmailov	
2018	2nd place, silver medalist(s)	Gefen Primo	
2021	2nd place, silver medalist(s)	Kerem Primo	
2023	2nd place, silver medalist(s)	Eran Fiks	
2025	3rd place, bronze medalist(s)	Yuli Alma Mishiner	
2026	2nd place, silver medalist(s)	Tom Simkhaev	

European Junior Championships
Year	1st place, gold medalist(s)	2nd place, silver medalist(s)	3rd place, bronze medalist(s)	Ref.
1974			Rami Kedem, Zerakh Nativ, Ben Jehuda	
1989			Batia Frantzuzu	
1990			Oren Smadja, Amit Lang	
1991		Vitali Kolner		
1992		Bronislaw Malinski		
1993			Guy Fogel	
1994			Ariel Ze'evi	
1995	Ariel Ze'evi			
1998			Yehuda Cohen, Noam Chami	
1999		Yehuda Cohen, Noa Bower	Alexander Bletel	
2000			Gal Yekutiel, Taly Rondel	
2001			Itai Mazor	
2002		Noa Laor	Michal Feinblat	
2003		Rostislav Lis	Eyal Yehiel, Michal Feinblat	
2004	Tatyana Simantov			
2005	Tatyana Simantov, Alon Sasson		Alice Schlesinger	
2006		Alice Schlesinger		
2007	Alice Schlesinger			
2008			Yarden Gerbi	
2011		Peter Paltchik	Sagi Muki	
2012		Noa Minsker	Rotem Shor	
2014	Baruch Shmailov		Tohar Butbul	
2016			Inbal Shemesh	
2017		Betina Temelkova, Gili Sharir	Gefen Primo	
2020			Tamar Malca, Shaked Amihai, Inbar Lanir	
2021	Kerem Primo		Matan Kokolayev	
2022		Adelina Novitzki	Yam Wolczak, Maya Kogan	
2023		Yehonatan Veksler, Adelina Novitzki	Yuli Alma Mishiner	
2024			Gal Kloda, Yuli Alma Mishiner	
2025			Hili Zakroisky, Kerem Primo, Yuli Alma Mishiner	
2026			Hili Zakroisky	

=== Juniors Team ===
Year	Competition	Gender	Result	Ref.
2013	World Championships	Women	7	
2017	European Championships	Men	R16	
2021	European Championships	Mixed	R16	

==== 2017 European Junior Judo Championships — Men's team ====
Stage	Opponent	Result	Men –66	Men –73	Men –81	Men –90	Men +90
Round of 16	United Kingdom	2–3	Alon Aharon	Amit Bobovich	Ari Vinkler	Itay Golan	Almog Louzon
References							

==== 2021 European Junior Judo Championships — Mixed team ====
Stage	Opponent	Result	Women –57	Women –70	Women +70	Men –73	Men –90	Men +90
Round of 16	Poland	2–4	Romi Dori	Maya Kogan	Yuli Alma Mishiner	Eylon Barsheshet	Roy Sivan	Nadav Zurat
References								

== Cadets ==
Updated to 22 August 2026, after the 2026 World Judo Cadets Championships.

World Cadets Championships
Year	Medal	Judoka	Ref.
2019	3rd place, bronze medalist(s)	Roy Sivan	
2023	1st place, gold medalist(s)	Izhak Ashpiz	
2023	3rd place, bronze medalist(s)	Hili Zakroisky	
2026	1st place, gold medalist(s)	Ella Barlev	
2026	3rd place, bronze medalist(s)	Agam Sol Noy	
2026	3rd place, bronze medalist(s)	Tom Simkhaev	

European Youth Olympic Festival
Year	1st place, gold medalist(s)	2nd place, silver medalist(s)	3rd place, bronze medalist(s)	Ref.
1999	Alexander Bletel		Taly Rondel, Gila Shikly	
2001	Nitzan Mazor, Liraz Ben Melech			
2003	Tatyana Simantov		Alice Schlesinger	
2005	Shahar Levy, David Mamistvalov		Aviv Hatzir	
2007		Tommy Arshansky	Golan Pollack, Yair Svidersky	
2009			Adi Zlochenko	
2011	Alexander Raskopine		Bar Farin	
2013			Paz Liebel	
2015		Raz Hershko		
2017	Gefen Primo			
2022	Kerem Primo	Yuli Alma Mishiner	Roy Rubinstein, Robert Sorkin	
2025		Yuval Gabay		

European Cadet Championships
Year	1st place, gold medalist(s)	2nd place, silver medalist(s)	3rd place, bronze medalist(s)	Ref.
1974			Rami Kedem	
1977			Jacob Baruch	
2000		Eyal Yehiel	Guy Vaserdam	
2002	Tatyana Simantov		Alon Sasson	
2004	Alice Schlesinger			
2005	Shahar Levy, David Mamistvalov		Aviv Hatzir	
2006			Vadim Guschin, Shahar Levy	
2007	Tommy Arshansky			
2009	Yacov Mamistvalov		Adi Zlochenko	
2011			Li Kochman	
2013			Daniel Ben David, Inbal Shemesh	
2014		Ofek Shani		
2015	Raz Hershko	Alon Aharon		
2016			Yehonatan Elbaz, Dilan Rechister	
2017		Tamar Malca, Gefen Primo	Matan Shani	
2021	Yehonatan Veksler, Kerem Primo	Yuli Alma Mishiner	Robert Sorkin	
2022		Yuli Alma Mishiner		
2023		Libi Becker	Ben Tamary, Izhak Ashpiz	
2024	Izhak Ashpiz		Michael Eldan, Shalev Cohen, Hili Zakroisky	
2026	Yali Yahav	Tom Simkhaev	Itamar Cohen	

=== Cadets Team ===
Year	Competition	Gender	Result	Ref.
2015	European Championships	Men	5	
2017	European Championships	Men	1R	
2022	European Youth Olympic Festival	Mixed	3rd place, bronze medalist(s)	
2023	European Championships	Mixed	9	
2023	European Youth Olympic Festival	Mixed	R16	

==== 2015 European Cadet Judo Championships — Men's team ====
Stage	Opponent	Result	Men –60	Men –66	Men –73	Men –81	Men +81
Second round	Moldova	3–2	Amit Bobovich	Oron Giner	Asaf Mellul	Dilan Rechister	Almog Louzoun
Quarter-finals	Ukraine	2–3	Tomer Golomb	Oron Giner	Asaf Mellul	Dilan Rechister	Almog Louzoun
Repechage 1	Portugal	4–1	Amit Bobovich	Amir Dayan	Dilan Rechister	Asaf Mellul	Almog Louzoun
Repechage 2	Italy	4–1	Tomer Golomb	Amit Bobovich	Oron Giner	Asaf Mellul	Almog Louzoun
Bronze	France	0–5	Tomer Golomb	Amit Bobovich	Dilan Rechister	Asaf Mellul	Almog Louzoun
References							

==== 2017 European Cadet Judo Championships — Men's team ====
Stage	Opponent	Result	Men –60	Men –66	Men –73	Men –81	Men +81
First round	Germany	2–3	Roie Rosen	Sagiv Sahar	Oren Azulai	Iftach Badash	Serafim Kompaniez
References							

==== 2022 European Youth Summer Olympic Festival — Mixed team ====
Stage	Opponent	Result	Men –66	Men –81	Men +81	Women –52	Women –63	Women +63	Golden score	Ref.
Second round	Austria	4–2	Robert Sorkin	Yaniv Agronov	Inbar Gabay	Sofiia Kuchkova	Kerem Primo	Yuli Alma Mishiner	—	
Quarter-finals	Ukraine	1–4	Robert Sorkin	Yaniv Agronov	Inbar Gabay	Sofiia Kuchkova	—	Yuli Alma Mishiner	—	
Repechage	Italy	4–3	Oren Aharon	Yaniv Agronov	Inbar Gabay	Sofiia Kuchkova	Kerem Primo	Yuli Alma Mishiner	Yaniv Agronov	
Bronze medal	France	4–1	Oren Aharon	Yaniv Agronov	Inbar Gabay	Sofiia Kuchkova	Kerem Primo	—	—	

==== 2023 European Cadet Judo Championships — Mixed team ====
Stage	Opponent	Result	Men –66	Men –81	Men +81	Women –52	Women –63	Women +63	Golden score
First round	Estonia	4–2	Izhak Ashpiz	Alexander Ronis	Ohad Haimov	Libi Becker	Lihi Boaron	Eva Sherbakov	
Quarter-finals	Italy	1–4	Izhak Ashpiz	Alexander Ronis	—	Libi Becker	Lihi Boaron	Eva Sherbakov	
Repechage 1	Romania	3–4	Izhak Ashpiz	Alexander Ronis	Ohad Haimov	Noa Hadar	Hili Zakroisky	Eva Sherbakov	Ohad Haimov
References									

==== 2023 European Youth Summer Olympic Festival — Mixed team ====
Stage	Opponent	Result	Men –66	Men –81	Men +81	Women –52	Women –63	Women +63	Golden score
Round of 16	Slovenia	3–4	Shalev Cohen	Yair Grosman	Eliran Hay Vitorio Bettan	Libi Becker	Lihi Boaron	Eva Sherbakov	Eliran Hay Vitorio Bettan
References									
