= Fidan Alizada =

Azerbaijani judoka (born 2005)

Personal information
- Born: 19 June 2005 (age 21)
- Occupation: Judoka

Sport
- Country: Azerbaijan
- Sport: Judo
- Weight class: ‍–‍57 kg
- Club: Neftchi SK

Achievements and titles
- World Champ.: R32 (2025)
- European Champ.: R16 (2025)
Medal record
Women's judo
Representing Azerbaijan
European U23 Championships
Gold medal – first place	2024 Piła	‍–‍57 kg
European Junior Championships
Gold medal – first place	2024 Tallinn	‍–‍57 kg
World Cadets Championships
Silver medal – second place	2022 Sarajevo	Mixed team
European Cadet Championships
Gold medal – first place	2022 Poreč	‍–‍57 kg
European Youth Olympic Festival
Gold medal – first place	2022 Poreč	‍–‍57 kg

Profile at external databases
- IJF: 60161
- JudoInside.com: 146410
- Updated on 24 April 2025

Fidan Alizada (born 19 June 2005) is an Azerbaijani judoka, who competes in the ‍‍–‍57 kg event. She won a gold medal in the women's 57 kg events at the 2022 European Cadet Championships held in Poreč, and a gold medal at the 2024 European Junior Championships held in Tallinn.

== Career ==
In 2020, Alizada competed in the 2020 Cadet European Cup held in Fuengirola, but she was unable to secure a placement.

In 2022, she competed in several Cadet European Cups; she won a gold medal in Bucharest, and a bronze medal in Fuengirola. In June, Alizada competed at the 2022 European Cadet Championship, held in Poreč, Croatia, and she won a gold medal in women –57 kg event, and also a bronze medal, as a part of the Azerbaijani team, in mixed teams event. In the same year, Alizada won a gold medal at the European Youth Summer Olympic Festival, held in Banská Bystrica. In 2022, she also competed both individually and as part of the team at the World Cadets Championships, held in Sarajevo. In the semifinals of the championship, she suffered a leg injury, and since Alizada, who was competing in the 63 kg weight category, was chosen for the final through a draw, the team did not participate in the match due to her injury. As a result, the victory went to the other team, and the Azerbaijan team finished the championship with a silver medal.

In 2023, she won a silver medal at the Junior European Cup in Berlin. Alizada competed in the 2023 European Junior Championships, and the 2023 World Juniors Championships. She also represented Azerbaijan at the 2023 European Mixed Team Judo Championships. She was part of the team representing Azerbaijan in judo at the 2023 European Games.

In 2024, she won a gold medal in the Junior European Cup in held in Berlin. On September 5, 2024, she won a gold medal at the 2024 European Junior Judo Championships held in Tallinn, the capital of Estonia. In October, Alizada competed at the World Judo Juniors Championship held in Dushanbe, Tajikistan, and finished in seventh place. In November, Alizada competed at the European U23 Judo Championships, held in Piła, Poland, and won the gold medal in the 57 kg weight category.

On February 14, 2025, she competed in the –57 kg weight category at the Grand Slam Baku and placed 7th. On April 6, 2025, Alizada won the gold medal in the –57 kg weight category at the European Cup held in Dubrovnik, Croatia.
