= Alon Sasson =

Israeli judoka (born 1986)

Personal information
- Native name: אלון ששון
- Born: 30 July 1986 (age 39)
- Occupation: Judoka

Sport
- Country: Israel
- Sport: Judo
- Weight class: ‍–‍90 kg

Achievements and titles
- European Champ.: R16 (2006, 2007, 2009)
Medal record
Men's judo
Representing Israel
European Championships
Gold medal – first place	2005 Debrecen	Men's team
IJF Grand Prix
Silver medal – second place	2014 Qingdao	‍–‍90 kg
Bronze medal – third place	2013 Rijeka	‍–‍90 kg
European Junior Championships
Gold medal – first place	2005 Zagreb	‍–‍90 kg
European Cadet Championships
Bronze medal – third place	2002 Győr	‍–‍81 kg

Profile at external databases
- IJF: 10123
- JudoInside.com: 33653
- Updated on 2 February 2022

Alon Sasson (Hebrew: אלון ששון; born 30 July 1986) is an Israeli former judoka.

As part of the Israel national judo team, Sasson won the 2005 European Team Judo Championships. He is the older brother of the two-time Israeli Olympic medalist and former judoka Or "Ori" Sasson.
