= Handball at the 2023 European Youth Summer Olympic Festival =

- Venue: Vrbanska Sports Hall
- Date: 24–29 July

Handball at the 2023 European Youth Summer Olympic Festival was held in Maribor, Slovenia, from 24 to 29 July 2023.

== Medal table ==
* Host nation (Slovenia)

Rank	Nation	Gold	Silver	Bronze	Total
1	France	1	0	0	1
1	Germany	1	0	0	1
3	Romania	0	1	0	1
3	Slovenia	0	1	0	1
5	Hungary	0	0	1	1
5	Poland	0	0	1	1
Totals (6 entries)		2	2	2	6

== Medalists ==
Event	Gold	Silver	Bronze
Boys	Germany (GER)	Slovenia (SLO)	Hungary (HUN)
Girls	France (FRA)	Romania (ROU)	Poland (POL)

== Participating nations ==
A total of 240 athletes from 14 nations competed in handball at the 2023 European Youth Summer Olympic Festival:

- Croatia (15)
- Czech Republic (15)
- France (15)
- Germany (15)
- Hungary (15)
- Iceland (15)
- Montenegro (15)
- Netherlands (15)
- Norway (30)
- Poland (15)
- Portugal (15)
- Romania (15)
- Slovenia (30)
- Spain (15)
