= Sinem Oruç =

Turkish judoka (born 2007)

Personal information
- Born: 2 May 2007 (age 19) Konya, Turkey
- Occupation: Judoka

Sport
- Country: Turkey
- Sport: Judo
- Weight class: ‍–‍70 kg

Achievements and titles
- European Champ.: R32 (2026)
Medal record
Women's judo
Representing Turkey
European U23 Championships
Bronze medal – third place	2025 Chisinau	‍–‍63 kg
European Junior Championships
Silver medal – second place	2026 Podgorica	‍–‍70 kg
World Cadets Championships
Gold medal – first place	2022 Sarajevo	‍–‍63 kg
Bronze medal – third place	2024 Lima	‍–‍63 kg
European Cadet Championships
Gold medal – first place	2022 Poreč	‍–‍63 kg
Gold medal – first place	2023 Odivelas	‍–‍63 kg
European Youth Olympic Festival
Gold medal – first place	2023 Maribor	Mixed team
Silver medal – second place	2023 Maribor	‍–‍63 kg
Mediterranean Games
Bronze medal – third place	2026 Taranto	Mixed team

Profile at external databases
- IJF: 67033
- JudoInside.com: 153377
- Updated on 3 October 2026

Sinem Oruç (born 2 May 2007) is a Turkish female judoka competing in the middleweight (‍–‍70 kg) division. She is a member of Konya BB Spor, and represents Turkey at international competitions.

== Sport career ==
Oruç won the gold medal in the –‍63 kg division at the 2022 European Cadet Championships held in Poreč, Croatia. That same year, she also won the gold medal in the –‍63 kg division at the 2022 World Cadet Championships in Sarajevo, Bosnia and Herzegovina. Additionally, she won a bronze[9 medal with the Turkish team in the mixed team event.

She won the gold medal in the –‍63 kg division at the 2023 European Cadet Championships in Odivelas, Portugal. That same year, she won the silver medal in the –‍63 kg division at the 2023 European Youth Summer Olympic Festival in Maribor, Croatia. She was part of the national mixed team, which captured the gold medaş.

In 2024, she won the European Cadet Cup tournaments in Bielsko-Biała,Poland, and Antalya, Turkey. She won a bronze medal in the –‍63 division at the 2024 World Cadet Championships in Lima, Peru.

She continued competing in the junior category in 2025. She won bronze medals at the Junior European Cups in Sarajevo, and Istanbul. In August, she won the gold medal in the –‍63 kg division at the 2025 Junior European Cup in Skopje, Northern Macedonia. She also secured a bronze medal at the 2025 European U23 Championships in Chișinău, Moldova in late October.

She won the silver medal in the ‍–‍70 kg division at 2026 European Junior Championships in Podgorica, Montenegro. As part of the mixed judo team of Turkey, she took the bronze medal in the mixed team event at the 2026 Mediterranean Games in Taranto, Italy.

== Personal life ==
Born on 2 May 2007, Sinem Oruç is a native of Konya, Turkey.
