= Yelyzaveta Lytvynenko =

Ukrainian judoka (born 2004)

Personal information
- Full name: Yelyzaveta Anatoliivna Lytvynenko
- Born: 11 February 2004 (age 22) Ordzhonikidze, Dnipropetrovsk oblast, Ukraine
- Occupation: Judoka

Sport
- Country: Ukraine (until February 2025); United Arab Emirates (since September 2025)
- Sport: Judo
- Weight class: ‍–‍78 kg
- Coached by: Serhiy Sinilov

Achievements and titles
- Olympic Games: 7th (2024)
- World Champ.: (gold) (2026)
- Asian Champ.: (silver) (2026)
Medal record
Women's judo
Representing United Arab Emirates
World Championships
Gold medal – first place	2026 Baku	‍–‍78 kg
Asian Championships
Silver medal – second place	2026 Ordos	‍–‍78 kg
IJF Grand Slam
Gold medal – first place	2026 Dushanbe	‍–‍78 kg
Gold medal – first place	2026 Ulaanbaatar	‍–‍78 kg
Gold medal – first place	2026 Abu Dhabi	‍–‍78 kg
Silver medal – second place	2026 Paris	‍–‍78 kg
Silver medal – second place	2026 Lausanne	‍–‍78 kg
IJF Grand Prix
Gold medal – first place	2025 Zagreb	‍–‍78 kg
Silver medal – second place	2025 Qingdao	‍–‍78 kg
Representing Ukraine
World Championships
Bronze medal – third place	2022 Tashkent	‍–‍78 kg
World Masters
Bronze medal – third place	2023 Budapest	‍–‍78 kg
IJF Grand Slam
Bronze medal – third place	2024 Baku	‍–‍78 kg
Bronze medal – third place	2024 Tbilisi	‍–‍78 kg
IJF Grand Prix
Silver medal – second place	2023 Almada	‍–‍78 kg
Bronze medal – third place	2023 Linz	‍–‍78 kg
Bronze medal – third place	2024 Linz	‍–‍78 kg
European Junior Championships
Gold medal – first place	2022 Prague	‍–‍78 kg
European Cadet Championships
Gold medal – first place	2021 Riga	‍–‍70 kg
European Youth Olympic Festival
Gold medal – first place	2022 Banská Bystrica	‍–‍78 kg
Silver medal – second place	2022 Banská Bystrica	Mixed team

Profile at external databases
- IJF: 50808, 94520
- JudoInside.com: 135600
- Updated on 1 November 2026

Yelyzaveta Anatoliivna Lytvynenko (Ukrainian: Єлизавета Анатоліївна Литвиненко; born 11 February 2004) is a Ukrainian-born Emirati judoka who competes in the ‍–‍78 kg division. She is the 2026 world champion and a 2022 world bronze medalist. Having competed for Ukraine until September 2025, she now represents the United Arab Emirates.

== Early life ==
She was born on 11 February 2004 in Pokrov, Ukraine. Yelyzaveta was doing diving in her childhood. Then she began her judoka career in 12.

== Career ==
Lytvynenko's first achievement in international competitions was a silver medal at the 2019 Győr Cadet European Cup in Hungary in the ‍–‍70 kg division.

Lytvynenko became a European champion at the 2021 European Cadet Championships, held in Riga, in the ‍–‍70 kg division, beating Eva Ronja Buddenkotte from Germany in the final. She also won a bronze medal at the World Military Judo Championship, held in Paris, in the ‍–‍78 kg division. In the same year, she debuted competing at the 2021 European Judo Championships and was eliminated in the first round.

The following year, Lytvynenko won a bronze medal at the 2022 World Championships in the ‍–‍78 kg division, beating the 2020 Olympic champion Shori Hamada in the bronze medal match. She also won a gold medal at the 2022 European Youth Summer Olympic Festival in the ‍–‍78 kg division and a silver in mixed team competition. That year Lytvynenko became a European Junior champion at the 2022 European Junior Championships in the ‍–‍78 kg division.

In 2023, Lytvynenko won silver at the Almada Grand Prix and a bronze at the Linz Grand Prix. Lytvynenko also received a bronze medal at the 2023 Judo World Masters in Budapest, where she qualified to the 2024 Summer Olympics. That year she competed at the 2023 European Championships, finishing in 7th place.

In 2024, Lytvynenko won bronze medals at the Baku Grand Slam, the Linz Grand Prix and the Tbilisi Grand Slam.

In September 2025, Lytvynenko officially changed her sporting nationality to represent the United Arab Emirates. The decision was primarily driven by the ongoing sports boycotts initiated by the Ministry of Youth and Sports of Ukraine and the Ukrainian Judo Federation. Following national regulations, Ukrainian teams were prohibited from competing in international tournaments that allowed Russian and Belarusian athletes to participate under their flags. Due to these restrictions, the Ukrainian national team withdrew from several major tournaments, leaving athletes with limited opportunities to compete at elite international events. Consequently, Lytvynenko, alongside several other young Ukrainian judokas, opted to switch countries. Following her transition, she integrated into the UAE women's judo program, eventually winning the country's first-ever World Judo Championship gold medal in Baku.
