= Volleyball at the 2023 European Youth Summer Olympic Festival =

- Venue: Draš Sports Centre
- Location: Maribor, Slovenia
- Dates: 24–29 July 2023
- Nations: 13

Volleyball at the 2023 European Youth Summer Olympic Festival is held in Maribor, Slovenia, from 24 to 29 July 2023.

== Schedule ==
Legend
P	Preliminary round	⅛	Round of 16	¼	Quarter-finals	½	Semi-finals	B	Bronze medal match	F	Final

Date Event	Mon 24	Tue 25	Wed 26	Thu 27	Fri 28	Sat 29	
Boys' tournament	P	P	P		½	B	F
Girls' tournament	P	P	P		½	B	F

== Medal table ==
* Host nation (Slovenia)

Rank	Nation	Gold	Silver	Bronze	Total
1	France	1	0	0	1
1	Slovenia	1	0	0	1
3	Germany	0	1	0	1
3	Italy	0	1	0	1
5	Czech Republic	0	0	1	1
5	Netherlands	0	0	1	1
Totals (6 entries)		2	2	2	6

=== Medalists ===
Event	Gold	Silver	Bronze
Boys' tournament	France	Italy	Czech Republic
Girls' tournament	Slovenia	Germany	Netherlands

== Participating nations ==
A total of 192 athletes from 13 nations competed in volleyball at the 2023 European Youth Summer Olympic Festival:

- Belgium (12)
- Croatia (12)
- Czech Republic (12)
- France (12)
- Germany (12)
- Greece (12)
- Hungary (12)
- Italy (24)
- Netherlands (12)
- Poland (24)
- Serbia (12)
- Slovenia (24)
- Turkey (12)
