= Skateboarding at the 2023 European Youth Summer Olympic Festival =

- Venue: Maribor Skatepark, Maribor
- Dates: 26–27 July 2023
- Competitors: 34 from 34 nations

Skateboarding at the 2023 European Youth Summer Olympic Festival was held in Maribor, Slovenia, from 26 to 27 July 2023. This was the first and only time the sport has been included in the Summer EYOF after making its debut at the 2020 Tokyo Olympics.

== Medal table ==
* Host nation (Slovenia)

Rank	Nation	Gold	Silver	Bronze	Total
1	France	1	0	1	2
1	Poland	1	0	1	2
3	Israel	0	2	0	2
Totals (3 entries)		2	2	2	6

== Medalists ==
Event	Gold	Silver	Bronze
Boys' Street	Max Berguin; France	Yakov Terrell; Israel	Jean Semaan; Poland
Girls' Street	Weronika Choromanska; Poland	Shani Paz; Israel	Cerise Michaud; France

== Participating nations ==
A total of 34 athletes from 20 nations competed in skateboarding at the 2023 European Youth Summer Olympic Festival:

- Austria (2)
- Belgium (2)
- Czech Republic (2)
- Denmark (2)
- Finland (1)
- France (2)
- Georgia (1)
- Germany (1)
- Greece (2)
- Israel (2)
- Italy (1)
- Latvia (2)
- Lithuania (1)
- Netherlands (2)
- Norway (2)
- Poland (2)
- Portugal (2)
- Slovenia (2)
- Spain (1)
- Switzerland (2)
