= 2024 World Judo Cadets Championships =

Judo competition

2024 Judo World Judo Cadets Championships
- Venue: Villa Deportiva Nacional
- Location: Lima, Peru
- Dates: 28 August – 1 September
- Competitors: 403 from 48 nations
- Total prize money: $100,000

Champions
- Mixed team: Japan (2nd title)

Competition at external databases
- Links: IJF • JudoInside

The 2024 World Judo Cadets Championships was held at the Villa Deportiva Nacional in Lima, Peru, from 28 August to 1 September 2024. A mixed team event took place on the competition's last day.

== Medal summary ==
=== Men's events ===
Event	Gold	Silver	Bronze
−50 kg	Aleksei Toptygin (IJF)	Yuri Pereira (BRA)	Chinkhuslen Byambasuren (MGL)
−50 kg	Aleksei Toptygin (IJF)	Yuri Pereira (BRA)	Mahammadali Husiyev (AZE)
−55 kg	Nihad Mamishov (AZE)	Bat-Enerel Batbileg (MGL)	Khazar Heydarov (UKR)
−55 kg	Nihad Mamishov (AZE)	Bat-Enerel Batbileg (MGL)	Thomas Sassi (ITA)
−60 kg	Jonathan Yang (USA)	Fuku Yamamoto (JPN)	Slava Arkhipov (IJF)
−60 kg	Jonathan Yang (USA)	Fuku Yamamoto (JPN)	Jakub Kurowski (POL)
−66 kg	Giorgi Givishvili (GEO)	Abdullakh Parchiev (IJF)	Inoyat Telmanov (UZB)
−66 kg	Giorgi Givishvili (GEO)	Abdullakh Parchiev (IJF)	Boris Jankovic (SRB)
−73 kg	Jasur Ibadli (AZE)	Timur Davidov (IJF)	Inomjon Bakhodirov (UZB)
−73 kg	Jasur Ibadli (AZE)	Timur Davidov (IJF)	Noah Boué Kossa (FRA)
−81 kg	Abu-Bakr Kantaev (IJF)	Ilia Simonov (IJF)	Mykhailo Solianyk (UKR)
−81 kg	Abu-Bakr Kantaev (IJF)	Ilia Simonov (IJF)	Mehdi Abbasov (AZE)
−90 kg	Sanzhar Yerulanuly (KAZ)	Dmytro Lebid (UKR)	Emil Jabiyev (SWE)
−90 kg	Sanzhar Yerulanuly (KAZ)	Dmytro Lebid (UKR)	Gaya Sonntag (FRA)
+90 kg	Rustem Kadzaev (IJF)	Marek-Adrian Mäsak (EST)	Nodar Kobaladze (GEO)
+90 kg	Rustem Kadzaev (IJF)	Marek-Adrian Mäsak (EST)	Kévin Nzuzi Diasivi (FRA)

=== Women's events ===
Event	Gold	Silver	Bronze
−40 kg	Aiora Martin Carriches (ESP)	Mathilde Aurel (FRA)	Sandra Walendzik (POL)
−40 kg	Aiora Martin Carriches (ESP)	Mathilde Aurel (FRA)	Aurora Ferro (ITA)
−44 kg	Patrícia Tománková (SVK)	Juliana Yamasaki (BRA)	Irene Garcia Sanchez (ESP)
−44 kg	Patrícia Tománková (SVK)	Juliana Yamasaki (BRA)	Africa Puente Lopez (ESP)
−48 kg	Clarice Ribeiro (BRA)	Jamsrangiin Anudari (MGL)	Barbara Twarowska (POL)
−48 kg	Clarice Ribeiro (BRA)	Jamsrangiin Anudari (MGL)	Nycolly Carneiro (BRA)
−52 kg	Iroha Oi (JPN)	Rafaela Rodrigues (BRA)	Elise Rustige (NED)
−52 kg	Iroha Oi (JPN)	Rafaela Rodrigues (BRA)	Nicole Marques (BRA)
−57 kg	Terbishiin Ariunzayaa (MGL)	Manon Agati-Alouache (FRA)	Evelina Bosiek (IJF)
−57 kg	Terbishiin Ariunzayaa (MGL)	Manon Agati-Alouache (FRA)	Jolina Reinhold (GER)
−63 kg	Honoka Kimura (JPN)	Hanna Zaitseva (POL)	Sinem Oruç (TUR)
−63 kg	Honoka Kimura (JPN)	Hanna Zaitseva (POL)	Amelia Ptasińska (POL)
−70 kg	Lucie Rullier (FRA)	Nika Slacek (CRO)	Nina Muteba (FRA)
−70 kg	Lucie Rullier (FRA)	Nika Slacek (CRO)	Xanne van Lijf (NED)
+70 kg	Zuzanna Banaszewska (POL)	Léonie Minkada-Caquineau (FRA)	Kristýna Kaszperová (CZE)
+70 kg	Zuzanna Banaszewska (POL)	Léonie Minkada-Caquineau (FRA)	Emma-Melis Aktas (EST)

=== Mixed ===
Event	Gold	Silver	Bronze
Mixed team	Japan	France	Brazil
Mixed team	Japan	France	Mongolia

=== Medal table ===
* Host nation (Peru)

Rank	Nation	Gold	Silver	Bronze	Total
–	International Judo Federation (IJF)	3	3	2	8
1	Japan (JPN)	3	1	0	4
2	Azerbaijan (AZE)	2	0	2	4
3	France (FRA)	1	4	4	9
4	Brazil (BRA)	1	3	3	7
5	Mongolia (MGL)	1	2	2	5
6	Poland (POL)	1	1	4	6
7	Spain (ESP)	1	0	2	3
8	Georgia (GEO)	1	0	1	2
9	Kazakhstan (KAZ)	1	0	0	1
9	Slovakia (SVK)	1	0	0	1
9	United States (USA)	1	0	0	1
12	Ukraine (UKR)	0	1	2	3
13	Estonia (EST)	0	1	1	2
14	Croatia (CRO)	0	1	0	1
15	Italy (ITA)	0	0	2	2
15	Netherlands (NED)	0	0	2	2
15	Uzbekistan (UZB)	0	0	2	2
18	Czech Republic (CZE)	0	0	1	1
18	Germany (GER)	0	0	1	1
18	Serbia (SRB)	0	0	1	1
18	Sweden (SWE)	0	0	1	1
18	Turkey (TUR)	0	0	1	1
Totals (22 entries)		17	17	34	68

== Prize money ==
The sums written are per medalist, bringing the total prizes awarded to $80,000 for the individual contests and $20,000 for the team competition. (retrieved from:)

Medal	Individual			Mixed team		
Medal	Total	Judoka	Coach	Total	Judoka	Coach
Gold	$2,300	$1,840	$460	$8,000	$6,400	$1,600
Silver	$1,300	$1,040	$260	$5,600	$4,480	$1,120
Bronze	$700	$560	$140	$3,200	$2,560	$640
