= 2023 European Youth Summer Olympic Festival =

- Host city: Maribor
- Country: Slovenia
- Motto: One City, One Heart (Slovene: Eno mesto, eno srce)
- Nations: 48
- Athletes: 2,419
- Sport: 10 sports
- Events: 122
- Opening: 23 July 2023
- Closing: 29 July 2023
- Opened by: Nataša Pirc Musar
- Torch lighter: Tim Marovt
- Main venue: Ljudski vrt (opening ceremony)
- Website: eyof-maribor.com

Summer

Winter

The 2023 European Youth Summer Olympic Festival or simply EYOF 2023, also known as Maribor 2023, was the 17th edition of the European Youth Summer Olympic Festival, held from 23 to 29 July 2023 in Maribor, Slovenia. The festival was originally supposed to take place in Koper, Slovenia. In June 2021, Maribor was announced as the new host city after Koper withdrew its candidacy.

== Sports ==
The following competitions took place:

2023 European Youth Summer Olympic Festival Sports program
- 3x3 basketball
- Artistic gymnastics
- Athletics
- Cycling
- Handball
- Judo
- Skateboarding
- Swimming
- Tennis
- Volleyball

== Schedule ==
The competition schedule for the 2023 European Youth Olympic Summer Festival was as follows:

OC	Opening ceremony	1	Event finals	CC	Closing ceremony	●	Event competitions

July	23 Sun	24 Mon	25 Tue	26 Wed	27 Thu	28 Fri	29 Sat	Events
Ceremonies	OC						CC	
3x3 basketball			●	●	●	2		2
Artistic gymnastics			2	2	1	5	5	15
Athletics		2	7	6	8	8	9	40
Handball		●	●	●		●	2	2
Judo			4	4	4	4	1	17
Mountain biking				2				2
Road cycling			2		2			4
Skateboarding				●	2			2
Swimming		2	8	6	5	11		32
Tennis	●	●	●	●	●	●	4	4
Volleyball		●	●	●		●	2	2
Total events		4	23	20	22	30	23	122
Cumulative total		4	27	47	69	99	122	122
July	23 Sun	24 Mon	25 Tue	26 Wed	27 Thu	28 Fri	29 Sat	Events

== Medal table ==
* Host nation (Slovenia)

Rank	Nation	Gold	Silver	Bronze	Total
1	Italy	16	18	12	46
2	Germany	11	11	9	31
3	France	9	6	9	24
4	Romania	9	6	5	20
5	Czech Republic	9	4	7	20
6	Hungary	8	5	10	23
7	Great Britain	7	10	7	24
8	Turkey	6	6	2	14
9	Poland	6	3	6	15
10	Spain	4	6	7	17
11	Switzerland	4	2	1	7
12	Norway	3	4	3	10
13	Azerbaijan	3	3	4	10
14	Georgia	3	2	3	8
15	Croatia	3	2	0	5
16	Greece	2	6	5	13
17	Slovenia*	2	2	5	9
18	Austria	2	2	3	7
19	Serbia	2	1	5	8
20	Netherlands	2	0	6	8
21	Slovakia	2	0	3	5
22	Armenia	2	0	2	4
23	Ukraine	1	5	6	12
24	Estonia	1	3	4	8
25	Finland	1	3	3	7
26	Sweden	1	2	2	5
27	Belgium	1	1	2	4
28	Bulgaria	1	1	1	3
29	Portugal	1	0	4	5
30	Denmark	1	0	0	1
31	Israel	0	5	0	5
32	Lithuania	0	2	2	4
33	Ireland	0	1	1	2
34	Moldova	0	0	1	1
34	Montenegro	0	0	1	1
Totals (35 entries)		123	122	141	386

== Participating nations ==
48 countries and one independent athlete participated in the event. As a result of the Russian invasion of Ukraine, the European Olympic Committees has taken a decision to not invite athletes from Russia and Belarus to the European Youth Summer Olympic Festival.

- Albania (7)
- Andorra (4)
- Armenia (22)
- Austria (50)
- Azerbaijan (36)
- Belgium (62)
- Bosnia and Herzegovina (9)
- Bulgaria (18)
- Croatia (74) (details)
- Cyprus (34)
- Czech Republic (96)
- Denmark (25)
- EOC Refugee Team (1)
- Estonia (51)
- Finland (66)
- France (101)
- Georgia (31)
- Germany (109)
- Great Britain (39)
- Greece (67)
- Hungary (104)
- Iceland (35)
- Ireland (44)
- Israel (52)
- Italy (99)
- Kosovo (19)
- Latvia (47)
- Liechtenstein (3)
- Lithuania (53)
- Luxembourg (19)
- Malta (3)
- Moldova (25)
- Monaco (5)
- Montenegro (19)
- Netherlands (69)
- North Macedonia (4)
- Norway (66)
- Poland (122)
- Portugal (73)
- Romania (93)
- San Marino (6)
- Serbia (51)
- Slovakia (48)
- Slovenia (138) (host)
- Spain (81)
- Sweden (39)
- Switzerland (71)
- Turkey (79)
- Ukraine (55)
