= Yuli Alma Mishiner =

Israeli judoka (born 2005)

Personal information
- Native name: יולי עלמה מישינר
- Born: 27 September 2005 (age 20)
- Occupation: Judoka

Sport
- Country: Israel
- Sport: Judo
- Weight class: +78 kg
- Rank: 1st dan black belt
- Club: Otzma Merkaz Petah Tikva

Achievements and titles
- European Champ.: 7th (2026)
- Highest world ranking: 10^{th}
Medal record
Women's judo
Representing Israel
IJF Grand Slam
Bronze medal – third place	2025 Abu Dhabi	+78 kg
Bronze medal – third place	2026 Lausanne	+78 kg
IJF Grand Prix
Silver medal – second place	2024 Zagreb	+78 kg
Bronze medal – third place	2025 Lima	+78 kg
Bronze medal – third place	2026 Linz	+78 kg
European U23 Championships
Gold medal – first place	2024 Piła	+78 kg
World Juniors Championships
Bronze medal – third place	2025 Lima	+78 kg
European Junior Championships
Bronze medal – third place	2023 The Hague	+78 kg
Bronze medal – third place	2024 Tallinn	+78 kg
Bronze medal – third place	2025 Bratislava	+78 kg
European Cadet Championships
Silver medal – second place	2021 Riga	+70 kg
Silver medal – second place	2022 Poreč	+70 kg
European Youth Olympic Festival
Silver medal – second place	2022 Banská Bystrica	‍–‍78 kg
Bronze medal – third place	2022 Banská Bystrica	Mixed team

Profile at external databases
- IJF: 64647
- JudoInside.com: 89614
- Updated on 31 August 2026

Yuli Alma Mishiner (Hebrew: יולי עלמה מישינר; born 27 September 2005) is an Israeli judoka.

Mishiner won the gold medal at the 2024 European U23 Judo Championships.
