= Bernadett Baczkó =

Hungarian Olympic judoka

Personal information
- Nationality: Hungarian
- Born: 8 January 1986 (age 40) Budapest, Hungary
- Occupation: Judoka
- Height: 1.64 m (5 ft 4 1/2 in)
- Weight: 60 kg (132 lb)

Sport
- Country: Hungary
- Sport: Judo
- Weight class: –57 kg
- Club: KSI Budapest
- Coached by: Gabor Pánczél

Achievements and titles
- Olympic Games: 7th (2008)
- World Champ.: (bronze) (2007)
- European Champ.: R16 (2013)
Medal record
Women's judo
Representing Hungary
World Championships
Bronze medal – third place	2007 Rio de Janeiro	–57 kg
IJF Grand Prix
Bronze medal – third place	2009 Tunis	–57 kg
European U23 Championships
Gold medal – first place	2007 Salzburg	–57 kg
Gold medal – first place	2008 Zagreb	–57 kg
Silver medal – second place	2003 Yerevan	–57 kg
Bronze medal – third place	2005 Kyiv	–57 kg
Bronze medal – third place	2006 Moscow	–57 kg
European Junior Championships
Gold medal – first place	2004 Sofia	–57 kg
Silver medal – second place	2003 Sarajevo	–57 kg
Silver medal – second place	2005 Zagreb	–57 kg
European Cadet Championships
Gold medal – first place	2002 Győr	–57 kg

Profile at external databases
- IJF: 4208
- JudoInside.com: 16413
- Updated on 9 February 2022

Bernadett Baczkó (born 8 January 1986 in Budapest) is a Hungarian judoka, who played for the lightweight category.

She is a nine-time national champion, and a five-time medalist at the European Junior Championships. She also won the bronze medal for the same division at the 2007 World Judo Championships in Rio de Janeiro, Brazil.

Baczko represented Hungary at the 2008 Summer Olympics in Beijing, where she competed for the women's lightweight class (57 kg). She reached only into the second preliminary round, where she lost by a waza-ari (half-point) to Hungarian-born Australian judoka and five-time Olympian Mária Pekli. Because her opponent advanced further into the semi-finals, Baczko offered another shot for the bronze medal by defeating Tunisia's Nesria Jelassi, with an automatic ippon and kuzure kesa gatame (seven mat holds), in the repechage bout. Unfortunately, she finished only in seventh place, after losing out the final repechage bout to France's Barbara Harel, who successfully scored a waza-ari, eighteen seconds before the five-minute period had ended.
