= Avisar Sheinmann =

Israeli judoka (born 1982)

Personal information
- Native name: אבישר שיינמן
- Born: 26 April 1982 (age 44)
- Occupation: Judoka

Sport
- Country: Israel
- Sport: Judo
- Weight class: ‍–‍81 kg
- Rank: 5th dan black belt

Achievements and titles
- World Champ.: R16 (2007)
- European Champ.: 5th (2008)
Medal record
Men's judo
Representing Israel
European Championships
Gold medal – first place	2005 Debrecen	Men's team
Maccabiah Games
Silver medal – second place	2009 Tel Aviv	‍–‍81 kg

Profile at external databases
- IJF: 3552
- JudoInside.com: 36810
- Updated on 5 January 2025

Avisar Sheinmann (Hebrew: אבישר שיינמן; born 26 April 1982) is an Israeli judoka.

== Achievements ==
Year	Tournament	Place	Weight class
2007	European Championships	7th	Half middleweight (81 kg)
2008	European Championships	5th	Half middleweight (81 kg)
