= Linthoi Chanambam =

Indian judoka

Personal information
- Occupation: Judoka

Sport
- Country: India
- Sport: Judo
- Weight class: ‍–‍57 kg, ‍–‍63 kg
Medal record
Women's judo
Representing India
World Juniors Championships
Bronze medal – third place	2025 Lima	‍–‍63 kg
Asian Junior Championships
Gold medal – first place	2026 Amman	‍–‍63 kg
Silver medal – second place	2021 Beirut	‍–‍57 kg
Bronze medal – third place	2025 Jakarta	‍–‍63 kg
World Cadets Championships
Gold medal – first place	2022 Sarajevo	‍–‍57 kg
Asian Cadet Championships
Gold medal – first place	2022 Bangkok	‍–‍57 kg
Bronze medal – third place	2021 Beirut	‍–‍57 kg

Profile at external databases
- IJF: 65266
- JudoInside.com: 156350
- Updated on 7 October 2025

Linthoi Chanambam is an Indian judoka who won the gold medal in the 2022 World Judo Cadets Championships at Sarajevo in the 57 kg women's event. She hails from Manipur state in India. She became the first ever Indian medalist in any age category of the World Championships.

Chanambam won a gold medal at the 2022 Asian Cadet Championships and bronze medals at both the 2021 Asian Junior and Cadet Championships.
