= Gal Yekutiel =

Israeli judoka (born 1981)

Personal information
- Native name: גל יקותיאל
- Born: 4 November 1981 (age 44)
- Occupation: Judoka

Sport
- Country: Israel
- Sport: Judo
- Weight class: ‍–‍60 kg

Achievements and titles
- Olympic Games: 5th (2008)
- World Champ.: 7th (2005)
- European Champ.: (bronze) (2007)
Medal record
Men's judo
Representing Israel
European Championships
Gold medal – first place	2005 Debrecen	Men's team
Bronze medal – third place	2007 Belgrade	‍–‍60 kg
European Junior Championships
Bronze medal – third place	2000 Nicosia	‍–‍60 kg
Maccabiah Games
Gold medal – first place	2005 Tel Aviv	‍–‍60 kg

Profile at external databases
- IJF: 19685
- JudoInside.com: 12669
- Updated on 17 February 2022

Gal Yekutiel (Hebrew: גל יקותיאל; born November 4, 1981, in Jerusalem, Israel) is an Israeli judoka. He competes in the extra lightweight (under 60 kg) weight category.

== Biography ==
He has represented Israel in the Olympic Games of 2004 and 2008. In the latter, he ranked 5th after losing the bout for the bronze medal. His other major achievement was a bronze medal at the 2007 European Championships.

== Achievements ==
Year	Tournament	Place	Weight class	ref.
2008	Beijing Olympic	5th	Extra lightweight (60 kg)	
2008	European Championships	5th	Extra lightweight (60 kg)	
2007	European Championships	3rd	Extra lightweight (60 kg)	
2005	Maccabiah Games	1st	Extra lightweight (60 kg)	
