= Andrian Kordon =

Israeli judoka (born 1977)

Personal information
- Native name: אנדריאן קורדון
- Born: 24 May 1977 (age 49)
- Occupation: Judoka

Sport
- Country: Israel
- Sport: Judo
- Weight class: +100 kg

Achievements and titles
- World Champ.: 7th (2005)
- European Champ.: (bronze) (2005)
Medal record
Men's judo
Representing Israel
European Championships
Gold medal – first place	2005 Debrecen	Men's team
Bronze medal – third place	2005 Rotterdam	+100 kg

Profile at external databases
- IJF: 58796
- JudoInside.com: 7046
- Updated on 6 February 2022

Andrian Kordon (Hebrew: אנדריאן קורדון; born 24 May 1977) was an Israeli judoka.

== Achievements ==
Year	Tournament	Place	Weight class	Ref.
2004	European Championships	7th	Heavyweight (+100 kg)	
2005	European Championships	3rd	Heavyweight (+100 kg)	
2005	European Team Championships	1st	Team	
2005	World Championships	7th	Heavyweight (+100 kg)	
