= Yoel Razvozov =

Israeli judoka and politician

Ministerial roles
- 2021–2022: Minister of Tourism

Faction represented in the Knesset
- 2013–2019: Yesh Atid
- 2019–2020: Blue and White
- 2020–2021: Yesh Atid
- 2022–2023: Yesh Atid

Personal details
- Born: 5 July 1980 (age 46) Birobidzhan, Soviet Union
- Judo career
- Country: Israel
- Weight class: ‍–‍73 kg
- Rank: Black belt

Judo achievements and titles
- Olympic Games: 9th (2004)
- World Champ.: 7th (2003)
- European Champ.: (silver) (2004, 2005)
Medal record
Men's judo
Representing Israel
European Championships
Gold medal – first place	2005 Debrecen	Men's team
Silver medal – second place	2004 Bucharest	‍–‍73 kg
Silver medal – second place	2005 Rotterdam	‍–‍73 kg
IJF Grand Slam
Bronze medal – third place	2009 Rio de Janeiro	‍–‍73 kg

Profile at external judo databases
- IJF: 857
- JudoInside.com: 11270
- Updated on 17 February 2025

Yoel Razvozov (Hebrew: יוֹאֵל רַזְבוֹזוֹב; born 5 July 1980) is an Israeli politician and judoka. He served as the Minister of Tourism from 2021 to 2022 and a member of the Knesset for Yesh Atid for ten years in several parliamentary sessions.

== Early life ==
Born Konstantin Anatolyevich Razvozov (Russian: Константин Анатольевич Развозов) in Birobidzhan in the Jewish Autonomous Oblast of the Soviet Union, Razvozov began training in judo at age 6. His family emigrated to Israel when he was 11, in 1991, at the dissolution of the Soviet Union. He joined the Israeli judo team and became an Israeli judo champion at the age of 16.

== Athletic career ==
In 2001 Razvozov became the youngest Israeli judoka to win the European World cup in Austria. In the 2003 World Championships, Razvozov finished seventh. He was the youngest National team captain in history of Israeli judo. Razvozov finish second at the 2004 European Championships the following year, and represented Israel at the 2004 Summer Olympics, finishing 9th at the men's 73 kg event. At the 2005 European Championships, he again won a silver medal in the 73 kg weight category.

== Political career ==
Razvozov entered politics, becoming a member of Netanya City Council. He also became a member of the Israel Olympics Committee. He joined Yesh Atid and was placed eighth on its list for the 2013 Knesset elections. He was elected to the Knesset as the party won 19 seats. He was placed ninth on the party's list for the 2015 elections, and was re-elected as the party won 11 seats. Razvozov remained a member of the Knesset until 2021, when he resigned under the Norwegian Law to become the Minister of Tourism, a position he held until December 2022.

Following the end of his tenure as Minister of Tourism, on 23 January 2023, Razvozov announced his intention to resign from the Knesset and retire from politics.

== Athletic achievements ==
Year	Tournament	Place	Weight class	Ref.
2002	European Judo Championships	5th	Lightweight (73 kg)	
2003	World Judo Championships	7th	Lightweight (73 kg)	
2004	European Judo Championships	2nd	Lightweight (73 kg)	
2004	Summer Olympics	9th	Lightweight (73 kg)	
2005	European Judo Championships	2nd	Lightweight (73 kg)	
2005	European Judo Team Championships	1st	Team	
2009	Grand Slam Rio de Janeiro	3rd	Lightweight (73 kg)	
