= 2024 European Junior Judo Championships =

Judo competition

Judo 2024 European Junior Judo Championships
- Venue: Unibet Arena
- Location: Tallinn, Estonia
- Dates: 5–8 September 2024
- Competitors: 373 from 39 nations

Champions
- Mixed team: Azerbaijan (1st title)

Competition at external databases
- Links: IJF • JudoInside

The 2024 European Junior Judo Championships was held at the Unibet Arena in Tallinn, Estonia, from 5 to 8 September 2024. The last day of competition featured a mixed team event.

== Medal summary ==
=== Men's events ===
Event	Gold	Silver	Bronze
Extra-lightweight (−60 kg)	Nazar Viskov (UKR)	Nizami Imranov (AZE)	Ksawery Ignasiak (POL)
Extra-lightweight (−60 kg)	Nazar Viskov (UKR)	Nizami Imranov (AZE)	Zacharie Dijol (FRA)
Half-lightweight (−66 kg)	Valerio Accogli (ITA)	Alessio De Luca (ITA)	Gal Kloda (ISR)
Half-lightweight (−66 kg)	Valerio Accogli (ITA)	Alessio De Luca (ITA)	Alexis Renard (FRA)
Lightweight (−73 kg)	Vusal Galandarzade (AZE)	Dimitar Gospodinov (BUL)	Victor Skerlev (BUL)
Lightweight (−73 kg)	Vusal Galandarzade (AZE)	Dimitar Gospodinov (BUL)	Stanislav Rybin (ESP)
Half-middleweight (−81 kg)	Suleyman Shukurov (AZE)	Aleksandre Loladze (GEO)	Luka Javakhishvili (GEO)
Half-middleweight (−81 kg)	Suleyman Shukurov (AZE)	Aleksandre Loladze (GEO)	Igor Tsurkan (UKR)
Middleweight (−90 kg)	Miljan Radulj (SRB)	Aslan Kotsoev (AZE)	Ivan Kutenkov (UKR)
Middleweight (−90 kg)	Miljan Radulj (SRB)	Aslan Kotsoev (AZE)	Tuncay Shamil (AZE)
Half-heavyweight (−100 kg)	Milan Bulaja (SRB)	Jakob Vares (EST)	Maxence Bordin (FRA)
Half-heavyweight (−100 kg)	Milan Bulaja (SRB)	Jakob Vares (EST)	Joës Schell (NED)
Heavyweight (+100 kg)	İbrahim Tataroğlu (TUR)	Davit Kevlishvili (ESP)	Mortaza Suha (GER)
Heavyweight (+100 kg)	İbrahim Tataroğlu (TUR)	Davit Kevlishvili (ESP)	Kanan Nasibov (AZE)

Source results:

=== Women's events ===
Event	Gold	Silver	Bronze
Extra-lightweight (−48 kg)	Konul Aliyeva (AZE)	Zilan Ertem (TUR)	Morgane Annis (FRA)
Extra-lightweight (−48 kg)	Konul Aliyeva (AZE)	Zilan Ertem (TUR)	Laura Bogdan (ROU)
Half-lightweight (−52 kg)	Nikolina Nišavić (SRB)	Kinga Klimczak (POL)	Luca Mamira (HUN)
Half-lightweight (−52 kg)	Nikolina Nišavić (SRB)	Kinga Klimczak (POL)	Tabea Mecklenburg (GER)
Lightweight (−57 kg)	Fidan Alizada (AZE)	Nino Loladze (GEO)	Michela Terranova (ITA)
Lightweight (−57 kg)	Fidan Alizada (AZE)	Nino Loladze (GEO)	Adriana Saez Hevia (ESP)
Half-middleweight (−63 kg)	Sara-Joy Bauer (GER)	Joni Geilen (NED)	Anna Skalská (CZE)
Half-middleweight (−63 kg)	Sara-Joy Bauer (GER)	Joni Geilen (NED)	Melkia Auchecorne (FRA)
Middleweight (−70 kg)	April Lynn Fohouo (SUI)	Teophila Darbes-Takam (FRA)	Tanja Gruenewald (GER)
Middleweight (−70 kg)	April Lynn Fohouo (SUI)	Teophila Darbes-Takam (FRA)	Aleksandra Andrić (SRB)
Half-heavyweight (−78 kg)	Lila Mazzarino (FRA)	Jovana Stjepanović (SRB)	Fábia Conceição (POR)
Half-heavyweight (−78 kg)	Lila Mazzarino (FRA)	Jovana Stjepanović (SRB)	Mathilda Sophie Niemeyer (GER)
Heavyweight (+78 kg)	Célia Cancan (FRA)	Emma-Melis Aktas (EST)	Marcelina Vranjes (CRO)
Heavyweight (+78 kg)	Célia Cancan (FRA)	Emma-Melis Aktas (EST)	Yuli Alma Mishiner (ISR)

Source results:

=== Mixed ===
Event	Gold	Silver	Bronze
Mixed team	Azerbaijan	France	Netherlands
Mixed team	Azerbaijan	France	Serbia

Source results:

=== Medal table ===
* Host nation (Estonia)

Rank	Nation	Gold	Silver	Bronze	Total
1	Azerbaijan (AZE)	5	2	2	9
2	Serbia (SRB)	3	1	2	6
3	France (FRA)	2	2	5	9
4	Italy (ITA)	1	1	1	3
5	Turkey (TUR)	1	1	0	2
6	Germany (GER)	1	0	4	5
7	Ukraine (UKR)	1	0	2	3
8	Switzerland (SUI)	1	0	0	1
9	Georgia (GEO)	0	2	1	3
10	Estonia (EST)*	0	2	0	2
11	Netherlands (NED)	0	1	2	3
11	Spain (ESP)	0	1	2	3
13	Bulgaria (BUL)	0	1	1	2
13	Poland (POL)	0	1	1	2
15	Israel (ISR)	0	0	2	2
16	Croatia (CRO)	0	0	1	1
16	Czech Republic (CZE)	0	0	1	1
16	Hungary (HUN)	0	0	1	1
16	Portugal (POR)	0	0	1	1
16	Romania (ROU)	0	0	1	1
Totals (20 entries)		15	15	30	60
