= 2024 European U23 Judo Championships =

Judo competition

Judo 2024 European U23 Judo Championships
- Venue: MOSiR Hall in Piła
- Location: Piła, Poland
- Dates: 15–17 November 2024
- Competitors: 321 from 36 nations

Champions
- Mixed team: Georgia (2nd title)

Competition at external databases
- Links: IJF • JudoInside

The 2024 European U23 Judo Championships was held at the MOSiR Sports Hall in Piła, Poland, from 15 to 17 November 2024 The last day of competition featured a mixed team event.

== Medal summary ==
=== Men's events ===
Event	Gold	Silver	Bronze
Extra-lightweight (−60 kg)	Huseyn Allahyarov (AZE)	Jakub Kurowski (POL)	Ashik Andreyan (ARM)
Extra-lightweight (−60 kg)	Huseyn Allahyarov (AZE)	Jakub Kurowski (POL)	Marko Jorgić (SRB)
Half-lightweight (−66 kg)	Giuseppe De Tullio (ITA)	Federico Ninfo (ITA)	Boyan Yotov (BUL)
Half-lightweight (−66 kg)	Giuseppe De Tullio (ITA)	Federico Ninfo (ITA)	Tengo Zirakashvili (GEO)
Lightweight (−73 kg)	Giorgi Terashvili (GEO)	Dániel Szegedi (HUN)	Áron Szabó (HUN)
Lightweight (−73 kg)	Giorgi Terashvili (GEO)	Dániel Szegedi (HUN)	Rufat Shovlatov (AZE)
Half-middleweight (−81 kg)	Kote Kapanadze (GEO)	Bright Maddaloni Nosa (ITA)	Magamed Borchashvilli (AUT)
Half-middleweight (−81 kg)	Kote Kapanadze (GEO)	Bright Maddaloni Nosa (ITA)	Omar Rajabli (AZE)
Middleweight (−90 kg)	Mihail Latișev (MDA)	Ian van Herk (NED)	Miljan Radulj (SRB)
Middleweight (−90 kg)	Mihail Latișev (MDA)	Ian van Herk (NED)	Lars van Oostrum (NED)
Half-heavyweight (−100 kg)	Lars Vissers (NED)	Viktor Adam (SVK)	Benjamín Maťašeje (SVK)
Half-heavyweight (−100 kg)	Lars Vissers (NED)	Viktor Adam (SVK)	Nikita Yudanov (UKR)
Heavyweight (+100 kg)	Irakli Demetrashvili (GEO)	Grzegorz Teresiński (POL)	Marek-Adrian Mäsak (EST)
Heavyweight (+100 kg)	Irakli Demetrashvili (GEO)	Grzegorz Teresiński (POL)	Daniel Udsilauri (GER)

Source results:

=== Women's events ===
Event	Gold	Silver	Bronze
Extra-lightweight (−48 kg)	Tara Babulfath (SWE)	Giulia Ghiglione (ITA)	Gema Gómez (ESP)
Extra-lightweight (−48 kg)	Tara Babulfath (SWE)	Giulia Ghiglione (ITA)	Asia Avanzato (ITA)
Half-lightweight (−52 kg)	Ayumi Leiva Sánchez (ESP)	Aydan Valiyeva (AZE)	Erza Muminoviq (KOS)
Half-lightweight (−52 kg)	Ayumi Leiva Sánchez (ESP)	Aydan Valiyeva (AZE)	Luca Mamira (HUN)
Lightweight (−57 kg)	Fidan Alizada (AZE)	Nino Loladze (GEO)	Marta García (ESP)
Lightweight (−57 kg)	Fidan Alizada (AZE)	Nino Loladze (GEO)	Pihla Salonen (FIN)
Half-middleweight (−63 kg)	Laura Vázquez (ESP)	Alessia Corrao (BEL)	Florentina Ivănescu (ROU)
Half-middleweight (−63 kg)	Laura Vázquez (ESP)	Alessia Corrao (BEL)	Carlotta Avanzato (ITA)
Middleweight (−70 kg)	Elena Dengg (AUT)	Samira Bock (GER)	Aleksandra Kowalewska (POL)
Middleweight (−70 kg)	Elena Dengg (AUT)	Samira Bock (GER)	Gaya Bar Or (ISR)
Half-heavyweight (−78 kg)	Yael van Heemst (NED)	Maria Hanstede (NED)	Yuliia Kurchenko (UKR)
Half-heavyweight (−78 kg)	Yael van Heemst (NED)	Maria Hanstede (NED)	Zuzanna Banaszewska (POL)
Heavyweight (+78 kg)	Yuli Alma Mishiner (ISR)	Diana Semchenko (UKR)	Oxana Diacenco (MDA)
Heavyweight (+78 kg)	Yuli Alma Mishiner (ISR)	Diana Semchenko (UKR)	Erica Simonetti (ITA)

Source results:

=== Mixed ===
Event	Gold	Silver	Bronze
Mixed team	Georgia	Ukraine	Netherlands
Mixed team	Georgia	Ukraine	Germany

Source results:

=== Medal table ===
* Host nation (Poland)

Rank	Nation	Gold	Silver	Bronze	Total
1	Georgia (GEO)	4	1	1	6
2	Netherlands (NED)	2	2	2	6
3	Azerbaijan (AZE)	2	1	2	5
4	Spain (ESP)	2	0	2	4
5	Italy (ITA)	1	3	3	7
6	Austria (AUT)	1	0	1	2
6	Israel (ISR)	1	0	1	2
6	Moldova (MDA)	1	0	1	2
9	Sweden (SWE)	1	0	0	1
10	Poland (POL)*	0	2	2	4
10	Ukraine (UKR)	0	2	2	4
12	Germany (GER)	0	1	2	3
12	Hungary (HUN)	0	1	2	3
14	Slovakia (SVK)	0	1	1	2
15	Belgium (BEL)	0	1	0	1
16	Serbia (SRB)	0	0	2	2
17	Armenia (ARM)	0	0	1	1
17	Bulgaria (BUL)	0	0	1	1
17	Estonia (EST)	0	0	1	1
17	Finland (FIN)	0	0	1	1
17	Kosovo (KOS)	0	0	1	1
17	Romania (ROU)	0	0	1	1
Totals (22 entries)		15	15	30	60
