= Judo at the 2025 European Youth Summer Olympic Festival =

Judo Judo at the 2025 European Youth Summer Olympic Festival
- Venue: Jane Sandanski Arena
- Location: Skopje, North Macedonia
- Dates: 22–26 July
- Competitors: 338 from 44 nations
- Website: Official website

Competition at external databases
- Links: IJF • JudoInside

The Judo event at the 2025 European Youth Summer Olympic Festival will be held at the Jane Sandanski Arena arena in Skopje, North Macedonia, from 22 to 26 July 2025. An NOC may be represented by up to 12 athletes, given that no more than 1 of them participates in any weight class. The final day of competition will feature a mixed team event.

== Schedule ==
All times are local (UTC+2).

	Date	Weight classes	Preliminaries	Final Block
Day 1	22 July	Boys: −55, −60 Girls: −44, −48	12:30	TBD
Day 2	23 July	Boys: −66, −73 Girls: −52, −57	09:30	TBD
Day 3	24 July	Boys: −81, −90 Girls: −63, −70	09:30	TBD
Day 4	25 July	Boys: −100, +100 Girls: −78, +78	10:30	TBD
Day 5	26 July	Mixed team	TBD	TBD

== Medal table ==
* Host nation (North Macedonia)

Rank	Nation	Gold	Silver	Bronze	Total
1	Serbia (SRB)	4	0	2	6
2	Azerbaijan (AZE)	3	2	3	8
3	Ukraine (UKR)	2	1	3	6
4	France (FRA)	2	1	2	5
5	Lithuania (LTU)	2	0	1	3
6	Germany (GER)	1	2	1	4
7	Belgium (BEL)	1	1	1	3
8	Spain (ESP)	1	1	0	2
9	Hungary (HUN)	1	0	3	4
10	Georgia (GEO)	0	2	4	6
11	Croatia (CRO)	0	2	1	3
12	Turkey (TUR)	0	2	0	2
13	Netherlands (NED)	0	1	1	2
14	Israel (ISR)	0	1	0	1
14	Sweden (SWE)	0	1	0	1
16	Romania (ROU)	0	0	3	3
17	Moldova (MDA)	0	0	2	2
17	Poland (POL)	0	0	2	2
19	Armenia (ARM)	0	0	1	1
19	Czech Republic (CZE)	0	0	1	1
19	Denmark (DEN)	0	0	1	1
19	Kosovo (KOS)	0	0	1	1
19	Switzerland (SUI)	0	0	1	1
Totals (23 entries)		17	17	34	68

== Medal summary ==
=== Boys ===
Event	Gold	Silver	Bronze
–50 kg	Rza Khalilli; Azerbaijan	Alejandro Chiarroni Cutillas; Spain	Saba Bolkvadze; Georgia
–50 kg	Rza Khalilli; Azerbaijan	Alejandro Chiarroni Cutillas; Spain	Axel Cuq; France
–55 kg	Rasul Alizada; Azerbaijan	Kristian Butuci; Croatia	Alin Marian Sorici; Romania
–55 kg	Rasul Alizada; Azerbaijan	Kristian Butuci; Croatia	Silvano Cori; Switzerland
–60 kg	Khazar Heydarov; Ukraine	Zeyd Alasgarov; Azerbaijan	Vakhtangi Tchiaberashvili; Georgia
–60 kg	Khazar Heydarov; Ukraine	Zeyd Alasgarov; Azerbaijan	Ferenc Fedora; Hungary
–66 kg	Boris Jankovic; Serbia	Tyn Zwiers; Netherlands	Zygimantas Karalevicius; Lithuania
–66 kg	Boris Jankovic; Serbia	Tyn Zwiers; Netherlands	Illia Nazarenko; Ukraine
–73 kg	Veljko Varničić; Serbia	Vasil Gamezardashvili; Georgia	Tigran Sarukhanyan; Armenia
–73 kg	Veljko Varničić; Serbia	Vasil Gamezardashvili; Georgia	Mahammad Aghakishiyev; Azerbaijan
–81 kg	Tajus Babaičenko; Lithuania	Mykhailo Solianyk; Ukraine	Giorgi Mumladze; Georgia
–81 kg	Tajus Babaičenko; Lithuania	Mykhailo Solianyk; Ukraine	Konstantin Distel; Germany
–90 kg	Majus Genys; Lithuania	Giorgi Surabaschwili; Georgia	Artur Makarenko; Ukraine
–90 kg	Majus Genys; Lithuania	Giorgi Surabaschwili; Georgia	Sieb Griede; Netherlands
+90 kg	Daniel Csermák; Hungary	Azriel Dekenne Diffo; France	Ioane Abalaki; Georgia
+90 kg	Daniel Csermák; Hungary	Azriel Dekenne Diffo; France	Subhan Akhundov; Azerbaijan

=== Girls ===
Event	Gold	Silver	Bronze
–40 kg	Fenne Peeters; Belgium	Yağmur Yılmaztürk; Turkey	Julia Błaszczyk; Poland
–40 kg	Fenne Peeters; Belgium	Yağmur Yılmaztürk; Turkey	Nóra Takács; Hungary
–44 kg	Gulshan Huseynova; Azerbaijan	Yuval Gabay; Israel	Viktoria Grigoryan; Belgium
–44 kg	Gulshan Huseynova; Azerbaijan	Yuval Gabay; Israel	Denisa Serban; Romania
–48 kg	Céline Iddir; France	Nurana Hajizada; Azerbaijan	Viktoria Kiss; Hungary
–48 kg	Céline Iddir; France	Nurana Hajizada; Azerbaijan	Gabriela Herta; Moldova
–52 kg	Mónica Martínez de Rituerto; Spain	Hannah Glauner; Germany	Aysun Mammadova; Azerbaijan
–52 kg	Mónica Martínez de Rituerto; Spain	Hannah Glauner; Germany	Alexandra Chiron; Moldova
–57 kg	Jolina Reinhold; Germany	Hanna Babulfath; Sweden	Enise Zijade; Kosovo
–57 kg	Jolina Reinhold; Germany	Hanna Babulfath; Sweden	Julia Siemko; Poland
–63 kg	Ilariia Tsurkan; Ukraine	Rümeysa Hatice Kılıçkaya; Turkey	Ingrid Constanze Komodowski; Denmark
–63 kg	Ilariia Tsurkan; Ukraine	Rümeysa Hatice Kılıçkaya; Turkey	Nina Andrić; Serbia
–70 kg	Aleksandra Andrić; Serbia	Valerie Tombou; Belgium	Isabel Bob; Romania
–70 kg	Aleksandra Andrić; Serbia	Valerie Tombou; Belgium	Ana Bešker; Croatia
+70 kg	Emma Feuillet-Nguimgo; France	Antea Ajduković; Croatia	Milica Radaković; Serbia
+70 kg	Emma Feuillet-Nguimgo; France	Antea Ajduković; Croatia	Kristýna Kaszperová; Czech Republic

=== Mixed Team ===
Event	Gold	Silver	Bronze
Mixed Team	Serbia; Veljko Varnicić; Aleksandra Andrić; Nemanja Simić; Mara Rasić; Nikola Radanov; Nina Andrić	Germany; Konstantin Distel; Elina Dilger; Samuel Bischoff; Emily Plich; Julius Glaser; Jolina Reinhold	France; Ahmed-Adam Hamdaoui; Emma Feuillet-Nguimgo; Azriel Dekenn Diffo; Céline Iddir; Titouan Lucas; Constance Dos Reis
Mixed Team	Serbia; Veljko Varnicić; Aleksandra Andrić; Nemanja Simić; Mara Rasić; Nikola Radanov; Nina Andrić	Germany; Konstantin Distel; Elina Dilger; Samuel Bischoff; Emily Plich; Julius Glaser; Jolina Reinhold	Ukraine; Mykhailo Solianyk; Kira Bahmet; Serhii Zhadan; Daria Karpus; Khazar Heydarov; Ilarii Tsurkan
