= 2021 European Cadet Judo Championships =

Judo 2021 European Cadet Judo Championships
- Venue: Arena Riga
- Location: Riga, Latvia
- Dates: 17–19 August 2021
- Competitors: 391 from 37 nations

Competition at external databases
- Links: IJF • JudoInside

The 2021 European Cadet Judo Championships was an edition of the European U18 Judo Championships, organised by the European Judo Union. It was held in the Arena Riga in Riga, Latvia from 17–19 August 2021.

== Event videos ==
The event will air freely on the EJU YouTube channel.

	Weight classes	Preliminaries			Final Block	
Day 1	Men: -50, -55, -60 Women: -40, -44, -48	Commentated			Commentated	
Day 1	Men: -50, -55, -60 Women: -40, -44, -48	Tatami 1	Tatami 2	Tatami 3	Tatami 1	Tatami 2
Day 2	Men: -66, -73 Women: -52, -57, -63	Commentated			Commentated	
Day 2	Men: -66, -73 Women: -52, -57, -63	Tatami 1	Tatami 2	Tatami 3	Tatami 1	Tatami 2
Day 3	Men: -81, -90, +90 Women: -70, +70	Commentated			Commentated	
Day 3	Men: -81, -90, +90 Women: -70, +70	Tatami 1	Tatami 2	Tatami 3	Tatami 1	Tatami 2

== Medal overview ==
=== Men ===
Event	Gold	Silver	Bronze
−50 kg	(Azerbaijan) Khayal Hasanov	(Russia) Daniil Mustafin	(Hungary) Sebestyén Kollár
−50 kg	(Azerbaijan) Khayal Hasanov	(Russia) Daniil Mustafin	(Azerbaijan) Babarahim Mirzayev
−55 kg	(Azerbaijan) Islam Rahimov	(Russia) Samvel Mkhitarian	(Ukraine) Nazar Viskov
−55 kg	(Azerbaijan) Islam Rahimov	(Russia) Samvel Mkhitarian	(Belarus) Kiryl Vitkouski
−60 kg	(Israel) Yehonatan Veksler	(Azerbaijan) Aydin Rzayev	(Israel) Robert Sorkin
−60 kg	(Israel) Yehonatan Veksler	(Azerbaijan) Aydin Rzayev	(Azerbaijan) Zahir Aghazada
−66 kg	(Russia) Timur Arbuzov	(Serbia) Strahinja Maleš	(Italy) Valerio Accogli
−66 kg	(Russia) Timur Arbuzov	(Serbia) Strahinja Maleš	(Armenia) Artak Torosyan
−73 kg	(Russia) Rolan Kunizhev	(Serbia) Dušan Grahovac	(Turkey) Erman Gürgen
−73 kg	(Russia) Rolan Kunizhev	(Serbia) Dušan Grahovac	(Poland) Dawid Szulik
−81 kg	(Georgia (country)) Aleksandre Loladze	(France) Jason Okoye	(Russia) Ilia Musatov
−81 kg	(Georgia (country)) Aleksandre Loladze	(France) Jason Okoye	(Serbia) Miljan Radulj
−90 kg	(Russia) Ruslan Somenko	(Italy) Francesco Basso	(Georgia (country)) Archil Mamulashvili
−90 kg	(Russia) Ruslan Somenko	(Italy) Francesco Basso	(Belgium) Ilman Nesirkoyev
+90 kg	(Russia) Denis Batchaev	(Russia) Vladislav Dorofeev	(Georgia (country)) Saba Kardava
+90 kg	(Russia) Denis Batchaev	(Russia) Vladislav Dorofeev	(Czech Republic) Tomáš Raška

=== Women ===
Event	Gold	Silver	Bronze
−40 kg	(Russia) Polina Iakovenko	(Turkey) Zilan Ertem	(Hungary) Szabina Szeleczki
−40 kg	(Russia) Polina Iakovenko	(Turkey) Zilan Ertem	(Ukraine) Marharyta Miroshnichenko
−44 kg	(France) Pauline Cuq	(Sweden) Tara Babulfath	(Turkey) Nurten Doğrusoy
−44 kg	(France) Pauline Cuq	(Sweden) Tara Babulfath	(Germany) Helen Habib
−48 kg	(Azerbaijan) Aydan Valiyeva	(Romania) Vanessa Tolea	(Poland) Wiktoria Ślązok
−48 kg	(Azerbaijan) Aydan Valiyeva	(Romania) Vanessa Tolea	(Turkey) Şeyma Yıldırım
−52 kg	(Switzerland) Binta Ndiaye	(Italy) Giulia Carnà	(Romania) Florina Bădiceanu
−52 kg	(Switzerland) Binta Ndiaye	(Italy) Giulia Carnà	(Italy) Michela Terranova
−57 kg	(Israel) Kerem Primo	(Russia) Olga Mukhina	(Poland) Daniela Badura
−57 kg	(Israel) Kerem Primo	(Russia) Olga Mukhina	(France) Maylis Rozan
−63 kg	(Germany) Nele Noack	(Luxembourg) Kenza Cossu	(Czech Republic) Anna Skalská
−63 kg	(Germany) Nele Noack	(Luxembourg) Kenza Cossu	(Austria) Lisa Tretnjak
−70 kg	(Ukraine) Yelyzaveta Lytvynenko	(Germany) Eva Ronja Buddenkotte	(Sweden) Ingrid Nilsson
−70 kg	(Ukraine) Yelyzaveta Lytvynenko	(Germany) Eva Ronja Buddenkotte	(Austria) Elena Dengg
+70 kg	(Belgium) Rachel Rammant	(Israel) Yuli Alma Mishiner	(Serbia) Jovana Stjepanović
+70 kg	(Belgium) Rachel Rammant	(Israel) Yuli Alma Mishiner	(Russia) Alexandra Riabchenko

=== Medal table ===
Rank	Nation	Gold	Silver	Bronze	Total
1	Russia (RUS)	5	4	2	11
2	Azerbaijan (AZE)	3	1	2	6
3	Israel (ISR)	2	1	1	4
4	France (FRA)	1	1	1	3
4	Germany (GER)	1	1	1	3
6	Georgia (GEO)	1	0	2	3
6	Ukraine (UKR)	1	0	2	3
8	Belgium (BEL)	1	0	1	2
9	Switzerland (SUI)	1	0	0	1
10	Italy (ITA)	0	2	2	4
10	Serbia (SRB)	0	2	2	4
12	Turkey (TUR)	0	1	3	4
13	Romania (ROU)	0	1	1	2
13	Sweden (SWE)	0	1	1	2
15	Luxembourg (LUX)	0	1	0	1
16	Poland (POL)	0	0	3	3
17	Austria (AUT)	0	0	2	2
17	Czech Republic (CZE)	0	0	2	2
17	Hungary (HUN)	0	0	2	2
20	Armenia (ARM)	0	0	1	1
20	Belarus (BLR)	0	0	1	1
Totals (21 entries)		16	16	32	64

Source: "Cadet European Championships (Individual) – Standings". International Judo Federation.
