= Judo at the 1991 European Youth Olympic Days =

Judo competition

- Host city: Brussels, Belgium
- Date(s): 1991
- Nations participating: 7
- Events: 15 (boys, 8; girls, 7)

Judo at the 1991 European Youth Olympic Days was held in Brussels, Belgium between 18 and 20 July 1991.

== Medal summary ==
=== Events ===
Games	Gold	Silver	Bronze
Boys events
-45 kg	Steffen Hohnsbein; Germany	D. Millington; Great Britain	M. Campioni; Italy; Cédric Taymans; Belgium
-50 kg	Ismo Mikkonen; Finland	Patrick Van Kalken; Netherlands	Vasile Curca; Romania
-50 kg	Ismo Mikkonen; Finland	Patrick Van Kalken; Netherlands	Cyril Gondolo; France
-55 kg	Yulduz Soultanov; Soviet Union	J. Saltner; Great Britain	Pasi Luukkainen; Finland
-55 kg	Yulduz Soultanov; Soviet Union	J. Saltner; Great Britain	Cosmin Bocsa; Romania
-60 kg	Bektas Demirel; Soviet Union	Thierry Peersmans; Belgium	Ludovic Delacotte; France
-60 kg	Bektas Demirel; Soviet Union	Thierry Peersmans; Belgium	David Somerville; Great Britain
-65 kg	Nicolae Savu; Romania	Mario Dell'Endice; Italy	Magomed Gabarov; Soviet Union
-65 kg	Nicolae Savu; Romania	Mario Dell'Endice; Italy	Christian Konz; Germany
-71 kg	Christophe Leprete; France	Lee Harron; Great Britain	Eduard Dzoutsev; Soviet Union
-71 kg	Christophe Leprete; France	Lee Harron; Great Britain	Jean-Paul Bingen; Netherlands
-78 kg	Dmitry Morozov; Soviet Union	Bert Terrijn; Belgium	Carlo Vistoso; Italy
-78 kg	Dmitry Morozov; Soviet Union	Bert Terrijn; Belgium	Alex Wintermans; Netherlands
+78 kg	Karim Boumedjane; France	Alexandru Lungu; Romania	Antonio Romero; Spain
+78 kg	Karim Boumedjane; France	Alexandru Lungu; Romania	Eric Kriege; Austria
Girls events
-44 kg	Moira Giusti; Italy	E. Callejo; Spain	Caroline Morisson; France
-44 kg	Moira Giusti; Italy	E. Callejo; Spain	E. Smith; Great Britain
-48 kg	Deborah Allen; Great Britain	Beata Kucharzewska; Poland	C. Dinu; Romania
-48 kg	Deborah Allen; Great Britain	Beata Kucharzewska; Poland	Inga Sokolovskaya; Soviet Union
-52 kg	Ewa-Larysa Krause; Poland	I. Andreana; Bulgaria	Carine Verdickt; Belgium
-52 kg	Ewa-Larysa Krause; Poland	I. Andreana; Bulgaria	Karen Roberts; Great Britain
-56 kg	Monique Janssen; Netherlands	M. Stiller; Germany	Nicole Hurst; Great Britain
-56 kg	Monique Janssen; Netherlands	M. Stiller; Germany	Vicky Bellon; Belgium
-61 kg	Sara Álvarez; Spain	Irena Tokarz; Poland	Andreia Cavalleri; Portugal
-61 kg	Sara Álvarez; Spain	Irena Tokarz; Poland	Nancy Snoeck; Belgium
-66 kg	Ylenia Scapin; Italy	Vasilica Bratu; Romania	Úrsula Martin; Germany
-66 kg	Ylenia Scapin; Italy	Vasilica Bratu; Romania	B.A. Wilkes; Great Britain
+66 kg	Olesya Kovalenko; Soviet Union	Esther San Miguel; Spain	Aurora Grigoras; Romania
+66 kg	Olesya Kovalenko; Soviet Union	Esther San Miguel; Spain	Stacey Smith (judoka); Great Britain
