= 2022 European Cadet Judo Championships =

Judo competition

Judo 2022 European Cadet Judo Championships
- Venue: Sport Hall Intersport
- Location: Poreč, Croatia
- Dates: 23–26 June 2022
- Competitors: 420 from 40 nations

Champions
- Mixed team: Ukraine (1st title)

Competition at external databases
- Links: IJF • JudoInside

The 2022 European Cadet Judo Championships was held at the Sport Hall Intersport in Poreč, Croatia, from 23 to 26 June 2022, with the mixed team competition taking place on the competition's last day.

== Event videos ==
The event will air freely on the EJU YouTube channel.

	Weight classes	Preliminaries			Final Block	
Day 1	Boys: -50, -55, -60 Girls: -40, -44, -48	Commentated			Commentated	
Day 1	Boys: -50, -55, -60 Girls: -40, -44, -48	Tatami 1	Tatami 2	Tatami 3	Tatami 2	Tatami 3
Day 2	Boys: -66, -73 Girls: -52, -57, -63	Commentated			Commentated	
Day 2	Boys: -66, -73 Girls: -52, -57, -63	Tatami 1	Tatami 2	Tatami 3	Tatami 2	Tatami 3
Day 3	Boys: -81, -90, +90 Girls: -70, +70	Commentated			Commentated	
Day 3	Boys: -81, -90, +90 Girls: -70, +70	Tatami 1	Tatami 2	Tatami 3	Tatami 2	Tatami 3
Day 4	Mixed Teams	Commentated			Commentated	
Day 4	Mixed Teams	Tatami 1	Tatami 2	Tatami 3	Tatami 2	Tatami 3

== Medal overview ==
=== Men ===
Event	Gold	Silver	Bronze
−50 kg	Yahn Motoly-Bongambé (FRA)	Kais Guettari (FRA)	Mahammad Mamishov (AZE)
−50 kg	Yahn Motoly-Bongambé (FRA)	Kais Guettari (FRA)	Sebestyén Kollár (HUN)
−55 kg	Shahin Orujzade (AZE)	Matija Jeremić (SRB)	Daviti Lomitashvili (GEO)
−55 kg	Shahin Orujzade (AZE)	Matija Jeremić (SRB)	Vahe Aghasyan (ARM)
−60 kg	Nizami Imranov (AZE)	Ádám Major (HUN)	Kelvin Ray (FRA)
−60 kg	Nizami Imranov (AZE)	Ádám Major (HUN)	Nazar Viskov (UKR)
−66 kg	Saba Samadashvili (GEO)	Kylian Noël (FRA)	Abil Yusubov (AZE)
−66 kg	Saba Samadashvili (GEO)	Kylian Noël (FRA)	Nijat Naghiyev (AZE)
−73 kg	Giorgi Mishvelidze (GEO)	Mihajlo Simin (SRB)	Ali Hajizada (AZE)
−73 kg	Giorgi Mishvelidze (GEO)	Mihajlo Simin (SRB)	Erman Gürgen (TUR)
−81 kg	Igor Tsurkan (UKR)	Gor Karapetyan (ARM)	Ronald Pröll (AUT)
−81 kg	Igor Tsurkan (UKR)	Gor Karapetyan (ARM)	Dušan Grahovac (SRB)
−90 kg	Milan Bulaja (SRB)	Péter Kenderesi (HUN)	Maksims Bižāns (LAT)
−90 kg	Milan Bulaja (SRB)	Péter Kenderesi (HUN)	Oleksii Boldyriev (UKR)
+90 kg	Christian Khokhlov (UKR)	Davit Kevlishvili (ESP)	Bogdan Petre (ROU)
+90 kg	Christian Khokhlov (UKR)	Davit Kevlishvili (ESP)	İbrahim Tataroğlu (TUR)

=== Women ===
Event	Gold	Silver	Bronze
−40 kg	Zilan Ertem (TUR)	Patrícia Tománková (SVK)	Natalija Prolić (SRB)
−40 kg	Zilan Ertem (TUR)	Patrícia Tománková (SVK)	Nina Auer (AUT)
−44 kg	Vera Wandel (NED)	Morgane Annis (FRA)	Markéta Korčáková (CZE)
−44 kg	Vera Wandel (NED)	Morgane Annis (FRA)	Szabina Szeleczki (HUN)
−48 kg	Tara Babulfath (SWE)	Aydan Valiyeva (AZE)	Tabea Mecklenburg (GER)
−48 kg	Tara Babulfath (SWE)	Aydan Valiyeva (AZE)	Alyssia Poulange (FRA)
−52 kg	Laura Igaz (HUN)	Luciana Catană (ROU)	Anna Tieliegina (UKR)
−52 kg	Laura Igaz (HUN)	Luciana Catană (ROU)	Charlotte Jenman (GBR)
−57 kg	Fidan Alizada (AZE)	Inez Bognár (HUN)	Gaia Stella (ITA)
−57 kg	Fidan Alizada (AZE)	Inez Bognár (HUN)	Anna Gulīte (LAT)
−63 kg	Sinem Oruç (TUR)	Doria Boursas (FRA)	Leila Mazouzi (SLO)
−63 kg	Sinem Oruç (TUR)	Doria Boursas (FRA)	Anna Oliinyk-Korniiko (UKR)
−70 kg	Lila Mazzarino (FRA)	Ecem Baysuğ (TUR)	Jael Wernert (AUT)
−70 kg	Lila Mazzarino (FRA)	Ecem Baysuğ (TUR)	Serena Ondei (ITA)
+70 kg	Grace-Esther Mienandi Lahou (FRA)	Yuli Alma Mishiner (ISR)	Célia Cancan (FRA)
+70 kg	Grace-Esther Mienandi Lahou (FRA)	Yuli Alma Mishiner (ISR)	Diana Semchenko (UKR)

=== Mixed ===
Event	Gold	Silver	Bronze
Mixed team	Ukraine	France	Azerbaijan
Mixed team	Ukraine	France	Georgia

=== Medal table ===
Rank	Nation	Gold	Silver	Bronze	Total
1	France (FRA)	3	5	3	11
2	Azerbaijan (AZE)	3	1	5	9
3	Ukraine (UKR)	3	0	5	8
4	Turkey (TUR)	2	1	2	5
5	Georgia (GEO)	2	0	2	4
6	Hungary (HUN)	1	3	2	6
7	Serbia (SRB)	1	2	2	5
8	Netherlands (NED)	1	0	0	1
8	Sweden (SWE)	1	0	0	1
10	Armenia (ARM)	0	1	1	2
10	Romania (ROU)	0	1	1	2
12	Israel (ISR)	0	1	0	1
12	Slovakia (SVK)	0	1	0	1
12	Spain (ESP)	0	1	0	1
15	Austria (AUT)	0	0	3	3
16	Italy (ITA)	0	0	2	2
16	Latvia (LAT)	0	0	2	2
18	Czech Republic (CZE)	0	0	1	1
18	Germany (GER)	0	0	1	1
18	Great Britain (GBR)	0	0	1	1
18	Slovenia (SLO)	0	0	1	1
Totals (21 entries)		17	17	34	68
