= Judo at the 2023 European Youth Summer Olympic Festival =

Judo Judo at the 2023 European Youth Summer Olympic Festival
- Venue: Lukna Hall
- Location: Maribor, Slovenia
- Dates: 25–29 July
- Competitors: 308 from 43 nations

Champions
- Mixed team: Turkey (2nd title)

Competition at external databases
- Links: IJF • JudoInside

The Judo event at the 2023 European Youth Summer Olympic Festival was held at the Lukna Hall arena in Maribor, Slovenia, from 25 to 29 July 2023. An NOC could have been represented by up to 12 athletes, given that no more than 1 of them participates in any weight class. The final day of competition featured a mixed team event, won by team Turkey.

== Schedule & event videos ==
All times are local (UTC+2).

	Date	Weight classes	Preliminaries	Final Block
Day 1	25 July	Boys: −55, −60 Girls: −44, −48	13:00	17:00
Day 2	26 July	Boys: −66, −73 Girls: −52, −57	10:00	17:00
Day 3	27 July	Boys: −81, −90 Girls: −63, −70	10:00	17:00
Day 4	28 July	Boys: −100, +100 Girls: −78, +78	11:00	17:00
Day 5	29 July	Mixed team	9:30	16:00

=== Medal table ===
* Host nation (Slovenia)

Rank	Nation	Gold	Silver	Bronze	Total
1	Azerbaijan (AZE)	3	3	4	10
2	Georgia (GEO)	3	2	2	7
3	Turkey (TUR)	3	2	1	6
4	Romania (ROU)	2	0	0	2
5	Spain (ESP)	1	2	1	4
6	Austria (AUT)	1	1	1	3
7	Croatia (CRO)	1	1	0	2
8	Slovakia (SVK)	1	0	2	3
9	Slovenia (SLO)*	1	0	1	2
10	Great Britain (GBR)	1	0	0	1
11	Ukraine (UKR)	0	1	2	3
12	Belgium (BEL)	0	1	1	2
12	Germany (GER)	0	1	1	2
12	Italy (ITA)	0	1	1	2
15	Estonia (EST)	0	1	0	1
15	Lithuania (LTU)	0	1	0	1
17	Hungary (HUN)	0	0	3	3
17	Serbia (SRB)	0	0	3	3
19	Netherlands (NED)	0	0	2	2
19	Portugal (POR)	0	0	2	2
21	Czech Republic (CZE)	0	0	1	1
21	Finland (FIN)	0	0	1	1
21	France (FRA)	0	0	1	1
21	Moldova (MDA)	0	0	1	1
21	Montenegro (MNE)	0	0	1	1
21	Sweden (SWE)	0	0	1	1
21	Switzerland (SUI)	0	0	1	1
Totals (27 entries)		17	17	34	68

== Medal summary ==
=== Boys ===
Event	Gold	Silver	Bronze
−50 kg	Shota Bachoshvili; Georgia	Askhab Isayev; Belgium	Bence Galó; Hungary
−50 kg	Shota Bachoshvili; Georgia	Askhab Isayev; Belgium	Nihad Mamishov; Azerbaijan
−55 kg	Merabi Samadashvili; Georgia	Emiliano Lattanzi; Italy	Marko Jorgić; Serbia
−55 kg	Merabi Samadashvili; Georgia	Emiliano Lattanzi; Italy	Aykhan Mirzazada; Azerbaijan
−60 kg	Tudor-Ilie Mosoi; Romania	Simas Polikevičius; Lithuania	Sebestyén Kollár; Hungary
−60 kg	Tudor-Ilie Mosoi; Romania	Simas Polikevičius; Lithuania	Mahammad Musayev; Azerbaijan
−66 kg	Mate Gvelesiani; Georgia	Luka Katić; Croatia	Rodrigo Janeiro; Portugal
−66 kg	Mate Gvelesiani; Georgia	Luka Katić; Croatia	Jasur Ibadli; Azerbaijan
−73 kg	David Gliga; Romania	Suleyman Shukurov; Azerbaijan	Yunus Yazgan; Turkey
−73 kg	David Gliga; Romania	Suleyman Shukurov; Azerbaijan	Bogdan Veličković; Serbia
−81 kg	Emir Selim Arı; Turkey	Giorgi Bendeliani; Georgia	Dušan Grahovac; Serbia
−81 kg	Emir Selim Arı; Turkey	Giorgi Bendeliani; Georgia	Andrei Peaticovschi; Moldova
−90 kg	Aslan Kotsoev; Azerbaijan	Saba Gvelesiani; Georgia	Emil Jabiyev; Sweden
−90 kg	Aslan Kotsoev; Azerbaijan	Saba Gvelesiani; Georgia	Antonio Aixel Ramirez Perez; Spain
+90 kg	İbrahim Tataroğlu; Turkey	Ramazan Ahmadov; Azerbaijan	Shotiko Gochiashvili; Georgia
+90 kg	İbrahim Tataroğlu; Turkey	Ramazan Ahmadov; Azerbaijan	Stefan Kovinić; Montenegro

=== Girls ===
Event	Gold	Silver	Bronze
−40 kg	Patrícia Tománková; Slovakia	Nina Auer; Austria	Imane Lima; France
−40 kg	Patrícia Tománková; Slovakia	Nina Auer; Austria	Mélody Veillard; Switzerland
−44 kg	Marta Beorlegui Oses; Spain	Begümnaz Doğruyol; Turkey	Kristína Lili Križová; Slovakia
−44 kg	Marta Beorlegui Oses; Spain	Begümnaz Doğruyol; Turkey	Lena Antoine; Belgium
−48 kg	Vusala Hajiyeva; Azerbaijan	Aitana Diaz Hernandez; Spain	Elena Storione; Italy
−48 kg	Vusala Hajiyeva; Azerbaijan	Aitana Diaz Hernandez; Spain	Noor Noufal; Netherlands
−52 kg	Khadizha Gadashova; Azerbaijan	Adriana Saez Hevia; Spain	Tabea Mecklenburg; Germany
−52 kg	Khadizha Gadashova; Azerbaijan	Adriana Saez Hevia; Spain	Luca Vég; Hungary
−57 kg	Nika Tomc; Slovenia	Odalis Santiago-Santana; Germany	Riina Myllyla; Finland
−57 kg	Nika Tomc; Slovenia	Odalis Santiago-Santana; Germany	Maria Silveira; Portugal
−63 kg	Jana Cvjetko; Croatia	Sinem Oruç; Turkey	Kristina Opanasenko; Ukraine
−63 kg	Jana Cvjetko; Croatia	Sinem Oruç; Turkey	Leila Mazouzi; Slovenia
−70 kg	Julia Marczak; Great Britain	Anna Oliinyk-Korniiko; Ukraine	Xanne van Lijf; Netherlands
−70 kg	Julia Marczak; Great Britain	Anna Oliinyk-Korniiko; Ukraine	Jael Wernert; Austria
+70 kg	Helene Schrattenholzer; Austria	Emma-Melis Aktas; Estonia	Nina Filkorová; Slovakia
+70 kg	Helene Schrattenholzer; Austria	Emma-Melis Aktas; Estonia	Marie Žofie Košnarová; Czech Republic

Source results:

=== Mixed Team ===
Event	Gold	Silver	Bronze
Mixed Team	Turkey (TUR): Hilal Akyıldız; Emir Selim Arı; Gizem Dinçer; Begümnaz Doğruyol; Fatih Dursun; Tuana Gülenay; Sema Mete; Hilmi Mucık; Sinem Oruç; İbrahim Tataroğlu; Yunus Yazgan	Azerbaijan (AZE): Maryam Bayramzade; Ramazan Ahmadov; Hüseyn Eyvazlı; Khadizha Gadashova; Vusala Hajiyeva; Aslan Kotsoev; Aykhan Mirzazada; Mahammad Musayev; Suleyman Shukurov; Kamilla Toholiyeva	Ukraine (UKR): Daria Dolia; Artur Amirian; Danylo Kravchenko; Marharyta Miroshnichenko; Taras Nielziev; Anna Oliinyk-Korniiko; Yaroslav Omelchenko; Kristina Opanasenko
Mixed Team	Turkey (TUR): Hilal Akyıldız; Emir Selim Arı; Gizem Dinçer; Begümnaz Doğruyol; Fatih Dursun; Tuana Gülenay; Sema Mete; Hilmi Mucık; Sinem Oruç; İbrahim Tataroğlu; Yunus Yazgan	Azerbaijan (AZE): Maryam Bayramzade; Ramazan Ahmadov; Hüseyn Eyvazlı; Khadizha Gadashova; Vusala Hajiyeva; Aslan Kotsoev; Aykhan Mirzazada; Mahammad Musayev; Suleyman Shukurov; Kamilla Toholiyeva	Georgia (GEO): Nona Doliashvili; Giorgi Bendeliani; Tornike Gigauri; Tamar Gigolaevi; Shotiko Gochiashvili; Saba Gvelesiani; Irakli Kavtarashvili; Lizi Kvartskhava; Nino Papidze; Merabi Samadashvili

Source results:

== Participating nations ==
A total of 308 athletes from 43 nations competed in judo at the 2023 European Youth Summer Olympic Festival:

- Albania (2)
- Armenia (7)
- Austria (9)
- Azerbaijan (12)
- Belgium (7)
- Bosnia and Herzegovina (2)
- Bulgaria (6)
- Croatia (8)
- Cyprus (4)
- Czech Republic (9)
- Denmark (3)
- Estonia (7)
- Finland (5)
- France (12)
- Georgia (12)
- Germany (12)
- Great Britain (9)
- Greece (6)
- Hungary (12)
- Iceland (2)
- Israel (12)
- Italy (12)
- Kosovo (6)
- Latvia (6)
- Liechtenstein (1)
- Lithuania (7)
- Luxembourg (2)
- Moldova (9)
- Montenegro (2)
- Netherlands (10)
- North Macedonia (1)
- Norway (3)
- Poland (12)
- Portugal (8)
- Romania (12)
- Serbia (7)
- Slovakia (7)
- Slovenia (12)
- Spain (6)
- Sweden (4)
- Switzerland (3)
- Turkey (12)
- Ukraine (9)
