= 2005 European Junior Judo Championships =

Judo competition

Judo 2005 European Junior Judo Championships
- Location: Zagreb, Croatia
- Dates: 30 September – 2 October 2005

Competition at external databases
- Links: JudoInside

The 2005 European Junior Judo Championships is an edition of the European Junior Judo Championships, organised by the International Judo Federation. It was held in Zagreb, Croatia from 30 September to 2 October 2005.

== Medal summary ==
=== Medal table ===
* Host nation (Croatia)

Rank	Nation	Gold	Silver	Bronze	Total
1	Germany (GER)	4	0	4	8
2	Israel (ISR)	2	0	1	3
3	Azerbaijan (AZE)	2	0	0	2
4	Moldova (MDA)	1	1	0	2
5	Belarus (BLR)	1	0	1	2
5	Ukraine (UKR)	1	0	1	2
7	Lithuania (LTU)	1	0	0	1
7	Portugal (POR)	1	0	0	1
7	Turkey (TUR)	1	0	0	1
10	Russia (RUS)	0	3	4	7
11	Hungary (HUN)	0	3	1	4
12	Netherlands (NED)	0	2	3	5
13	Czech Republic (CZE)	0	1	1	2
14	Bulgaria (BUL)	0	1	0	1
14	Great Britain (GBR)	0	1	0	1
14	Italy (ITA)	0	1	0	1
14	Slovenia (SLO)	0	1	0	1
18	France (FRA)	0	0	5	5
19	Georgia (GEO)	0	0	3	3
20	Belgium (BEL)	0	0	1	1
20	Greece (GRE)	0	0	1	1
20	Latvia (LAT)	0	0	1	1
20	Poland (POL)	0	0	1	1
Totals (23 entries)		14	14	28	56

=== Men's events ===
Event	Gold	Silver	Bronze
Extra-lightweight (−60 kg)	Nijat Shikhalizada (AZE)	Rok Drakšič (SLO)	Philipp Dahn (GER)
Extra-lightweight (−60 kg)	Nijat Shikhalizada (AZE)	Rok Drakšič (SLO)	Shamil Nash (RUS)
Half-lightweight (−66 kg)	Sergiu Toma (MDA)	Jasper de Jong (NED)	Giorgi Shoshiashvili (GEO)
Half-lightweight (−66 kg)	Sergiu Toma (MDA)	Jasper de Jong (NED)	Tariel Zintiridis (GRE)
Lightweight (−73 kg)	Araz Mukhtarov (AZE)	Valeriu Duminică (MDA)	Aliaksandr Stsiashenka (BLR)
Lightweight (−73 kg)	Araz Mukhtarov (AZE)	Valeriu Duminică (MDA)	Jaromír Ježek (CZE)
Half-middleweight (−81 kg)	Andrei Kiptsevich (BLR)	Kirill Voprosov (RUS)	Kacper Larem (POL)
Half-middleweight (−81 kg)	Andrei Kiptsevich (BLR)	Kirill Voprosov (RUS)	David Karbelashvili (GEO)
Middleweight (−90 kg)	Alon Sasson (ISR)	Bálint István Farkas (HUN)	Jevgeņijs Borodavko (LAT)
Middleweight (−90 kg)	Alon Sasson (ISR)	Bálint István Farkas (HUN)	Robert Zimmermann (GER)
Half-heavyweight (−100 kg)	Egidijus Žilinskas (LTU)	Aleksander Moiseev (RUS)	Cyrille Maret (FRA)
Half-heavyweight (−100 kg)	Egidijus Žilinskas (LTU)	Aleksander Moiseev (RUS)	Tino Bierau (GER)
Heavyweight (+100 kg)	Fabian Hubert (GER)	Soslan Dzhanaev (RUS)	Teddy Riner (FRA)
Heavyweight (+100 kg)	Fabian Hubert (GER)	Soslan Dzhanaev (RUS)	Adam Okruashvili (GEO)

=== Women's events ===
Event	Gold	Silver	Bronze
Extra-lightweight (−48 kg)	Tatyana Simantov (ISR)	Éva Csernoviczki (HUN)	Nataliya Kondratyeva (RUS)
Extra-lightweight (−48 kg)	Tatyana Simantov (ISR)	Éva Csernoviczki (HUN)	Wasilisa Prill (GER)
Half-lightweight (−52 kg)	Melanie Lierka (GER)	Lucie Chytrá (CZE)	Hedvig Karakas (HUN)
Half-lightweight (−52 kg)	Melanie Lierka (GER)	Lucie Chytrá (CZE)	Kitty Bravik (NED)
Lightweight (−57 kg)	Olha Starubinska (UKR)	Bernadett Baczkó (HUN)	Marta Labazina (RUS)
Lightweight (−57 kg)	Olha Starubinska (UKR)	Bernadett Baczkó (HUN)	Michelle Diemeer (NED)
Half-middleweight (−63 kg)	Ana Cachola (POR)	Anicka van Emden (NED)	Alice Schlesinger (ISR)
Half-middleweight (−63 kg)	Ana Cachola (POR)	Anicka van Emden (NED)	Irina Zabludina (RUS)
Middleweight (−70 kg)	Kerstin Thiele (GER)	Jennifer Pitzanti (ITA)	Anais Llopis (FRA)
Middleweight (−70 kg)	Kerstin Thiele (GER)	Jennifer Pitzanti (ITA)	Nataliya Malikova (UKR)
Half-heavyweight (−78 kg)	Franziska Konitz (GER)	Mariya Oryashkova (BUL)	Rachel Schoonderbeek (NED)
Half-heavyweight (−78 kg)	Franziska Konitz (GER)	Mariya Oryashkova (BUL)	Géraldine Mentouopou (FRA)
Heavyweight (+78 kg)	Gülşah Kocatürk (TUR)	Sarah Adlington (GBR)	Laurie Luisi (BEL)
Heavyweight (+78 kg)	Gülşah Kocatürk (TUR)	Sarah Adlington (GBR)	Marjorie Deroose (FRA)

Source Results
