= 2002 European Cadet Judo Championships =

Judo competition

Judo 2002 European Cadet Judo Championships
- Location: Győr, Hungary
- Dates: 29–30 June 2002

Competition at external databases
- Links: JudoInside

The 2002 European Cadet Judo Championships is an edition of the European Cadet Judo Championships, organised by the International Judo Federation. It was held in Győr, Hungary from 29 to 30 June 2002.

== Medal summary ==
=== Medal table ===
* Host nation (Hungary)

Rank	Nation	Gold	Silver	Bronze	Total
1	Russia (RUS)	6	1	4	11
2	Great Britain (GBR)	2	1	1	4
3	Hungary (HUN)*	2	0	2	4
4	Germany (GER)	1	3	2	6
5	Netherlands (NED)	1	2	2	5
6	Azerbaijan (AZE)	1	1	1	3
7	Israel (ISR)	1	0	1	2
8	Georgia (GEO)	1	0	0	1
8	Greece (GRE)	1	0	0	1
10	France (FRA)	0	2	2	4
11	Yugoslavia (YUG)	0	1	1	2
12	Austria (AUT)	0	1	0	1
12	Belarus (BLR)	0	1	0	1
12	Bulgaria (BUL)	0	1	0	1
12	Poland (POL)	0	1	0	1
12	Spain (ESP)	0	1	0	1
17	Slovenia (SLO)	0	0	3	3
17	Ukraine (UKR)	0	0	3	3
19	Latvia (LAT)	0	0	2	2
19	Lithuania (LTU)	0	0	2	2
19	Moldova (MDA)	0	0	2	2
19	Romania (ROU)	0	0	2	2
23	Bosnia and Herzegovina (BIH)	0	0	1	1
23	Czech Republic (CZE)	0	0	1	1
Totals (24 entries)		16	16	32	64

=== Men's events ===
Event	Gold	Silver	Bronze
−50 kg	Shikham Nash (RUS)	Hermann Hoellwart (AUT)	Dimitris Kozlovs (LAT)
−50 kg	Shikham Nash (RUS)	Hermann Hoellwart (AUT)	Dumitru Schvartz (ROU)
−55 kg	Ibragim Muzhukhoev (RUS)	Khayal Gahramanov (AZE)	Valeriu Duminică (MDA)
−55 kg	Ibragim Muzhukhoev (RUS)	Khayal Gahramanov (AZE)	Rok Drakšič (SLO)
−60 kg	Rza Aliyev (AZE)	Othman El Kostiti (FRA)	Andrejs Magers (LAT)
−60 kg	Rza Aliyev (AZE)	Othman El Kostiti (FRA)	Anton Popov (MDA)
−66 kg	Zalimkhan Rasulov (RUS)	Julian Kerr (GBR)	Radovan Maly (CZE)
−66 kg	Zalimkhan Rasulov (RUS)	Julian Kerr (GBR)	Jérôme Guyot (FRA)
−73 kg	Ilias Iliadis (GRE)	Andrei Kiptsevich (BLR)	Farid Allakhverdiyev (AZE)
−73 kg	Ilias Iliadis (GRE)	Andrei Kiptsevich (BLR)	Valentin Josserand (FRA)
−81 kg	Saba Gavashelishvili (GEO)	Soslan Tmenov (RUS)	Alon Sasson (ISR)
−81 kg	Saba Gavashelishvili (GEO)	Soslan Tmenov (RUS)	Vyacheslav Denysov (UKR)
−90 kg	Vitaly Lapkovsky (RUS)	Leroy Klozen (NED)	Amir Topuz (BIH)
−90 kg	Vitaly Lapkovsky (RUS)	Leroy Klozen (NED)	Tomas Vaicekonis (LTU)
+90 kg	Barna Bor (HUN)	Bojan Stanisic (YUG)	Tomas Meckovskis (LTU)
+90 kg	Barna Bor (HUN)	Bojan Stanisic (YUG)	Mikhail Borodushkin (RUS)

=== Women's events ===
Event	Gold	Silver	Bronze
−40 kg	Nataliya Kondratyeva (RUS)	Rebecca King (GER)	Charlotte Farbon (GBR)
−40 kg	Nataliya Kondratyeva (RUS)	Rebecca King (GER)	Olha Sukha (UKR)
−44 kg	Tatyana Simantov (ISR)	Frizzi Poers (GER)	Kitty Bravik (NED)
−44 kg	Tatyana Simantov (ISR)	Frizzi Poers (GER)	Tatyana A. Ivanova (RUS)
−48 kg	Nicole Walters (GBR)	Viola Wächter (GER)	Éva Csernoviczki (HUN)
−48 kg	Nicole Walters (GBR)	Viola Wächter (GER)	Anna Mazunina (RUS)
−52 kg	Anna Khramtsova (RUS)	Snezhina Vasileva (BUL)	Olha Starubinska (UKR)
−52 kg	Anna Khramtsova (RUS)	Snezhina Vasileva (BUL)	Franziska Pufahl (GER)
−57 kg	Bernadett Baczkó (HUN)	Anicka van Emden (NED)	Corina Căprioriu (ROU)
−57 kg	Bernadett Baczkó (HUN)	Anicka van Emden (NED)	Maja Ursic (SLO)
−63 kg	Esther Stam (NED)	Emmanuelle Payet (FRA)	Anett Mészáros (HUN)
−63 kg	Esther Stam (NED)	Emmanuelle Payet (FRA)	Yulia Bobyleva (RUS)
−70 kg	Franziska Konitz (GER)	Izabela Szewieczek (POL)	Rosemarijn Jansen (NED)
−70 kg	Franziska Konitz (GER)	Izabela Szewieczek (POL)	Tamara Sesevic (YUG)
+70 kg	Abbie Cunningham (GBR)	Marta Tort (ESP)	Katja Kressmann (GER)
+70 kg	Abbie Cunningham (GBR)	Marta Tort (ESP)	Tina Kukec (SLO)

Source Results
