= 2022 World Judo Cadets Championships =

Judo competition

Judo 2022 World Judo Cadets Championships
- Venue: Arena Hotel Hills
- Location: Sarajevo, Bosnia and Herzegovina
- Dates: 24–28 August 2022
- Competitors: 483 from 60 nations
- Total prize money: 100,000€

Champions
- Mixed team: France (1st title)

Competition at external databases
- Links: IJF • JudoInside

The 2022 World Judo Cadets Championships was held at the Arena Hotel Hills in Sarajevo, Bosnia and Herzegovina, from 24 to 28 August 2022, with the mixed teams event taking place on the competition's last day.

== Schedule ==
All times are local (UTC+2).

| | Date | Weight classes | | Preliminaries | Final Block |
| | Date | Men | Women | Preliminaries | Final Block |
|---|---|---|---|---|---|
| Day 1 | 24 August | –50, –55 | –40, –44 | 17:00 | 12:00 |
| Day 2 | 25 August | –60, –66 | –48, –52 | 17:00 | 9:00 |
| Day 3 | 26 August | –73, –81 | –57, –63 | 17:00 | 10:00 |
| Day 4 | 27 August | –90, +90 | –70, +70 | 17:00 | 11:00 |
| Day 5 | 28 August | Mixed teams | | 17:00 | 10:00 |

== Medal summary ==
India won its first ever gold medal at a Judo World Championships.

=== Medal table ===
* Host nation (Bosnia and Herzegovina)

| Rank | Nation | Gold | Silver | Bronze | Total |
|---|---|---|---|---|---|
| 1 | France (FRA) | 4 | 2 | 1 | 7 |
| 2 | Georgia (GEO) | 2 | 1 | 3 | 6 |
| 3 | Japan (JPN) | 2 | 0 | 2 | 4 |
| 4 | Uzbekistan (UZB) | 1 | 4 | 4 | 9 |
| 5 | Turkey (TUR) | 1 | 2 | 2 | 5 |
| 6 | Italy (ITA) | 1 | 1 | 3 | 5 |
| 7 | Hungary (HUN) | 1 | 1 | 0 | 2 |
| 8 | Ukraine (UKR) | 1 | 0 | 3 | 4 |
| 9 | Armenia (ARM) | 1 | 0 | 0 | 1 |
| 9 | Canada (CAN) | 1 | 0 | 0 | 1 |
| 9 | India (IND) | 1 | 0 | 0 | 1 |
| 9 | Netherlands (NED) | 1 | 0 | 0 | 1 |
| 13 | Azerbaijan (AZE) | 0 | 2 | 2 | 4 |
| 14 | Brazil (BRA) | 0 | 2 | 0 | 2 |
| 15 | Sweden (SWE) | 0 | 1 | 1 | 2 |
| 16 | Austria (AUT) | 0 | 1 | 0 | 1 |
| 17 | Kazakhstan (KAZ) | 0 | 0 | 2 | 2 |
| 17 | Mongolia (MGL) | 0 | 0 | 2 | 2 |
| 17 | Serbia (SRB) | 0 | 0 | 2 | 2 |
| 17 | Slovakia (SVK) | 0 | 0 | 2 | 2 |
| 21 | Chinese Taipei (TPE) | 0 | 0 | 1 | 1 |
| 21 | Greece (GRE) | 0 | 0 | 1 | 1 |
| 21 | Latvia (LAT) | 0 | 0 | 1 | 1 |
| 21 | Romania (ROU) | 0 | 0 | 1 | 1 |
| 21 | United States (USA) | 0 | 0 | 1 | 1 |
| Totals (25 entries) | | 17 | 17 | 34 | 68 |

=== Men's events ===
| Event | Gold | Silver | Bronze |
|---|---|---|---|
| −50 kg | Yahn Motoly-Bongambé (FRA) | Sebestyén Kollár (HUN) | Dias Zholdybayev (KAZ) |
| −50 kg | Yahn Motoly-Bongambé (FRA) | Sebestyén Kollár (HUN) | David Leiva (USA) |
| −55 kg | Zacharie Dijol (FRA) | Shahin Orujzade (AZE) | Daviti Lomitashvili (GEO) |
| −55 kg | Zacharie Dijol (FRA) | Shahin Orujzade (AZE) | Saba Sabashvili (GEO) |
| −60 kg | Davit Kareli (GEO) | Kelvin Ray (FRA) | Nizami Imranov (AZE) |
| −60 kg | Davit Kareli (GEO) | Kelvin Ray (FRA) | Talgat Orynbassar (KAZ) |
| −66 kg | Saba Samadashvili (GEO) | Shohjakhon Otaboev (UZB) | Dimitrios Giannopoulos (GRE) |
| −66 kg | Saba Samadashvili (GEO) | Shohjakhon Otaboev (UZB) | Federico Bosis (ITA) |
| −73 kg | Keito Kihara (JPN) | Luka Javakhishvili (GEO) | Giorgi Mishvelidze (GEO) |
| −73 kg | Keito Kihara (JPN) | Luka Javakhishvili (GEO) | Samariddin Muxibiddinov (UZB) |
| −81 kg | Gor Karapetyan (ARM) | Alisher Samanov (UZB) | Igor Tsurkan (UKR) |
| −81 kg | Gor Karapetyan (ARM) | Alisher Samanov (UZB) | Dušan Grahovac (SRB) |
| −90 kg | Peter Kenderesi (HUN) | Abbos Shermakhmatov (UZB) | Oleksii Boldyriev (UKR) |
| −90 kg | Peter Kenderesi (HUN) | Abbos Shermakhmatov (UZB) | Milan Bulaja (SRB) |
| +90 kg | John Jr. Messé A Bessong (CAN) | Gabriel Santos (BRA) | Dota Arai (JPN) |
| +90 kg | John Jr. Messé A Bessong (CAN) | Gabriel Santos (BRA) | Bogdan Petre (ROU) |

=== Women's events ===
| Event | Gold | Silver | Bronze |
|---|---|---|---|
| −40 kg | Anastasiia Superson (UKR) | Begümnaz Doğruyol (TUR) | Patrícia Tománková (SVK) |
| −40 kg | Anastasiia Superson (UKR) | Begümnaz Doğruyol (TUR) | Zilan Ertem (TUR) |
| −44 kg | Vera Wandel (NED) | Zeynep Betül Sarıkaya (TUR) | Umidakhon Burkhonjonova (UZB) |
| −44 kg | Vera Wandel (NED) | Zeynep Betül Sarıkaya (TUR) | Rebecca Valeriani (ITA) |
| −48 kg | Kano Miyaki (JPN) | Tara Babulfath (SWE) | Aydan Valiyeva (AZE) |
| −48 kg | Kano Miyaki (JPN) | Tara Babulfath (SWE) | Myagmarsürengiin Nandin-Erdene (MGL) |
| −52 kg | Gaia Massimetti (ITA) | Sugdiyona Rafkatova (UZB) | Anna Tieliegina (UKR) |
| −52 kg | Gaia Massimetti (ITA) | Sugdiyona Rafkatova (UZB) | Shen Yi-hsi (TPE) |
| −57 kg | Linthoi Chanambam (IND) | Bianca Reis (BRA) | Anna Gulīte (LAT) |
| −57 kg | Linthoi Chanambam (IND) | Bianca Reis (BRA) | Savita Russo (ITA) |
| −63 kg | Sinem Oruç (TUR) | Franziska Schlögl (AUT) | Khurshida Razzokberdieva (UZB) |
| −63 kg | Sinem Oruç (TUR) | Franziska Schlögl (AUT) | Lenka Tománková (SVK) |
| −70 kg | Barchinoy Kodirova (UZB) | Serena Ondei (ITA) | Ingrid Nilsson (SWE) |
| −70 kg | Barchinoy Kodirova (UZB) | Serena Ondei (ITA) | Lila Mazzarino (FRA) |
| +70 kg | Grace-Esther Mienandi Lahou (FRA) | Célia Cancan (FRA) | Batsuuriin Nyam-Erdene (MGL) |
| +70 kg | Grace-Esther Mienandi Lahou (FRA) | Célia Cancan (FRA) | Mika Nakano (JPN) |

=== Mixed ===
| Event | Gold | Silver | Bronze |
|---|---|---|---|
| Mixed team | France | Azerbaijan | Turkey |
| Mixed team | France | Azerbaijan | Uzbekistan |

== Prize money ==
The sums written are per medalist, bringing the total prizes awarded to €80,000 for the individual contests and €20,000 for the team competition. (retrieved from:)

| Medal | Individual | | | Mixed team | | |
| Medal | Total | Judoka | Coach | Total | Judoka | Coach |
| Gold | €2,300 | €1,840 | €460 | €8,000 | €6,400 | €1,600 |
| Silver | €1,300 | €1,040 | €260 | €5,600 | €4,480 | €1,120 |
| Bronze | €700 | €560 | €140 | €3,200 | €2,560 | €640 |
