= Judo at the 2022 European Youth Summer Olympic Festival =

Judo Judo at the 2022 European Youth Summer Olympic Festival
- Venue: Sports Park Judo
- Location: Banská Bystrica, Slovakia
- Dates: 26–30 July
- Competitors: 297 from 43 nations

Competition at external databases
- Links: IJF • JudoInside

The Judo event at the 2022 European Youth Summer Olympic Festival was held at the Sports Park Judo arena in Banská Bystrica, Slovakia, from 26 to 30 July 2022. An NOC may be represented by up to 12 athletes, given that no more than 1 of them participates in any weight class. The final day of competition featured a mixed team event.

== Schedule & event videos ==
The event aired on the EJU YouTube channel. All times are local (UTC+2).

	Date	Weight classes	Preliminaries			Final Block		
	Date	Weight classes	Start time	videos		Start time	videos	
Day 1	2 July	Boys: −55, −60 Girls: −44, −48	11:00	Commentated		16:00	Commentated	
Day 1	2 July	Boys: −55, −60 Girls: −44, −48	11:00	Tatami 1	Tatami 2	16:00	Tatami 1	Tatami 2
Day 2	27 July	Boys: −66, −73 Girls: −52, −57	10:00	Commentated		16:00	Commentated	
Day 2	27 July	Boys: −66, −73 Girls: −52, −57	10:00	Tatami 1	Tatami 2	16:00	Tatami 1	Tatami 2
Day 3	28 July	Boys: −81, −90 Girls: −63, −70	10:00	Commentated		16:00	Commentated	
Day 3	28 July	Boys: −81, −90 Girls: −63, −70	10:00	Tatami 1	Tatami 2	16:00	Tatami 1	Tatami 2
Day 4	29 July	Boys: −100, +100 Girls: −78, +78	11:00	Commentated		16:00	Commentated	
Day 4	29 July	Boys: −100, +100 Girls: −78, +78	11:00	Tatami 1	Tatami 2	16:00	Tatami 1	Tatami 2
Day 5	30 July	Mixed team	10:00	Commentated		16:00	Commentated	
Day 5	30 July	Mixed team	10:00	Tatami 1	Tatami 2	16:00	Tatami 1	Tatami 2

== Medal summary ==
=== Boys ===
Event	Gold	Silver	Bronze
−55 kg	Daviti Lomitashvili (GEO)	Murad Aliyev (AZE)	Vahe Aghasyan (ARM)
−55 kg	Daviti Lomitashvili (GEO)	Murad Aliyev (AZE)	Roy Rubinstein (ISR)
−60 kg	Jochem van Harten (NED)	Nurlan Karimli (AZE)	Davit Kareli (GEO)
−60 kg	Jochem van Harten (NED)	Nurlan Karimli (AZE)	Nazar Viskov (UKR)
−66 kg	İbrahim Demirel (TUR)	Tobias Fürst Črtanec (SLO)	Tornike Mosiashvili (GEO)
−66 kg	İbrahim Demirel (TUR)	Tobias Fürst Črtanec (SLO)	Robert Sorkin (ISR)
−73 kg	Joshua de Lange (NED)	Mihajlo Simin (SRB)	Artak Torosyan (ARM)
−73 kg	Joshua de Lange (NED)	Mihajlo Simin (SRB)	Ivan Kazimirov (UKR)
−81 kg	Stanislav Korchemliuk (UKR)	Ismayil Zamanov (AZE)	Matīss Zeiļa (LAT)
−81 kg	Stanislav Korchemliuk (UKR)	Ismayil Zamanov (AZE)	Gor Karapetyan (ARM)
−90 kg	Miljan Radulj (SRB)	Nik Purnat (SLO)	Rareș Arsenie (ROU)
−90 kg	Miljan Radulj (SRB)	Nik Purnat (SLO)	Archil Mamulashvili (GEO)
−100 kg	Petre Bogdan (ROU)	Francesco Basso (ITA)	Joës Schell (NED)
−100 kg	Petre Bogdan (ROU)	Francesco Basso (ITA)	Geori Baduashvili (GEO)
+100 kg	Giori Tabatadze (GEO)	Recep Ergin (TUR)	Giannis Antoniou (CYP)
+100 kg	Giori Tabatadze (GEO)	Recep Ergin (TUR)	Kanan Nasibov (AZE)

=== Girls ===
Event	Gold	Silver	Bronze
−44 kg	Vera Wandel (NED)	Szabina Szeleczki (HUN)	Clara Mermet (FRA)
−44 kg	Vera Wandel (NED)	Szabina Szeleczki (HUN)	Tanzila Muntsurova (AUT)
−48 kg	Ilaria Finestrone (ITA)	Konul Aliyeva (AZE)	Helen Habib (GER)
−48 kg	Ilaria Finestrone (ITA)	Konul Aliyeva (AZE)	Summer Shaw (GBR)
−52 kg	Laura Gómez Antona (ESP)	Nikolina Nišavić (SRB)	Luca Mamira (HUN)
−52 kg	Laura Gómez Antona (ESP)	Nikolina Nišavić (SRB)	Aydan Valiyeva (AZE)
−57 kg	Fidan Alizada (AZE)	Julie Beurskens (NED)	Julia Bulanda (POL)
−57 kg	Fidan Alizada (AZE)	Julie Beurskens (NED)	Emma Melis (FRA)
−63 kg	Kerem Primo (ISR)	Adél Kelemen (HUN)	Sara Corbo (ITA)
−63 kg	Kerem Primo (ISR)	Adél Kelemen (HUN)	Nele Noack (GER)
−70 kg	Ingrid Nilsson (SWE)	Elena Dengg (AUT)	Nika Koren (SLO)
−70 kg	Ingrid Nilsson (SWE)	Elena Dengg (AUT)	Nino Gulbani (GEO)
−78 kg	Yelyzaveta Lytvynenko (UKR)	Yuli Alma Mishiner (ISR)	Mathilda Sophie Niemeyer (GER)
−78 kg	Yelyzaveta Lytvynenko (UKR)	Yuli Alma Mishiner (ISR)	Fábia Conceição (POR)
+78 kg	Diana Semchenko (UKR)	Bintibe Lang (FRA)	Morgana De Paoli (ITA)

Source Results

=== Mixed Team ===
Event	Gold	Silver	Bronze
Mixed Team	Azerbaijan (AZE): Khumar Gasimzade; Konul Aliyeva; Aydan Valiyeva; Fidan Alizada; Nigar Suleymanova; Murad Aliyev; Nurlan Karimli; Eltaj Yusifli; Gadir Huseynov; Ismayil Zamanov; Azhdar Baghirov; Kanan Nasibov	Ukraine (UKR): Nazar Viskov; Ivan Kazimirov; Stanislav Korchemliuk; Oleksii Boldyriev; Fedir Yaroshenko; Tetiana Limzaieva; Yuliia Kuzmenko; Alisa Videneieva; Yelyzaveta Lytvynenko; Diana Semchenko	Israel (ISR): Sofiia Kuchkova; Noa Bruzhanitsky; Kerem Primo; Gaya Bar Or; Yuli Alma Mishiner; Oren Aharon; Robert Sorkin; Yaniv Agronov; Inbar Gabay
Mixed Team	Azerbaijan (AZE): Khumar Gasimzade; Konul Aliyeva; Aydan Valiyeva; Fidan Alizada; Nigar Suleymanova; Murad Aliyev; Nurlan Karimli; Eltaj Yusifli; Gadir Huseynov; Ismayil Zamanov; Azhdar Baghirov; Kanan Nasibov	Ukraine (UKR): Nazar Viskov; Ivan Kazimirov; Stanislav Korchemliuk; Oleksii Boldyriev; Fedir Yaroshenko; Tetiana Limzaieva; Yuliia Kuzmenko; Alisa Videneieva; Yelyzaveta Lytvynenko; Diana Semchenko	Georgia (GEO): Julieta Rodonaia; Mariami Potskhverashvili; Nino Loladze; Nino Gulbani; Daviti Lomitashvili; Davit Kareli; Tornike Mosiashvili; Sandro Akhlouri; Aleksandre Loladze; Archil Mamulashvili

Source Results

=== Medal table ===
Rank	Nation	Gold	Silver	Bronze	Total
1	Ukraine (UKR)	3	1	2	6
2	Netherlands (NED)	3	1	1	5
3	Azerbaijan (AZE)	2	4	2	8
4	Georgia (GEO)	2	0	6	8
5	Serbia (SRB)	1	2	0	3
6	Israel (ISR)	1	1	3	5
7	Italy (ITA)	1	1	2	4
8	Turkey (TUR)	1	1	0	2
9	Romania (ROU)	1	0	1	2
10	Spain (ESP)	1	0	0	1
10	Sweden (SWE)	1	0	0	1
12	Hungary (HUN)	0	2	1	3
12	Slovenia (SLO)	0	2	1	3
14	France (FRA)	0	1	2	3
15	Austria (AUT)	0	1	1	2
16	Armenia (ARM)	0	0	3	3
16	Germany (GER)	0	0	3	3
18	Cyprus (CYP)	0	0	1	1
18	Great Britain (GBR)	0	0	1	1
18	Latvia (LAT)	0	0	1	1
18	Poland (POL)	0	0	1	1
18	Portugal (POR)	0	0	1	1
Totals (22 entries)		17	17	33	67
