= Croatia at the 2023 European Youth Summer Olympic Festival =

in (Slovenia) Maribor 23 July 2023 – 29 July 2023
- Competitors: 74 in 8 sports
- Medals Ranked 15th: Gold 3 Silver 2 Bronze 0 Total 5

European Youth Summer Olympic Festival appearances
- 1993 • 1995 • 1997 • 1999 • 2001 • 2003 • 2005 • 2007 • 2009 • 2011 • 2013 • 2015 • 2017 • 2019 • 2022 • 2023

Croatia competed at the 2023 European Youth Summer Olympic Festival from 23 to 29 July 2023 in Maribor, Slovenia with 74 participants in 8 sports.

== Flagbearers ==
Croatian flagbearers at the opening ceremony were judoka Jana Cvjetko and athlete Janko Kišak. At the closing ceremony, flagbearers were athlete Mia Wild and judoka Luka Katić.

== Medals ==
Croatia won 5 medals: 3 gold and 2 silver ones.

Medal winners were:

- Gold Vita Barbić (athletics, javelin throw)
- Gold Jana Cvjetko (judo, 66 kg)
- Gold Mia Wild (athletics, 100m hurdles)
- Silver Luka Katić (judo, 66 kg)
- Silver Janko Kišak (athletics, 110m hurdles)
