= Judo at the European Youth Summer Olympic Festival =

Judo competition

Competition details
- Discipline: Judo
- Type: Biannual
- Organiser: European Judo Union (EJU)

History
- First edition: Brussels 1991
- Editions: 18
- Most recent: Skopje 2025
- Next edition: Lignano Sabbiadoro 2027

The judo event at the European Youth Olympic Festival is a biannual judo competition organized by the European Judo Union for European judoka aged 18 and younger.

The most recent contest took place in Skopje, North Macedonia. The next will take place in Lignano Sabbiadoro, Italy.

== Competitions ==
Edition	Year	Dates	City and host country	Venue	# Countries	# Athletes	Ref.
1	1991	8 June	Brussels, Belgium				
2	1993	5–8 July	Valkenswaard, Netherlands				
3	1995	10–13 July	(United Kingdom) Bath, Great Britain				
4	1997	20–23 July	Lisbon, Portugal				
5	1999	11–15 July	Esbjerg, Denmark				
6	2001	22–27 July	Murcia, Spain				
7	2003	28–31 July	Paris, France				
8	2005	4–7 July	Lignano, Italy				
9	2007	24–27 July	Belgrade, Serbia				
10	2009	21–24 July	Tampere, Finland				
11	2011	26–29 July	Trabzon, Turkey				
12	2013	13–20 July	Utrecht, Netherlands				
13	2015	28 July – 1 August	(Georgia (country)) Tbilisi, Georgia				
14	2017	25–28 July	Győr, Hungary		326	47	
15	2019	24–27 July	Baku, Azerbaijan		297	40	
16	2022	26–30 July	Banská Bystrica, Slovakia		297	43	
17	2023	25–29 July	Maribor, Slovenia	Lukna Hall	308	43	
18	2025	22–26 July	Skopje, North Macedonia	Jane Sandanski Arena			

== See also ==
- European Junior Judo Championships
- European Cadet Judo Championships
