= 2005 European Team Judo Championships =

2005 Judo European Team Judo Championships
- Location: Debrecen, Hungary
- Date: 22–23 October 2005
- Nations: 5
- Teams: 8

Champions
- Men's team: Israel (1st title)
- Women's team: France (15th title)

Competition at external databases
- Links: JudoInside

The 2005 European Team Judo Championships were held in Debrecen, Hungary on 22–23 October. The men's competition won by Israel, and the women's by France.

== Results ==
=== Men ===
Semi-finals
Israel	4
France	2
Hungary	4
Russia	2

Final
Israel	4
Hungary	3
Third place
Russia	4
France	3

=== Women ===
Semi-finals
France	5
Hungary	1
Russia	4
United Kingdom	2

Final
France	6
Russia	1
Third place
Hungary	4
United Kingdom	3
