= National team appearances in the European Wheelchair Handball Nations' Tournament =

This article lists the performances of each of the 5 national teams which have made at least one appearance in the European Wheelchair Handball Nations' Tournament finals.

== Debut of teams ==
Each successive European Men's Handball Championship has had at least one team appearing for the first time. Teams in parentheses are considered successor teams by IHF.

Year	Debutants	Number of Debutants
2015	Netherlands; Norway; Portugal; Sweden	4
2016	Italy	1
2018	Croatia; Hungary	2
2019	Romania; Slovenia	2
2025	Lithuania; France; Spain	3

== Participation details ==
Legend

- 1st – Champions
- 2nd – Runners-up
- 3rd – Third place
- 4th – Fourth place
- • – Did not enter
- – Hosts

For each tournament, the number of teams in each finals tournament (in brackets) are shown.

Team	2015 (4)	2016 (4)	2018 (4)	2019 (6)	2025 (9)	Participations
Croatia	•	•	2nd	1st	4th	3
Hungary	•	•	4th	3rd	8th	3
Italy	•	4th	•	•	•	1
Netherlands	1st	1st	3rd	4th	9th	5
Norway	3rd	•	•	•	6th	2
Portugal	2nd	2nd	1st	2nd	1st	5
Romania	•	•	•	5th	7th	2
Slovenia	•	•	•	6th	•	1
Sweden	4th	3rd	•	•	•	2
Lithuania	•	•	•	•	3rd	1
France	•	•	•	•	2nd	1
Spain	•	•	•	•	5th	1

== Results of host nations ==
Year	Host nation	Finish
2015	Austria	Did not enter
2016	Sweden	3rd place
2018	Portugal	Champions
2019	Croatia	Champions
2025	Lithuania	3rd place

== Results of defending champions ==
Year	Defending champions	Finish	Defending runners-ups	Finish
2016	Netherlands	Champions	Portugal	Runners-up
2018	Netherlands	3rd place	Portugal	Champions
2019	Portugal	Runners-up	Croatia	Champions
2025	Croatia	4th place	Portugal	Champions
