= Euro Hand 4 All =

- Current season, competition or edition: 2023 Euro Hand 4 All
- Sport: Wheelchair handball
- First season: 2022

The Euro Hand 4 All is a tournament for senior national Wheelchair handball teams of the world. The first two edition were played in Écully (Lyon Metropolis), France.

== Tournaments ==
Year	Host	Final			3rd place match			Teams
Year	Host	Champions	Score	Runners-up	3rd place	Score	4th place	Teams
2022; Details	(France); Écully	Portugal	26–14	France	Spain	21–8	Belgium	4
2023; Details	(France); Écully	Portugal	21–20	Spain	France	17–14	Croatia	6
2024; Details	(France); Écully	Spain	22–21	Portugal	France	14–6	Netherlands	6
2025; Details	(France); Écully	Portugal	9–8/5-9/6-4	France	United States	2-6/5-4/5-4	Spain	6
2026; Details	(France); Écully	United States	9–7/9-8	Spain	Portugal	9-8/6-5	France	8

== Medal count ==
Rank	Nation	Gold	Silver	Bronze	Total
1	Portugal	3	1	1	5
2	Spain	1	2	1	4
3	United States	1	0	1	2
4	France	0	2	2	4
Totals (4 entries)		5	5	5	15

== Participation details ==
Legend

- 1st – Champions
- 2nd – Runners-up
- 3rd – Third place
- 4th – Fourth place
- • – Did not enter
- – Hosts

For each tournament, the number of teams in each finals tournament (in brackets) are shown.

Team	2022 (4)	2023 (6)	2024 (6)	2025 (6)	Participations
Belgium	4th	6th	•	•	2
Croatia	•	4th	•	•	1
France	2nd	3rd	3rd	2nd	4
Hungary	•	•	6th	5th	2
Netherlands	•	•	4th	6th	2
Norway	•	5th	5th	•	2
Portugal	1st	1st	2nd	1st	4
Spain	3rd	2nd	1st	4th	4
United States	•	•	•	3rd	1

== Website ==
- Official website

== See also ==
- Wheelchair handball
- European Wheelchair Handball Nations' Tournament
- IHF Wheelchair Handball World Championship
- Pan American Wheelchair Handball Championship
