= 2023 Euro Hand 4 All =

Tournament details
- Host country: France
- Venue(s): 1 (in 1 host city)
- Dates: 23 – 24 June 2023
- Teams: 6 (from 1 confederation)

Final positions
- Champions: Portugal (2nd title)
- Runner-up: Spain
- Third place: France
- Fourth place: Croatia

Tournament statistics
- Matches played: 8
- Goals scored: 395 (49.38 per match)
- Top scorer(s): (Portugal) Ricardo Queiros

Awards
- Best player: (Spain) Oscar Perales (M) (Portugal) Tina Relvas (W)

The 2023 Euro Hand 4 All was the second edition of the wheelchair handball tournament which was held in Centre Sportif et de Loisirs d'Écully in the Écully (Lyon Metropolis), France from 23 to 24 June 2023.

== Preliminary round ==
All times are local (UTC+2).

=== Group A ===
Pos	Team	Pld	W	D	L	GF	GA	GD	Pts	Qualification
1	France (H)	2	2	0	0	39	17	+22	4	Semifinals
2	Croatia	2	1	0	1	40	27	+13	2	Quarterfinals
3	Belgium	2	0	0	2	8	43	−35	0	Quarterfinals

Source: Euro Hand 4 All
Rules for classification: 1) points; 2) head-to-head points; 3) head-to-head goal difference; 4) head-to-head number of goals scored; 5) goal difference.
(H) Hosts

23 June 2023; 9:00	France	19–1	Belgium	Centre Sportif et de Loisirs d'Écully, Écully

23 June 2023; 11:40	France	20–16	Croatia	Centre Sportif et de Loisirs d'Écully, Écully

23 June 2023; 14:20	Belgium	7–24	Croatia	Centre Sportif et de Loisirs d'Écully, Écully

=== Group B ===
Pos	Team	Pld	W	D	L	GF	GA	GD	Pts	Qualification
1	Portugal	2	2	0	0	35	23	+12	4	Semifinals
2	Spain	2	1	0	1	30	29	+1	2	Quarterfinals
3	Norway	2	0	0	2	19	32	−13	0	Quarterfinals

Source: Euro Hand 4 All
Rules for classification: 1) points; 2) head-to-head points; 3) head-to-head goal difference; 4) head-to-head number of goals scored; 5) goal difference.

23 June 2023; 10:20	Spain	13–20	Portugal	Centre Sportif et de Loisirs d'Écully, Écully
23 June 2023; 10:20		(6–10)		Centre Sportif et de Loisirs d'Écully, Écully

23 June 2023; 13:00	Spain	17–9	Norway	Centre Sportif et de Loisirs d'Écully, Écully

23 June 2023; 15:40	Portugal	15–10	Norway	Centre Sportif et de Loisirs d'Écully, Écully
23 June 2023; 15:40		(8–6)		Centre Sportif et de Loisirs d'Écully, Écully

== Knockout stage ==
=== Bracket ===
Quarter-finals
23 August
B2 Spain	19
A3 Belgium	4
23 August
A2 Croatia	20
B3 Norway	17

Semi-finals
24 August
A1 France	18
B2 Spain	20
24 August
B1 Portugal	19
A2 Croatia	8

Final
24 August
B2 Spain	20
B1 Portugal	21
Third place
24 August
A1 France	17
A2 Croatia	14

=== Quarterfinals ===
23 June 2023; 17:30	Croatia	20–17	Norway	Centre Sportif et de Loisirs d'Écully, Écully

23 June 2023; 18:50	Spain	19–4	Belgium	Centre Sportif et de Loisirs d'Écully, Écully

=== Semifinals ===
24 June 2023; 19:00	France	18–20	Spain	Centre Sportif et de Loisirs d'Écully, Écully

24 June 2023; 10:30	Portugal	19–8	Croatia	Centre Sportif et de Loisirs d'Écully, Écully
24 June 2023; 10:30		(9–3)		Centre Sportif et de Loisirs d'Écully, Écully

=== Fifth place game ===
24 June 2023; 13:30	Norway	20–7	Belgium	Centre Sportif et de Loisirs d'Écully, Écully

=== Third place game ===
24 June 2023; 15:00	France	17–14	Croatia	Centre Sportif et de Loisirs d'Écully, Écully

=== Final ===
24 June 2023; 16:30	Spain	20–21	Portugal	Centre Sportif et de Loisirs d'Écully, Écully
24 June 2023; 16:30		(8–10)		Centre Sportif et de Loisirs d'Écully, Écully

== Final ranking ==
Rank	Team
1st place, gold medalist(s)	Portugal
2nd place, silver medalist(s)	Spain
3rd place, bronze medalist(s)	France
4	Croatia
5	Norway
6	Belgium

== Awards ==
Award	Player
Most Valuable Player Male	Oscar Perales (ESP)
Most Valuable Player Female	Tina Relvas (PRT)
Best Goalkeeper	Frederic Pasquier (FRA)
Topscorer	Ricardo Queiros (PRT)

== Website ==
- Official website
- Results
