= Italy national wheelchair handball team =

Italy

Information
- Association: Italian Handball Association

Colours
1st	2nd

Results

European Wheelchair Handball Nations’ Tournament
- Appearances: 1 (First in 2016)
- Best result: 4th (2016)
- Last updated on 2018-08-15.

The Italian national wheelchair handball team is the national wheelchair handball team of Italy and is controlled by the Italian Handball Association.

== Competitive record ==
=== European Wheelchair Handball Nations’ Tournament ===
European Wheelchair Handball Nations’ Tournamentrecord
Year	Round	Position	GP	W	D	L	GS	GA	GD
2015 Austria	Did not enter								
2016 Sweden	Fourth place	4th of 4	4	1	0	3	29	82	-53
2018 Portugal	Did not enter								
2019 Croatia	Did not enter								
