= 2022 Euro Hand 4 All =

Tournament details
- Host country: France
- Venue(s): 1 (in 1 host city)
- Dates: 1 – 2 July 2022
- Teams: 4 (from 1 confederation)

Final positions
- Champions: Portugal (1st title)
- Runner-up: France
- Third place: Spain
- Fourth place: Belgium

Tournament statistics
- Matches played: 8
- Goals scored: 239 (29.88 per match)

The 2022 Euro Hand 4 All was the first edition of the wheelchair handball tournament which was held in Centre Sportif et de Loisirs d'Écully in the Écully (Lyon Metropolis), France from 1 to 2 July 2022.

== Standings ==
Pos	Team	Pld	W	D	L	GF	GA	GD	Pts	Qualification
1	Portugal	3	3	0	0	60	32	+28	6	Final
2	France (H)	3	2	0	1	48	37	+11	4	Final
3	Spain	3	1	0	2	40	46	−6	2	Third place game
4	Belgium	3	0	0	3	22	55	−33	0	Third place game

Source: FFHB
Rules for classification: 1) points; 2) head-to-head points; 3) head-to-head goal difference; 4) head-to-head number of goals scored; 5) goal difference.
(H) Hosts

1 July 2022; 9:30	Belgium	3–17	France	Centre Sportif et de Loisirs d'Écully, Écully

1 July 2022; 10:30	Spain	10–18	Portugal	Centre Sportif et de Loisirs d'Écully, Écully

1 July 2022; 12:00	Portugal	23–8	Belgium	Centre Sportif et de Loisirs d'Écully, Écully

1 July 2022; 14:00	France	17–15	Spain	Centre Sportif et de Loisirs d'Écully, Écully

1 July 2022; 15:30	Belgium	11–15	Spain	Centre Sportif et de Loisirs d'Écully, Écully

1 July 2022; 16:45	France	14–19	Portugal	Centre Sportif et de Loisirs d'Écully, Écully

== Knockout stage ==
=== Third place game ===
2 July 2022; 14:30	Spain	21–8	Belgium	Centre Sportif et de Loisirs d'Écully, Écully
2 July 2022; 14:30		(12–6)		Centre Sportif et de Loisirs d'Écully, Écully

=== Final ===
2 July 2022; 16:45	Portugal	26–14	France	Centre Sportif et de Loisirs d'Écully, Écully

== Final ranking ==
Rank	Team
1st place, gold medalist(s)	Portugal
2nd place, silver medalist(s)	France
3rd place, bronze medalist(s)	Spain
4	Belgium

== Website ==
- Official website
- Site de FFHB
