= Japan national wheelchair handball team =

Japan

Information
- Association: Japan Wheelchair Handball Federation

Colours
1st	2nd
- Last updated on 2024-06-09.

The Japan national wheelchair handball team is the national wheelchair handball team of Japan and is overseen by the Japan Wheelchair Handball Federation.

== History ==
Japan planned to participate at the first Four a Side World Championship in September 2022. But because three women were needed for the competition and Japan didn't receive a single application from a woman they cancelled the plans in 2022. In 2024 they plan to participate at the second Four a Side World Championship.

== Competitive record ==
=== Wheelchair Handball World Championship ===
IHF Wheelchair Handball World Championship record (Four a Side)
Year	Position	GP	W	L	SW	SL	SPW	SPL
2022 Egypt	Did not participated							
2024 Egypt	5th							
Total	1/2	0	0	0	0	0	0	0

IHF Wheelchair Handball World Championship record (Six a Side)
Year	Position	GP	W	D	L	GF	GA
2022 Portugal	Did not participated						
Total	0/1	0	0	0	0	0	0
