= Troféu Internacional Vida =

- Sport: Wheelchair handball
- First season: 2022
- Most recent champion: Portugal
- Most titles: Portugal (2 titles)

The Troféu Internacional Vida (International Life Trophy) is a tournament between the national Wheelchair handball teams of Portugal and Spain. Both edition were simultaneously as the International Tournament of Viseu. Both edition won Portugal.

== 2022 ==
| 21 August 2022; 14:00 | Portugal | 20–13 | Spain | Pavilhão Cidade de Viseu, Viseu; Referees: Carvalho & Almeida (PRT) |
| 21 August 2022; 14:00 | Queiros 6 | (7–6) | Perales 10 | Pavilhão Cidade de Viseu, Viseu; Referees: Carvalho & Almeida (PRT) |
| 21 August 2022; 14:00 | 1× (yellow card) 1× (suspension) | Report | 3× (suspension) | Pavilhão Cidade de Viseu, Viseu; Referees: Carvalho & Almeida (PRT) |

== 2023 ==
| 19 August 2023; 14:00 | Portugal | 23–14 | Spain | Pavilhão Cidade de Viseu, Viseu; Referees: Santos & Carvalho (PRT) |
| 19 August 2023; 14:00 | Gomes 10 | (11–7) | González & Peraleseach 4 | Pavilhão Cidade de Viseu, Viseu; Referees: Santos & Carvalho (PRT) |
| 19 August 2023; 14:00 | 3× (suspension) | Report | 2× (suspension) | Pavilhão Cidade de Viseu, Viseu; Referees: Santos & Carvalho (PRT) |

| 20 August 2023; 14:00 | Portugal | 17–13 | Spain | Pavilhão Cidade de Viseu, Viseu; Referees: ? & Almeida (PRT) |
| 20 August 2023; 14:00 | Jerónimo 8 | (10–6) | Edjang 4 | Pavilhão Cidade de Viseu, Viseu; Referees: ? & Almeida (PRT) |
| 20 August 2023; 14:00 | 3× (suspension) | Report | 1× (yellow card) 5× (suspension) | Pavilhão Cidade de Viseu, Viseu; Referees: ? & Almeida (PRT) |
