= 2024 Wheelchair Handball World Championship =

Tournament details
- Host country: Egypt
- Venue(s): 2 (in 1 host city)
- Dates: 17 – 21 September 2024
- Teams: 8 (from 5 confederations)

Final positions
- Champions: Egypt (1st title)
- Runners-up: United States
- Third place: Brazil
- Fourth place: France

The 2024 Wheelchair Handball World Championship is a 4×4-wheelchair handball tournament held in Cairo, Egypt from 17 to 21 September 2024. The games were played at the Hassan Moustafa Sports Hall.

== Teams ==
Continent	Vacancies	Qualified
Africa / Host	1	Egypt
Asia	2	India; Japan
Europe	2	France; Portugal
North America and Caribbean (Wild card)	1	United States
South and Central America	2	Brazil; Chile

== Draw ==
The draw took place on 18 July 2024 at the IHF Head Office in Basel.

=== Seeding ===
The final attendees of the last World Championship were placed in Pot 1. Because no teams of the same continent are allowed to face in the group phase. The two Asian teams were placed in Pot 2 and the two European teams in Pot 3. The remaining teams South America 2 and the Wild card were placed in Pot 4.

Pot 1	Pot 2	Pot 3	Pot 4
Winner 2022 (South America 1); Runner-up 2022 (Africa 1)	Asia 1 Asia 2	Europe 1 Europe 2	South America 2 Wild card (North America 1)

First Pot 2 and 3 were drawn. Egypt from Pot 1 as host had the right to choose the group. Chile from Pot 4 was placed in the other group as Brazil.

Pot 1	Pot 2	Pot 3	Pot 4
Brazil (Hold); Egypt (Host)	India; Japan	France; Portugal	Chile; United States

== Group stage ==
=== Group A ===
Pos	Team	Pld	W	L	Pts	SW	SL	SR	SPW	SPL	SPR	Qualification
1	Brazil	3	3	0	6	6	0	MAX	46	18	2.556	Quarter finals
2	United States	3	2	1	4	4	3	1.333	40	48	0.833	Quarter finals
3	Japan	3	1	2	3	3	4	0.750	56	52	1.077	Quarter finals
4	France	3	0	3	0	0	6	0.000	30	54	0.556	Quarter finals

Source: IHF
Rules for classification: 1) Points; 2) Head-to-head points; 3) Head-to-head set difference; 4) Head-to-head points won; 5) Set difference; 6) Points won; 7) Draw.

17 September 2024; 13:00	Brazil	2–0	United States	Hassan Moustafa Sports Hall 1, Cairo; Attendance: 50; Referees: Fernandez (ESP), Carvalho (POR)
17 September 2024; 13:00	Lourenço 6	(9–2, 7–0)	Wolf 2	Hassan Moustafa Sports Hall 1, Cairo; Attendance: 50; Referees: Fernandez (ESP), Carvalho (POR)
17 September 2024; 13:00	1× (suspension)	Report	1× (suspension)	Hassan Moustafa Sports Hall 1, Cairo; Attendance: 50; Referees: Fernandez (ESP), Carvalho (POR)

17 September 2024; 15:00	Japan	2–0	France	Hassan Moustafa Sports Hall 1, Cairo; Attendance: 100; Referees: Santos (POR), Campo Barbero (ESP)
17 September 2024; 15:00	Moriya 15	(14–5, 12–7)	Cuhadar 6	Hassan Moustafa Sports Hall 1, Cairo; Attendance: 100; Referees: Santos (POR), Campo Barbero (ESP)
17 September 2024; 15:00	1× (suspension)	Report	1× (suspension)	Hassan Moustafa Sports Hall 1, Cairo; Attendance: 100; Referees: Santos (POR), Campo Barbero (ESP)

18 September 2024; 10:30	United States	2–1	Japan	Hassan Moustafa Sports Hall 1, Cairo; Attendance: 200; Referees: Magalhaes Da Silva (BRA), Fernandez (ESP)
18 September 2024; 10:30	Wolf 13	(5–9, 9–3, 10–8)	Morooka 11	Hassan Moustafa Sports Hall 1, Cairo; Attendance: 200; Referees: Magalhaes Da Silva (BRA), Fernandez (ESP)
18 September 2024; 10:30	2× (suspension)	Report	1× (yellow card) 2× (suspension)	Hassan Moustafa Sports Hall 1, Cairo; Attendance: 200; Referees: Magalhaes Da Silva (BRA), Fernandez (ESP)

18 September 2024; 12:30	France	0–2	Brazil	Hassan Moustafa Sports Hall 2, Cairo; Attendance: 80; Referees: Campo Barbero (ESP), Carvalho (POR)
18 September 2024; 12:30	Cuhadar 4	(3–5, 3–9)	Lourenço 5	Hassan Moustafa Sports Hall 2, Cairo; Attendance: 80; Referees: Campo Barbero (ESP), Carvalho (POR)
18 September 2024; 12:30	1× (suspension)	Report	1× (suspension)	Hassan Moustafa Sports Hall 2, Cairo; Attendance: 80; Referees: Campo Barbero (ESP), Carvalho (POR)

18 September 2024; 17:00	France	0–2	United States	Hassan Moustafa Sports Hall 2, Cairo; Referees: Magalhaes Da Silva (BRA), Diep (ARG)
18 September 2024; 17:00	Cuhadar 6	(5–7, 5–7)	Townsend 6	Hassan Moustafa Sports Hall 2, Cairo; Referees: Magalhaes Da Silva (BRA), Diep (ARG)
18 September 2024; 17:00	1× (suspension)	Report	3× (suspension)	Hassan Moustafa Sports Hall 2, Cairo; Referees: Magalhaes Da Silva (BRA), Diep (ARG)

18 September 2024; 19:00	Brazil	2–0	Japan	Hassan Moustafa Sports Hall 2, Cairo; Referees: Santor (POR), Bubalo (AUT)
18 September 2024; 19:00	Lourenço 5	(7–5, 9–5)	Morooka 8	Hassan Moustafa Sports Hall 2, Cairo; Referees: Santor (POR), Bubalo (AUT)
18 September 2024; 19:00	2× (suspension)	Report	1× (suspension)	Hassan Moustafa Sports Hall 2, Cairo; Referees: Santor (POR), Bubalo (AUT)

=== Group B ===
Pos	Team	Pld	W	L	Pts	SW	SL	SR	SPW	SPL	SPR	Qualification
1	Portugal	3	3	0	6	6	1	6.000	50	37	1.351	Quarter finals
2	Egypt (H)	3	2	1	5	5	2	2.500	47	37	1.270	Quarter finals
3	Chile	3	1	2	2	2	5	0.400	39	45	0.867	Quarter finals
4	India	3	0	3	1	1	6	0.167	27	44	0.614	Quarter finals

Source: IHF
Rules for classification: 1) Points; 2) Head-to-head points; 3) Head-to-head set difference; 4) Head-to-head points won; 5) Set difference; 6) Points won; 7) Draw.
(H) Host

17 September 2024; 17:00	Egypt	2–0	Chile	Hassan Moustafa Sports Hall 1, Cairo; Attendance: 200; Referees: Bubalo (AUT), Magalhaes Da Silva (BRA)
17 September 2024; 17:00	Talaat Abdo Abbas 12	(9–8, 8–7)	Carrasco 4	Hassan Moustafa Sports Hall 1, Cairo; Attendance: 200; Referees: Bubalo (AUT), Magalhaes Da Silva (BRA)
17 September 2024; 17:00	1× (yellow card) 3× (suspension)	Report	2× (suspension)	Hassan Moustafa Sports Hall 1, Cairo; Attendance: 200; Referees: Bubalo (AUT), Magalhaes Da Silva (BRA)

17 September 2024; 19:00	India	0–2	Portugal	Hassan Moustafa Sports Hall 1, Cairo; Attendance: 100; Referees: Fernandez (ESP), Diep (ARG)
17 September 2024; 19:00	Ramavath 8	(5–8, 6–8)	Queirós 9	Hassan Moustafa Sports Hall 1, Cairo; Attendance: 100; Referees: Fernandez (ESP), Diep (ARG)
17 September 2024; 19:00	2× (suspension)	Report		Hassan Moustafa Sports Hall 1, Cairo; Attendance: 100; Referees: Fernandez (ESP), Diep (ARG)

18 September 2024; 10:30	Chile	2–1	India	Hassan Moustafa Sports Hall 2, Cairo; Attendance: 50; Referees: Bubalo (AUT), Santos (POR)
18 September 2024; 10:30	Hernández 5	(5–6, 5–4, 2–1)	Choudhari 6	Hassan Moustafa Sports Hall 2, Cairo; Attendance: 50; Referees: Bubalo (AUT), Santos (POR)
18 September 2024; 10:30		Report	2× (suspension)	Hassan Moustafa Sports Hall 2, Cairo; Attendance: 50; Referees: Bubalo (AUT), Santos (POR)

18 September 2024; 12:30	Portugal	2–1	Egypt	Hassan Moustafa Sports Hall 1, Cairo; Referees: Diep (ARG), Magalhaes Da Silva (BRA)
18 September 2024; 12:30	Queirós 13	(7–8, 5–2, 5–4)	Talaat Abdo Abbas 7	Hassan Moustafa Sports Hall 1, Cairo; Referees: Diep (ARG), Magalhaes Da Silva (BRA)
18 September 2024; 12:30	1× (suspension)	Report	5× (suspension)	Hassan Moustafa Sports Hall 1, Cairo; Referees: Diep (ARG), Magalhaes Da Silva (BRA)

18 September 2024; 17:00	Portugal	2–0	Chile	Hassan Moustafa Sports Hall 1, Cairo; Referees: Fernandez (ESP), Bubalo (AUT)
18 September 2024; 17:00	Queirós 13	(8–6, 9–6)	Hernández 6	Hassan Moustafa Sports Hall 1, Cairo; Referees: Fernandez (ESP), Bubalo (AUT)
18 September 2024; 17:00	2× (suspension)	Report	1× (yellow card) 3× (suspension)	Hassan Moustafa Sports Hall 1, Cairo; Referees: Fernandez (ESP), Bubalo (AUT)

18 September 2024; 19:00	Egypt	2–0	India	Hassan Moustafa Sports Hall 1, Cairo; Referees: Campo Barbero (ESP), Carvalho (POR)
18 September 2024; 19:00	Talaat Abdo Abbas 16	(8–3, 8–2)	Ramavath 2	Hassan Moustafa Sports Hall 1, Cairo; Referees: Campo Barbero (ESP), Carvalho (POR)
18 September 2024; 19:00	1× (suspension)	Report	3× (suspension)	Hassan Moustafa Sports Hall 1, Cairo; Referees: Campo Barbero (ESP), Carvalho (POR)

== Knockout stage ==
=== Bracket ===
Quarterfinals
A1	Brazil	4	15
B4	India	2	7
A2	United States	4	8
B3	Chile	1	3
B1	Portugal	9	3	8
A4	France	8	11	11
B2	Egypt	6	9	5
A3	Japan	8	7	4

Semifinals
A1	Brazil	4	2	8
A2	United States	0	5	10
A4	France	4	6
B2	Egypt	6	7

Finals
A2	United States	1	6
B2	Egypt	6	12
Third place
A1	Brazil	12	12
A4	France	8	5

5–8th place semifinals
B4	India	7	6	6
B3	Chile	2	9	7
B1	Portugal	9	4	1
A3	Japan	8	11	4

Fifth place game
B3	Chile	5	1
A3	Japan	11	11
Seventh place game
B4	India	3	5
B1	Portugal	5	9

=== Quarterfinals ===
20 September 2024; 10:30	United States	2–0	Chile	Hassan Moustafa Sports Hall 2, Cairo; Attendance: 50; Referees: Magalhaes Da Silva (BRA), Bubalo (AUT)
20 September 2024; 10:30	Wolf 5	(4–1, 8–3)	Carrasco 2	Hassan Moustafa Sports Hall 2, Cairo; Attendance: 50; Referees: Magalhaes Da Silva (BRA), Bubalo (AUT)
20 September 2024; 10:30		Report		Hassan Moustafa Sports Hall 2, Cairo; Attendance: 50; Referees: Magalhaes Da Silva (BRA), Bubalo (AUT)

20 September 2024; 10:30	Brazil	2–0	India	Hassan Moustafa Sports Hall 1, Cairo; Attendance: 50; Referees: Santos (POR), Carvalho (POR)
20 September 2024; 10:30	Rodrigues 11	(4–2, 15–7)	Ramavath 5	Hassan Moustafa Sports Hall 1, Cairo; Attendance: 50; Referees: Santos (POR), Carvalho (POR)
20 September 2024; 10:30		Report	1× (suspension)	Hassan Moustafa Sports Hall 1, Cairo; Attendance: 50; Referees: Santos (POR), Carvalho (POR)

20 September 2024; 12:30	Egypt	2–1	Japan	Hassan Moustafa Sports Hall 2, Cairo; Attendance: 200; Referees: Bubalo (AUT), Diep ARG)
20 September 2024; 12:30	Talaat Abdo Abbas 15	(6–8, 9–7, 5–4)	Morooka 15	Hassan Moustafa Sports Hall 2, Cairo; Attendance: 200; Referees: Bubalo (AUT), Diep ARG)
20 September 2024; 12:30	1× (yellow card) 3× (suspension)	Report	1× (yellow card) 2× (suspension)	Hassan Moustafa Sports Hall 2, Cairo; Attendance: 200; Referees: Bubalo (AUT), Diep ARG)

20 September 2024; 12:30	Portugal	1–2	France	Hassan Moustafa Sports Hall 1, Cairo; Attendance: 50; Referees: Fernandez (ESP), Campo Barbero (ESP)
20 September 2024; 12:30	Queirós 10	(9–8, 3–11, 8–11)	Cuhadar 13	Hassan Moustafa Sports Hall 1, Cairo; Attendance: 50; Referees: Fernandez (ESP), Campo Barbero (ESP)
20 September 2024; 12:30	1× (suspension)	Report	3× (suspension)	Hassan Moustafa Sports Hall 1, Cairo; Attendance: 50; Referees: Fernandez (ESP), Campo Barbero (ESP)

=== 5–8th place semifinals ===
20 September 2024; 17:00	India	1–2	Chile	Hassan Moustafa Sports Hall 2, Cairo; Attendance: 30; Referees: Fernandez (ESP), Carvalho (POR)
20 September 2024; 17:00	Ramavath 12	(7–2, 6–9, 6–7)	Orellana 6	Hassan Moustafa Sports Hall 2, Cairo; Attendance: 30; Referees: Fernandez (ESP), Carvalho (POR)
20 September 2024; 17:00	2× (suspension)	Report	1× (yellow card) 1× (suspension)	Hassan Moustafa Sports Hall 2, Cairo; Attendance: 30; Referees: Fernandez (ESP), Carvalho (POR)

20 September 2024; 19:00	Portugal	1–2	Japan	Hassan Moustafa Sports Hall 2, Cairo; Attendance: 40; Referees: Magalhaes Da Silva (BRA), Bubalo (AUT)
20 September 2024; 19:00	Queirós 7	(9–8, 4–11, 1–4)	Morooka 17	Hassan Moustafa Sports Hall 2, Cairo; Attendance: 40; Referees: Magalhaes Da Silva (BRA), Bubalo (AUT)
20 September 2024; 19:00	2× (suspension)	Report	3× (suspension)	Hassan Moustafa Sports Hall 2, Cairo; Attendance: 40; Referees: Magalhaes Da Silva (BRA), Bubalo (AUT)

=== Semifinals ===
20 September 2024; 17:00	Brazil	1–2	United States	Hassan Moustafa Sports Hall 1, Cairo; Attendance: 100; Referees: Bubalo (AUT), Santos (POR)
20 September 2024; 17:00	Nunes Schug 5	(4–0, 2–5, 8–10)	Wolf 9	Hassan Moustafa Sports Hall 1, Cairo; Attendance: 100; Referees: Bubalo (AUT), Santos (POR)
20 September 2024; 17:00	1× (yellow card) 2× (suspension)	Report	1× (yellow card) 2× (suspension)	Hassan Moustafa Sports Hall 1, Cairo; Attendance: 100; Referees: Bubalo (AUT), Santos (POR)

20 September 2024; 19:00	France	0–2	Egypt	Hassan Moustafa Sports Hall 1, Cairo; Attendance: 150; Referees: Diep (ARG), Carvalho (POR)
20 September 2024; 19:00	Cuhadar 8	(4–6, 6–7)	Talaat Abdo Abbas 7	Hassan Moustafa Sports Hall 1, Cairo; Attendance: 150; Referees: Diep (ARG), Carvalho (POR)
20 September 2024; 19:00	1× (yellow card) 3× (suspension)	Report	1× (yellow card) 1× (suspension)	Hassan Moustafa Sports Hall 1, Cairo; Attendance: 150; Referees: Diep (ARG), Carvalho (POR)

=== Seventh place game ===
21 September 2024; 13:00	India	0–2	Portugal	Hassan Moustafa Sports Hall 1, Cairo; Attendance: 40; Referees: Diep (ARG), Campo Barbero (ESP)
21 September 2024; 13:00	Ramavath 6	(3–5, 5–9)	Jerónimo 5	Hassan Moustafa Sports Hall 1, Cairo; Attendance: 40; Referees: Diep (ARG), Campo Barbero (ESP)
21 September 2024; 13:00		Report		Hassan Moustafa Sports Hall 1, Cairo; Attendance: 40; Referees: Diep (ARG), Campo Barbero (ESP)

=== Fifth place game ===
21 September 2024; 15:00	Chile	0–2	Japan	Hassan Moustafa Sports Hall 1, Cairo; Attendance: 50; Referees: Carvalho (POR), Fernandez (ESP)
21 September 2024; 15:00	Carrasco 2	(5–11, 1–11)	Morooka 10	Hassan Moustafa Sports Hall 1, Cairo; Attendance: 50; Referees: Carvalho (POR), Fernandez (ESP)
21 September 2024; 15:00		Report	1× (suspension)	Hassan Moustafa Sports Hall 1, Cairo; Attendance: 50; Referees: Carvalho (POR), Fernandez (ESP)

=== Bronze medal game ===
21 September 2024; 17:00	Brazil	2–0	France	Hassan Moustafa Sports Hall 1, Cairo; Attendance: 100; Referees: Santos (POR), Bubalo (AUT)
21 September 2024; 17:00	Lourenço 10	(12–8, 12–5)	Cuhadar 10	Hassan Moustafa Sports Hall 1, Cairo; Attendance: 100; Referees: Santos (POR), Bubalo (AUT)
21 September 2024; 17:00	1× (suspension)	Report		Hassan Moustafa Sports Hall 1, Cairo; Attendance: 100; Referees: Santos (POR), Bubalo (AUT)

=== Gold medal game ===
21 September 2024; 19:00	United States	0–2	Egypt	Hassan Moustafa Sports Hall 1, Cairo; Attendance: 500; Referees: Bubalo (AUT), Magalhaes Da Silva (POR)
21 September 2024; 19:00	Smothers 3	(1–6, 6–12)	Talaat Abdo Abbas 15	Hassan Moustafa Sports Hall 1, Cairo; Attendance: 500; Referees: Bubalo (AUT), Magalhaes Da Silva (POR)
21 September 2024; 19:00	2× (suspension)	Report	1× (yellow card) 2× (suspension)	Hassan Moustafa Sports Hall 1, Cairo; Attendance: 500; Referees: Bubalo (AUT), Magalhaes Da Silva (POR)

== Final ranking ==
Rank	Team
1st place, gold medalist(s)	Egypt
2nd place, silver medalist(s)	United States
3rd place, bronze medalist(s)	Brazil
4	France
5	Japan
6	Chile
7	Portugal
8	India

== Website ==
Official website
