= India national wheelchair handball team =

India

Information
- Association: Handball Federation of India
- Coach: Anand Bajirao Mane

Colours
1st	2nd

Results

World Championship
- Appearances: 3
- Best result: Fourth place (2022)
- Last updated on 17 May 2026.

The India national wheelchair handball team is the national wheelchair handball team of India and is overseen by the Handball Federation of India.

== History ==
They participated at the first Four a Side World Championship in September 2022. They lost the fifth-place game in the penalty shootout against the Netherland. They finished the tournament at the sixth place out of six teams. Two months later at the Six a Side World Championship they lost again a penalty shootout at the third-place game against the Norwegian team and they finished fourth out of 9 teams. At this tournament they had 5 new players out of 12. Many of the players of the Six a Side World Championship squad were also wheelchair basketball player. Reena Gupa plays for the India women's national wheelchair basketball team.

== Competitive record ==
=== Wheelchair Handball World Championship ===
Apart from the Netherlands, the Indian national wheelchair handball team was the only other team to participate in both the Four a side and Six a Side World Championships in 2022.

IHF Wheelchair Handball World Championship record (Four a Side)
Year	Position	GP	W	L	SW	SL	SPW	SPL
2022 Egypt	6th	6	1	5	4	10	54	79
2024 Egypt	8th	6	0	6	2	12	63	95
Total	2/2	12	1	11	6	22	117	174

IHF Wheelchair Handball World Championship record (Six a Side)
Year	Position	GP	W	D	L	GF	GA
2022 Portugal	4th	6	3	0	3	68	78
Total	1/1	6	3	0	3	68	78
