= United States national wheelchair handball team =

United States

Information
- Association: USA Team Handball
- Coach: Mike Tilton

Colours
1st	2nd

Results

World Championship
- Appearances: 2
- Best result: (silver) (2024)
- Last updated on 2024-06-09.

The United States national wheelchair handball team is the national wheelchair handball team of the United States of America and is overseen by USA Team Handball.

== History ==
6 June 2024 USA Team Handball announced that they received a wild card for the 2024 Wheelchair Handball World Championship. One day later they announced the coaching staff and there will be try outs from 5 to 7 July 2024. They try outs were held at the Beard–Eaves–Memorial Coliseum at the Auburn University.

USA Team Handball sent a team to the 2026 Wheelchair Handball World Championship in September of 2026.

== Competitive record ==
=== Wheelchair Handball World Championship ===
IHF Wheelchair Handball World Championship record (Four a Side)
Year	Position	GP	W	L	SW	SL	SPW	SPL
2022 Egypt	Did not participated							
2024 Egypt	Runners-up	6	4	2	8	6	74	84
Total	1/2	6	4	2	8	6	74	84

IHF Wheelchair Handball World Championship record (Six a Side)
Year	Position	GP	W	D	L	GF	GA
2022 Portugal	Did not participated						
Total	0/1	0	0	0	0	0	0
