= Sweden national wheelchair handball team =

Sweden

Information
- Association: Swedish Handball Association (Svenska Handbollförbundet)

Colours
1st	2nd

Results

European Wheelchair Handball Nations’ Tournament
- Appearances: 2 (First in 2015)
- Best result: 3rd (2016)
- Last updated on 2018-08-15.

Sweden national wheelchair handball team
Medal record

European Wheelchair Handball Nations’ Tournament
Bronze medal – third place	2016 Sweden	

The Sweden national wheelchair handball team is the national wheelchair handball team of Sweden and is controlled by the Swedish Handball Association. The Sweden became third at the 2016 European Wheelchair Handball Nations’ Tournament as host country.

== Competitive record ==
=== European Wheelchair Handball Nations’ Tournament ===
European Wheelchair Handball Nations’ Tournamentrecord
Year	Round	Position	GP	W	D	L	GS	GA	GD
2015 Austria	Fourth place	4th of 4	4	1	0	3	46	70	-24
2016 Sweden	Third place	3rd of 4	4	1	0	3	40	66	-26
2018 Portugal	Did not enter								
2019 Croatia	Did not enter								
