= Egypt national wheelchair handball team =

Egypt

Information
- Association: Egyptian Handball Federation

Colours
1st	2nd

Results

World Championship
- Appearances: 2
- Best result: (gold) (2024)
- Last updated on 21 September 2024.

Egypt national wheelchair handball team
Medal record

IHF Wheelchair World Championship
Gold medal – first place	2024 Egypt	
Silver medal – second place	2022 Egypt	

The Egypt national wheelchair handball team is the national wheelchair handball team of Egypt and is controlled by the Egyptian Handball Federation. Egypt achieved a 1st place in third edition of the IHF Wheelchair World Championship Four a side, which was held in Egypt.

== Competitive record ==
IHF Wheelchair Handball World Championship
Games	Round	Position	Pld	W	L	SW	SL	SPW	SPL
2022 Egypt	Final	Runners-up	6	4	2	9	4	78	62
2024 Egypt	Final	Champions	6	5	1	11	3	98	73
2026 Spain	Quarter-Final	6th of 12	5	2	3	6	6	91	97
Total	Qualified: 3/3		17	11	6	26	13	267	232

== Team ==
The Egypt international squad at the 2022 Wheelchair World Championship.

Head coach: Wael Abdelaaty

No.	Pos.	Name	Date of birth (age)	Height	App.	Goals	Club
3		Ayyat Ahmed Said Mohamed Ibrahim (W)	3 March 2003 (age 23)	1.60 m	0	0
9		Ahmed Essam Khalil Abdelrahman (M)	3 June 1996 (age 30)	1.83 m	0	0
10		Samy Mansour Abdelrahman Elsabaawy (M)	6 February 1981 (age 45)	1.60 m	0	0
13		Rabie Hosni Hassanein Gouda (M)	16 February 1980 (age 46)	1.80 m	0	0
28		Wafaa Mohamed Abdallah Younis (W)	7 December 1975 (age 50)	1.55 m	0	0
44		Touba Magdi Mahmoud Issa (M)	12 October 1985 (age 40)	1.55 m	0	0
45		Mohamed Mohamed Hassabelnabi Ahmed (M)	29 April 1989 (age 37)	1.80 m	0	0
55		Magdy Talaat Abdo Abbas (M)	6 March 1996 (age 30)	1.20 m	0	0
66		Mohamed Anwar Ahmed Hassanein (M)	5 November 1982 (age 43)	1.82 m	0	0
99		Mohamed Farag Gomaa Abdelaziz (M)	9 February 1978 (age 48)	1.63 m	0	0
		Average	age 35.2	1.64 m	0	0

== See also ==
- Egypt men's national handball team
- Egypt men's national under-21 handball team
- Egypt men's national under-19 handball team
- Egypt men's national under-17 handball team
- Egypt men's national beach handball team
