= Hungary national wheelchair handball team =

Hungary

Information
- Association: Hungarian Handball Federation
- Coach: Takács Gabriella

Colours
1st	2nd

Results

European Wheelchair Handball Nations’ Tournament
- Appearances: 2 (First in 2018)
- Best result: 3rd (2019)
- Last updated on 2019-12-15.

Hungary national wheelchair handball team
Medal record

European Wheelchair Handball Nations’ Tournament
Bronze medal – third place	2019 Croatia	

The Hungary national wheelchair handball team is the national wheelchair handball team of Hungary and is controlled by the Hungarian Handball Federation.

== Competitive record ==
=== European Wheelchair Handball Nations’ Tournament ===
European Wheelchair Handball Nations’ Tournamentrecord
Year	Round	Position	GP	W	D	L	GS	GA	GD
2015 Austria	Did not enter								
2016 Sweden	Did not enter								
2018 Portugal	Fourth place	4th of 4	4	0	0	4	21	57	-36
2019 Croatia	Third place	3rd of 6	4	2	0	2	26	43	-17
