= Maja Užmah =

Slovenian handball player

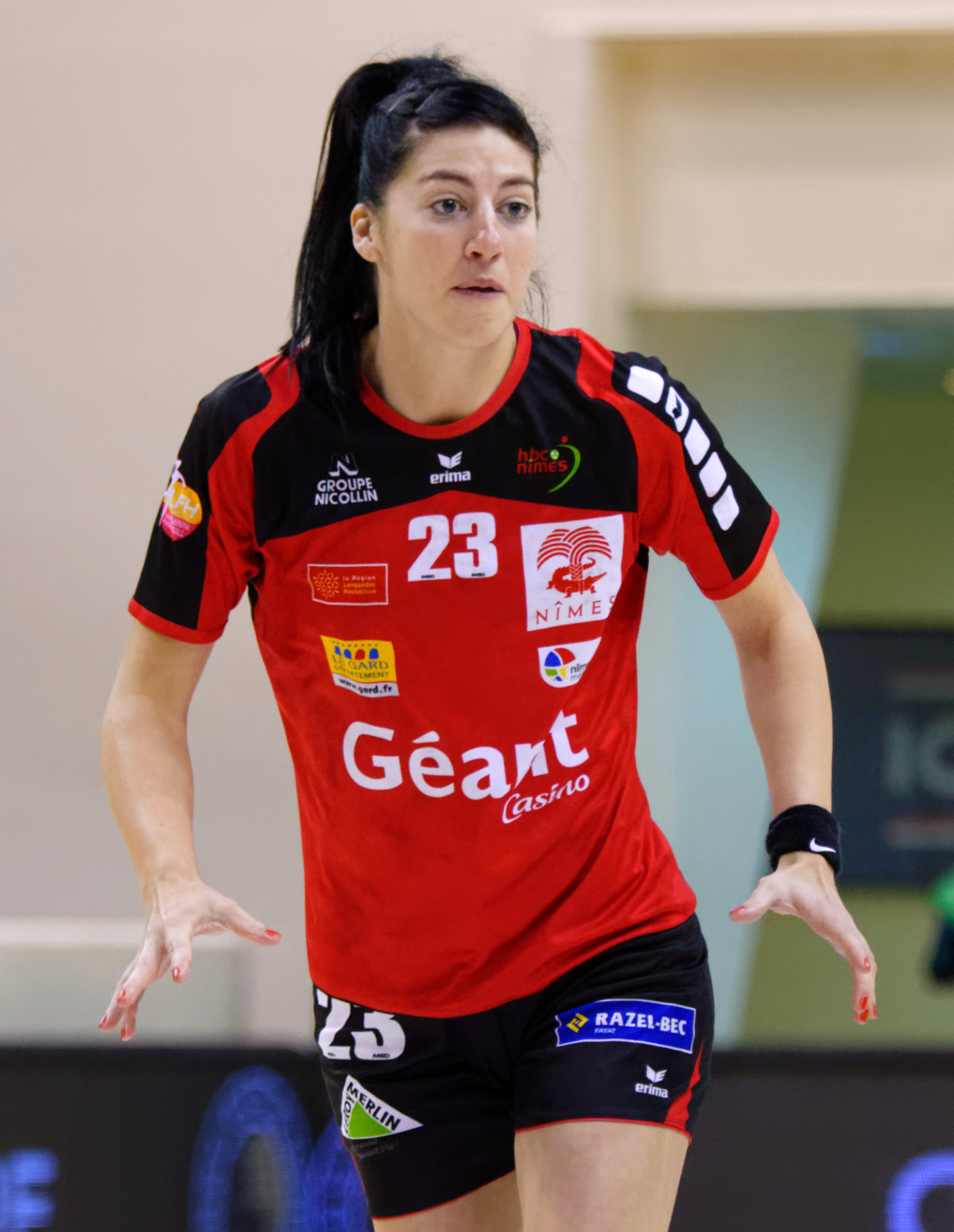

Personal information
- Nationality: Slovenian
- Born: 23 February 1988 (age 38) Pula, Slovenia
- Height: 1.82 m (5 ft 11 1/2 in)

Sport
- Sport: Handball
- Position: Left back
- Current club: HBC Celles-sur-Belle
- Number: 23
National team
Years	Team	Apps	(Gls)
–	Slovenia	43	(143)

Maja Užmah (born 23 February 1988) is a Slovenian handball player for HBC Celles-sur-Belle and the Slovenian national team.

She participated at the 2016 European Women's Handball Championship.

At the first Four-a-Side Wheelchair Handball World Championship which was held in 2022 she was listed as team official and head of delegation for the Slovenian team.
