= European Wheelchair Handball Nations' Tournament =

Sporting competition

- Current season, competition or edition: 2019 European Wheelchair Handball Nations’ Tournament
- Sport: wheelchair handball
- Founded: 2015
- First season: 2015
- No. of teams: 6
- Continent: EHF (Europe)
- Most recent champion: Portugal (3rd title)
- Most titles: Portugal (3rd title)

The European Wheelchair Handball Nations’ Tournament is the official competition for senior national Wheelchair handball teams of Europe and takes place every year since 2015 (except 2017).

Portugal are record champions with 3 continuous titles which came in 2018 and 2022 and 2026.

== Tournaments ==
Year	Host	Final			3rd place match			Teams
Year	Host	Champions	Score	Runners-up	3rd place	Score	4th place	Teams
2015; Details	Austria	Netherlands	14–11	Portugal	Norway	15–12	Sweden	4
2016; Details	Sweden	Netherlands	19–10	Portugal	Sweden	13–7	Italy	4
2017	No tournament							
2018; Details	Portugal	Portugal	20–7	Croatia	Netherlands	13–5	Hungary	4
2019; Details	Croatia	Croatia	9–8	Portugal	Hungary	6–3	Netherlands	6
2022; Details	Portugal	Portugal	18–10	Netherlands	Norway	15–14	India	9
2025; Details	Lithuania	Portugal	2–1	France	Lithuania	2–1	Croatia	9

== Medal count ==
Rank	Nation	Gold	Silver	Bronze	Total
1	Portugal	3	3	0	6
2	Netherlands	2	1	1	4
3	Croatia	1	1	0	2
4	France	0	1	0	1
5	Norway	0	0	2	2
6	Hungary	0	0	1	1
6	Lithuania	0	0	1	1
6	Sweden	0	0	1	1
Totals (8 entries)		6	6	6	18

== Participation details ==
Locations of the Tournaments and best result of each team

Legend

- 1st – Champions
- 2nd – Runners-up
- 3rd – Third place
- 4th – Fourth place
- • – Did not enter
- – Hosts

For each tournament, the number of teams in each finals tournament (in brackets) are shown.

Team	2015 (4)	2016 (4)	2018 (4)	2019 (6)	2025 (9)	Participations
Croatia	•	•	2nd	1st	4th	3
Hungary	•	•	4th	3rd	8th	3
Italy	•	4th	•	•	•	1
Netherlands	1st	1st	3rd	4th	9th	5
Norway	3rd	•	•	•	6th	2
Portugal	2nd	2nd	1st	2nd	1st	5
Romania	•	•	•	5th	7th	2
Slovenia	•	•	•	6th	•	1
Sweden	4th	3rd	•	•	•	2
Lithuania	•	•	•	•	3rd	1
France	•	•	•	•	2nd	1
Spain	•	•	•	•	5th	1

== Statistics ==
=== Total hosts ===
Hosts	Nations (Year(s)
1	Austria (2015); Sweden (2016); Portugal (2018); Croatia (2019); Lithuania (2025)

=== Most valuable player ===
Year	Player
2015	5 players
2016	5 players
2018	(Portugal) Ricardo Queiros

=== Best Goalkeeper ===
Year	Player
2015	(Netherlands) Joyce Van Haaster (1)
2016	(Netherlands) Joyce Van Haaster (2)
2018	(Netherlands) Joyce Van Haaster (3)

=== Top scorers by tournament ===
The record-holder for scored goals in a single Nations’ Tournament is Ademir Demirovic. He scored 26 goals for Croatia at the 2018 European Wheelchair Handball Nations’ Tournament that took place in Portugal.

Year	Player	Goals
2015	(Portugal) Serghei Mitrofan	17
2016	(Portugal) Iderlindo Gomes	22
2018	(Croatia) Ademir Demirovic	26
2019	(Croatia) Ante Štimac	25
2025	(Portugal) Ricardo Queiros	52
2025	(Croatia) Ante Štimac	52

=== All-time top scorers ===
Record

Rank	Nationality	Player	Goals	Tournaments	⌀T	Games	⌀G
1st place, gold medalist(s)	Portugal	Joao Jeronimo	43	3	14.33	12	3.58
2nd place, silver medalist(s)	Netherlands	Bart Neeft	37	3	12.33	12	3.08
3rd place, bronze medalist(s)	Portugal	Iderlindo Gomes	36	2	18	8	4.5
4	Portugal	Serghei Mitrofan	36	3	12	12	3
5	Netherlands	Martijn Dokkum	35	3	11.67	12	2.92
6	Croatia	Ademir Demirovic	26	1	26	4	6.5
7	Netherlands	Frank Hooning	25	2	12.5	8	3.125
8	Sweden	Kevin Johannessen	21	2	10.5	8	2.625
9	Portugal	Helder Farroba	18	2	9	8	2.25
10	Portugal	Ricardo Queiros	16	1	16	4	4
10	Croatia	Ante Stimac	16	1	16	4	4

Ranked: 1) Goals; 2) Average goals per tournament

Sources: &

== See also ==
- Wheelchair handball
- IHF Wheelchair Handball World Championship
- Pan American Wheelchair Handball Championship
