= Antoine Cariot =

Antoine Cariot (1820 in Écully – 22 February 1883 in Sainte-Foy-lès-Lyon) was a 19th-century French priest, mostly known as a botanist.

== Selected bibliography ==
The standard author abbreviation Cariot is used to indicate this person as the author when citing a botanical name.

- Étude des fleurs, botanique élémentaire, descriptive et usuelle, par Ludovic Chirat. 2ª ed. entièrement revue par l'abbé Cariot. Ed. Girard & Josserand, 1854;
- Notice biographique sur M. l'abbé Chirat de Souzy. Ed. Girard & Josserand, 1857
- Étude des fleurs. Botannique élémentaire, descriptive et usuelle. 3ª ed., entièrement revue et augmentée par l'abbé Cariot. Ed. Girard & Josserand, 1865;
- Étude des fleurs. Botannique élémentaire, descriptive et usuelle. 3ª ed., entièrement revue et augmentée par l'abbé Cariot. Ed. Girard & Josserand, 1872;
- Catalogue des plantes qui croissent aux environs de Brides-les-Bains, Salins et Moutiers. Ed. Impr. de C. Riotor, 1878;
- Étude des fleurs. Botanique élémentaire, descriptive et usuelle. 6ª ed., renfermant la flore du bassin moyen du Rhône et de la Loire. Ed. P.-N. Josserand, 1879;
- Étude des fleurs. Botanique élémentaire, descriptive et usuelle. 6ª ed., renfermant la flore du bassin moyen du Rhône et de la Loire. Ed. Vitte & Perrussel, 1888;
- Botanique élémentaire descriptive et usuelle, par l'abbé Cariot et le Dr Saint-Lager,... 8ª ed. Ed. E. Vitte, 1897.
