= IHF Wheelchair Handball World Championship =

International tournament

- Current season, competition or edition: 2024 Wheelchair Handball World Championship
- Sport: Wheelchair handball
- Founded: 26 October 2019; 7 years ago
- Founder: International Handball Federation
- First season: 2022
- Continent: International (IHF)
- Most recent champion: Spain (1st title)
- Most titles: Spain; Egypt; Portugal; Brazil (1 title)

The IHF Wheelchair Handball World Championship is the official competition for senior national Wheelchair handball teams of the world.

== History ==
In 2013 was already held a Wheelchair Handball World Championship organised by Brazil. But not officially recognized by the IHF. Brazil won all categories.

Since 2015 there exists the European Wheelchair Handball Nations’ Tournament.

On 26 October 2019 the first Meeting of IHF Wheelchair Handball Working Group was held. They planned the first Wheelchair Handball World Championship for 2021 during the 2021 World Women's Handball Championship.

During the IHF Council Meeting No. 6 on 27 and 28 February 2020 in Cairo the IHF announced that there will be the first Wheelchair Handball World Championship already in 2020. The IHF will add Wheelchair handball for the 2028 Summer Paralympics. But one of the requirement is that there were two world championships until 2022.

== Tournaments ==
=== 6×6 ===
Year	Host	Final			3rd place match			Teams
Year	Host	Champions	Score	Runners-up	3rd place	Score	4th place	Teams
2020	Sweden	Tournaments were cancelled due to the COVID-19 pandemic						
2021	Spain	Tournaments were cancelled due to the COVID-19 pandemic						
2022; Details	Portugal	Portugal	18–10	Netherlands	Norway	15–14	India	9

=== 4×4 ===
Year	Host	Final			3rd place match			Teams
Year	Host	Champions	Score	Runners-up	3rd place	Score	4th place	Teams
2022; Details	Egypt	Brazil	2–1	Egypt	Slovenia	2–0	Chile	6
2024; Details	Egypt	Egypt	2–0	United States	Brazil	2–0	France	8
2026; Details	Spain	Spain	2–1	Japan	Portugal	2–1	Chile	8

== Performance ==
=== 6×6 ===
Nation	Winner	Runner-up	Third place	Fourth place
Portugal	1 (2022 *)			
Netherlands		1 (2022)		
Norway			1 (2022)	
India				1 (2022)

=== 4×4 ===
Nation	Winner	Runner-up	Third place	Fourth place
Egypt	1 (2024 *)	1 (2022 *)		
Brazil	1 (2022)		1 (2024)	
Spain	1 (2026)			
United States		1 (2024)		
Japan		1 (2026)		
Slovenia			1 (2022)	
Portugal			1 (2026)	
Chile				2 (2022, 2026)
France				1 (2024)

== Statistics ==
=== Total hosts ===
Times hosted	Nations	Year(s)
2	Egypt	2022 4×4, 2024 4×4
1	Spain	2026 4×4
1	Portugal	2022 6×6

== Literature ==
- "XXVIII. Competition Manual for IHF Wheelchair Handball World Championships" (PDF). International Handball Federation. 27 February 2020. Archived (PDF) from the original on 29 June 2020.

== See also ==
- Wheelchair handball
- European Wheelchair Handball Nations' Tournament
- Pan American Wheelchair Handball Championship
