= Croatia national wheelchair handball team =

Croatia

Information
- Association: Croatian Handball Federation

Colours
1st	2nd

Results

European Wheelchair Handball Nations' Tournament
- Appearances: 2 (First in 2018)
- Best result: 1st (2019)
- Last updated on 2019-12-15.

Croatia national wheelchair handball team
Medal record

European Wheelchair Handball Nations' Tournament
Gold medal – first place	2019 Croatia	
Silver medal – second place	2018 Portugal	

The Croatia national wheelchair handball team is the national wheelchair handball team of Croatia and is controlled by the Croatian Handball Federation. It was European Champion of 2019 and Vice-Champion of 2018.

== Competitive record ==
=== European Wheelchair Handball Nations' Tournament ===
European Wheelchair Handball Nations' Tournament record
Year	Round	Position	GP	W	D	L	GS	GA	GD
(Austria) 2015	Did not enter								
(Sweden) 2016	Did not enter								
(Portugal) 2018	Runners-up	2nd of 4	4	2	0	2	56	58	-2
(Croatia) 2019	Champions	1st of 6	4	4	0	0	49	26	+23

=== World and European Wheelchair Handball Championship ===
European Wheelchair Handball Nations' Tournament record
Year	Round	Position (W)	Position (E)	GP	W	D	L	GS	GA	GD
(Portugal) 2022	Main Round	6th of 9	5th of 6							
