= Valjeviken =

- Location within Sweden
- Coordinates: 56°03′N 14°33′E
- Country: Sweden
- Province: Blekinge
- County: Blekinge County
- Municipality: Sölvesborg Municipality

Area
  - Total: 0.12 km^{2} (0.046 sq mi)

Population (2005-12-31)
  - Total: 211
  - Density: 1,802/km^{2} (4,670/sq mi)
- Time zone: UTC+1 (CET)
  - Summer (DST): UTC+2 (CEST)

Valjeviken is a village situated in Sölvesborg Municipality, Blekinge County, Sweden with 211 inhabitants in 2005.
