= Spain national wheelchair handball team =

Spain

Information
- Association: Royal Spanish Handball Federation
- Coach: Ricardo Alonso
- Captain: Óscar Perales

Colours
1st	2nd

Results

World Championship
- Appearances: 2 (First in 2022)
- Best result: (gold) Gold: (2026)
- Last updated on 2022-11-18.

The Spain national wheelchair handball team is the national wheelchair handball team of Spain and is controlled by the Royal Spanish Handball Federation.

== History ==
The Spanish team played there first game on 31 October 2021 against Portugal in León. They lost the game 10–26 (Halftime 2–13).

On 1 and 2 July 2022 they participated at the 2022 Euro Hand 4 All a 4 nations friendly tournament in France. Against Belgium they were able to win there first game. The game for place 3 they won again against Belgium and secured the bronze medal.

They are participating at the first 2022 World and European Wheelchair Handball Championship in Portugal.

The greatest rivalry is against Portugal, which they had also there first game. Since 2022 they play each other at the Troféu Internacional Vida. Portugal won both editions.

== Competitive record ==
=== European Wheelchair Handball Nations’ Tournament ===
They did not participated at the European Wheelchair Handball Nations’ Tournament.

=== Wheelchair Handball World Championship ===
IHF Wheelchair Handball World Championship record
Year	Position	GP	W	L	SW	SL	SPW	SPL
2022 Portugal	Fifth place							
Total	1/1							
