= 2022 World and European Wheelchair Handball Championship =

Tournament details
- Host country: Portugal
- Venue(s): 2 (in 1 host city)
- Dates: 18 – 20 November 2022
- Teams: 9 (from 2 confederations)

Final positions
- Champions: Portugal (1st title)
- Runners-up: Netherlands
- Third place: Norway
- Fourth place: India

Tournament statistics
- Matches played: 25
- Goals scored: 492 (19.68 per match)

The 2022 World and European Wheelchair Handball Championship was a wheelchair handball tournament held in Leiria, Portugal from 18 to 20 November 2022.

The competition featured nine teams, i.e., the host, two from Asia and six from Europe. The competition was played with mixed teams, i.e., each team must have at least three female players, while at least one female player per team must be on the court at any time.

== Qualification ==
Event	Vacancies	Qualified
IHF Executive Committee Meeting	1	Portugal
Asia	2	India; Pakistan
Europe	6	Croatia; Hungary; Netherlands; Norway; Romania; Spain

== Disqualification of Pakistan ==
Because Pakistan entered the competition only with nine players (two women) instead of twelve players (three women) they were disqualified by the tournament management. They are allowed to play their games, but all games were counted as 0–10 losses and 0–2 points for the opponent.

== Group A ==
Pos	Team	Pld	W	D	L	GF	GA	GD	Pts	Qualification
1	Norway	4	3	0	1	36	23	+13	6 (Note: Norway 12–10 Spain)	Semi-finals
2	Spain	4	3	0	1	50	32	+18	6	Quarter-finals
3	Croatia	4	2	1	1	40	30	+10	5	Quarter-finals
4	Hungary	4	1	1	2	29	30	−1	3	Consolation round
5	Pakistan	4	0	0	4	0	40	−40	0	Consolation round

Source: EHF
Rules for classification: 1) points; 2) head-to-head points; 3) head-to-head goal difference; 4) head-to-head number of goals scored; 5) goal difference.
Notes:

18 November 2022; 9:00	Croatia	11–7	Norway	Pavilhão do Lis, Leiria; Attendance: 50; Referees: Cacador, Santos (PRT)
18 November 2022; 9:00	Štimac 8	(7–5)	Strand 4	Pavilhão do Lis, Leiria; Attendance: 50; Referees: Cacador, Santos (PRT)
18 November 2022; 9:00	1× (suspension)	Report	2× (suspension)	Pavilhão do Lis, Leiria; Attendance: 50; Referees: Cacador, Santos (PRT)

18 November 2022; 11:00	Hungary	9–15	Spain	Pavilhão do Lis, Leiria; Attendance: 100; Referees: Begovic, Bubalo (AUT)
18 November 2022; 11:00	Domonkos 3	(4–9)	Garcia 8	Pavilhão do Lis, Leiria; Attendance: 100; Referees: Begovic, Bubalo (AUT)
18 November 2022; 11:00	3× (suspension)	Report	2× (suspension)	Pavilhão do Lis, Leiria; Attendance: 100; Referees: Begovic, Bubalo (AUT)

18 November 2022
13:00
Norway
10–0
Pakistan
Pavilhão do Lis, Leiria
Attendance: 50
Referees: Lahache, Soubrie (FRA)
Hoel & Lunde 4
(12–2)
Naveed 6

Report

FT: 20–11

18 November 2022; 15:00	Spain	15–11	Croatia	Pavilhão do Lis, Leiria; Attendance: 100; Referees: Cacador, Santos (PRT)
18 November 2022; 15:00	Gonzalez 7	Report	Štimac	Pavilhão do Lis, Leiria; Attendance: 100; Referees: Cacador, Santos (PRT)
18 November 2022; 15:00			5× (suspension)	Pavilhão do Lis, Leiria; Attendance: 100; Referees: Cacador, Santos (PRT)

18 November 2022
17:00
Pakistan
0–10
Hungary
Pavilhão do Lis, Leiria
Referees: Begovic, Bubalo (AUT)
Naveed 4
(2–10)
Tapai 4
1× (suspension)
Report
1× (suspension)

FT: 5–15

19 November 2022; 9:00	Norway	12–10	Spain	Pavilhão do Lis, Leiria; Attendance: 300; Referees: Asztalos, Matic (HUN)
19 November 2022; 9:00	Gran 4	(8–6)	Perales 5	Pavilhão do Lis, Leiria; Attendance: 300; Referees: Asztalos, Matic (HUN)
19 November 2022; 9:00	1× (yellow card) 3× (suspension)	Report	1× (suspension)	Pavilhão do Lis, Leiria; Attendance: 300; Referees: Asztalos, Matic (HUN)

19 November 2022; 11:00	Hungary	8–8	Croatia	Pavilhão do Lis, Leiria; Attendance: 100; Referees: Begovic, Bubalo (AUT)
19 November 2022; 11:00	Jancso 3	(4–5)	Štimac 4	Pavilhão do Lis, Leiria; Attendance: 100; Referees: Begovic, Bubalo (AUT)
19 November 2022; 11:00	1× (yellow card) 2× (suspension)	Report	1× (suspension)	Pavilhão do Lis, Leiria; Attendance: 100; Referees: Begovic, Bubalo (AUT)

19 November 2022
13:00
Pakistan
0–10
Spain
Pavilhão do Lis, Leiria
Referees: Begovic, Bubalo (AUT)
Naveed 7
(6–8)
Garcia 11
1× (suspension)
Report

FT: 11–23

19 November 2022; 14:15	Hungary	2–7	Norway	Pavilhão do Lis, Leiria; Referees: Cacador, Santos (PRT)
19 November 2022; 14:15	Bihari & Csala 1	(1–4)	Strand 4	Pavilhão do Lis, Leiria; Referees: Cacador, Santos (PRT)
19 November 2022; 14:15		Report	1× (suspension)	Pavilhão do Lis, Leiria; Referees: Cacador, Santos (PRT)

19 November 2022
16:00
Croatia
10–0
Pakistan
Pavilhão do Lis, Leiria
Referees: Asztalos, Matic (HUN)
Pesic 11
(9–3)
Pervaiz & Ullah 2
1× (suspension)
Report
2× (suspension)

FT: 17–5

== Group B ==
Pos	Team	Pld	W	D	L	GF	GA	GD	Pts	Qualification
1	Portugal (H)	3	3	0	0	59	33	+26	6	Semi-finals
2	India	3	2	0	1	30	29	+1	4	Quarter-finals
3	Netherlands	3	1	0	2	30	38	−8	2	Quarter-finals
4	Romania	3	0	0	3	25	44	−19	0	Consolation round

Source: EHF
Rules for classification: 1) points; 2) head-to-head points; 3) head-to-head goal difference; 4) head-to-head number of goals scored; 5) goal difference.
(H) Hosts

18 November 2022; 10:00	Portugal	20–10	Netherlands	Pavilhão Desportivo dos Pousos, Leiria; Attendance: 200; Referees: Duspara, Rogic (CRO)
18 November 2022; 10:00	Gomes 7	(9–3)	Van den Ende 7	Pavilhão Desportivo dos Pousos, Leiria; Attendance: 200; Referees: Duspara, Rogic (CRO)
18 November 2022; 10:00		Report	4× (suspension)	Pavilhão Desportivo dos Pousos, Leiria; Attendance: 200; Referees: Duspara, Rogic (CRO)

18 November 2022; 12:00	India	9–5	Romania	Pavilhão Desportivo dos Pousos, Leiria; Attendance: 100; Referees: Asztalos, Matic (HUN)
18 November 2022; 12:00	Choudhari 6	(5–2)	Punga & Albu 2	Pavilhão Desportivo dos Pousos, Leiria; Attendance: 100; Referees: Asztalos, Matic (HUN)
18 November 2022; 12:00	1× (suspension)	Report	1× (suspension)	Pavilhão Desportivo dos Pousos, Leiria; Attendance: 100; Referees: Asztalos, Matic (HUN)

18 November 2022; 14:00	Romania	10–21	Portugal	Pavilhão Desportivo dos Pousos, Leiria; Attendance: 250; Referees: Duspara, Rogic (CRO)
18 November 2022; 14:00	Punga & Albu 4	(7–11)	Jeronmino 7	Pavilhão Desportivo dos Pousos, Leiria; Attendance: 250; Referees: Duspara, Rogic (CRO)
18 November 2022; 14:00	2× (suspension)	Report	1× (yellow card)	Pavilhão Desportivo dos Pousos, Leiria; Attendance: 250; Referees: Duspara, Rogic (CRO)

18 November 2022; 16:00	Netherlands	6–8	India	Pavilhão Desportivo dos Pousos, Leiria; Attendance: 200; Referees: Asztalos, Matic (HUN)
18 November 2022; 16:00	Van den Ende 3	(5–4)	Choudhari 4	Pavilhão Desportivo dos Pousos, Leiria; Attendance: 200; Referees: Asztalos, Matic (HUN)
18 November 2022; 16:00	2× (yellow card) 1× (suspension)	Report		Pavilhão Desportivo dos Pousos, Leiria; Attendance: 200; Referees: Asztalos, Matic (HUN)

19 November 2022; 10:00	Netherlands	14–10	Romania	Pavilhão Desportivo dos Pousos, Leiria; Attendance: 50; Referees: Lahache, Soubrie (FRA)
19 November 2022; 10:00	Schot 6	(6–7)	Punga 5	Pavilhão Desportivo dos Pousos, Leiria; Attendance: 50; Referees: Lahache, Soubrie (FRA)
19 November 2022; 10:00	1× (suspension)	Report	1× (yellow card) 2× (suspension)	Pavilhão Desportivo dos Pousos, Leiria; Attendance: 50; Referees: Lahache, Soubrie (FRA)

19 November 2022; 12:00	Portugal	18–13	India	Pavilhão Desportivo dos Pousos, Leiria; Attendance: 300; Referees: Duspara, Rogic (CRO)
19 November 2022; 12:00	Queiros 7	(11–4)	Choudhari 9	Pavilhão Desportivo dos Pousos, Leiria; Attendance: 300; Referees: Duspara, Rogic (CRO)
19 November 2022; 12:00	1× (suspension)	Report	1× (suspension)	Pavilhão Desportivo dos Pousos, Leiria; Attendance: 300; Referees: Duspara, Rogic (CRO)

== Consolation round ==
Pos	Team	Pld	W	D	L	GF	GA	GD	Pts	Qualification
1	Hungary	2	2	0	0	21	10	+11	4	7th place
2	Romania	2	1	0	1	20	11	+9	2	8th place
3	Pakistan	2	0	0	2	0	20	−20	0	9th place

Source: EHF
Rules for classification: 1) points; 2) head-to-head points; 3) head-to-head goal difference; 4) head-to-head number of goals scored; 5) goal difference.

20 November 2022; 9:00	Hungary	11–10	Romania	Pavilhão do Lis, Leiria; Attendance: 100; Referees: Cacador, Santos (PRT)
20 November 2022; 9:00	Csala 4	(2–7)	Punga & Albu 5	Pavilhão do Lis, Leiria; Attendance: 100; Referees: Cacador, Santos (PRT)
20 November 2022; 9:00		Report	2× (suspension)	Pavilhão do Lis, Leiria; Attendance: 100; Referees: Cacador, Santos (PRT)

20 November 2022
12:00
Hungary
10–0
Pakistan
Pavilhão do Lis, Leiria
Attendance: 50
Referees: Lahache, Soubrie (FRA)
Tapai & Lelik 3
(10–0)
Naveed 3

Report

FT: 15–5

20 November 2022
15:00
Romania
10–0
Pakistan
Pavilhão Desportivo dos Pousos, Leiria
Referees: Dospara, Rogic (CRO)
Punga 6
(12–3)
Pervaiz 3
1× (suspension)
Report
1× (suspension)

FT: 18–7

== Knockout stage ==
=== Bracket ===
Quarterfinals
A2	Spain	18
B3	Netherlands	20
B2	India	13
A3	Croatia	11

Semifinals
A1	Norway	5
B3	Netherlands	11
B1	Portugal	23
B2	India	11
Fifth place
A2	Spain	14
A3	Croatia	13

Final
B3	Netherlands	10
B1	Portugal	18
Third place
A1	Norway	15
B2	India	14

=== Quarter-finals ===
19 November 2022
19:00
Spain
18–20
Netherlands
Pavilhão do Lis, Leiria
Attendance: 400
Referees: Cacador, Santos (PRT)
Perales 6
(3–7)
Appelman 9

Report
1× (suspension)

FT: 17–17 Pen: 1–3

19 November 2022
20:15
India
13–11
Croatia
Pavilhão Desportivo dos Pousos, Leiria
Attendance: 150
Referees: Lahache, Soubrie (FRA)
Shanmugam 6
(4–4)
Štimac 11
5× (suspension)
Report
1× (yellow card) 1× (suspension)

FT: 10–10 Pen: 3–1

=== Semi-finals ===
20 November 2022; 10:00	Norway	5–11	Netherlands	Pavilhão Desportivo dos Pousos, Leiria; Attendance: 100; Referees: Begovic, Bubalo (AUT)
20 November 2022; 10:00	Veda 3	(1–3)	Appelman 6	Pavilhão Desportivo dos Pousos, Leiria; Attendance: 100; Referees: Begovic, Bubalo (AUT)
20 November 2022; 10:00	1× (suspension)	Report	1× (suspension)	Pavilhão Desportivo dos Pousos, Leiria; Attendance: 100; Referees: Begovic, Bubalo (AUT)

20 November 2022; 12:00	Portugal	23–11	India	Pavilhão do Lis, Leiria; Attendance: 500; Referees: Asztalos, Matic (HUN)
20 November 2022; 12:00	Queiros 10	(10–3)	Shanmugam 4	Pavilhão do Lis, Leiria; Attendance: 500; Referees: Asztalos, Matic (HUN)
20 November 2022; 12:00		Report		Pavilhão do Lis, Leiria; Attendance: 500; Referees: Asztalos, Matic (HUN)

=== Fifth place game ===
20 November 2022; 13:00	Spain	14–13	Croatia	Pavilhão Desportivo dos Pousos, Leiria; Attendance: 100; Referees: Begovic, Bubalo (AUT)
20 November 2022; 13:00	Gomar 7	(4–6)	Štimac 6	Pavilhão Desportivo dos Pousos, Leiria; Attendance: 100; Referees: Begovic, Bubalo (AUT)
20 November 2022; 13:00	1× (suspension)	Report	2× (suspension)	Pavilhão Desportivo dos Pousos, Leiria; Attendance: 100; Referees: Begovic, Bubalo (AUT)

=== Third place game ===
20 November 2022
16:15
Norway
15–14
India
Pavilhão Desportivo dos Pousos, Leiria
Attendance: 500
Referees: Cacador, Santos (PRT)
Veda 5
(2–8)
Choudhari 8
2× (suspension)
Report
1× (suspension)

FT: 11–11 Pen: 4–3

=== Final ===
20 November 2022; 18:00	Netherlands	10–18	Portugal	Pavilhão Desportivo dos Pousos, Leiria; Attendance: 500; Referees: Lahache, Soubrie (FRA)
20 November 2022; 18:00	Van den Ende 6	(7–9)	Queiros 9	Pavilhão Desportivo dos Pousos, Leiria; Attendance: 500; Referees: Lahache, Soubrie (FRA)
20 November 2022; 18:00	3× (suspension)	Report	1× (suspension)	Pavilhão Desportivo dos Pousos, Leiria; Attendance: 500; Referees: Lahache, Soubrie (FRA)

== Final ranking ==
=== World Championship ===
Rank	Team
1st place, gold medalist(s)	Portugal
2nd place, silver medalist(s)	Netherlands
3rd place, bronze medalist(s)	Norway
4	India
5	Spain
6	Croatia
7	Hungary
8	Romania
DSQ	Pakistan

=== European Championship ===
Rank	Team
1st place, gold medalist(s)	Portugal
2nd place, silver medalist(s)	Netherlands
3rd place, bronze medalist(s)	Norway
4	Spain
5	Croatia
6	Hungary
7	Romania

== Website ==
Official website
