= Norway national wheelchair handball team =

National wheelchair handball team of Norway

Norway

Information
- Association: Norwegian Handball Federation

Colours
1st	2nd

Results

World Championship
- Appearances: 1
- Best result: 3rd (2022)

European Wheelchair Handball Nations’ Tournament
- Appearances: 1 (First in 2015)
- Best result: (bronze) 3rd (2015),(2022)
- Last updated on 2025-02-29.

Norway national wheelchair handball team
Medal record

European Wheelchair Handball Nations’ Tournament
Bronze medal – third place	2015 Austria	
Bronze medal – third place	2022 Portugal	

The Norwegian national wheelchair handball team is the national wheelchair handball team of Norway and is controlled by the Norwegian Handball Federation. The Sweden became third at the 2015 European Wheelchair Handball Nations’ Tournament.

== Competitive record ==
=== European Wheelchair Handball Nations’ Tournament ===
European Wheelchair Handball Nations’ Tournamentrecord
Year	Round	Position	GP	W	D	L	GS	GA	GD
2015 Austria	Third place	3rd of 4	4	1	0	3	36	60	-24
2016 Sweden	Did not enter								
2018 Portugal	Did not enter								
2019 Croatia	Did not enter								
2022 Portugal	Third place	3rdof							
