= Netherlands national wheelchair handball team =

Netherlands

Information
- Nickname: Oranje
- Association: Netherlands Handball Association
- Coach: Piet Neeft

Colours
1st	2nd

Results

World Championship
- Appearances: 1
- Best result: (silver) 2rd (2022)

European Wheelchair Handball Nations’ Tournament
- Appearances: 4 (First in 2015)
- Best result: (gold) 1st (2015 & 2016)
- Last updated on 2019-12-15.

Netherlands national wheelchair handball team
Medal record

European Wheelchair Handball Nations’ Tournament
Gold medal – first place	2015 Austria	
Gold medal – first place	2016 Sweden	
Bronze medal – third place	2018 Portugal	
Silver medal – second place	2022 Portugal	

The Netherlands national wheelchair handball team is the national wheelchair handball team of Netherlands and is controlled by the Netherlands Handball Association. The Netherlands won the only two editions of the European Wheelchair Handball Nations’ Tournament.

== Competitive record ==
=== European Wheelchair Handball Nations’ Tournament ===
European Wheelchair Handball Nations’ Tournament record
Year	Round	Position	GP	W	D	L	GS	GA	GD
2015 Austria	Champions	1st of 4	4	4	0	0	58	36	+26
2016 Sweden	Champions	1st of 4	4	3	1	0	92	36	+56
2018 Portugal	Third place	3rd of 4	4	2	0	2	47	39	8
2019 Croatia	Fourth place	4th of 6	4	1	0	3	31	33	-2
2022 Portugal	Silver	2rd							
Total	2 titles	4 / 4	16	10	1	5	228	144	84

=== Wheelchair Handball World Championship ===
IHF Wheelchair Handball World Championship record
Year	Position	GP	W	L	SW	SL	SPW	SPL
2022 Egypt	5th	6	2	4	5	9	52	81
Total	1/1	6	2	4	5	9	52	81

== Current squad ==
The Dutch international squad at the 2018 European Wheelchair Handball Nations’ Tournament

Head coach:Piet Neeft

Player	Club
Romee Achterberg	Quintus
Robert Appelmann	Westfriesland SEW
Martijn Bakker	Westfriesland SEW
Mayenka de Bruin	CSV Handbal
Martijn Dokkum	CSV Handbal
William van den Ende	Quintus
Vera Enthoven	Quintus
Cor's Gravenmade	Quintus
Joyce van Haaster	CSV Handbal
Frank Hooning	CSV Handbal
Bart Neeft	CSV Handbal
Yves Nkomezi	Quintus
Maurice Poot	Quintus
John Schot	Westfriesland SEW
Arie Tamerus	Quintus
Jarno van Wanrooij	HCB'92
