= 2022 Wheelchair Handball World Championship =

1st IHF Four-a-Side Wheelchair Handball World Championship 2022

Tournament details
- Host country: Egypt
- Venue(s): 1 (in 1 host city)
- Dates: 22–25 September 2022
- Teams: 6 (from 4 confederations)

Final positions
- Champions: Brazil (1st title)
- Runners-up: Egypt
- Third place: Slovenia
- Fourth place: Chile

The 2022 IHF Wheelchair Handball World Championship is the first edition of the tournament. It was held in Hassan Moustafa Sports Hall in the 6th of October City, Egypt from 22 to 25 September 2022.

The competition features six teams, i.e., the host, one from Asia, and two each from Europe, and South and Central America. The competition is played with mixed teams, i.e., each team must have at least two female players, while at least one female player per team must be on the court at any time.

== Qualification ==
Event	Vacancies	Qualified
IHF Executive Committee Meeting	1	Egypt
Asia	1	India
Europe	2	Netherlands; Slovenia
South and Central America	2	Brazil; Chile

== Standings ==
Pos	Team	Pld	W	L	Pts	SW	SL	SR	SPW	SPL	SPR	Qualification
1	Brazil	5	5	0	10	10	0	MAX	91	26	3.500	Final
2	Egypt (H)	5	4	1	8	8	2	4.000	65	42	1.548	Final
3	Chile	5	2	3	4 (Note: Chile 2–0 Slovenia)	4	6	0.667	41	64	0.641	Third place game
4	Slovenia	5	2	3	4	4	8	0.500	51	62	0.823	Third place game
5	India (Note: The Netherlands and India have one extra point because they won a set at the lose against Slovenia.)	5	1	4	3 (Note: India 2–0 Netherlands)	3	8	0.375	39	67	0.582	Fifth place game
6	Netherlands	5	1	4	3	3	8	0.375	40	66	0.606	Fifth place game

Source: IHF
Rules for classification: 1) Points; 2) Head-to-head points; 3) Head-to-head set difference; 4) Head-to-head points won; 5) Set difference; 6) Points won; 7) Draw.
(H) Host
Notes:

22 September 2022; 10:00	Chile	0–2	Netherlands	Hassan Moustafa Sports Hall 2, 6th of October; Referees: Magalhaes (BRA), Manas (PAK)
22 September 2022; 10:00	Hernández 4	(3–5, 4–6)	Van den Ende 9	Hassan Moustafa Sports Hall 2, 6th of October; Referees: Magalhaes (BRA), Manas (PAK)
22 September 2022; 10:00	1× (suspension)	Report		Hassan Moustafa Sports Hall 2, 6th of October; Referees: Magalhaes (BRA), Manas (PAK)

22 September 2022; 10:00	Brazil	2–0	Slovenia	Hassan Moustafa Sports Hall 1, 6th of October; Referees: Caçador (POR), Bubalo (AUT)
22 September 2022; 10:00	Lourenço 6	(7–3, 7–2)	Arh 3	Hassan Moustafa Sports Hall 1, 6th of October; Referees: Caçador (POR), Bubalo (AUT)
22 September 2022; 10:00		Report	1× (suspension)	Hassan Moustafa Sports Hall 1, 6th of October; Referees: Caçador (POR), Bubalo (AUT)

22 September 2022; 12:00	Egypt	2–0	India	Hassan Moustafa Sports Hall 1, 6th of October; Referees: Asztalos (HUN), Kashiwaba (JPN)
22 September 2022; 12:00	Talaat Abdo Abbas 11	(11–1, 5–1)	Choudhari & Ramavath 1	Hassan Moustafa Sports Hall 1, 6th of October; Referees: Asztalos (HUN), Kashiwaba (JPN)
22 September 2022; 12:00		Report		Hassan Moustafa Sports Hall 1, 6th of October; Referees: Asztalos (HUN), Kashiwaba (JPN)

22 September 2022; 16:30	India	0–2	Chile	Hassan Moustafa Sports Hall1, 6th of October; Referees: Sanors (POR), Sultan (PAK)
22 September 2022; 16:30	Shanmugam 5	(2–3, 5–6)	Angel Hernández 3	Hassan Moustafa Sports Hall1, 6th of October; Referees: Sanors (POR), Sultan (PAK)
22 September 2022; 16:30	1× (suspension)	Report		Hassan Moustafa Sports Hall1, 6th of October; Referees: Sanors (POR), Sultan (PAK)

22 September 2022; 16:30	Netherlands	0–2	Brazil	Hassan Moustafa Sports Hall 2, 6th of October; Referees: Asztalos (HUN), Caçador (POR)
22 September 2022; 16:30	Van Haaster 3	(3–9, 4–12)	Rodrigues 7	Hassan Moustafa Sports Hall 2, 6th of October; Referees: Asztalos (HUN), Caçador (POR)
22 September 2022; 16:30		Report		Hassan Moustafa Sports Hall 2, 6th of October; Referees: Asztalos (HUN), Caçador (POR)

22 September 2022; 18:30	Slovenia	0–2	Egypt	Hassan Moustafa Sports Hall 1, 6th of October; Referees: Bubalo (AUT), Manas (PAK)
22 September 2022; 18:30	Slapničar 4	(5–9, 5–6)	Talaat Abdo Abbas 8	Hassan Moustafa Sports Hall 1, 6th of October; Referees: Bubalo (AUT), Manas (PAK)
22 September 2022; 18:30	1× (suspension) 1× (red card)	Report	2× (suspension)	Hassan Moustafa Sports Hall 1, 6th of October; Referees: Bubalo (AUT), Manas (PAK)

23 September 2022; 10:00	Netherlands	1–2	Slovenia	Hassan Moustafa Sports Hall 1, 6th of October; Referees: Magalhaes (BRA), Sultan (PAK)
23 September 2022; 10:00	Van den Ende 4	(4–3, 1–5, 1–2)	Arh & Škorjanc 4	Hassan Moustafa Sports Hall 1, 6th of October; Referees: Magalhaes (BRA), Sultan (PAK)
23 September 2022; 10:00	2× (suspension) 1× (red card)	Report		Hassan Moustafa Sports Hall 1, 6th of October; Referees: Magalhaes (BRA), Sultan (PAK)

23 September 2022; 10:00	Brazil	2–0	India	Hassan Moustafa Sports Hall 2, 6th of October; Referees: Asztalos (HUN), Santos (POR)
23 September 2022; 10:00	Rodrigues 6	(5–4, 12–0)	Choudhari 4	Hassan Moustafa Sports Hall 2, 6th of October; Referees: Asztalos (HUN), Santos (POR)
23 September 2022; 10:00		Report		Hassan Moustafa Sports Hall 2, 6th of October; Referees: Asztalos (HUN), Santos (POR)

23 September 2022; 12:00	Chile	0–2	Egypt	Hassan Moustafa Sports Hall 1, 6th of October; Referees: Kashiwaba (JPN), Manas (PAK)
23 September 2022; 12:00	Carrasco 3	(5–8, 2–5)	3 players 3	Hassan Moustafa Sports Hall 1, 6th of October; Referees: Kashiwaba (JPN), Manas (PAK)
23 September 2022; 12:00	1× (suspension)	Report	2× (suspension) 1× (red card)	Hassan Moustafa Sports Hall 1, 6th of October; Referees: Kashiwaba (JPN), Manas (PAK)

23 September 2022; 16:30	India	2–0	Netherlands	Hassan Moustafa Sports Hall 1, 6th of October; Referees: Magalhaes (BRA), Santos (POR)
23 September 2022; 16:30	Choudhari 9	(7–6, 7–2)	Van Haaster 4	Hassan Moustafa Sports Hall 1, 6th of October; Referees: Magalhaes (BRA), Santos (POR)
23 September 2022; 16:30	1× (suspension)	Report	1× (suspension) 1× (red card)	Hassan Moustafa Sports Hall 1, 6th of October; Referees: Magalhaes (BRA), Santos (POR)

23 September 2022; 16:30	Chile	2–0	Slovenia	Hassan Moustafa Sports Hall 2, 6th of October; Referees: Kashiwaba (JPN), Sultan (PAK)
23 September 2022; 16:30	Angel Hernández 6	(9–4, 6–5)	Arh & Škorjanc 3	Hassan Moustafa Sports Hall 2, 6th of October; Referees: Kashiwaba (JPN), Sultan (PAK)
23 September 2022; 16:30		Report		Hassan Moustafa Sports Hall 2, 6th of October; Referees: Kashiwaba (JPN), Sultan (PAK)

23 September 2022; 18:30	Egypt	0–2	Brazil	Hassan Moustafa Sports Hall 1, 6th of October; Referees: Bubalo (AUT), Caçador (POR)
23 September 2022; 18:30	3 players 4	(4–5, 3–10)	Lourenço 6	Hassan Moustafa Sports Hall 1, 6th of October; Referees: Bubalo (AUT), Caçador (POR)
23 September 2022; 18:30	2× (suspension)	Report	1× (suspension)	Hassan Moustafa Sports Hall 1, 6th of October; Referees: Bubalo (AUT), Caçador (POR)

24 September 2022; 15:00	Brazil	2–0	Chile	Hassan Moustafa Sports Hall 1, 6th of October; Referees: Bubalo (AUT), Aszatalos (HUN)
24 September 2022; 15:00	Amaral 9	(12–1, 12–2)	3 players 1	Hassan Moustafa Sports Hall 1, 6th of October; Referees: Bubalo (AUT), Aszatalos (HUN)
24 September 2022; 15:00		Report		Hassan Moustafa Sports Hall 1, 6th of October; Referees: Bubalo (AUT), Aszatalos (HUN)

24 September 2022; 17:00	India	1–2	Slovenia	Hassan Moustafa Sports Hall 1, 6th of October; Referees: Caçador (POR), Santos (POR)
24 September 2022; 17:00	Shanmugam 8	(7–6, 3–7, 2–4)	Arh 9	Hassan Moustafa Sports Hall 1, 6th of October; Referees: Caçador (POR), Santos (POR)
24 September 2022; 17:00	1× (suspension)	Report		Hassan Moustafa Sports Hall 1, 6th of October; Referees: Caçador (POR), Santos (POR)

24 September 2022; 19:00	Netherlands	0–2	Egypt	Hassan Moustafa Sports Hall 1, 6th of October; Referees: Magalhaes (BRA), Kashiwaba (JPN)
24 September 2022; 19:00	Van den Ende 4	(5–7, 3–7)	3 players 4	Hassan Moustafa Sports Hall 1, 6th of October; Referees: Magalhaes (BRA), Kashiwaba (JPN)
24 September 2022; 19:00		Report		Hassan Moustafa Sports Hall 1, 6th of October; Referees: Magalhaes (BRA), Kashiwaba (JPN)

== Knockout stage ==
=== Fifth place game ===
25 September 2022; 15:00	India	1–2	Netherlands	Hassan Moustafa Sports Hall 1, 6th of October; Referees: Manas (PAK), Santos (POR)
25 September 2022; 15:00		(5–7, 10–3, 0–2)		Hassan Moustafa Sports Hall 1, 6th of October; Referees: Manas (PAK), Santos (POR)
25 September 2022; 15:00		Report		Hassan Moustafa Sports Hall 1, 6th of October; Referees: Manas (PAK), Santos (POR)

=== Third place game ===
25 September 2022; 17:00	Chile	0–2	Slovenia	Hassan Moustafa Sports Hall 1, 6th of October; Referees: Magalhaes (BRA), Caçador (POR)
25 September 2022; 17:00		(6–7, 2–6)		Hassan Moustafa Sports Hall 1, 6th of October; Referees: Magalhaes (BRA), Caçador (POR)
25 September 2022; 17:00		Report		Hassan Moustafa Sports Hall 1, 6th of October; Referees: Magalhaes (BRA), Caçador (POR)

=== Final ===
25 September 2022; 19:00	Brazil	2–1	Egypt	Hassan Moustafa Sports Hall 1, 6th of October; Referees: Bubalo (AUT), Asztalos (HUN)
25 September 2022; 19:00		(8–3, 6–7, 6–3)		Hassan Moustafa Sports Hall 1, 6th of October; Referees: Bubalo (AUT), Asztalos (HUN)
25 September 2022; 19:00		Report		Hassan Moustafa Sports Hall 1, 6th of October; Referees: Bubalo (AUT), Asztalos (HUN)

== Final ranking ==
Rank	Team
1st place, gold medalist(s)	Brazil
2nd place, silver medalist(s)	Egypt
3rd place, bronze medalist(s)	Slovenia
4	Chile
5	Netherlands
6	India

== Team rosters ==
=== Brazil ===
Head coach: Samuel Vieira, Assistant coach: Gévelyn Almeida, Official: Rudney Uezu

No.	Pos.	Name	Date of birth (age)	Height	App.	Goals	Club
4	P	Eliana Lima (W)	15 December 1980 (age 44)	1.63 m	0	0
5	LB	Shirlei Januário (W)	30 May 1990 (age 35)	1.65 m	0	0
6	LB	Jordean Rodrigues (M)	11 June 1986 (age 39)	1.75 m	0	0
7	P	Cristiane Navarro (W)	6 January 1979 (age 46)	1.67 m	1	0
8	GK	Anderson Ferreira (M)	21 March 1979 (age 46)	1.55 m	0	0
9	RW	Paulo Franco (M)	25 March 1992 (age 33)	1.71 m	15	17
11	LW	Guilherme Lourenço (M)	10 June 1993 (age 32)	1.83 m	0	0
13	CB	Aline de Sousa (W)	6 June 1980 (age 45)	1.64 m	1	10
14	CB	Marcelo Amaral (M)	14 June 1980 (age 45)	1.95 m	0	0
15	GK	Claudinei Marques Dias (M)	26 October 1972 (age 52)	1.72 m	11	20
		Average	age 38.7	1.71 m	2.8	4.7

=== Chile ===
Head coach: William Andrade, Physician: Raul Smith, Physiotherapist: Amaya Iribarren

No.	Pos.	Name	Date of birth (age)	Height	App.	Goals	Club
2	RB	Luz Carrasco (W)	2 June 1992 (age 33)	1.40 m	0	0	(Chile) DACh
6	P	Angel Hernández (M)	6 November 2002 (age 22)	1.64 m	0	0	(Chile) DACh
7	CB	Catalina Jimeno (W)	13 November 1981 (age 43)	1.49 m	0	0	(Chile) DACh
9	P	Pablo Suarez (M)	14 May 1980 (age 45)	1.66 m	0	0	(Chile) BioBio
10	RB	Carlos Jara (M)	4 January 1986 (age 39)	1.75 m	0	0	(Chile) Gladiadores
11	CB	Alexis Caballero (M)	29 July 1989 (age 35)	1.70 m	0	0	(Chile) DACh
12	GK	Juan Peña (M)	4 February 1988 (age 37)	1.67 m	0	0	(Chile) Vikingos Adaptados
18	GK	Jonathan Veas (M)	24 June 1981 (age 44)	1.74 m	0	0	(Chile) Vikingos Adaptados
24	CB	Daniela Zapata (W)	6 April 1988 (age 37)	1.50 m	0	0	(Chile) DACh
46	LB	Alvaro Naranjo (M)	19 May 1982 (age 43)	1.60 m	0	0	(Chile) Vikingos Adaptados
		Average	age 34.9	1.62 m	0	0

=== Egypt ===
Head coach: Wael Abdelaaty Sayed Aly, Assistant coach: Ibrahim Mohamed Nasreldin Younes, Official: Karam Mohamed Morsy Abdelkader, Physiotherapist: Romany Nabil Welson Hanna

No.	Pos.	Name	Date of birth (age)	Height	App.	Goals	Club
3		Ayyat Ahmed Said Mohamed Ibrahim (W)	3 March 2003 (age 22)	1.60 m	0	0
9		Ahmed Essam Khalil Abdelrahman (M)	3 June 1996 (age 29)	1.83 m	0	0
10		Samy Mansour Abdelrahman Elsabaawy (M)	6 February 1981 (age 44)	1.60 m	0	0
13		Rabie Hosni Hassanein Gouda (M)	16 February 1980 (age 45)	1.80 m	0	0
28		Wafaa Mohamed Abdallah Younis (W)	7 December 1975 (age 49)	1.55 m	0	0
44		Touba Magdi Mahmoud Issa (M)	12 October 1985 (age 39)	1.55 m	0	0
45		Mohamed Mohamed Hassabelnabi Ahmed (M)	29 April 1989 (age 36)	1.80 m	0	0
55		Magdy Talaat Abdo Abbas (M)	6 March 1996 (age 29)	1.20 m	0	0
66		Mohamed Anwar Ahmed Hassanein (M)	5 November 1982 (age 42)	1.82 m	0	0
99		Mohamed Farag Gomaa Abdelaziz (M)	9 February 1978 (age 47)	1.63 m	0	0
		Average	age 35.2	1.64 m	0	0

=== India ===
Head coach: Anand Bajirao Mane, Assistant coach: Louis George Meprath, Official: Harjit Kaur Singh, Official: Kapil Kailash Agarwal

No.	Pos.	Name	Date of birth (age)	Height	App.	Goals	Club
1	GK	Ramesh Shanmugam (M)	9 April 1994 (age 31)	1.64 m	0	0
5	LB	Anil Kumar Kachhi (M)	12 May 1985 (age 40)	1.65 m	0	0
6	RB	Ajit Kumar Shukla (M)	1 January 1980 (age 45)	1.67 m	0	0
7	LW	Javed Ramjan Choudhari (M)	1 April 1994 (age 31)	1.80 m	0	0
8	LW	Suchitra Parida (W)	26 January 1993 (age 32)	1.73 m	0	0
9	CB	Suresh Kumar Karki (M)	23 September 1974 (age 50)	1.73 m	0	0
10	RW	Minakshi Harichandra Jadhav (W)	13 August 1988 (age 36)	1.64 m	0	0
12	GK	Koteshwar Ramavath (M)	8 May 1991 (age 34)	1.80 m	0	0
15	LB	Sudhanshu Pintu Patel (M)	29 September 1997 (age 27)	1.64 m	0	0
20	CB	Geeta Pannalal Chouhan (W)	7 October 1987 (age 37)	1.59 m	0	0
		Average	age 33.5	1.69 m	0	0

=== Netherlands ===
Head coach: Menno de Klerk, Official: Wilma Reincke, Official: Henne Van Es

No.	Pos.	Name	Date of birth (age)	Height	App.	Goals	Club
1	GK	Joyce Van Haaster (W)	10 June 1977 (age 48)	1.83 m	16	1	(Netherlands) C.S.V. Handbal
2	P	William Van den Ende (M)	27 January 1971 (age 54)	1.87 m	12	27	(Netherlands) Quintus
3	LW	Marcel Jansen (M)	1 April 1977 (age 48)	1.95 m	3	2	(Netherlands) C.S.V. Handbal
5	RW	Bas Jonker (M)	23 July 1982 (age 42)	2.00 m	4	4	(Netherlands) Quintus
7	LW	Irene Beemster (W)	21 December 1984 (age 40)	1.72 m	0	0	(Netherlands) C.S.V. Handbal
8	LW	Maurice Poot (M)	21 February 1978 (age 47)	1.87 m	8	3	(Netherlands) Quintus
9	LW	Sanne Dolstra (W)	4 April 1984 (age 41)	1.63 m	0	0	(Netherlands) Najaden
12	GK	Leendert Stoel (M)	30 November 1992 (age 32)	1.92 m	0	0	(Netherlands) Foreholte
13	RW	John Schot (M)	27 November 1975 (age 49)	1.87 m	4	7	(Netherlands) C.S.V. Handbal
16	LW	Mieke Van Chastelet (W)	30 December 1966 (age 58)	1.78 m	8	1	(Netherlands) C.S.V. Handbal
		Average	age 43.0	1.84 m	5.5	4.5

=== Slovenia ===
Head coach: Tone Barič, Official: Maja Užmah, Support staff: Jožef Jeraj, Physiotherapist: Azra Imamović

No.	Pos.	Name	Date of birth (age)	Height	App.	Goals	Club
3	LB	Aljoša Škaper (M)	27 December 1985 (age 39)	1.97 m	4	10
5	LB	Milan Slapničar (M)	5 August 1988 (age 36)	1.83 m	0	0
7	RW	Tanja Cerkvenik (W)	17 May 1976 (age 49)	1.68 m	0	0
10	CB	Jovita Jeglič (W)	31 January 1970 (age 55)	1.66 m	0	0
13	CB	Klemen Lokar (M)	18 October 1984 (age 40)	1.75 m	1	0
23	P	Anton Zakrajšek (M)	11 December 1976 (age 48)	1.76 m	4	2
33	LW	Matej Arh (M)	11 December 1993 (age 31)	1.85 m	0	0
66	P	Nenad Stojaković (M)	11 August 1966 (age 58)	1.90 m	4	6
77	RB	David Škorjanc (M)	22 November 1999 (age 25)	1.85 m	0	0
		Average	age 39.6	1.81 m	1.4	2.0

== Website ==
Official website
