= 2016 European Wheelchair Handball Nations' Tournament =

2016 European Wheelchair Handball Nations’ Tournament
Tournament details
- Host country: Sweden
- City: Sölvesborg
- Venue(s): 1 (in 1 host city)
- Dates: 7–8 December
- Teams: 4 (from EHF confederations)

Final positions
- Champions: Netherlands (2nd title)
- Runner-up: Portugal
- Third place: Sweden
- Fourth place: Italy

Tournament statistics
- Matches played: 8
- Goals scored: 233 (29.13 per match)
- Top scorer(s): Iderlindo Gomes (POR) (22 goals)

Awards
- Best player: 5 players
- Best goalkeeper: Joyce Van Haaster (NED)

The 2016 EHF European Wheelchair Handball Nations’ Tournament was the 2nd edition and was hosted for the first time in Sweden from 7 to 8 December 2016.

== Venues ==
Sölvesborg	2016 European Wheelchair Handball Nations' Tournament is located in Sweden
Valjeviken	2016 European Wheelchair Handball Nations' Tournament is located in Sweden

== Match officials ==
Country	Referees
Austria	Mirsad Begovic; Vladimir Bubalo
France	Marc De Sousa; Christophe Dewaele

== Preliminary round ==
All times are local (UTC+1)

Pos	Team	Pld	W	D	L	GF	GA	GD	Pts	Qualification
1	Netherlands	3	2	1	0	73	26	+47	5	Final
2	Portugal	3	2	1	0	62	30	+32	5	Final
3	Italy	3	1	0	2	22	69	−47	2	Third place game
4	Sweden (H)	3	0	0	3	27	59	−32	0	Third place game

Source: EHF
Rules for classification: 1) points; 2) points in the games between teams in question; 3) goal difference in the games between teams in question; 4) number of goals scored in the games between teams in question; 5) goal difference; 6) number of goals scored.
(H) Hosts

7 December 2016; 14:00	Netherlands	26–7	Sweden	Valjeviken, Sölvesborg; Referees: De Sousa, Dewaele (FRA)
7 December 2016; 14:00	Nkomezi 7	(12-2)	Almers & Solagh Hamadi 3	Valjeviken, Sölvesborg; Referees: De Sousa, Dewaele (FRA)
7 December 2016; 14:00	2× (yellow card)	Report	1× (yellow card) 2× (suspension)	Valjeviken, Sölvesborg; Referees: De Sousa, Dewaele (FRA)

7 December 2016; 15:00	Portugal	26–6	Italy	Valjeviken, Sölvesborg; Referees: Begovic, Bubalo (AUT)
7 December 2016; 15:00	Gomes 8	(13-3)	Castellani & Cagiola 2	Valjeviken, Sölvesborg; Referees: Begovic, Bubalo (AUT)
7 December 2016; 15:00	1× (yellow card) 2× (suspension)	Report	3× (yellow card) 2× (suspension) 1× (red card)	Valjeviken, Sölvesborg; Referees: Begovic, Bubalo (AUT)

7 December 2016; 17:00	Italy	4–32	Netherlands	Valjeviken, Sölvesborg; Referees: De Sousa, Dewaele (FRA)
7 December 2016; 17:00	Castellani 2	(3-13)	Hooning & Dokkum 5	Valjeviken, Sölvesborg; Referees: De Sousa, Dewaele (FRA)
7 December 2016; 17:00	2× (yellow card) 1× (suspension)	Report	3× (yellow card) 1× (suspension)	Valjeviken, Sölvesborg; Referees: De Sousa, Dewaele (FRA)

7 December 2016; 18:00	Sweden	9–21	Portugal	Valjeviken, Sölvesborg; Referees: Begovic, Bubalo (AUT)
7 December 2016; 18:00	Almers 3	(5-8)	Rumor & Jeronimo 5	Valjeviken, Sölvesborg; Referees: Begovic, Bubalo (AUT)
7 December 2016; 18:00	2× (yellow card)	Report		Valjeviken, Sölvesborg; Referees: Begovic, Bubalo (AUT)

8 December 2016; 10:00	Netherlands	15–15	Portugal	Valjeviken, Sölvesborg; Referees: De Sousa, Dewaele (FRA)
8 December 2016; 10:00	Hooning 5	(7-6)	Jeronimo 8	Valjeviken, Sölvesborg; Referees: De Sousa, Dewaele (FRA)
8 December 2016; 10:00	2× (yellow card)	Report	3× (yellow card) 1× (suspension)	Valjeviken, Sölvesborg; Referees: De Sousa, Dewaele (FRA)

8 December 2016; 11:00	Sweden	11–12	Italy	Valjeviken, Sölvesborg; Referees: Begovic, Bubalo (AUT)
8 December 2016; 11:00	Solagh Hamadi 4	(5-4)	Cagiola 10	Valjeviken, Sölvesborg; Referees: Begovic, Bubalo (AUT)
8 December 2016; 11:00	1× (yellow card)	Report	1× (yellow card) 2× (suspension)	Valjeviken, Sölvesborg; Referees: Begovic, Bubalo (AUT)

== Knockout stage ==
=== Third place game ===
8 December 2016; 14:00	Italy	7–13	Sweden	Valjeviken, Sölvesborg; Referees: De Sousa, Dewaele (FRA)
8 December 2016; 14:00	3 players 2	(5-5)	Johannesen & Solagh Hamadi 4	Valjeviken, Sölvesborg; Referees: De Sousa, Dewaele (FRA)
8 December 2016; 14:00	3× (yellow card)	Report	1× (yellow card) 1× (suspension)	Valjeviken, Sölvesborg; Referees: De Sousa, Dewaele (FRA)

=== Final ===
8 December 2016; 15:00	Netherlands	19–10	Portugal	Valjeviken, Sölvesborg; Referees: Begovic, Bubalo (AUT)
8 December 2016; 15:00	Neeft 5	(9-2)	Gomes 5	Valjeviken, Sölvesborg; Referees: Begovic, Bubalo (AUT)
8 December 2016; 15:00	1× (suspension)	Report	2× (yellow card) 3× (suspension)	Valjeviken, Sölvesborg; Referees: Begovic, Bubalo (AUT)

== Ranking and statistics ==
=== Final ranking ===
Rank	Team
1st place, gold medalist(s)	Netherlands
2nd place, silver medalist(s)	Portugal
3rd place, bronze medalist(s)	Sweden
4	Italy

=== All-Star Team ===
The all-star team and awards were announced on 8 December 2016.

Position	Player
Most Valuable Player 1	Joao Jeronimo (POR)
Most Valuable Player 2	Massimo Cagiola (ITA)
Most Valuable Player 3	Julia Johansson (SWE)
Most Valuable Player 4	Yves Nkomezi (NED)
Most Valuable Player 5	Mayenka De Bruin (NED)

=== Awards ===
Award	Player
Best Goalkeeper	Joyce Van Haaster (NED)
Topscorer	Iderlindo Gomes (POR) (22 goals)

=== Top goalscorers ===
Rank	Name	Team	Goals
1	Iderlindo Gomes	Portugal	22
2	Joao Jeronimo	Portugal	19
3	Massimo Cagiola	Italy	15
3	Yves Nkomezi	Netherlands	15
5	Bart Neeft	Netherlands	14
6	Martijn Dokkum	Netherlands	13
6	Frank Hooning	Netherlands	13
8	Kevin Johannessen	Sweden	11
8	Serghei Mitrofan	Portugal	11
10	Robert Appelman	Netherlands	10
10	Ahmed Solagh Hamadi	Sweden	10
