= Écully =

Écully Èculyé (Arpitan)
- Commune
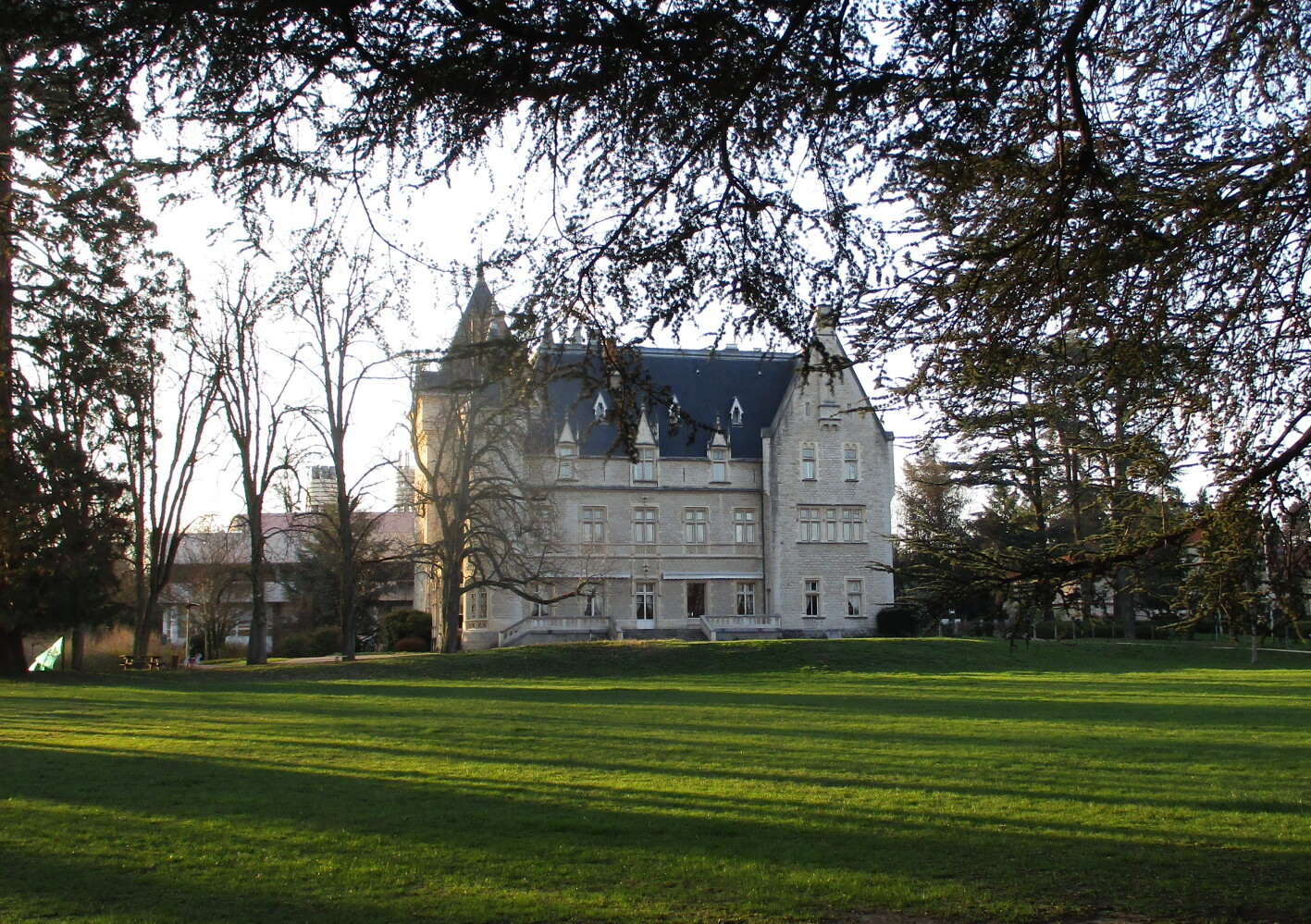
- The Château du Vivier in Écully

- Coat of arms
- Location of Écully
- Location within France Location within Auvergne-Rhône-Alpes
- Coordinates: 45°46′31″N 4°46′42″E
- Country: France
- Region: Auvergne-Rhône-Alpes
- Metropolis: Lyon Metropolis
- Arrondissement: Lyon

Government
  - Mayor (2026–32): Sébastien Michel (DVD)
- Area^{1}: 8.45 km^{2} (3.26 sq mi)
- Elevation: 211 m (692 ft)
- Highest elevation: 305 m (1,001 ft)
- Lowest elevation: 180 m (590 ft)
- Population (2023): 17,944
  - Density: 2,120/km^{2} (5,500/sq mi)
- Demonym: Écullois
- Time zone: UTC+01:00 (CET)
  - Summer (DST): UTC+02:00 (CEST)
- INSEE/Postal code: 69081 /69130
- Website: www.ecully.fr
- ^{1} French Land Register data, which excludes lakes, ponds, glaciers > 1 km^{2} (0.386 sq mi or 247 acres) and river estuaries.

Écully (French pronunciation: [ekyli]) is a suburban commune in the Metropolis of Lyon in the Auvergne-Rhône-Alpes region, central-eastern France. It is a northwestern suburb of Lyon, bordering its 9th arrondissement.

== Geography ==
Écully is 6 km (4 miles) from Lyons city centre. It offers a privileged lifestyle in the relative countryside just a few minutes from the centre of the second-largest metropolitan area in France.

=== Transport ===
The city is served by the Transports en commun lyonnais (TCL).

== Name ==
Écully was originally covered with a forest of oaks "Aesculus" in Latin, the name changed over the millennia into Esculiacus, Excolliacus, Escullieu, Escully, Ecuilly, and finally, Écully.

== History ==
The circumstances and date of foundation of the city are lost in the mists of time. The site has been settled by humans since the Stone Age, burial pits as well as several polished stone axes, pottery debris, and a hollowed out stone in the form of a basin or mortar were found in 1860 during excavations.

In the early days of the Roman Empire the development of the Roman colony and capital of Gaul Lugdunum (which later became the city of Lyon) required the construction of major roads leading to other cities in Gaul. Built by Marcus Vipsanius Agrippa (son-in-law, and lieutenant to the first Roman emperor Augustus) two of these roads pass through Écully. The Roman colony also needed a massive water supply. The aqueducts that brought it from the Mont d'Or and the Brevenne river, crossed Écully.

The name of the town appears for the first time in 980 AD in a document of a cartulary of the Savigny Abbey.

Écully benefited from the economic development of Lyon. Rich merchants, aldermen, and notables bought the land and built beautiful houses, attracted in particular by a favorable tax system, obtained in 1485 and confirmed by Henri IV in 1594: the exemption from the taille direct land tax. Some of the city's oldest remaining families settled in the city during this time.

== Population ==
Historical population
Year	Pop.	±% p.a.
1968	10,077	—
1975	17,944	+8.59%
1982	17,865	−0.06%
1990	18,360	+0.34%
1999	18,011	−0.21%
2007	17,959	−0.04%
2012	17,742	−0.24%
2017	18,517	+0.86%
2023	17,944	−0.52%
Source: INSEE

== Administration ==
The municipal council is composed of 33 members elected for a six-year term. The mayor is elected by the councillors.

== Leading institutions of higher education ==
It is the location of the Paul Bocuse Institute, which is partially situated inside the Château du Vivier. It is also the location of many higher education institutions, including École centrale de Lyon and French National Forensic Institute.

== Health ==
Écully has two clinics: the Val d'Ouest and Mon repos.

== Sports ==
The city has a municipal swimming pool, several gyms, a bowling alley, a multipurpose room, a tennis court, a football and a rugby field.

== Businesses ==
The city is the seat of the Groupe SEB (the world leader in small appliance).

== People ==
The botanist Antoine Cariot (1820–1883) was born in Écully.

Alexis Jandard, a springboard athlete, was also born there in 1997.
