= 2019 European Wheelchair Handball Nations' Tournament =

Tournament details
- Host country: Croatia
- City: Zagreb
- Venue(s): 1 (in 1 host city)
- Dates: 14 – 15 December
- Teams: 6 (from EHF confederations)

Final positions
- Champions: Croatia
- Runner-up: Portugal
- Third place: Hungary
- Fourth place: Netherlands

Tournament statistics
- Matches played: 11
- Attendance: 1,560 (142 per match)

The 2019 EHF European Wheelchair Handball Nations' Tournament was the 4th edition and was hosted for the first time in Croatia from 14 to 15 December 2019. This was the last European Wheelchair Handball Nations' Tournament because next year will be held an official European championship. Croatia defeated Portugal to the first title.

== Venues ==
Zagreb	2019 European Wheelchair Handball Nations' Tournament is located in Croatia
Sutinska Vrela Hall; Capacity: 2,000	2019 European Wheelchair Handball Nations' Tournament is located in Croatia

== Match officials ==
Country	Referees
Austria	Mirsad Begovic; Vladimir Bubalo
Croatia	Igor Hunjadi; Marijo Zecevic
Portugal	Nelson Santos; Ricardo Caçador

== Draw ==
The draw was held at the EHF headquarters in Vienna on 26 November 2019. Spain was first planned as the sixth team but they withdrew from the tournament and Slovenia replaced them

=== Seeding ===
Croatia was allowed as host to pick their group.

Pot 1	Pot 2	Pot 3
Croatia; Portugal	Hungary; Netherlands	Romania; Slovenia

== Preliminary round ==
All times are local (UTC+1)

=== Group A ===
Pos	Team	Pld	W	D	L	GF	GA	GD	Pts	Qualification
1	Croatia (H)	2	2	0	0	29	11	+18	4	Semi Final
2	Hungary	2	1	0	1	18	17	+1	2	Semi Final
3	Romania	2	0	0	2	14	33	−19	0	Fifth place games

Source: EHF
Rules for classification: 1) points; 2) points in the games between teams in question; 3) goal difference in the games between teams in question; 4) number of goals scored in the games between teams in question; 5) goal difference; 6) number of goals scored.
(H) Hosts

14 December 2019; 10:00	Romania	8-18	Croatia	Sutinska Vrela Hall, Zagreb; Attendance: 50; Referees: Caçador & Santos (PRT)
14 December 2019; 10:00	Punga & Trandafir (3)	(3-10)	Stimac (9)	Sutinska Vrela Hall, Zagreb; Attendance: 50; Referees: Caçador & Santos (PRT)
14 December 2019; 10:00	2× (yellow card)	Report	1× (suspension)	Sutinska Vrela Hall, Zagreb; Attendance: 50; Referees: Caçador & Santos (PRT)

14 December 2019; 12:30	Hungary	15-6	Romania	Sutinska Vrela Hall, Zagreb; Attendance: 200; Referees: Begovic & Bubalo (AUT)
14 December 2019; 12:30	Tomolya (7)	(9-3)	Punga (3)	Sutinska Vrela Hall, Zagreb; Attendance: 200; Referees: Begovic & Bubalo (AUT)
14 December 2019; 12:30	2× (yellow card) 2× (suspension)	Report	1× (suspension)	Sutinska Vrela Hall, Zagreb; Attendance: 200; Referees: Begovic & Bubalo (AUT)

14 December 2019; 14:30	Croatia	11-3	Hungary	Sutinska Vrela Hall, Zagreb; Attendance: 80; Referees: Caçador & Santo (PRT)
14 December 2019; 14:30	Stimac (7)	(5-0)	Tapai, Szilagyi & Szabo (1)	Sutinska Vrela Hall, Zagreb; Attendance: 80; Referees: Caçador & Santo (PRT)
14 December 2019; 14:30	1× (yellow card) 1× (suspension)	Report	1× (yellow card) 2× (suspension)	Sutinska Vrela Hall, Zagreb; Attendance: 80; Referees: Caçador & Santo (PRT)

=== Group B ===
Pos	Team	Pld	W	D	L	GF	GA	GD	Pts	Qualification
1	Portugal	2	2	0	0	27	8	+19	4	Semi Final
2	Netherlands	2	1	0	1	21	16	+5	2	Semi Final
3	Slovenia	2	0	0	2	7	31	−24	0	Fifth place games

Source: EHF
Rules for classification: 1) points; 2) points in the games between teams in question; 3) goal difference in the games between teams in question; 4) number of goals scored in the games between teams in question; 5) goal difference; 6) number of goals scored.

14 December 2019; 11:30	Slovenia	2-16	Portugal	Sutinska Vrela Hall, Zagreb; Attendance: 200; Referees: Hunjadi & Zecevic (CRO)
14 December 2019; 11:30	Stojakovic & Skaper (1)	(1-10)	Gomes (5)	Sutinska Vrela Hall, Zagreb; Attendance: 200; Referees: Hunjadi & Zecevic (CRO)
14 December 2019; 11:30	1× (yellow card)	Report	1× (yellow card)	Sutinska Vrela Hall, Zagreb; Attendance: 200; Referees: Hunjadi & Zecevic (CRO)

14 December 2019; 13:30	Netherlands	15-5	Slovenia	Sutinska Vrela Hall, Zagreb; Attendance: 80; Referees: Hunjadi & Zecevic (CRO)
14 December 2019; 13:30	van den Ende (7)	(9-2)	Music & Skaper (2)	Sutinska Vrela Hall, Zagreb; Attendance: 80; Referees: Hunjadi & Zecevic (CRO)
14 December 2019; 13:30	2× (yellow card)	Report		Sutinska Vrela Hall, Zagreb; Attendance: 80; Referees: Hunjadi & Zecevic (CRO)

14 December 2019; 15:30	Portugal	11-6	Netherlands	Sutinska Vrela Hall, Zagreb; Attendance: 200; Referees: Begovic & Bubalo (AUT)
14 December 2019; 15:30	Gomes (4)	(7-2)	van den Ende (4)	Sutinska Vrela Hall, Zagreb; Attendance: 200; Referees: Begovic & Bubalo (AUT)
14 December 2019; 15:30	1× (yellow card) 3× (suspension)	Report	1× (yellow card) 1× (suspension)	Sutinska Vrela Hall, Zagreb; Attendance: 200; Referees: Begovic & Bubalo (AUT)

== Fifth place games ==
Pos	Team	Pld	W	D	L	GF	GA	GD	Pts	Qualification
1	Romania	2	1	0	1	25	18	+7	2	Fifth place
2	Slovenia	2	1	0	1	18	25	−7	2	Sixth place

Source: EHF
Rules for classification: 1) points; 2) goal difference; 3) number of goals scored.

15 December 2019; 9:00	Romania	15-18	Slovenia	Sutinska Vrela Hall, Zagreb; Attendance: 100; Referees: Begovic & Bubalo (AUT)
15 December 2019; 9:00	Tandafir & Daniel Mititelu (4)	(5-10)	Music (9)	Sutinska Vrela Hall, Zagreb; Attendance: 100; Referees: Begovic & Bubalo (AUT)
15 December 2019; 9:00		Report	1× (yellow card) 3× (suspension)	Sutinska Vrela Hall, Zagreb; Attendance: 100; Referees: Begovic & Bubalo (AUT)

15 December 2019; 13:00	Slovenia	0-10	Romania	Sutinska Vrela Hall, Zagreb
15 December 2019; 13:00		(Forfeit)		Sutinska Vrela Hall, Zagreb
15 December 2019; 13:00		Report		Sutinska Vrela Hall, Zagreb

== Knockout stage ==
Semifinals
A1	Croatia	11
B2	Netherlands	7
A2	Hungary	2
B1	Portugal	13

Final
A1	Croatia	9
B1	Portugal	8
Small Final
B2	Netherlands	3
A2	Hungary	6

=== Semifinals ===
15 December 2019; 11:00	Croatia	11-7	Netherlands	Sutinska Vrela Hall, Zagreb; Attendance: 150; Referees: Caçador & Santo (PRT)
15 December 2019; 11:00	Demirovic (6)	(4-4)	Dokkum (4)	Sutinska Vrela Hall, Zagreb; Attendance: 150; Referees: Caçador & Santo (PRT)
15 December 2019; 11:00	3× (yellow card)	Report	2× (yellow card) 2× (suspension)	Sutinska Vrela Hall, Zagreb; Attendance: 150; Referees: Caçador & Santo (PRT)

15 December 2019; 12:00	Hungary	2-13	Portugal	Sutinska Vrela Hall, Zagreb; Attendance: 150; Referees: Hunjadi & Zecevic (CRO)
15 December 2019; 12:00	Weisz & Jancsao (1)	(1-9)	Queiros (7)	Sutinska Vrela Hall, Zagreb; Attendance: 150; Referees: Hunjadi & Zecevic (CRO)
15 December 2019; 12:00	1× (yellow card)	Report	1× (yellow card)	Sutinska Vrela Hall, Zagreb; Attendance: 150; Referees: Hunjadi & Zecevic (CRO)

=== Third place game ===
15 December 2019; 14:00	Netherlands	3-6	Hungary	Sutinska Vrela Hall, Zagreb; Attendance: 150; Referees: Caçador & Santo (PRT)
15 December 2019; 14:00	Dokkum (2)	(1-3)	Tomolya (4)	Sutinska Vrela Hall, Zagreb; Attendance: 150; Referees: Caçador & Santo (PRT)
15 December 2019; 14:00	1× (yellow card)	Report	1× (yellow card) 1× (suspension)	Sutinska Vrela Hall, Zagreb; Attendance: 150; Referees: Caçador & Santo (PRT)

=== Final ===
15 December 2019; 15:00	Croatia	9-8	Portugal	Sutinska Vrela Hall, Zagreb; Attendance: 200; Referees: Begovic & Bubalo (AUT)
15 December 2019; 15:00	Demirovic & Stimac (4)	(3-4)	Queiros (6)	Sutinska Vrela Hall, Zagreb; Attendance: 200; Referees: Begovic & Bubalo (AUT)
15 December 2019; 15:00	1× (yellow card) 2× (suspension)	Report	2× (yellow card) 2× (suspension) 1× (red card)	Sutinska Vrela Hall, Zagreb; Attendance: 200; Referees: Begovic & Bubalo (AUT)

== Ranking and statistics ==
=== Final ranking ===
Rank	Team
1st place, gold medalist(s)	Croatia
2nd place, silver medalist(s)	Portugal
3rd place, bronze medalist(s)	Hungary
4	Netherlands
5	Romania
6	Slovenia
