= 2018 European Wheelchair Handball Nations' Tournament =

2018 European Wheelchair Handball Nations’ Tournament
Tournament details
- Host country: Portugal
- City: Leiria
- Venue(s): 1 (in 1 host city)
- Dates: 1 – 2 December
- Teams: 4 (from EHF confederations)

Final positions
- Champions: Portugal (1st title)
- Runner-up: Croatia
- Third place: Netherlands
- Fourth place: Hungary

Tournament statistics
- Matches played: 8
- Goals scored: 188 (23.5 per match)
- Attendance: 1,120 (140 per match)
- Top scorer(s): (Croatia) Ademir Demirovic (26 goals)

Awards
- Best player: Ricardo Queiros (POR)
- Best goalkeeper: Joyce Van Haaster (NED)

The 2018 EHF European Wheelchair Handball Nations’ Tournament was the 3rd edition and was hosted for the first time in Portugal from 1 to 2 December 2018.

== Venues ==
Leiria	2018 European Wheelchair Handball Nations' Tournament is located in Portugal
Pavilhao Leiria	2018 European Wheelchair Handball Nations' Tournament is located in Portugal

== Match officials ==
Country	Referees
Austria	Mirsad Begovic; Vladimir Bubalo
Portugal	Nelson Santos; Ricardo Caçador

== Preliminary round ==
All times are local (UTC+0)

Pos	Team	Pld	W	D	L	GF	GA	GD	Pts	Qualification
1	Portugal (H)	3	3	0	0	44	27	+17	6	Final
2	Croatia	3	2	0	1	49	38	+11	4	Final
3	Netherlands	3	1	0	2	34	34	0	2	Third place game
4	Hungary	3	0	0	3	16	44	−28	0	Third place game

Source: EHF
Rules for classification: 1) points; 2) points in the games between teams in question; 3) goal difference in the games between teams in question; 4) number of goals scored in the games between teams in question; 5) goal difference; 6) number of goals scored.
(H) Hosts

1 December 2018; 10:30	Portugal	12-9	Netherlands	Pavilhao Leiria, Leiria; Attendance: 100; Referees: Begovic, Bubalo (AUT)
1 December 2018; 10:30	Pedro (5)	(7-4)	van den Ende (4)	Pavilhao Leiria, Leiria; Attendance: 100; Referees: Begovic, Bubalo (AUT)
1 December 2018; 10:30	2× (yellow card) 1× (suspension)	Report	1× (yellow card) 1× (suspension)	Pavilhao Leiria, Leiria; Attendance: 100; Referees: Begovic, Bubalo (AUT)

1 December 2018; 12:00	Hungary	6-19	Croatia	Pavilhao Leiria, Leiria; Attendance: 50; Referees: Santos, Caçador (PRT)
1 December 2018; 12:00	Palkovits (3)	(3-9)	Stimac (8)	Pavilhao Leiria, Leiria; Attendance: 50; Referees: Santos, Caçador (PRT)
1 December 2018; 12:00	1× (suspension)	Report	2× (yellow card)	Pavilhao Leiria, Leiria; Attendance: 50; Referees: Santos, Caçador (PRT)

1 December 2018; 17:00	Netherlands	11-7	Hungary	Pavilhao Leiria, Leiria; Attendance: 80; Referees: Santos, Caçador (PRT)
1 December 2018; 17:00	Neeft (4)	(6-1)	Tapai & Tomolya (2)	Pavilhao Leiria, Leiria; Attendance: 80; Referees: Santos, Caçador (PRT)
1 December 2018; 17:00		Report	1× (yellow card)	Pavilhao Leiria, Leiria; Attendance: 80; Referees: Santos, Caçador (PRT)

1 December 2018; 18:30	Croatia	15-18	Portugal	Pavilhao Leiria, Leiria; Attendance: 150; Referees: Begovic, Bubalo (AUT)
1 December 2018; 18:30	Demirovic (9)	(6-10)	Queiros (10)	Pavilhao Leiria, Leiria; Attendance: 150; Referees: Begovic, Bubalo (AUT)
1 December 2018; 18:30	1× (yellow card) 1× (red card)	Report	1× (yellow card) 5× (suspension)	Pavilhao Leiria, Leiria; Attendance: 150; Referees: Begovic, Bubalo (AUT)

2 December 2018; 10:00	Portugal	14-3	Hungary	Pavilhao Leiria, Leiria; Attendance: 120; Referees: Begovic, Bubalo (AUT)
2 December 2018; 10:00	Mitrofan (5)	(8-1)	3 players (1)	Pavilhao Leiria, Leiria; Attendance: 120; Referees: Begovic, Bubalo (AUT)
2 December 2018; 10:00	2× (yellow card)	Report	1× (suspension)	Pavilhao Leiria, Leiria; Attendance: 120; Referees: Begovic, Bubalo (AUT)

2 December 2018; 11:30	Netherlands	14-15	Croatia	Pavilhao Leiria, Leiria; Attendance: 100; Referees: Santos, Caçador (PRT)
2 December 2018; 11:30	Dokkum (7)	(7-8)	Demirovic (6)	Pavilhao Leiria, Leiria; Attendance: 100; Referees: Santos, Caçador (PRT)
2 December 2018; 11:30	2× (yellow card) 2× (suspension)	Report	3× (yellow card) 1× (suspension)	Pavilhao Leiria, Leiria; Attendance: 100; Referees: Santos, Caçador (PRT)

== Knockout stage ==
=== Third place game ===
2 December 2018; 15:30	Netherlands	13-5	Hungary	Pavilhao Leiria, Leiria; Attendance: 170; Referees: Santos, Caçador (PRT)
2 December 2018; 15:30	Neeft (4)	(9-1)	Lengyel (4)	Pavilhao Leiria, Leiria; Attendance: 170; Referees: Santos, Caçador (PRT)
2 December 2018; 15:30	2× (yellow card)	Report	2× (yellow card)	Pavilhao Leiria, Leiria; Attendance: 170; Referees: Santos, Caçador (PRT)

=== Final ===
2 December 2018; 17:00	Portugal	20-7	Croatia	Pavilhao Leiria, Leiria; Attendance: 350; Referees: Begovic, Bubalo (AUT)
2 December 2018; 17:00	Gomes (7)	(10-2)	Demirovic (5)	Pavilhao Leiria, Leiria; Attendance: 350; Referees: Begovic, Bubalo (AUT)
2 December 2018; 17:00	1× (yellow card) 2× (suspension)	Report		Pavilhao Leiria, Leiria; Attendance: 350; Referees: Begovic, Bubalo (AUT)

== Ranking and statistics ==
=== Final ranking ===
Rank	Team
1st place, gold medalist(s)	Portugal
2nd place, silver medalist(s)	Croatia
3rd place, bronze medalist(s)	Netherlands
4	Hungary

=== Awards ===
Award	Player
Most Valuable Player	Ricardo Queirós (POR)
Best Goalkeeper	Joyce Van Haaster (NED)
Topscorer	Ademir Demirovic (CRO) (26 goals)

=== Top goalscorers ===
Rank	Name	Team	Goals
1	Ademir Demirovic	Croatia	26
2	Ricardo Queirós	Portugal	16
2	Ante Stimac	Croatia	16
4	Iderlindo Gomes	Portugal	14
5	Martijn Dokkum	Netherlands	13
6	Bart Neeft	Netherlands	12
7	João Jerónimo	Portugal	9
7	João Pedro	Portugal	9
7	Ante Rubesa	Croatia	9
10	Serghei Mitrofan	Portugal	8
