= 2015 European Wheelchair Handball Nations' Tournament =

2015 European Wheelchair Handball Nations’ Tournament
Tournament details
- Host country: Austria
- City: St. Pölten
- Venue: 1 (in 1 host city)
- Dates: 12–13 December
- Teams: 4 (from EHF confederations)

Final positions
- Champions: Netherlands (2nd title)
- Runners-up: Portugal
- Third place: Norway
- Fourth place: Sweden

Tournament statistics
- Matches played: 8
- Goals scored: 209 (26.13 per match)
- Top scorer(s): Serghei Mitrofan (POR) (17 goals)

The 2015 EHF European Wheelchair Handball Nations’ Tournament was the first edition and was hosted for the first time in Austria from 12 to 13 December 2015.

== Venues ==
St. Pölten	2015 European Wheelchair Handball Nations' Tournament is located in Austria
Sportzentrum NÖ	2015 European Wheelchair Handball Nations' Tournament is located in Austria

== Match officials ==
Country	Referees
Austria	Mirsad Begovic; Vladimir Bubalo
France	Marc De Sousa; Christophe Dewaele

== Preliminary round ==
All times are local (UTC+1)

Pos	Team	Pld	W	D	L	GF	GA	GD	Pts	Qualification
1	Netherlands	3	3	0	0	44	25	+19	6	Final
2	Portugal	3	2	0	1	58	29	+29	4	Final
3	Sweden	3	1	0	2	34	55	−21	2	Third place game
4	Norway	3	0	0	3	21	48	−27	0	Third place game

Source: EHF
Rules for classification: 1) points; 2) points in the games between teams in question; 3) goal difference in the games between teams in question; 4) number of goals scored in the games between teams in question; 5) goal difference; 6) number of goals scored.

12 December 2015; 14:00	Norway	3–11	Netherlands	Sportzentrum NÖ, St. Pölten; Referees: De Sousa, Dewaele (FRA)
12 December 2015; 14:00	3 players 1	(0-4)	De Bruin 3	Sportzentrum NÖ, St. Pölten; Referees: De Sousa, Dewaele (FRA)
12 December 2015; 14:00		Report		Sportzentrum NÖ, St. Pölten; Referees: De Sousa, Dewaele (FRA)

12 December 2015; 15:00	Portugal	25–8	Sweden	Sportzentrum NÖ, St. Pölten; Referees: Begovic, Bubalo (AUT)
12 December 2015; 15:00	Mitrofan 9	(13-4)	3 players 2	Sportzentrum NÖ, St. Pölten; Referees: Begovic, Bubalo (AUT)
12 December 2015; 15:00		Report		Sportzentrum NÖ, St. Pölten; Referees: Begovic, Bubalo (AUT)

12 December 2015; 17:00	Sweden	18–15	Norway	Sportzentrum NÖ, St. Pölten; Referees: Begovic, Bubalo (AUT)
12 December 2015; 17:00	Johansson 6	(9-7)	Synnove 6	Sportzentrum NÖ, St. Pölten; Referees: Begovic, Bubalo (AUT)
12 December 2015; 17:00	2× (yellow card) 2× (suspension)	Report	2× (suspension)	Sportzentrum NÖ, St. Pölten; Referees: Begovic, Bubalo (AUT)

12 December 2015; 18:00	Netherlands	18–14	Portugal	Sportzentrum NÖ, St. Pölten; Referees: De Sousa, Dewaele (FRA)
12 December 2015; 18:00	De Graaf 6	(8-3)	Nogueira 8	Sportzentrum NÖ, St. Pölten; Referees: De Sousa, Dewaele (FRA)
12 December 2015; 18:00	1× (yellow card) 2× (suspension)	Report	2× (yellow card) 1× (suspension)	Sportzentrum NÖ, St. Pölten; Referees: De Sousa, Dewaele (FRA)

13 December 2015; 10:00	Norway	3–19	Portugal	Sportzentrum NÖ, St. Pölten; Referees: Begovic, Bubalo (AUT)
13 December 2015; 10:00	Synnove 2	(1-9)	Farroba 7	Sportzentrum NÖ, St. Pölten; Referees: Begovic, Bubalo (AUT)
13 December 2015; 10:00		Report	1× (yellow card)	Sportzentrum NÖ, St. Pölten; Referees: Begovic, Bubalo (AUT)

13 December 2015; 11:00	Netherlands	15–8	Sweden	Sportzentrum NÖ, St. Pölten; Referees: De Sousa, Dewaele (FRA)
13 December 2015; 11:00	4 players 3	(9-2)	Johannessen & Sundahl 2	Sportzentrum NÖ, St. Pölten; Referees: De Sousa, Dewaele (FRA)
13 December 2015; 11:00	2× (yellow card)	Report	1× (yellow card) 1× (suspension)	Sportzentrum NÖ, St. Pölten; Referees: De Sousa, Dewaele (FRA)

== Knockout stage ==
=== Third place game ===
13 December 2015; 14:00	Sweden	12–15	Norway	Sportzentrum NÖ, St. Pölten; Referees: Begovic, Bubalo (AUT)
13 December 2015; 14:00	Carlsson 5	(4-5)	Funkquist 5	Sportzentrum NÖ, St. Pölten; Referees: Begovic, Bubalo (AUT)
13 December 2015; 14:00	1× (yellow card) 1× (suspension)	Report	1× (yellow card) 1× (suspension)	Sportzentrum NÖ, St. Pölten; Referees: Begovic, Bubalo (AUT)

=== Final ===
13 December 2015; 15:00	Netherlands	14–11	Portugal	Sportzentrum NÖ, St. Pölten; Referees: De Sousa, Dewaele (FRA)
13 December 2015; 15:00	Neeft & Hooning 4	(6-6)	Jeronimo & Serghei Mitrofan 4	Sportzentrum NÖ, St. Pölten; Referees: De Sousa, Dewaele (FRA)
13 December 2015; 15:00	2× (yellow card) 1× (suspension)	Report	1× (yellow card) 1× (suspension)	Sportzentrum NÖ, St. Pölten; Referees: De Sousa, Dewaele (FRA)

== Ranking and statistics ==
=== Final ranking ===
Rank	Team
1st place, gold medalist(s)	Netherlands
2nd place, silver medalist(s)	Portugal
3rd place, bronze medalist(s)	Norway
4	Sweden

=== All-Star Team ===
Position	Player
Most Valuable Player 1	Julia Johansson (SWE)
Most Valuable Player 2	Joao Jeronimo (PRT)
Most Valuable Player 3	Martijn Dokkum (NED)
Most Valuable Player 4	Helder Farroba (PRT)
Most Valuable Player 5	Horgen Synnove (NOR)

=== Awards ===
Award	Player
Best Goalkeeper	Joyce Van Haaster (NED)
Topscorer	Serghei Mitrofan (POR) (17 goals)

=== Top goalscorers ===
Rank	Name	Team	Goals
1	Serghei Mitrofan	Portugal	17
2	Joao Jeronimo	Portugal	15
3	Dennis de Graaf	Netherlands	14
3	Helder Farroba	Portugal	14
3	Silvio Nogueira	Portugal	14
6	Frank Hooning	Netherlands	12
7	Bart Neeft	Netherlands	11
8	Synnove Horgen	Norway	10
8	Kevin Johannessen	Sweden	10
10	Martijn Dokkum	Netherlands	9
10	Peter Funkquist	Norway	9
10	Julia Johansson	Sweden	9
