= Portugal national wheelchair handball team =

Portugal

Information
- Association: Portuguese Handball Federation

Colours
1st	2nd

Results

World Championship
- Appearances: 1
- Best result: 1st (2022)

European Wheelchair Handball Nations' Tournament
- Appearances: 2 (First in 2015)
- Best result: (gold) Gold: 1st (2018),(2022),(2025)
- Last updated on 2025-02-03.

Portugal national wheelchair handball team
Medal record

World Wheelchair Handball Championship
Gold medal – first place	2022 Portugal	

European Wheelchair Handball Nations' Tournament
Gold medal – first place	2026 Lithuania	
Gold medal – first place	2022 Portugal	
Gold medal – first place	2018 Portugal	
Silver medal – second place	2015 Austria	
Silver medal – second place	2016 Sweden	
Silver medal – second place	2019 Croatia	

The Portugal national wheelchair handball team is the national wheelchair handball team of Portugal and is controlled by the Portuguese Handball Federation. The Portugal become at the only two editions of the European Wheelchair Handball Nations' Tournament second.

== Competitive record ==
=== European Wheelchair Handball Nations' Tournament ===
European Wheelchair Handball Nations' Tournament record
Year	Round	Position	GP	W	D	L	GS	GA	GD
2015 Austria	Runners-up	2nd of 4	4	2	0	2	69	43	+26
2016 Sweden	Runners-up	2nd of 4	4	2	1	1	72	49	+23
2018 Portugal	Champions	1st of 4	4	4	0	0	64	34	+30
2019 Croatia	Runners-up	2nd of 4	4	3	0	1	48	19	+29
2022 Portugal	Champions								
2025 Lithuania	Champions								
