= Wheelchair handball =

Paralympic variant of handball

- Pictogram
- Highest governing body: IHF
- First played: 2015

Characteristics
- Contact: Yes (frontal)
- Team members: 4 or 6 per side (including goalkeeper)
- Mixed-sex: Yes (minimum one female player)
- Type: Team sport, ball sport, Wheelchair sports
- Equipment: Handball, Wheelchair

Presence
- Country or region: Worldwide
- World Championships: IHF Wheelchair Handball World Championship

Wheelchair handball is handball played by people with varying physical disabilities that disqualify them from playing an able-bodied sport. These include spina bifida, birth defects, cerebral palsy, paralysis due to accident, amputations (of the legs, or other parts), and many other disabilities. The IHF Wheelchair Handball World Championship (IHF) is the governing body for this sport. It is recognized by the International Paralympic Committee (IPC) as the sole competent authority in wheelchair handball worldwide.

== History ==
During the Coaching Symposium 1993 in Leipzig Germany the first Wheelchair handball game was played. 12 years later during the IHF Symposium for Coaches and Referees in Bangkok Thailand and one year later 2006 at the EHF Youth Handball Convention in Vienna Austria Wheelchair handball was presented.

In October 2008 the EHF held the first seminar, in Vienna, Austria.

Since 2009 the IHF is a full member of the International Paralympic Committee.

In 2013 the first World Championship was held in and organized by Brazil, but not officially recognized by the IHF. Brazil won all categories.

In February and March 2019 the IHF Executive Committee discussed Wheelchair handball and sent letters to important bodies. In March the IHF Wheelchair Handball Working Group was established.

On 26 October 2019 the first Meeting of IHF Wheelchair Handball Working Group was held. They planned the first Wheelchair Handball World Championship for 2021 during the 2021 World Women's Handball Championship.

In January 2020 the IHF held the first seminar, in Basel, Switzerland.

During the IHF Council Meeting No. 6 on 27 and 28 February 2020 in Cairo the IHF announced that there will be the first IHF Wheelchair Handball World Championship already in 2020. The IHF will add Wheelchair handball for the 2028 Summer Paralympics. But one of the requirements is that there were two world championships until 2022. 24 nations across three continents had to play wheelchair handball. In 2023 the IPC Governing Board declined the application for 2028.

=== Europe ===
In 2005/06 people experimented with different variants of wheelchair handball with the Austrian Wheelchair basketball team "Sitting bulls".

In 2006, wheelchair handball was demonstrated to the different national federations.

In 2008 a Wheelchair handball tournament was held in Vienna.

Since 2015 four European Wheelchair Handball Nations' Tournaments were held.

In 2020 the first EHF Wheelchair Handball European Championship was planned but later was cancelled due to the COVID-19 pandemic. In 2021, a new attempt was planned.

=== South and Central America ===
In 1993 the University of Campinas played already Wheelchair handball but with no clear rules. In 2005 Wheelchair handball transformed to a competition sport in Brazil. In South and Central America Wheelchair handball was created in two forms, with 7 and 4 players. In 2009 the Brazilian Wheelchair Handball Association was created. In 2009 the first Wheelchair handball national game was played between Brazil and Chile. In 2020 the first South American Wheelchair Handball Championship was held. The Pan American Wheelchair Handball Championship was held in 2014 for the first time.

== Photo gallery ==
Yukio Moriya (森谷 幸生) of Knockü SC scores while Emanuel Lunde from Follo (guest player from Elverum) tries to block the shot during a tournament in Las Vegas, August 2026.

Yukio Moriya (森谷 幸生) passes the ball to Keita Murakami (村上 慶太) during a tournament in Las Vegas, August 2026.

Luis Francisco Gran tackles Shinnosuke Morooka (諸岡 晋之助) during a tournament in Las Vegas, August 2026.

Shinnosuke Morooka (諸岡 晋之助) passes the ball to Yukio Moriya (森谷 幸生) during a tournament in Las Vegas, August 2026.

== Geographic areas the sport is present ==
There are competitions in Europe (especially in the Netherlands), Brazil, and South American countries other than Brazil.

== Competitions ==
=== International ===
- IHF Wheelchair Handball World Championship (1 unofficial edition)
- Pan American Wheelchair Handball Championship (2 editions)
- South American Wheelchair Handball Championship (2 editions)
- European Wheelchair Handball Nations’ Tournament (4 editions)

=== National ===
- Brazilian Wheelchair Handball Championship (11 editions)
- Netherlands Wheelchair Handball Championship
- Japan Wheelchair Handball Championship (17 editions, since 200113:17)
- Pakistan Men’s National Wheelchair Handball Championship (1 edition)
- Italian National Wheelchair Handball Championship (1 edition)
- In 2005 in Nantes unofficial French Championship 13:17
- In 2006 in Liverpool13:17

== Differences to handball and additional rules ==
The rules are only for the six players variant. The four player variant is still in development.

Number of Players

Only six instead of seven players. Only mixed gender, one female player has to be on the court and minimum three female players have to be part of the roster.

If no female player is able to play (due to injuries or punishments) the team has to play with one player less.

Game time

A half is 20 minutes and the break 10 minutes. There is only one timeout per half.

Ball

All games are played with the ball size 2 and with no glue.

Goal

The goal is only 1.7 meters high instead of 2 meters, and the catch net has to be removed.

Playing Kit

The player's number had to be on the front. At the back of the wheelchair there has to be a sticker with the player's number in the color of their class.

- Class 1 = green
- Class 3 = blue
- Class 2 = yellow
- Class 4 = red

Straps

The legs have to be strapped to the wheelchair. Lifting of a player is punished with a 2-minute suspension. If the goalkeeper is lifting during defending there is additionally a 7 m throw.

Playing the Ball

It's allowed to place the ball maximum of 3 seconds on the lap. It's not allowed to steal the ball from the lap.

== Literature ==
- "IX. Rules of the Game c) Wheelchair Handball" (PDF). International Handball Federation. 27 February 2020. Archived (PDF) from the original on 29 June 2020.
- "IX. Rules of the Game d) Wheelchair Handball Four-a-Side" (PDF). International Handball Federation. 19 February 2021. Archived from the original on 10 May 2021.
