= Judo at the 2013 European Youth Summer Olympic Festival =

Judo competition

Judo Judo at the 2013 European Youth Summer Olympic Festival
- Location: Utrecht, Netherlands
- Dates: 13–20 July 2013

Competition at external databases
- Links: EJU • JudoInside

The Judo event at the 2013 European Youth Summer Olympic Festival was an edition of the judo competitions in the European Youth Olympic Festival. It was held in Utrecht, Netherlands from 13 to 20 July 2013.

== Medal summary ==
=== Medal table ===
* Host nation (Netherlands)

Rank	Nation	Gold	Silver	Bronze	Total
1	Russia (RUS)	4	0	2	6
2	Netherlands (NED)*	3	0	5	8
3	Georgia (GEO)	2	3	2	7
4	Turkey (TUR)	1	1	2	4
5	Hungary (HUN)	1	1	0	2
6	Azerbaijan (AZE)	1	0	1	2
6	Germany (GER)	1	0	1	2
8	France (FRA)	1	0	0	1
8	Poland (POL)	1	0	0	1
10	Romania (ROU)	0	2	1	3
11	Belgium (BEL)	0	1	1	2
11	Bosnia and Herzegovina (BIH)	0	1	1	2
11	Croatia (CRO)	0	1	1	2
11	Finland (FIN)	0	1	1	2
11	Great Britain (GBR)	0	1	1	2
11	Italy (ITA)	0	1	1	2
17	Belarus (BLR)	0	1	0	1
17	Bulgaria (BUL)	0	1	0	1
19	Slovenia (SLO)	0	0	3	3
19	Spain (ESP)	0	0	3	3
21	Austria (AUT)	0	0	1	1
21	Israel (ISR)	0	0	1	1
21	Montenegro (MNE)	0	0	1	1
21	Ukraine (UKR)	0	0	1	1
Totals (24 entries)		15	15	30	60

=== Men's events ===
Event	Gold	Silver	Bronze
−50 kg	Elnur Abbasov (AZE)	Jorre Verstraeten (BEL)	Oguzhan Karaca (TUR)
−50 kg	Elnur Abbasov (AZE)	Jorre Verstraeten (BEL)	Matthijs van Harten (NED)
−55 kg	Erekle Arkhozashvili (GEO)	Peter Miles (GBR)	Elios Manzi (ITA)
−55 kg	Erekle Arkhozashvili (GEO)	Peter Miles (GBR)	Tornike Tsjakadoea (NED)
−60 kg	Giorgi Katsiashvili (GEO)	Dzmitry Minkou (BLR)	Alberto Gaitero Martin (ESP)
−60 kg	Giorgi Katsiashvili (GEO)	Dzmitry Minkou (BLR)	Hidayat Heydarov (AZE)
−66 kg	Ismail Chasygov (RUS)	Petar Zadro (BIH)	Luka Harpf (SLO)
−66 kg	Ismail Chasygov (RUS)	Petar Zadro (BIH)	Simon Mamardashvili (GEO)
−73 kg	Islam Abanoz (TUR)	Tamazi Kirakozashvili (GEO)	Arso Milic (MNE)
−73 kg	Islam Abanoz (TUR)	Tamazi Kirakozashvili (GEO)	Oskar Tvauri (FIN)
−81 kg	Mikhail Igolnikov (RUS)	Leso Kvirikashvili (GEO)	Frank de Wit (NED)
−81 kg	Mikhail Igolnikov (RUS)	Leso Kvirikashvili (GEO)	Maximilian Schneider (AUT)
−90 kg	Sultan Abdullaev (RUS)	Martti Puumalainen (FIN)	John Jayne (GBR)
−90 kg	Sultan Abdullaev (RUS)	Martti Puumalainen (FIN)	Rok Polajzer (SLO)
+90 kg	Ruslan Shakhbazov (RUS)	Giorgi Dzebisashvili (GEO)	Fedir Panko (UKR)
+90 kg	Ruslan Shakhbazov (RUS)	Giorgi Dzebisashvili (GEO)	Jur Spijkers (NED)

=== Women's events ===
Event	Gold	Silver	Bronze
−44 kg	Amber Gersjes (NED)	Rabia Senyayla (TUR)	Camelia Ionita (ROU)
−44 kg	Amber Gersjes (NED)	Rabia Senyayla (TUR)	Sofya Matatova (RUS)
−48 kg	Réka Pupp (HUN)	Betina Temelkova (BUL)	Marta Gonzalez (ESP)
−48 kg	Réka Pupp (HUN)	Betina Temelkova (BUL)	Andreja Leški (SLO)
−52 kg	Gwenaelle Patin (FRA)	Theodora Balasoiu (ROU)	Mariam Janashvili (GEO)
−52 kg	Gwenaelle Patin (FRA)	Theodora Balasoiu (ROU)	Larissa Van Krevel (NED)
−57 kg	Hilde Jager (NED)	Stefania Adelina Dobre (ROU)	Ilayda Seyis (TUR)
−57 kg	Hilde Jager (NED)	Stefania Adelina Dobre (ROU)	Jennifer Vogel (GER)
−63 kg	Lisa Müllenberg (NED)	Szabina Gercsák (HUN)	Buga Kovac (CRO)
−63 kg	Lisa Müllenberg (NED)	Szabina Gercsák (HUN)	Paz Liebel (ISR)
−70 kg	Giovanna Scoccimarro (GER)	Brigita Matić-Ljuba (CRO)	Sophie Berger (BEL)
−70 kg	Giovanna Scoccimarro (GER)	Brigita Matić-Ljuba (CRO)	Aleksandra Samardzic (BIH)
+70 kg	Kamila Pasternak (POL)	Eleonora Geri (ITA)	Marina Bukreeva (RUS)
+70 kg	Kamila Pasternak (POL)	Eleonora Geri (ITA)	Sara Rodriguez (ESP)

Source Results
