= Bosnia and Herzegovina at the 2014 Summer Youth Olympics =

- IOC code: BIH
- NOC: Olympic Committee of Bosnia and Herzegovina
- Website: www.okbih.ba

in Nanjing
- Competitors: 6 in 4 sports
- Flag bearer: Aleksandra Samardžić
- Medals Ranked 70th: Gold 0 Silver 1 Bronze 0 Total 1

Summer Youth Olympics appearances (overview)
- 2010; 2014; 2018

Bosnia and Herzegovina competed at the 2014 Summer Youth Olympics, in Nanjing, China from 16 August to 28 August 2014.

== Medalists ==
Medal	Name	Sport	Event	Date
Silver	Aleksandra Samardžić	Judo	Girls' -78 kg	19 August

== Athletics ==
Bosnia and Herzegovina qualified one athlete.

Qualification Legend: Q=Final A (medal); qB=Final B (non-medal); qC=Final C (non-medal); qD=Final D (non-medal); qE=Final E (non-medal)

Boys
Track & road events

Athlete	Event	Heats		Final	
Athlete	Event	Result	Rank	Result	Rank
Stefan Ćuković	1500 m	3:55.85 PB	16 qB	4:01.93	16

== Judo ==
Bosnia and Herzegovina qualified two athletes based on its performance at the 2013 Cadet World Judo Championships.

Individual

Athlete	Event	Round of 32	Round of 16	Quarterfinals	Semifinals	Rep 1	Rep 2	Rep 3	Rep 4	Final / BM	Rank
Athlete	Event	Opposition Result	Opposition Result	Opposition Result	Opposition Result	Opposition Result	Opposition Result	Opposition Result	Opposition Result	Opposition Result	Rank
Petar Zadro	Boys' -66 kg	Gandia (PUR); L 0000 – 0103	did not advance			Minkou (BLR); L 0000 – 0102	did not advance				17
Aleksandra Samardžić	Girls' 78 kg	—	Bye	Rodriguez (ESP); W 0002 – 0000	Duchene (FRA); W 1000 – 0001	Bye		—		Matic (CRO); L 0002 – 0001	2nd place, silver medalist(s)

Team

Athletes	Event	Round of 16	Quarterfinals	Semifinals	Final	Rank
Athletes	Event	Opposition Result	Opposition Result	Opposition Result	Opposition Result	Rank
Team Van De Walle; Paola Acevedo (PUR); Leyla Aliyeva (AZE); Nokutula Banda (ZAM); Marco Montoya (COL); Ivan Silva Morales (CUB); Unelle Snyman (RSA); Peta Zadro (BIH)	Mixed Team	Bye	Team Geesink (MIX); L 3 – 4	did not advance		5
Team Nevzorov; Mihanta Andriamifehy (MAD); Brigitte Carabalí (COL); Nicolas Grinda (MON); Bryan Jolly (AUS); Tamazi Kirakozashvili (GEO); Salim Rebahi (ALG); Aleksandra Samardzic (BIH)	Mixed Team	Bye	Team Douillet (MIX); L 2 – 5	did not advance		5

== Swimming ==
Bosnia and Herzegovina qualified two swimmers.

Boys

Athlete	Event	Heat		Semifinal		Final	
Athlete	Event	Time	Rank	Time	Rank	Time	Rank
Vedad Ramić	50 m freestyle	24.06	26	did not advance			
Vedad Ramić	50 m butterfly	25.36	24	did not advance			

Girls

Athlete	Event	Heat		Semifinal		Final	
Athlete	Event	Time	Rank	Time	Rank	Time	Rank
Branka Vranješ	100 m freestyle	58.64	29	did not advance			
Branka Vranješ	200 m freestyle	2:04.85	22	—		did not advance	

== Taekwondo ==
Bosnia and Herzegovina was given a wild card to compete.

Girls

Athlete	Event	Round of 16	Quarterfinals	Semifinals	Final	Rank
Athlete	Event	Opposition Result	Opposition Result	Opposition Result	Opposition Result	Rank
Amila Karšić	−49 kg	Bye	M Carrillo (MEX); L 1 – 20 (PTG)	did not advance		5
