= Kaja Schuster =

Slovenian judoka (born 2004)

Personal information
- Nickname: Šuša
- Born: 16 March 2004 (age 22) Ljubljana, Slovenia
- Occupation: Judoka

Sport
- Country: Slovenia
- Sport: Judo
- Weight class: ‍–‍70 kg
- Club: Judo klub Bežigrad
- Coached by: Luka Kuralt (club)

Achievements and titles
- World Champ.: R32 (2025)
- European Champ.: R32 (2024, 2025)
Medal record
Women's judo
Representing Slovenia
IJF Grand Prix
| Bronze medal – third place | 2025 Linz | ‍–‍70 kg |
European U23 Championships
| Bronze medal – third place | 2025 Chisinau | ‍–‍70 kg |
World Juniors Championships
| Bronze medal – third place | 2023 Odivelas | ‍–‍70 kg |
| Bronze medal – third place | 2024 Dushanbe | ‍–‍70 kg |
European Junior Championships
| Gold medal – first place | 2023 The Hague | ‍–‍70 kg |

Profile at external databases
- IJF: 58298
- JudoInside.com: 134343
- Updated on 19 August 2026

Kaja Schuster (born 16 March 2004) is a Slovenian judoka. She won the gold medal in the women's 70 kg event at the 2023 European Junior Championships held in The Hague, The Netherlands.

== Judo career ==
=== Early career ===
Schuster started judo at the age of six at the Bežigrad Judo Club.

In 2018, she won the gold medal at the U16 National championship in the category -48 kg. Then, a year later, she repeated her success in the category -57 kg. In the same year, she won silver at the National cadet championship. In 2020, she took part in the Senior National championship and won bronze. She repeated the success in 2021. At the 2021 European Cadet Championship in Riga, Latvia, she won 5th place in the -63 kg category. She competed in quite a few Cadet European Cups, and that year she won gold at the Cadet European Cup Teplice.

In 2022, she became National champion in Junior category and National vice-champion in Senior category of -63 kg. She won silver medal at European Cup in Sarajevo.

In 2023, Kaja moved to the -70 kg category. She started the year by winning the Junior European Cup in Lignano. She later won silver medal at European Cup in Riga. In September, she competed at the European Junior Championship in The Hague, The Netherlands, where she won a gold medal in the category -70 kg. A month later, she won a bronze medal at the World Junior Championships in Odivelas, Portugal.

=== Senior career ===
In 2024, she won gold medal at European Cup in Dubrovnik. She competed at 2024 European Championships in Zagreb, Croatia and lost against Dutch Hild Jager. In October, she won bronze medal in -70 kg at the World Junior Championships in Dushanbe, Tajikistan.

In 2025, she won bronze medal in -78 kg category at European Open in Ljubljana. In March she won bronze medal in -70 kg at Grand Prix Linz. In April, she competed at 2025 European Championships in Podgorica, Montenegro and lost against German Miriam Butkereit. In June, she competed at 2025 World Championships in Budapest, Hungary and lost against Japanese Shiho Tanaka. In October, she won bronze medal in -70 kg at the 2025 European U23 Championships in Chișinău, Moldova.
