= Kanan Nasibov =

Azerbaijani judoka (born 2004)

Personal information
- Native name: Kənan Nəsibov
- Born: 19 January 2004 (age 22)
- Occupation: Judoka

Sport
- Country: Azerbaijan
- Sport: Judo
- Weight class: +100 kg

Achievements and titles
- World Champ.: (bronze) (2026)
- European Champ.: R16 (2025)
Medal record
Men's judo
Representing Azerbaijan
World Championships
Bronze medal – third place	2026 Baku	+100 kg
IJF Grand Slam
Gold medal – first place	2026 Tashkent	+100 kg
IJF Grand Prix
Gold medal – first place	2025 Zagreb	+100 kg
Gold medal – first place	2026 Zagreb	+100 kg
Bronze medal – third place	2025 Lima	+100 kg
European U23 Championships
Gold medal – first place	2025 Chișinău	+100 kg
Gold medal – first place	2026 Naples	+100 kg
World Juniors Championships
Silver medal – second place	2024 Dushanbe	+100 kg
European Junior Championships
Bronze medal – third place	2024 Tallinn	+100 kg
European Youth Olympic Festival
Bronze medal – third place	2022 Poreč	+100 kg

Profile at external databases
- IJF: 64022
- JudoInside.com: 144197
- Updated on 15 November 2026

Kanan Nasibov (Azerbaijani: Kənan Nəsibov, born 19 January 2004) is an Azerbaijani judoka.

== Career ==
In October 2025, Nasibov competed at the 2025 Judo Grand Prix Lima and won a bronze medal in the +100 kg category, his first career IJF World Tour medal. On 1 November 2025, he competed at the 2025 European U23 Judo Championships and won a gold medal in the +100 kg category. Weeks later he competed at the 2025 Judo Grand Prix Zagreb and won a gold medal in the +100 kg category.

In March 2026, he competed at the 2026 Judo Grand Slam Tashkent and won his first career Judo Grand Slam gold medal in the +100 kg category. He defeated Uzbekistan's Alisher Yusupov in the final. In October 2026, he competed at the 2026 World Judo Championships and won a bronze medal in the +100 kg category. He lost to Ushangi Kokauri in the quarterfinals before fighting his way through the repechage to claim bronze. At the end of the month he competed at the 2026 European U23 Judo Championships and repeated as the +100 kg category champion.
