= Dmytro Raskin =

Ukrainian and Israeli judoka (born 1995)

Personal information
- Native name: Раскін Дмитро Леонідович
- Full name: Dmytro Leonidovych Raskin
- Born: 9 January 1995 (age 31) Odesa, Ukraine
- Occupation: Judoka

Sport
- Country: Ukraine (2011–14, 2022); Israel (2015–17)
- Sport: Judo
- Weight class: ‍–‍66 kg, ‍–‍73 kg
- Rank: 1st dan black belt
Medal record
Men's judo
Representing Ukraine
World Junior Championships
Bronze medal – third place	2013 Ljubljana	Men's team
European Junior Championships
Bronze medal – third place	2014 Bucharest	‍–‍66 kg

Profile at external databases
- IJF: 8361, 19885
- JudoInside.com: 63396
- Updated on 8 September 2025

Dmytro Leonidovych Raskin (Ukrainian: Дмитро Леонідович Раскін; born 9 January 1995) is a Ukrainian and Israeli judoka. He was a member of the Ukrainian national judo team from 2009 to 2019.

== Education ==
Raskin earned a master's degree in international law at the National University "Odesa Law Academy" in 2015, and a bachelor's degree in judo coaching and sports marketing at the K. D. Ushinsky South Ukrainian National Pedagogical University in 2020. Since 2020 he has been working on a doctoral dissertation (PhD) in sports sciences at the same university.

== Career ==
- Member of the Ukrainian national team (2009–2019)
- Winner and medalist at the Ukrainian Judo Championships
- Champion of Israel (2017)
- Winner and medalist at the European Cups, international tournaments among cadets, juniors, and seniors
- Bronze medalist at the 2014 European Junior Judo Championships (Bucharest)
- Winner of the U21 European Cup in Prague (2014)
- Bronze medalist in the team event at the 2013 World Judo Juniors Championships (Ljubljana)
