= Ruslan Shakhbazov =

Russian judoka (born 1996)

Personal information
- Born: 1 May 1996 (age 30)
- Occupation: Judoka

Sport
- Country: Russia
- Sport: Judo
- Weight class: +100 kg
Medal record
Men's judo
Representing Russia
IJF Grand Slam
Silver medal – second place	2019 Baku	+100 kg
IJF Grand Prix
Bronze medal – third place	2018 Tunis	+100 kg
European U23 Championships
Gold medal – first place	2018 Győr	+100 kg
World Juniors Championships
Bronze medal – third place	2014 Fort Lauderdale	+100 kg
European Junior Championships
Gold medal – first place	2016 Málaga	+100 kg
Silver medal – second place	2014 Bucharest	+100 kg
Silver medal – second place	2015 Oberwart	+100 kg
World Cadets Championships
Bronze medal – third place	2013 Miami	+90 kg
European Cadet Championships
Gold medal – first place	2013 Tallinn	+90 kg
Silver medal – second place	2012 Bar	+90 kg
Summer Universiade
Gold medal – first place	2019 Naples	+90 kg

Profile at external databases
- IJF: 13560
- JudoInside.com: 80192
- Updated on 21 November 2022

Ruslan Shakhbazov (born 1 May 1996) is a Russian judoka.

Shakhbazov is the silver medalist of the 2019 Judo Grand Slam Baku in the +100 kg category.
