= Szabina Gercsák =

Hungarian judoka (born 1996)

Personal information
- Born: 9 July 1996 (age 29)
- Occupation: Judoka

Sport
- Country: Hungary
- Sport: Judo
- Weight class: ‍–‍63 kg, ‍–‍70 kg

Achievements and titles
- Olympic Games: R32 (2024)
- World Champ.: 7th (2025)
- European Champ.: (bronze) (2016)
Medal record
Women's judo
Representing Hungary
European Championships
Bronze medal – third place	2016 Kazan	‍–‍70 kg
IJF Grand Slam
Bronze medal – third place	2024 Baku	‍–‍70 kg
Bronze medal – third place	2024 Dushanbe	‍–‍70 kg
IJF Grand Prix
Silver medal – second place	2016 Havana	‍–‍70 kg
Silver medal – second place	2022 Almada	‍–‍70 kg
Bronze medal – third place	2014 Samsun	‍–‍63 kg
Bronze medal – third place	2017 Tbilisi	‍–‍70 kg
Bronze medal – third place	2017 Tashkent	‍–‍70 kg
Bronze medal – third place	2018 Tashkent	‍–‍70 kg
Bronze medal – third place	2023 Almada	‍–‍70 kg
European U23 Championships
Gold medal – first place	2015 Bratislava	‍–‍70 kg
Gold medal – first place	2016 Tel Aviv	‍–‍70 kg
Bronze medal – third place	2017 Podgorica	‍–‍70 kg
Bronze medal – third place	2018 Győr	‍–‍70 kg
World Juniors Championships
Gold medal – first place	2015 Abu Dhabi	‍–‍70 kg
European Junior Championships
Gold medal – first place	2014 Bucharest	‍–‍63 kg
Gold medal – first place	2015 Oberwart	‍–‍70 kg
Silver medal – second place	2013 Sarajevo	‍–‍63 kg
Bronze medal – third place	2016 Málaga	‍–‍70 kg
World Cadets Championships
Gold medal – first place	2013 Miami	‍–‍63 kg
European Cadet Championships
Gold medal – first place	2013 Tallinn	‍–‍63 kg
Bronze medal – third place	2012 Bar	‍–‍63 kg
Youth Olympic Games
Gold medal – first place	2014 Nanjing	‍–‍63 kg

Profile at external databases
- IJF: 7813
- JudoInside.com: 56389
- Updated on 16 June 2025

Szabina Gercsák (born 9 July 1996) is a Hungarian judoka.

Gercsák is a bronze medalist from the 2016 European Judo Championships in the ‍–‍70 kg category.
