= Aleksandra Andrić =

Serbian judoka (born 2002)

Personal information
- Born: 21 January 2008 (age 18)
- Occupation: Judoka

Sport
- Country: Serbia
- Sport: Judo
- Weight class: ‍–‍70 kg

Achievements and titles
- World Champ.: 5th (2026)
- European Champ.: (bronze) (2025)
Medal record
Women's judo
Representing Serbia
European Championships
Bronze medal – third place	2025 Podgorica	‍–‍70 kg
IJF Grand Prix
Bronze medal – third place	2025 Zagreb	‍–‍70 kg
Bronze medal – third place	2026 Qingdao	‍–‍70 kg
World Juniors Championships
Gold medal – first place	2026 Tashkent	‍–‍70 kg
Silver medal – second place	2025 Lima	‍–‍70 kg
European Junior Championships
Bronze medal – third place	2024 Tallinn	‍–‍70 kg
World Cadets Championships
Gold medal – first place	2023 Zagreb	‍–‍70 kg
European Cadet Championships
Gold medal – first place	2024 Sofia	‍–‍70 kg
European Youth Olympic Festival
Gold medal – first place	2025 Skopje	‍–‍70 kg
Mediterranean Games
Silver medal – second place	2026 Taranto	‍–‍70 kg

Profile at external databases
- IJF: 72416
- JudoInside.com: 97751
- Updated on 20 November 2026

Aleksandra Andrić (Serbian Cyrillic: Александра Андрић; born 21 January 2008) is a Serbian judoka.

== Career ==
In August 2023, Andrić competed at the 2023 World Judo Cadets Championships and won a gold medal in the –70 kg category. In June 2024, she won a gold medal at the 2024 European Cadet Judo Championships in the –70 kg category. In September 2024, she competed at the 2024 European Junior Judo Championships and won a bronze medal in the –70 kg category.

In April 2025, she competed at the 2025 European Judo Championships and won a bronze medal in the –70 kg category. In July 2025, she competed at the 2025 European Youth Summer Olympic Festival and won a gold medal in the –70 kg category. In October 2025, she competed at the 2025 World Judo Juniors Championships and won a silver medal in the –70 kg category.

In August 2026, she competed at the 2026 Mediterranean Games and won a silver medal in the –70 kg category. In October 2026, she competed at the 2026 World Judo Championships and advanced to the semifinals of the –70 kg category, and lost to Spain's Ai Tsunoda. In the repechage, she lost to Russia's Madina Taimazova. The next month she competed at the 2026 World Judo Juniors Championships and won a gold medal in the –70 kg category.

== Personal life ==
Andrić's younger sister, Nina Andric, is also a judoka.
