= Betina Temelkova =

Bulgarian-Israeli judoka

Personal information
- Native name: Бетина Темелкова בטינה טמלקובה
- Born: 26 February 1997 (age 29)
- Occupation: Judoka
- Spouse: Baruch Shmailov

Sport
- Country: Bulgaria (1997–2016); Israel (2017–19)
- Sport: Judo
- Weight class: ‍–‍52 kg

Achievements and titles
- World Champ.: R64 (2018)
- European Champ.: R16 (2018)
Medal record
Women's judo
Representing Bulgaria
European Junior Championships
Silver medal – second place	2015 Oberwart	‍–‍52 kg
World Cadets Championships
Bronze medal – third place	2013 Miami	‍–‍48 kg
European Cadet Championships
Gold medal – first place	2012 Bar	‍–‍48 kg
Silver medal – second place	2014 Athens	‍–‍52 kg
Youth Olympic Games
Silver medal – second place	2014 Nanjing	‍–‍52 kg
European Youth Olympic Festival
Silver medal – second place	2013 Utrecht	‍–‍48 kg
Representing Israel
IJF Grand Prix
Gold medal – first place	2017 Tashkent	‍–‍52 kg
European U23 Championships
Gold medal – first place	2018 Győr	‍–‍52 kg
European Junior Championships
Silver medal – second place	2017 Maribor	‍–‍52 kg

Profile at external databases
- IJF: 39552
- JudoInside.com: 74786
- Updated on 19 February 2022

Betina "Beti" Temelkova (Bulgarian: Бетина "Бети" Темелкова, Hebrew: בטינה "בטי" טמלקובה; born 26 February 1997) is a Bulgarian-Israeli female judoka. She won the gold medal in the 2018 European U23 Championships.

== Judo career ==
Starting in 2017, Bulgarian-born Temelkova competed for Israel, where she resides with her Israeli husband and fellow judoka Israeli Olympian Baruch Shmailov, although she received her full Israeli citizenship only in 2019.

That year, Temelkova won the gold medal at the 2017 Tashkent Grand Prix. She also won gold medals in the 2017 Leibnitz Junior European Cup and the 2017 La Coruna Junior European Cup.

Temelkova won the gold medal in the 2018 European U23 Championships.
