= 2023 European Junior Judo Championships =

Judo competition

Judo 2023 European Junior Judo Championships
- Venue: Sportcampus Zuiderpark
- Location: The Hague, Netherlands
- Dates: 7–10 September 2023
- Competitors: 366 from 43 nations

Champions
- Mixed team: Georgia (1st title)

Competition at external databases
- Links: IJF • JudoInside

The 2023 European Junior Judo Championships was held at the Sportcampus Zuiderpark in The Hague, Netherlands, from 7 to 10 September 2023. The final day of the competition featured a mixed-team event.

== Medal table ==
* Host nation (Netherlands)

Rank	Nation	Gold	Silver	Bronze	Total
1	Italy (ITA)	5	1	1	7
2	Georgia (GEO)	4	0	1	5
3	Netherlands (NED)*	3	1	0	4
4	Azerbaijan (AZE)	1	2	3	6
5	Slovenia (SLO)	1	0	1	2
5	Turkey (TUR)	1	0	1	2
7	France (FRA)	0	3	2	5
8	Israel (ISR)	0	2	1	3
9	Portugal (POR)	0	1	2	3
9	Spain (ESP)	0	1	2	3
9	Ukraine (UKR)	0	1	2	3
12	Belgium (BEL)	0	1	1	2
13	Cyprus (CYP)	0	1	0	1
13	Finland (FIN)	0	1	0	1
15	Germany (GER)	0	0	4	4
16	Poland (POL)	0	0	2	2
17	Armenia (ARM)	0	0	1	1
17	Austria (AUT)	0	0	1	1
17	Croatia (CRO)	0	0	1	1
17	Great Britain (GBR)	0	0	1	1
17	Romania (ROU)	0	0	1	1
17	Serbia (SRB)	0	0	1	1
17	Switzerland (SUI)	0	0	1	1
Totals (23 entries)		15	15	30	60

== Medal summary ==
=== Men's events ===
Event	Gold	Silver	Bronze
Extra-lightweight (−60 kg)	Nizami Imranov; Azerbaijan	Yehonatan Veksler; Israel	Olivier Naert; Belgium
Extra-lightweight (−60 kg)	Nizami Imranov; Azerbaijan	Yehonatan Veksler; Israel	Ashik Andreyan; Armenia
Half-lightweight (−66 kg)	Tengo Zirakashvili; Georgia	Aydin Rzayev; Azerbaijan	Miguel Nery Gago; Portugal
Half-lightweight (−66 kg)	Tengo Zirakashvili; Georgia	Aydin Rzayev; Azerbaijan	İbrahim Demirel; Turkey
Lightweight (−73 kg)	Giorgi Terashvili; Georgia	Otari Kvantidze; Portugal	Luke Davies; Great Britain
Lightweight (−73 kg)	Giorgi Terashvili; Georgia	Otari Kvantidze; Portugal	Vusal Galandarzade; Azerbaijan
Half-middleweight (−81 kg)	Bright Maddaloni Nosa; Italy	Igor Tsurkan; Ukraine	Omar Rajabli; Azerbaijan
Half-middleweight (−81 kg)	Bright Maddaloni Nosa; Italy	Igor Tsurkan; Ukraine	Luka Babutsidze; Georgia
Middleweight (−90 kg)	Lars van Oostrum; Netherlands	Vugar Talibov; Azerbaijan	Lasse Schriever; Germany
Middleweight (−90 kg)	Lars van Oostrum; Netherlands	Vugar Talibov; Azerbaijan	Miljan Radulj; Serbia
Half-heavyweight (−100 kg)	Jean Carletti; Italy	Mathias Anglionin; France	Bogdan Petre; Romania
Half-heavyweight (−100 kg)	Jean Carletti; Italy	Mathias Anglionin; France	Pierre Ederer; Germany
Heavyweight (+100 kg)	Shalva Gureshidze; Georgia	Giannis Antoniou; Cyprus	Mykola Hrybyk; Ukraine
Heavyweight (+100 kg)	Shalva Gureshidze; Georgia	Giannis Antoniou; Cyprus	Grzegorz Teresiński; Poland

=== Women's events ===
Event	Gold	Silver	Bronze
Extra-lightweight (−48 kg)	Merve Azak; Turkey	Sofia Mazzola; Italy	Giulia Ghiglione; Italy
Extra-lightweight (−48 kg)	Merve Azak; Turkey	Sofia Mazzola; Italy	Pauline Cuq; France
Half-lightweight (−52 kg)	Giulia Carnà; Italy	Ariane Toro; Spain	Aydan Valiyeva; Azerbaijan
Half-lightweight (−52 kg)	Giulia Carnà; Italy	Ariane Toro; Spain	Lena Djeriou; Germany
Lightweight (−57 kg)	Veronica Toniolo; Italy	Pihla Salonen; Finland	Adriana Rodríguez Salvador; Spain
Lightweight (−57 kg)	Veronica Toniolo; Italy	Pihla Salonen; Finland	Binta Ndiaye; Switzerland
Half-middleweight (−63 kg)	Savita Russo; Italy	Melkia Auchecorne; France	Martyna Glubiak; Poland
Half-middleweight (−63 kg)	Savita Russo; Italy	Melkia Auchecorne; France	Nina Simić; Croatia
Middleweight (−70 kg)	Kaja Schuster; Slovenia	Adelina Novitzki; Israel	Elena Dengg; Austria
Middleweight (−70 kg)	Kaja Schuster; Slovenia	Adelina Novitzki; Israel	Nika Koren; Slovenia
Half-heavyweight (−78 kg)	Lieke Derks; Netherlands	Morgane Rubiano; France	Mathilda Sophie Niemeyer; Germany
Half-heavyweight (−78 kg)	Lieke Derks; Netherlands	Morgane Rubiano; France	Yuliia Kurchenko; Ukraine
Heavyweight (+78 kg)	Paulien Sweers; Netherlands	Gabrielle Bouvier; Belgium	Yuli Alma Mishiner; Israel
Heavyweight (+78 kg)	Paulien Sweers; Netherlands	Gabrielle Bouvier; Belgium	Eunate Etxebarria Bilbao; Spain

Source Results

=== Mixed ===
Event	Gold	Silver	Bronze
Mixed team	Georgia	Netherlands	France
Mixed team	Georgia	Netherlands	Portugal

Source Results:
