= 2015 European Junior Judo Championships =

Judo competition

Judo 2015 European Junior Judo Championships
- Location: Oberwart, Austria
- Dates: 18–20 September 2015
- Competitors: 409 from 41 nations

Champions
- Men's team: Russia
- Women's team: France

Competition at external databases
- Links: IJF • EJU • JudoInside

The 2015 European Junior Judo Championships is an edition of the European Junior Judo Championships, organised by the European Judo Union.It was held in Oberwart, Austria from 18 to 20 September 2015. The final day of competition featured team events, with team Russia winning the men's event and team France the women's.

== Medal summary ==
=== Medal table ===
* Host nation (Austria)

| Rank | Nation | Gold | Silver | Bronze | Total |
|---|---|---|---|---|---|
| 1 | Netherlands (NED) | 4 | 1 | 1 | 6 |
| 2 | Georgia (GEO) | 3 | 0 | 2 | 5 |
| 3 | France (FRA) | 2 | 0 | 4 | 6 |
| 4 | Hungary (HUN) | 2 | 0 | 0 | 2 |
| 5 | Russia (RUS) | 1 | 3 | 4 | 8 |
| 6 | Great Britain (GBR) | 1 | 1 | 1 | 3 |
| 6 | Ukraine (UKR) | 1 | 1 | 1 | 3 |
| 8 | Montenegro (MNE) | 1 | 0 | 0 | 1 |
| 8 | Romania (ROU) | 1 | 0 | 0 | 1 |
| 10 | Moldova (MDA) | 0 | 1 | 3 | 4 |
| 10 | Poland (POL) | 0 | 1 | 3 | 4 |
| 10 | Turkey (TUR) | 0 | 1 | 3 | 4 |
| 13 | Germany (GER) | 0 | 1 | 1 | 2 |
| 13 | Portugal (POR) | 0 | 1 | 1 | 2 |
| 13 | Spain (ESP) | 0 | 1 | 1 | 2 |
| 16 | Bulgaria (BUL) | 0 | 1 | 0 | 1 |
| 16 | Croatia (CRO) | 0 | 1 | 0 | 1 |
| 16 | Greece (GRE) | 0 | 1 | 0 | 1 |
| 16 | Slovenia (SLO) | 0 | 1 | 0 | 1 |
| 20 | Armenia (ARM) | 0 | 0 | 2 | 2 |
| 20 | Bosnia and Herzegovina (BIH) | 0 | 0 | 2 | 2 |
| 22 | Austria (AUT)* | 0 | 0 | 1 | 1 |
| 22 | Kosovo (KOS) | 0 | 0 | 1 | 1 |
| 22 | Serbia (SRB) | 0 | 0 | 1 | 1 |
| Totals (24 entries) | | 16 | 16 | 32 | 64 |

=== Men's events ===
| Event | Gold | Silver | Bronze |
|---|---|---|---|
| −55 kg | Roy Koffijberg (NED) | Ayub Bliev (RUS) | Shahen Abaghyan (ARM) |
| −55 kg | Roy Koffijberg (NED) | Ayub Bliev (RUS) | Vahagn Hovsepyan (ARM) |
| −60 kg | Walide Khyar (FRA) | Samuel Hall (GBR) | Denis Vieru (MDA) |
| −60 kg | Walide Khyar (FRA) | Samuel Hall (GBR) | Tornike Nagliashvili (GEO) |
| −66 kg | Pavel Patokov (RUS) | Bogdan Iadov (UKR) | Patryk Wawrzyczek (POL) |
| −66 kg | Pavel Patokov (RUS) | Bogdan Iadov (UKR) | Bilal Çiloğlu (TUR) |
| −73 kg | Tamazi Kirakozashvili (GEO) | Martin Hojak (SLO) | Giorgi Katsiashvili (GEO) |
| −73 kg | Tamazi Kirakozashvili (GEO) | Martin Hojak (SLO) | Artem Khomula (UKR) |
| −81 kg | Frank de Wit (NED) | Nicon Zaborosciuc (MDA) | Joao Martinho (POR) |
| −81 kg | Frank de Wit (NED) | Nicon Zaborosciuc (MDA) | Dorin Gotonoaga (MDA) |
| −90 kg | Beka Gviniashvili (GEO) | David Tekic (GER) | Piotr Kuczera (POL) |
| −90 kg | Beka Gviniashvili (GEO) | David Tekic (GER) | Mikhail Igolnikov (RUS) |
| −100 kg | Danilo Pantić (MNE) | Oleg Abaev (RUS) | Joseph Terhec (FRA) |
| −100 kg | Danilo Pantić (MNE) | Oleg Abaev (RUS) | Niyaz Ilyasov (RUS) |
| +100 kg | Guram Tushishvili (GEO) | Ruslan Shakhbazov (RUS) | Žarko Ćulum (SRB) |
| +100 kg | Guram Tushishvili (GEO) | Ruslan Shakhbazov (RUS) | Harun Sadikovic (BIH) |
| Team | Russia | Germany | Georgia |
| Team | Russia | Germany | Belarus |

=== Women's events ===
| Event | Gold | Silver | Bronze |
|---|---|---|---|
| −44 kg | Amber Gersjes (NED) | Melisa Çakmaklı (TUR) | Tugba Yayla (TUR) |
| −44 kg | Amber Gersjes (NED) | Melisa Çakmaklı (TUR) | Sitora Boymatova (RUS) |
| −48 kg | Réka Pupp (HUN) | Joana Diogo (POR) | Cristina Budescu (MDA) |
| −48 kg | Réka Pupp (HUN) | Joana Diogo (POR) | Sephora Corcher (FRA) |
| −52 kg | Astride Gneto (FRA) | Betina Temelkova (BUL) | Distria Krasniqi (KOS) |
| −52 kg | Astride Gneto (FRA) | Betina Temelkova (BUL) | Damla Caliskan (TUR) |
| −57 kg | Stefania Adelina Dobre (ROU) | Tecla Cadilla (ESP) | Bekky Livesey (GBR) |
| −57 kg | Stefania Adelina Dobre (ROU) | Tecla Cadilla (ESP) | Julia Kowalczyk (POL) |
| −63 kg | Lucy Renshall (GBR) | Elisavet Teltsidou (GRE) | Selina Dietzer (GER) |
| −63 kg | Lucy Renshall (GBR) | Elisavet Teltsidou (GRE) | Geke van den Berg (NED) |
| −70 kg | Szabina Gercsák (HUN) | Sanne van Dijke (NED) | Aleksandra Samardzic (BIH) |
| −70 kg | Szabina Gercsák (HUN) | Sanne van Dijke (NED) | Michaela Polleres (AUT) |
| −78 kg | Larissa Groenwold (NED) | Brigita Matić-Ljuba (CRO) | Morgane Duchene (FRA) |
| −78 kg | Larissa Groenwold (NED) | Brigita Matić-Ljuba (CRO) | Sara Rodriguez (ESP) |
| +78 kg | Vasylyna Kyrychenko (UKR) | Anna Zaleczna (POL) | Iuliia Lianichenko (RUS) |
| +78 kg | Vasylyna Kyrychenko (UKR) | Anna Zaleczna (POL) | Roudelie Caroly (FRA) |
| Team | France | Slovenia | Russia |
| Team | France | Slovenia | Germany |

Source Results
