= Madagascar at the 2014 Summer Youth Olympics =

- IOC code: MAD
- NOC: Comité Olympique Malgache

in Nanjing
- Competitors: 3 in 3 sports
- Medals: Gold 0 Silver 0 Bronze 0 Total 0

Summer Youth Olympics appearances
- 2010; 2014; 2018

Madagascar competed at the 2014 Summer Youth Olympics, in Nanjing, China from 16 August to 28 August 2014.

== Athletics ==
Madagascar qualified one athlete.

Qualification Legend: Q=Final A (medal); qB=Final B (non-medal); qC=Final C (non-medal); qD=Final D (non-medal); qE=Final E (non-medal)

Boys
Track & road events

Athlete	Event	Heats		Final	
Athlete	Event	Result	Rank	Result	Rank
Izidor Ralahimihaja	800 m	2:00.93	16 qC	2:00.35	15

== Judo ==
Madagascar was given a quota to compete by the tripartite committee.

Individual

Athlete	Event	Round of 32	Round of 16	Quarterfinals	Semifinals	Rep 1	Rep 2	Rep 3	Rep 3	Final / BM	Rank
Athlete	Event	Opposition Result	Opposition Result	Opposition Result	Opposition Result	Opposition Result	Opposition Result	Opposition Result	Opposition Result	Opposition Result	Rank
Mihanta Andriamifehy	Girls' -52 kg	Bye	M Janashvili (GEO); L 0000 – 1000	did not advance		Bye	X Liu (CHN); L 0000 – 0012	did not advance			13

Team

Athletes	Event	Round of 16	Quarterfinals	Semifinals	Final	Rank
Athletes	Event	Opposition Result	Opposition Result	Opposition Result	Opposition Result	Rank
Team Nevzorov; Mihanta Andriamifehy (MAD); Brigitte Carabalí (COL); Nicolas Grinda (MON); Bryan Jolly (AUS); Tamazi Kirakozashvili (GEO); Salim Rebahi (ALG); Aleksandra Samardzic (BIH)	Mixed Team	Bye	Team Douillet (MIX); L 2 – 5	did not advance		5

== Swimming ==
Madagascar qualified one swimmer.

Boys

Athlete	Event	Heat		Semifinal		Final	
Athlete	Event	Time	Rank	Time	Rank	Time	Rank
Lalanomena Andrianirina	200 m backstroke	2:19.68	29	—		did not advance	
Lalanomena Andrianirina	100 m butterfly	1:03.26	24	did not advance			
