= 2025 World Judo Juniors Championships =

Judo competition

Judo 2025 World Judo Juniors Championships
- Venue: Coliseo Eduardo Dibos
- Location: Lima, Peru
- Dates: 5–8 October 2025
- Competitors: 463 from 65 nations
- Total prize money: €99,800

Champions
- Mixed team: Japan (7th title)

Competition at external databases
- Links: IJF • JudoInside

The 2025 World Judo Juniors Championships were held at the Coliseo Eduardo Dibós arena in Lima, Peru, from 5 to 8 October 2025 as part of the IJF World Tour. A mixed teams event took place on the competition's last day.

== Medal summary ==
=== Men's events ===
| Event | Gold | Silver | Bronze |
|---|---|---|---|
| Extra-lightweight (−60 kg) | Retsu Matsunaga (JPN) | Yusei Adachi (JPN) | Jonathan Yang (USA) |
| Extra-lightweight (−60 kg) | Retsu Matsunaga (JPN) | Yusei Adachi (JPN) | Samariddin Kuchkarov (UZB) |
| Half-lightweight (−66 kg) | Tornike Gigauri (GEO) | Abdullakh Parchiev (IJF) | Mahammad Musayev (AZE) |
| Half-lightweight (−66 kg) | Tornike Gigauri (GEO) | Abdullakh Parchiev (IJF) | Shuntaro Fukuchi (JPN) |
| Lightweight (−73 kg) | Muhiddin Asadulloev (TJK) | Ryusei Arakawa (JPN) | Keito Kihara (JPN) |
| Lightweight (−73 kg) | Muhiddin Asadulloev (TJK) | Ryusei Arakawa (JPN) | Irakli Goginashvili (GBR) |
| Half-middleweight (−81 kg) | Haru Akita (JPN) | Akhmed Turluev (IJF) | Mihajlo Simin (SRB) |
| Half-middleweight (−81 kg) | Haru Akita (JPN) | Akhmed Turluev (IJF) | Samariddin Muxibiddinov (UZB) |
| Middleweight (−90 kg) | Jesse Barbosa (BRA) | João Segatelle (BRA) | Paul Friedrichs (GER) |
| Middleweight (−90 kg) | Jesse Barbosa (BRA) | João Segatelle (BRA) | Alisher Samanov (UZB) |
| Half-heavyweight (−100 kg) | Milan Bulaja (SRB) | Shokei Hirano (JPN) | Lazar Ždrale (SRB) |
| Half-heavyweight (−100 kg) | Milan Bulaja (SRB) | Shokei Hirano (JPN) | Mukhammadali Zoirov (UZB) |
| Heavyweight (+100 kg) | Bislan Katamardov (IJF) | Gai Hatakeyama (JPN) | Matheo Akiana Mongo (FRA) |
| Heavyweight (+100 kg) | Bislan Katamardov (IJF) | Gai Hatakeyama (JPN) | Mortaza Suha (GER) |

=== Women's events ===
| Event | Gold | Silver | Bronze |
|---|---|---|---|
| Extra-lightweight (−48 kg) | Sachiyo Yoshino (JPN) | Aitana Diaz Hernandez (ESP) | Laziza Haydarova (UZB) |
| Extra-lightweight (−48 kg) | Sachiyo Yoshino (JPN) | Aitana Diaz Hernandez (ESP) | Morgane Annis (FRA) |
| Half-lightweight (−52 kg) | Nicole Marques (BRA) | Leomaris Ruiz (VEN) | Hako Fukunaga (JPN) |
| Half-lightweight (−52 kg) | Nicole Marques (BRA) | Leomaris Ruiz (VEN) | Tabea Mecklenburg (GER) |
| Lightweight (−57 kg) | Mio Shirakane (JPN) | Dana Abdirova (KAZ) | Gyovanna Andrade (BRA) |
| Lightweight (−57 kg) | Mio Shirakane (JPN) | Dana Abdirova (KAZ) | Asuka Ueno (JPN) |
| Half-middleweight (−63 kg) | So Morichika (JPN) | Viktoriia Martynenko (IJF) | Linthoi Chanambam (IND) |
| Half-middleweight (−63 kg) | So Morichika (JPN) | Viktoriia Martynenko (IJF) | Savita Russo (ITA) |
| Middleweight (−70 kg) | April Lynn Fohouo (SUI) | Aleksandra Andrić (SRB) | Teophila Darbes-Takam (FRA) |
| Middleweight (−70 kg) | April Lynn Fohouo (SUI) | Aleksandra Andrić (SRB) | Jana Cvjetko (CRO) |
| Half-heavyweight (−78 kg) | Maria Hanstede (NED) | Mathilda Sophie Niemeyer (GER) | Alexandra Riabchenko (IJF) |
| Half-heavyweight (−78 kg) | Maria Hanstede (NED) | Mathilda Sophie Niemeyer (GER) | Dandara Camillo (BRA) |
| Heavyweight (+78 kg) | Célia Cancan (FRA) | Umida Nigmatova (UZB) | Léonie Minkada-Caquineau (FRA) |
| Heavyweight (+78 kg) | Célia Cancan (FRA) | Umida Nigmatova (UZB) | Yuli Alma Mishiner (ISR) |

=== Mixed ===
| Event | Gold | Silver | Bronze |
|---|---|---|---|
| Mixed team | Japan | France | Brazil |
| Mixed team | Japan | France | International Judo Federation |

Source results:

=== Medal table ===
* Host nation (Peru)

| Rank | Nation | Gold | Silver | Bronze | Total |
|---|---|---|---|---|---|
| 1 | Japan (JPN) | 6 | 4 | 4 | 14 |
| 2 | Brazil (BRA) | 2 | 1 | 3 | 6 |
| 3 | International Judo Federation (IJF) | 1 | 3 | 2 | 6 |
| 4 | France (FRA) | 1 | 1 | 4 | 6 |
| 5 | Serbia (SRB) | 1 | 1 | 2 | 4 |
| 6 | Georgia (GEO) | 1 | 0 | 0 | 1 |
| 6 | Netherlands (NED) | 1 | 0 | 0 | 1 |
| 6 | Switzerland (SUI) | 1 | 0 | 0 | 1 |
| 6 | Tajikistan (TJK) | 1 | 0 | 0 | 1 |
| 10 | Uzbekistan (UZB) | 0 | 1 | 5 | 6 |
| 11 | Germany (GER) | 0 | 1 | 3 | 4 |
| 12 | Kazakhstan (KAZ) | 0 | 1 | 0 | 1 |
| 12 | Spain (ESP) | 0 | 1 | 0 | 1 |
| 12 | Venezuela (VEN) | 0 | 1 | 0 | 1 |
| 15 | Azerbaijan (AZE) | 0 | 0 | 1 | 1 |
| 15 | Croatia (CRO) | 0 | 0 | 1 | 1 |
| 15 | Great Britain (GBR) | 0 | 0 | 1 | 1 |
| 15 | India (IND) | 0 | 0 | 1 | 1 |
| 15 | Israel (ISR) | 0 | 0 | 1 | 1 |
| 15 | Italy (ITA) | 0 | 0 | 1 | 1 |
| 15 | United States (USA) | 0 | 0 | 1 | 1 |
| Totals (21 entries) | | 15 | 15 | 30 | 60 |

== Prize money ==
The sums written are per medalist, bringing the total prizes awarded to €79,800 for the individual contests and €20,000 for the team competition. (retrieved from:)

| Medal | Individual | | | Mixed team | | |
| Medal | Total | Judoka | Coach | Total | Judoka | Coach |
| Gold | €2,500 | €2,000 | €500 | €8,000 | €6,400 | €1,600 |
| Silver | €1,500 | €1,200 | €300 | €5,600 | €4,480 | €1,120 |
| Bronze | €850 | €680 | €170 | €3,200 | €2,560 | €640 |
