= 2016 European Junior Judo Championships =

Judo competition

Judo 2016 European Junior Judo Championships
- Venue: Palacio Deportes José María Martín Carpena
- Location: Málaga, Spain
- Dates: 16–18 September 2016
- Competitors: 405 from 41 nations

Champions
- Men's team: Georgia
- Women's team: Germany

Competition at external databases
- Links: IJF • EJU • JudoInside

The 2016 European Junior Judo Championships is an edition of the European Junior Judo Championships, organised by the European Judo Union.It was held in Málaga, Spain from 16 to 18 September 2016. The final day of competition featured team events, with team Georgia winning the men's event and team Germany the women's.

== Medal summary ==
=== Medal table ===
* Host nation (Spain)

Rank	Nation	Gold	Silver	Bronze	Total
1	France (FRA)	3	1	4	8
2	Russia (RUS)	2	2	5	9
3	Germany (GER)	2	2	2	6
4	Serbia (SRB)	2	0	2	4
5	Netherlands (NED)	2	0	1	3
6	Azerbaijan (AZE)	2	0	0	2
7	Ukraine (UKR)	1	1	1	3
8	Austria (AUT)	1	0	1	2
8	Belarus (BLR)	1	0	1	2
10	Spain (ESP)*	0	2	1	3
11	Georgia (GEO)	0	2	0	2
11	Turkey (TUR)	0	2	0	2
13	Croatia (CRO)	0	1	1	2
13	Slovenia (SLO)	0	1	1	2
15	Great Britain (GBR)	0	1	0	1
15	Portugal (POR)	0	1	0	1
17	Italy (ITA)	0	0	3	3
18	Hungary (HUN)	0	0	2	2
18	Poland (POL)	0	0	2	2
20	Belgium (BEL)	0	0	1	1
20	Israel (ISR)	0	0	1	1
20	Montenegro (MNE)	0	0	1	1
20	Romania (ROU)	0	0	1	1
20	Switzerland (SUI)	0	0	1	1
Totals (24 entries)		16	16	32	64

=== Men's events ===
Event	Gold	Silver	Bronze
−55 kg	Natig Gurbanli (AZE)	Alii Pafov (RUS)	Andrea Carlino (ITA)
−55 kg	Natig Gurbanli (AZE)	Alii Pafov (RUS)	Maxime Merlin (FRA)
−60 kg	Tornike Tsjakadoea (NED)	Neil MacDonald (GBR)	Jolan Florimont (FRA)
−60 kg	Tornike Tsjakadoea (NED)	Neil MacDonald (GBR)	Manuel Lombardo (ITA)
−66 kg	Dzmitry Minkou (BLR)	Tornike Nagliashvili (GEO)	Alberto Gaitero Martin (ESP)
−66 kg	Dzmitry Minkou (BLR)	Tornike Nagliashvili (GEO)	Nils Stump (SUI)
−73 kg	Hidayat Heydarov (AZE)	Giorgi Katsiashvili (GEO)	Martin Hojak (SLO)
−73 kg	Hidayat Heydarov (AZE)	Giorgi Katsiashvili (GEO)	Christopher Wagner (AUT)
−81 kg	Nemanja Majdov (SRB)	Anri Egutidze (POR)	Tim Gramkow (GER)
−81 kg	Nemanja Majdov (SRB)	Anri Egutidze (POR)	Turpal Tepkaev (RUS)
−90 kg	Mikhail Igolnikov (RUS)	Nikoloz Sherazadishvili (ESP)	Marko Bubanja (MNE)
−90 kg	Mikhail Igolnikov (RUS)	Nikoloz Sherazadishvili (ESP)	Aurélien Diesse (FRA)
−100 kg	Aaron Fara (AUT)	Johannes Frey (GER)	Arman Adamian (RUS)
−100 kg	Aaron Fara (AUT)	Johannes Frey (GER)	Mikita Sviryd (BLR)
+100 kg	Ruslan Shakhbazov (RUS)	Fedir Panko (UKR)	Tamerlan Bashaev (RUS)
+100 kg	Ruslan Shakhbazov (RUS)	Fedir Panko (UKR)	Žarko Ćulum (SRB)
Team	Georgia	Azerbaijan	Italy
Team	Georgia	Azerbaijan	Russia

=== Women's events ===
Event	Gold	Silver	Bronze
−44 kg	Justine Deleuil (FRA)	Marine Gilly (FRA)	Loïs Petit (BEL)
−44 kg	Justine Deleuil (FRA)	Marine Gilly (FRA)	Vladlena Zershchikova (RUS)
−48 kg	Daria Bilodid (UKR)	Daria Pichkaleva (RUS)	Réka Pupp (HUN)
−48 kg	Daria Bilodid (UKR)	Daria Pichkaleva (RUS)	Miriam Schneider (GER)
−52 kg	Nadežda Petrović (SRB)	İrem Korkmaz (TUR)	Astride Gneto (FRA)
−52 kg	Nadežda Petrović (SRB)	İrem Korkmaz (TUR)	Tihea Topolovec (CRO)
−57 kg	Pauline Starke (GER)	Andreja Leški (SLO)	Stefania Adelina Dobre (ROU)
−57 kg	Pauline Starke (GER)	Andreja Leški (SLO)	Julia Kowalczyk (POL)
−63 kg	Sanne Vermeer (NED)	Lara Reimann (GER)	Inbal Shemesh (ISR)
−63 kg	Sanne Vermeer (NED)	Lara Reimann (GER)	Anja Obradović (SRB)
−70 kg	Marie-Ève Gahié (FRA)	Sara Rodriguez (ESP)	Szabina Gercsák (HUN)
−70 kg	Marie-Ève Gahié (FRA)	Sara Rodriguez (ESP)	Natascha Ausma (NED)
−78 kg	Anna-Maria Wagner (GER)	Brigita Matić-Ljuba (CRO)	Giorgia Stangherlin (ITA)
−78 kg	Anna-Maria Wagner (GER)	Brigita Matić-Ljuba (CRO)	Aleksandra Gimaletdinova (RUS)
+78 kg	Julia Tolofua (FRA)	Sebile Akbulut (TUR)	Anita Formela (POL)
+78 kg	Julia Tolofua (FRA)	Sebile Akbulut (TUR)	Vasylyna Kyrychenko (UKR)
Team	Germany	Russia	Croatia
Team	Germany	Russia	France

Source Results
