= 2026 European U23 Judo Championships =

Judo competition

Judo 2026 European U23 Judo Championships
- Venue: PalaVesuvio
- Location: Naples, Italy
- Dates: 30 October – 1 November 2026
- Competitors: 275 from 36 nations

Champions
- Mixed team: France (1st title)

Competition at external databases
- Links: IJF • JudoInside

The 2026 European U23 Judo Championships was held at the PalaVesuvio in Naples, Italy, from 30 October to 1 November 2026. The last day of competition featured a mixed team event.

== Medal summary ==
=== Men's events ===
Event	Gold	Silver	Bronze
Extra-lightweight (−60 kg)	Yehonatan Veksler (ISR)	Pietro Andreini (ITA)	Luka Gadelia (GEO)
Extra-lightweight (−60 kg)	Yehonatan Veksler (ISR)	Pietro Andreini (ITA)	Yahn Motoly-Bongambé (FRA)
Half-lightweight (−66 kg)	Islam Rahimov (AZE)	Jochem van Harten (NED)	Aleksa Milosevic (SRB)
Half-lightweight (−66 kg)	Islam Rahimov (AZE)	Jochem van Harten (NED)	Nazar Viskov (UKR)
Lightweight (−73 kg)	Fabrizio Esposito (ITA)	Victor Skerlev (BUL)	Mate Beruashvili (GEO)
Lightweight (−73 kg)	Fabrizio Esposito (ITA)	Victor Skerlev (BUL)	Vlad Mitru (MDA)
Half-middleweight (−81 kg)	Itay Bibitko (ISR)	Martin Brekke-Jenssen (NOR)	Ciprian Gribinet (MDA)
Half-middleweight (−81 kg)	Itay Bibitko (ISR)	Martin Brekke-Jenssen (NOR)	Erman Gürgen (TUR)
Middleweight (−90 kg)	Luka Javakhishvili (GEO)	Nikoloz Davladze (GEO)	Alex Marousek (CZE)
Middleweight (−90 kg)	Luka Javakhishvili (GEO)	Nikoloz Davladze (GEO)	Levente Kiss (HUN)
Half-heavyweight (−100 kg)	Azhdar Baghirov (AZE)	Jannis Baschin (GER)	Borna Butijer (CRO)
Half-heavyweight (−100 kg)	Azhdar Baghirov (AZE)	Jannis Baschin (GER)	Ronald Proell (AUT)
Heavyweight (+100 kg)	Kanan Nasibov (AZE)	Vidak Maljević (SRB)	Yann Rigaud (FRA)
Heavyweight (+100 kg)	Kanan Nasibov (AZE)	Vidak Maljević (SRB)	Mortaza Suha (GER)

=== Women's events ===
Event	Gold	Silver	Bronze
Extra-lightweight (−48 kg)	Laura Bogdan (ROU)	Lotte Vandevoort (BEL)	Szabina Szeleczki (HUN)
Extra-lightweight (−48 kg)	Laura Bogdan (ROU)	Lotte Vandevoort (BEL)	Zilan Ertem (TUR)
Half-lightweight (−52 kg)	Gaia Stella (ITA)	Marta Beorlegui Oses (ESP)	Pauline Cuq (FRA)
Half-lightweight (−52 kg)	Gaia Stella (ITA)	Marta Beorlegui Oses (ESP)	Ilay Hayun (ISR)
Lightweight (−57 kg)	Adriana Rodríguez Salvador (ESP)	Michela Terranova (ITA)	Nino Loladze (GEO)
Lightweight (−57 kg)	Adriana Rodríguez Salvador (ESP)	Michela Terranova (ITA)	Emma Melis (FRA)
Half-middleweight (−63 kg)	Nina Simić (CRO)	Nina Cvjetko (CRO)	Shenna Nitsche (GER)
Half-middleweight (−63 kg)	Nina Simić (CRO)	Nina Cvjetko (CRO)	Jelena Nišavić (SRB)
Middleweight (−70 kg)	Aleksandra Kowalewska (POL)	Valerie Tombou (BEL)	Tanja Gruenewald (GER)
Middleweight (−70 kg)	Aleksandra Kowalewska (POL)	Valerie Tombou (BEL)	Teophila Darbes-Takam (FRA)
Half-heavyweight (−78 kg)	Mathilda Sophie Niemeyer (GER)	Anna Kazakova (UKR)	Korina Džidić (CRO)
Half-heavyweight (−78 kg)	Mathilda Sophie Niemeyer (GER)	Anna Kazakova (UKR)	Nikolett Sági (HUN)
Heavyweight (+78 kg)	Roxana Vișa (ROU)	Gabrielle Bouvier (BEL)	Mama Coulibaly Toure (ESP)
Heavyweight (+78 kg)	Roxana Vișa (ROU)	Gabrielle Bouvier (BEL)	Diana Semchenko (UKR)

=== Mixed event ===
Event	Gold	Silver	Bronze
Mixed team	France	Georgia	Italy
Mixed team	France	Georgia	Germany

=== Medal table ===
* Host nation (Italy)

Rank	Nation	Gold	Silver	Bronze	Total
1	Azerbaijan (AZE)	3	0	0	3
2	Italy (ITA)*	2	2	1	5
3	Israel (ISR)	2	0	1	3
4	Romania (ROU)	2	0	0	2
5	Georgia (GEO)	1	2	3	6
6	Germany (GER)	1	1	4	6
7	Croatia (CRO)	1	1	2	4
8	Spain (ESP)	1	1	1	3
9	France (FRA)	1	0	5	6
10	Poland (POL)	1	0	0	1
11	Belgium (BEL)	0	3	0	3
12	Serbia (SRB)	0	1	2	3
12	Ukraine (UKR)	0	1	2	3
14	Bulgaria (BUL)	0	1	0	1
14	Netherlands (NED)	0	1	0	1
14	Norway (NOR)	0	1	0	1
17	Hungary (HUN)	0	0	3	3
18	Moldova (MDA)	0	0	2	2
18	Turkey (TUR)	0	0	2	2
20	Austria (AUT)	0	0	1	1
20	Czech Republic (CZE)	0	0	1	1
Totals (21 entries)		15	15	30	60
