= 2025 European U23 Judo Championships =

Judo competition

Judo 2025 European U23 Judo Championships
- Venue: Arena Chișinău
- Location: Chișinău, Moldova
- Dates: 31 October – 2 November 2025
- Competitors: 308 from 37 nations

Champions
- Mixed team: Georgia (3rd title)

Competition at external databases
- Links: IJF • JudoInside

The 2025 European U23 Judo Championships were held at the Chișinău Arena in Chișinău, Moldova, from 31 October to 2 November 2025. The last day of competition featured a mixed team event.

== Medal summary ==
=== Men's events ===
Event	Gold	Silver	Bronze
Extra-lightweight (−60 kg)	Vahe Aghasyan (ARM)	Mate Gogoberishvili (GEO)	Olivier Naert (BEL)
Extra-lightweight (−60 kg)	Vahe Aghasyan (ARM)	Mate Gogoberishvili (GEO)	Ksawery Ignasiak (POL)
Half-lightweight (−66 kg)	Islam Rahimov (AZE)	Jochem van Harten (NED)	Valerio Accogli (ITA)
Half-lightweight (−66 kg)	Islam Rahimov (AZE)	Jochem van Harten (NED)	Alessio De Luca (ITA)
Lightweight (−73 kg)	Ioan Dzițac (ROU)	Mate Beruashvili (GEO)	Otari Kvantidze (POR)
Lightweight (−73 kg)	Ioan Dzițac (ROU)	Mate Beruashvili (GEO)	Sos Hačatrjan (SRB)
Half-middleweight (−81 kg)	Manuel Parlati (ITA)	Omar Rajabli (AZE)	Bernd Fasching (AUT)
Half-middleweight (−81 kg)	Manuel Parlati (ITA)	Omar Rajabli (AZE)	Kote Kapanadze (GEO)
Middleweight (−90 kg)	Giorgi Jabniashvili (GEO)	Mihail Latișev (MDA)	Aslan Kotsoev (AZE)
Middleweight (−90 kg)	Giorgi Jabniashvili (GEO)	Mihail Latișev (MDA)	Vojin Mandić (SRB)
Half-heavyweight (−100 kg)	George Udsilauri (GER)	Fares Mekhoukh (FRA)	Jean Carletti (ITA)
Half-heavyweight (−100 kg)	George Udsilauri (GER)	Fares Mekhoukh (FRA)	Benjamin Mataseje (SVK)
Heavyweight (+100 kg)	Kanan Nasibov (AZE)	Jakub Sordyl (POL)	Shalva Gureshidze (GEO)
Heavyweight (+100 kg)	Kanan Nasibov (AZE)	Jakub Sordyl (POL)	İbrahim Tataroğlu (TUR)

=== Women's events ===
Event	Gold	Silver	Bronze
Extra-lightweight (−48 kg)	Szabina Szeleczki (HUN)	Zuzanna Woźniak (POL)	Giulia Ghiglione (ITA)
Extra-lightweight (−48 kg)	Szabina Szeleczki (HUN)	Zuzanna Woźniak (POL)	Zilan Ertem (TUR)
Half-lightweight (−52 kg)	Pauline Cuq (FRA)	Nikolina Nišavić (SRB)	Lea Beres (FRA)
Half-lightweight (−52 kg)	Pauline Cuq (FRA)	Nikolina Nišavić (SRB)	Alessandra Rocco (ITA)
Lightweight (−57 kg)	Giulia Carnà (ITA)	Alya De Carvalho (FRA)	Nino Loladze (GEO)
Lightweight (−57 kg)	Giulia Carnà (ITA)	Alya De Carvalho (FRA)	Varvara Kuchar (LTU)
Half-middleweight (−63 kg)	Louna-Lumia Seikkula (FIN)	Julie Falgon (FRA)	Anna Kriza (HUN)
Half-middleweight (−63 kg)	Louna-Lumia Seikkula (FIN)	Julie Falgon (FRA)	Sinem Oruç (TUR)
Middleweight (−70 kg)	Ingrid Nilsson (SWE)	Olha Tsimko (UKR)	Taís Pina (POR)
Middleweight (−70 kg)	Ingrid Nilsson (SWE)	Olha Tsimko (UKR)	Kaja Schuster (SLO)
Half-heavyweight (−78 kg)	Julie Zárybnická (CZE)	Jovana Stjepanović (SRB)	Claudia Sperotti (ITA)
Half-heavyweight (−78 kg)	Julie Zárybnická (CZE)	Jovana Stjepanović (SRB)	Lieke Derks (NED)
Heavyweight (+78 kg)	Paulien Sweers (NED)	Roxana Vișa (ROU)	Grace-Esther Mienandi Lahou (FRA)
Heavyweight (+78 kg)	Paulien Sweers (NED)	Roxana Vișa (ROU)	Tiziana Marini (ITA)

=== Mixed ===
Event	Gold	Silver	Bronze
Mixed team	Georgia	France	Ukraine
Mixed team	Georgia	France	Turkey

Source results:

=== Medal table ===
* Host nation (Moldova)

Rank	Nation	Gold	Silver	Bronze	Total
1	Georgia (GEO)	2	2	3	7
2	Azerbaijan (AZE)	2	1	1	4
3	Italy (ITA)	2	0	7	9
4	France (FRA)	1	4	2	7
5	Netherlands (NED)	1	1	1	3
6	Romania (ROU)	1	1	0	2
7	Hungary (HUN)	1	0	1	2
8	Armenia (ARM)	1	0	0	1
8	Czech Republic (CZE)	1	0	0	1
8	Finland (FIN)	1	0	0	1
8	Germany (GER)	1	0	0	1
8	Sweden (SWE)	1	0	0	1
13	Serbia (SRB)	0	2	2	4
14	Poland (POL)	0	2	1	3
15	Ukraine (UKR)	0	1	1	2
16	Moldova (MDA)*	0	1	0	1
17	Turkey (TUR)	0	0	4	4
18	Portugal (POR)	0	0	2	2
19	Austria (AUT)	0	0	1	1
19	Belgium (BEL)	0	0	1	1
19	Lithuania (LTU)	0	0	1	1
19	Slovakia (SVK)	0	0	1	1
19	Slovenia (SLO)	0	0	1	1
Totals (23 entries)		15	15	30	60
