= 2024 European Cadet Judo Championships =

Judo competition

Judo 2024 European Cadet Judo Championships
- Venue: Asics Arena
- Location: Sofia, Bulgaria
- Dates: 27–30 June 2024
- Competitors: 511 from 44 nations

Champions
- Mixed team: France (1st title)

Competition at external databases
- Links: IJF • JudoInside

The 2024 European Cadet Judo Championships was held at the Asics Arena in Sofia, Bulgaria, from 27 to 30 June 2024

== Medal table ==
* Host nation (Bulgaria)

| Rank | Nation | Gold | Silver | Bronze | Total |
|---|---|---|---|---|---|
| – | Individual Neutral Athletes (AIN) | 4 | 4 | 4 | 12 |
| 1 | Poland (POL) | 2 | 2 | 0 | 4 |
| 2 | Serbia (SRB) | 2 | 0 | 2 | 4 |
| 3 | Germany (GER) | 2 | 0 | 1 | 3 |
| 4 | Ukraine (UKR) | 1 | 3 | 3 | 7 |
| 5 | Spain (ESP) | 1 | 2 | 1 | 4 |
| 6 | Azerbaijan (AZE) | 1 | 1 | 2 | 4 |
| 7 | Israel (ISR) | 1 | 0 | 3 | 4 |
| 8 | Estonia (EST) | 1 | 0 | 0 | 1 |
| 8 | Slovakia (SVK) | 1 | 0 | 0 | 1 |
| 10 | France (FRA) | 0 | 2 | 3 | 5 |
| 11 | Georgia (GEO) | 0 | 1 | 1 | 2 |
| 12 | Lithuania (LTU) | 0 | 1 | 0 | 1 |
| 13 | Belgium (BEL) | 0 | 0 | 2 | 2 |
| 13 | Hungary (HUN) | 0 | 0 | 2 | 2 |
| 13 | Latvia (LAT) | 0 | 0 | 2 | 2 |
| 16 | Armenia (ARM) | 0 | 0 | 1 | 1 |
| 16 | Czech Republic (CZE) | 0 | 0 | 1 | 1 |
| 16 | Italy (ITA) | 0 | 0 | 1 | 1 |
| 16 | Netherlands (NED) | 0 | 0 | 1 | 1 |
| 16 | Slovenia (SLO) | 0 | 0 | 1 | 1 |
| 16 | Turkey (TUR) | 0 | 0 | 1 | 1 |
| Totals (21 entries) | | 16 | 16 | 32 | 64 |

== Medal summary ==
=== Men's events ===
| Event | Gold | Silver | Bronze |
|---|---|---|---|
| −50 kg | Bahadir Feyzullayev (AZE) | Rostyslav Kostrykin (UKR) | Michael Eldan (ISR) |
| −50 kg | Bahadir Feyzullayev (AZE) | Rostyslav Kostrykin (UKR) | Mahammadali Husiyev (AZE) |
| −55 kg | Magomed Abdulaev (AIN) | Khazar Heydarov (UKR) | Botond Kunyik (HUN) |
| −55 kg | Magomed Abdulaev (AIN) | Khazar Heydarov (UKR) | Gal Blažič (SLO) |
| −60 kg | Izhak Ashpiz (ISR) | Jakub Kurowski (POL) | Shalev Cohen (ISR) |
| −60 kg | Izhak Ashpiz (ISR) | Jakub Kurowski (POL) | Lyova Srapyan (ARM) |
| −66 kg | Abdullakh Parchiev (AIN) | Giorgi Givishvili (GEO) | Iaroslav Bunakov (AIN) |
| −66 kg | Abdullakh Parchiev (AIN) | Giorgi Givishvili (GEO) | Boris Jankovic (SRB) |
| −73 kg | Bogdan Veličković (SRB) | Timur Davidov (AIN) | Aleksandrs Avdejevs (LAT) |
| −73 kg | Bogdan Veličković (SRB) | Timur Davidov (AIN) | Jasur Ibadli (AZE) |
| −81 kg | Abu-Bakr Kantaev (AIN) | Mykhailo Solianyk (UKR) | Konstantin Distel (GER) |
| −81 kg | Abu-Bakr Kantaev (AIN) | Mykhailo Solianyk (UKR) | Kenzo Cremers (BEL) |
| −90 kg | Dmytro Lebid (UKR) | Majus Genys (LTU) | Gaya Sonntag (FRA) |
| −90 kg | Dmytro Lebid (UKR) | Majus Genys (LTU) | Tomass Manfelds (LAT) |
| +90 kg | Marek-Adrian Mäsak (EST) | Subhan Akhundov (AZE) | Nodar Kobaladze (GEO) |
| +90 kg | Marek-Adrian Mäsak (EST) | Subhan Akhundov (AZE) | Yauheni Morau (AIN) |

Source results:

=== Women's events ===
| Event | Gold | Silver | Bronze |
|---|---|---|---|
| −40 kg | Aiora Martin Carriches (ESP) | Mathilde Aurel (FRA) | Aurora Ferro (ITA) |
| −40 kg | Aiora Martin Carriches (ESP) | Mathilde Aurel (FRA) | Büşra Ceylin Coşkun (TUR) |
| −44 kg | Patrícia Tománková (SVK) | Africa Puente Lopez (ESP) | Natalija Prolić (SRB) |
| −44 kg | Patrícia Tománková (SVK) | Africa Puente Lopez (ESP) | Lena Antoine (BEL) |
| −48 kg | Charlotte Nettesheim (GER) | Barbara Twarowska (POL) | Anastasiia Levchenko (UKR) |
| −48 kg | Charlotte Nettesheim (GER) | Barbara Twarowska (POL) | Sofia Zakharova (AIN) |
| −52 kg | Valeriia Kozlova (AIN) | Mónica Martínez de Rituerto (ESP) | Janka Juttner (HUN) |
| −52 kg | Valeriia Kozlova (AIN) | Mónica Martínez de Rituerto (ESP) | Clarisse Carillon (FRA) |
| −57 kg | Maya Toszegi (GER) | Aleksandra Shestopalova (AIN) | Hili Zakroisky (ISR) |
| −57 kg | Maya Toszegi (GER) | Aleksandra Shestopalova (AIN) | Manon Agati-Alouache (FRA) |
| −63 kg | Amelia Ptasińska (POL) | Viktoriia Martynenko (AIN) | Martina Obrador Gonzalez (ESP) |
| −63 kg | Amelia Ptasińska (POL) | Viktoriia Martynenko (AIN) | Ilariia Tsurkan (UKR) |
| −70 kg | Aleksandra Andrić (SRB) | Zlata Suprunenko (AIN) | Anna Oliinyk-Korniiko (UKR) |
| −70 kg | Aleksandra Andrić (SRB) | Zlata Suprunenko (AIN) | Xanne van Lijf (NED) |
| +70 kg | Zuzanna Banaszewska (POL) | Léonie Minkada-Caquineau (FRA) | Kristýna Kaszperová (CZE) |
| +70 kg | Zuzanna Banaszewska (POL) | Léonie Minkada-Caquineau (FRA) | Anna Petrunina (AIN) |

Source results:

=== Mixed ===
| Event | Gold | Silver | Bronze |
|---|---|---|---|
| Mixed team | France | Turkey | Germany |
| Mixed team | France | Turkey | Poland |

Source results:
