= 2026 World Judo Juniors Championships =

Judo competition

Judo 2026 World Judo Juniors Championships
- Venue: Martial Arts Sports Complex, Olympic Village
- Location: Tashkent, Uzbekistan
- Dates: 19–22 November 2026
- Competitors: 574 from 78 nations
- Total prize money: €99,800

Competition at external databases
- Links: IJF • JudoInside

The 2026 World Judo Juniors Championships were held at the Martial Arts Sports Complex in the Olympic Village in Tashkent, Uzbekistan, from 19 to 22 November 2026 as part of the IJF World Tour. A mixed teams event took place on the competition's last day.

== Medal summary ==
=== Men's events ===
Event	Gold	Silver	Bronze
Extra-lightweight (−60 kg)	Muhammadjon Masharipov (UZB)	Jonathan Yang (USA)	Toai Hashima (JPN)
Extra-lightweight (−60 kg)	Muhammadjon Masharipov (UZB)	Jonathan Yang (USA)	Luka Omanadze (GEO)
Half-lightweight (−66 kg)	Abdullakh Parchiev (RUS)	Tom Simkhaev (ISR)	Tornike Gigauri (GEO)
Half-lightweight (−66 kg)	Abdullakh Parchiev (RUS)	Tom Simkhaev (ISR)	Mahammad Musayev (AZE)
Lightweight (−73 kg)	Pavel Koloverdov (RUS)	Oussama Abdelhak Hezil (ALG)	Youssef Elkassar (EGY)
Lightweight (−73 kg)	Pavel Koloverdov (RUS)	Oussama Abdelhak Hezil (ALG)	Yura Yokoo (JPN)
Half-middleweight (−81 kg)	Iaroslav Bunakov (RUS)	Sadulla Ravshanov (UZB)	Stevan Sadiku (MNE)
Half-middleweight (−81 kg)	Iaroslav Bunakov (RUS)	Sadulla Ravshanov (UZB)	Stanislau Alkhou (BLR)
Middleweight (−90 kg)	Daniiar Melisov (KGZ)	Emir Selim Arı (TUR)	Irakli Kavtarashvili (GEO)
Middleweight (−90 kg)	Daniiar Melisov (KGZ)	Emir Selim Arı (TUR)	Abdula Suleimanov (RUS)
Half-heavyweight (−100 kg)	Sanzhar Yerulanuly (KAZ)	Shokei Hirano (JPN)	Davud Namazli (AZE)
Half-heavyweight (−100 kg)	Sanzhar Yerulanuly (KAZ)	Shokei Hirano (JPN)	Askar Birzhanov (KAZ)
Heavyweight (+100 kg)	İbrahim Tataroğlu (TUR)	Ramazan Ahmadov (AZE)	Marek-Adrian Mäsak (EST)
Heavyweight (+100 kg)	İbrahim Tataroğlu (TUR)	Ramazan Ahmadov (AZE)	Fazliddin Rafikov (UZB)

=== Women's events ===
Event	Gold	Silver	Bronze
Extra-lightweight (−48 kg)	Sofia Zakharova (RUS)	Mona Takehara (JPN)	Maëlys Dapa (BEL)
Extra-lightweight (−48 kg)	Sofia Zakharova (RUS)	Mona Takehara (JPN)	Rin Hatayama (JPN)
Half-lightweight (−52 kg)	Iroha Oi (JPN)	Valeriia Kozlova (RUS)	Barbara Twarowska (POL)
Half-lightweight (−52 kg)	Iroha Oi (JPN)	Valeriia Kozlova (RUS)	Rafaela Rodrigues (BRA)
Lightweight (−57 kg)	Terbishiin Ariunzayaa (MGL)	Zhanar Zholdosheva (KGZ)	Nika Tomc (SLO)
Lightweight (−57 kg)	Terbishiin Ariunzayaa (MGL)	Zhanar Zholdosheva (KGZ)	Clarisse Carillon (FRA)
Half-middleweight (−63 kg)	Manon Agati-Alouache (FRA)	Mashbatyn Tsendbazar (UAE)	Aishat Alieva (RUS)
Half-middleweight (−63 kg)	Manon Agati-Alouache (FRA)	Mashbatyn Tsendbazar (UAE)	Leila Mazouzi (SLO)
Middleweight (−70 kg)	Aleksandra Andrić (SRB)	Andrijana Šutović (MNE)	Aoi Komine (JPN)
Middleweight (−70 kg)	Aleksandra Andrić (SRB)	Andrijana Šutović (MNE)	Charlie Thibault (CAN)
Half-heavyweight (−78 kg)	Tuana Gülenay (TUR)	Kristina Konovalova (RUS)	Kokoro Otawa (JPN)
Half-heavyweight (−78 kg)	Tuana Gülenay (TUR)	Kristina Konovalova (RUS)	Zlata Suprunenko (RUS)
Heavyweight (+78 kg)	Célia Cancan (FRA)	Lee Hyeon-ji (KOR)	Safa Soliman (EGY)
Heavyweight (+78 kg)	Célia Cancan (FRA)	Lee Hyeon-ji (KOR)	Kira Safonova (RUS)

=== Mixed ===
Event	Gold	Silver	Bronze
Mixed team	Japan; Ryusei Arakawa; Shokei Hirano; Tomoka Inoue; Honoka Kimura; Aoi Komine; Kanna Maeda; Iroha Oi; Taichi Okuda; Kokoro Otawa; Haru Shibata; Kaito Tokita; Yura Yokoo	Russia; Abdurakhman Bekeev; Anna Gadomskaia; Karim Iagafarov; Pavel Koloverdov; Denis Kuligin; Daria Kuptsova; Eva Ognivova; Kira Safonova; Abdula Suleimanov; Ademirkan Tambiev; Tatiana Tsvetova; Kseniia Zanozina	Brazil; Alexandre Albano; Hiago Bastos; Sophia Câmara; Dandara Camillo; Silas Costa; Larissa Menezes; Lucas Ribeiro; Rafaela Rodrigues; Ana Soares
Mixed team	Japan; Ryusei Arakawa; Shokei Hirano; Tomoka Inoue; Honoka Kimura; Aoi Komine; Kanna Maeda; Iroha Oi; Taichi Okuda; Kokoro Otawa; Haru Shibata; Kaito Tokita; Yura Yokoo	Russia; Abdurakhman Bekeev; Anna Gadomskaia; Karim Iagafarov; Pavel Koloverdov; Denis Kuligin; Daria Kuptsova; Eva Ognivova; Kira Safonova; Abdula Suleimanov; Ademirkan Tambiev; Tatiana Tsvetova; Kseniia Zanozina	France; Manon Agati-Alouache; Kassim Brosseau; Noah Boue Kossa; Célia Cancan; Clarisse Carillon; Laura Duchaussoy; David Iurcovschi; Alicia Marques; Léonie Minkada-Caquineau; Kévin Nzuzi Diasivi; Kris Oliver Siewe Djiekam; Désir Zoba Casi

=== Medal table ===
* Host nation (Uzbekistan)

Rank	Nation	Gold	Silver	Bronze	Total
1	Russia (RUS)	4	3	4	11
2	Japan (JPN)	2	2	5	9
3	Turkey (TUR)	2	1	0	3
4	France (FRA)	2	0	2	4
5	Uzbekistan (UZB)*	1	1	1	3
6	Kyrgyzstan (KGZ)	1	1	0	2
7	Kazakhstan (KAZ)	1	0	1	2
8	Mongolia (MGL)	1	0	0	1
8	Serbia (SRB)	1	0	0	1
10	Azerbaijan (AZE)	0	1	2	3
11	Montenegro (MNE)	0	1	1	2
12	Algeria (ALG)	0	1	0	1
12	Israel (ISR)	0	1	0	1
12	South Korea (KOR)	0	1	0	1
12	United Arab Emirates (UAE)	0	1	0	1
12	United States (USA)	0	1	0	1
17	Georgia (GEO)	0	0	3	3
18	Brazil (BRA)	0	0	2	2
18	Egypt (EGY)	0	0	2	2
18	Slovenia (SLO)	0	0	2	2
21	Belarus (BLR)	0	0	1	1
21	Belgium (BEL)	0	0	1	1
21	Canada (CAN)	0	0	1	1
21	Estonia (EST)	0	0	1	1
21	Poland (POL)	0	0	1	1
Totals (25 entries)		15	15	30	60

== Prize money ==
The sums written are per medalist, bringing the total prizes awarded to €79,800 for the individual contests and €20,000 for the team competition. (retrieved from:)

Medal	Individual			Mixed team		
Medal	Total	Judoka	Coach	Total	Judoka	Coach
Gold	€2,500	€2,000	€500	€8,000	€6,400	€1,600
Silver	€1,500	€1,200	€300	€5,600	€4,480	€1,120
Bronze	€850	€680	€170	€3,200	€2,560	€640
