= 2023 European U23 Judo Championships =

Judo competition

Judo 2023 European U23 Judo Championships
- Venue: MBS Arena Potsdam
- Location: Potsdam, Germany
- Dates: 17–19 November 2023
- Competitors: 310 from 37 nations

Champions
- Mixed team: Germany (1st title)

Competition at external databases
- Links: IJF • JudoInside

The 2023 European U23 Judo Championships was held in Potsdam, Germany, from 17 to 19 November 2023. The final day of competition featured a mixed team event.

== Medal table ==
* Host nation (Germany)

Rank	Nation	Gold	Silver	Bronze	Total
1	Netherlands (NED)	3	2	2	7
2	Georgia (GEO)	2	2	2	6
3	Ukraine (UKR)	2	2	0	4
4	Germany (GER)*	2	1	2	5
5	Hungary (HUN)	2	0	6	8
6	Italy (ITA)	2	0	1	3
7	Spain (ESP)	1	3	0	4
8	Moldova (MDA)	1	0	1	2
9	Turkey (TUR)	0	1	1	2
10	Belgium (BEL)	0	1	0	1
10	Bulgaria (BUL)	0	1	0	1
10	Great Britain (GBR)	0	1	0	1
10	Latvia (LAT)	0	1	0	1
14	Azerbaijan (AZE)	0	0	5	5
15	Romania (ROU)	0	0	3	3
16	Austria (AUT)	0	0	1	1
16	Croatia (CRO)	0	0	1	1
16	Finland (FIN)	0	0	1	1
16	Kosovo (KOS)	0	0	1	1
16	Poland (POL)	0	0	1	1
16	Portugal (POR)	0	0	1	1
16	Serbia (SRB)	0	0	1	1
Totals (22 entries)		15	15	30	60

== Medal summary ==
=== Men's events ===
Event	Gold	Silver	Bronze
Extra-lightweight (−60 kg)	Nazar Viskov; Ukraine	Luis Barroso López; Spain	Mahammad Musayev; Azerbaijan
Extra-lightweight (−60 kg)	Nazar Viskov; Ukraine	Luis Barroso López; Spain	Márton Andrási; Hungary
Half-lightweight (−66 kg)	Radu Izvoreanu; Moldova	Anthony De Angelis; Latvia	Aydin Rzayev; Azerbaijan
Half-lightweight (−66 kg)	Radu Izvoreanu; Moldova	Anthony De Angelis; Latvia	Francesco Cargnelutti; Italy
Lightweight (−73 kg)	Koen Heg; Netherlands	Ejder Toktay; Turkey	Nariman Mirzayev; Azerbaijan
Lightweight (−73 kg)	Koen Heg; Netherlands	Ejder Toktay; Turkey	Kote Kapanadze; Georgia
Half-middleweight (−81 kg)	Zaur Dvalashvili; Georgia	Jarne Duyck; Belgium	Magerram Imamverdiev; Azerbaijan
Half-middleweight (−81 kg)	Zaur Dvalashvili; Georgia	Jarne Duyck; Belgium	Eetu Ihanamäki; Finland
Middleweight (−90 kg)	Péter Sáfrány; Hungary	Nikita Yudanov; Ukraine	Gergely Nerpel; Hungary
Middleweight (−90 kg)	Péter Sáfrány; Hungary	Nikita Yudanov; Ukraine	Alex Creţ; Romania
Half-heavyweight (−100 kg)	Daniele Accogli; Italy	Oliver Barratt; Great Britain	Lars Vissers; Netherlands
Half-heavyweight (−100 kg)	Daniele Accogli; Italy	Oliver Barratt; Great Britain	Kilian Kappelmeier; Germany
Heavyweight (+100 kg)	Saba Inaneishvili; Georgia	Irakli Demetrashvili; Georgia	Igor Vračar; Serbia
Heavyweight (+100 kg)	Saba Inaneishvili; Georgia	Irakli Demetrashvili; Georgia	Darius Georgescu; Romania

=== Women's events ===
Event	Gold	Silver	Bronze
Extra-lightweight (−48 kg)	Vera Wandel; Netherlands	Gema Gómez; Spain	Merve Azak; Turkey
Extra-lightweight (−48 kg)	Vera Wandel; Netherlands	Gema Gómez; Spain	Rebeka Kőszegi; Hungary
Half-lightweight (−52 kg)	Róza Gyertyás; Hungary	Gabriela Dimitrova; Bulgaria	Aydan Valiyeva; Azerbaijan
Half-lightweight (−52 kg)	Róza Gyertyás; Hungary	Gabriela Dimitrova; Bulgaria	Ana Viktorija Puljiz; Croatia
Lightweight (−57 kg)	Elin Henninger; Netherlands	Nino Loladze; Georgia	Lisa Grabner; Austria
Lightweight (−57 kg)	Elin Henninger; Netherlands	Nino Loladze; Georgia	Fatjona Kasapi; Kosovo
Half-middleweight (−63 kg)	Laura Vázquez; Spain	Aitana Fernández Herrera; Spain	Brigitta Varga; Hungary
Half-middleweight (−63 kg)	Laura Vázquez; Spain	Aitana Fernández Herrera; Spain	Amanda Zuaznabar-Torres; Romania
Middleweight (−70 kg)	Samira Bock; Germany	Anna Oliinyk-Korniiko; Ukraine	Tais Pina; Portugal
Middleweight (−70 kg)	Samira Bock; Germany	Anna Oliinyk-Korniiko; Ukraine	Friederike Stolze; Germany
Half-heavyweight (−78 kg)	Yuliia Kurchenko; Ukraine	Raffaela Igl; Germany	Yael van Heemst; Netherlands
Half-heavyweight (−78 kg)	Yuliia Kurchenko; Ukraine	Raffaela Igl; Germany	Nikolett Sági; Hungary
Heavyweight (+78 kg)	Erica Simonetti; Italy	Carmen Dijkstra; Netherlands	Oxana Diacenco; Moldova
Heavyweight (+78 kg)	Erica Simonetti; Italy	Carmen Dijkstra; Netherlands	Kinga Wolszczak; Poland

=== Mixed ===
Event	Gold	Silver	Bronze
Mixed team	Germany	Netherlands	Hungary
Mixed team	Germany	Netherlands	Georgia

Source results:
