= 2014 European Junior Judo Championships =

Judo competition

Judo 2014 European Junior Judo Championships
- Venue: Polyvalent Hall
- Location: Bucharest, Romania
- Dates: 19–21 September 2014
- Competitors: 409 from 40 nations

Champions
- Men's team: Georgia
- Women's team: Croatia

Competition at external databases
- Links: IJF • JudoInside

The 2014 European Junior Judo Championships is an edition of the European Junior Judo Championships, organised by the European Judo Union. It was held at Polyvalent Hall, in Bucharest, Romania from 19 to 21 September 2014. The final day of competition featured team events, with team Georgia winning the men's event and team Croatia the women's.

== Medal summary ==
=== Medal table ===
* Host nation (Romania)

Rank	Nation	Gold	Silver	Bronze	Total
1	Italy (ITA)	2	1	1	4
2	Ukraine (UKR)	2	0	3	5
3	Georgia (GEO)	1	3	1	5
4	Russia (RUS)	1	2	4	7
5	Netherlands (NED)	1	2	2	5
6	France (FRA)	1	1	7	9
7	Turkey (TUR)	1	1	2	4
8	Poland (POL)	1	1	0	2
9	Hungary (HUN)	1	0	1	2
9	Israel (ISR)	1	0	1	2
9	Serbia (SRB)	1	0	1	2
9	Spain (ESP)	1	0	1	2
13	Bulgaria (BUL)	1	0	0	1
13	Great Britain (GBR)	1	0	0	1
15	Germany (GER)	0	1	3	4
16	Croatia (CRO)	0	1	1	2
16	Romania (ROU)*	0	1	1	2
18	Armenia (ARM)	0	1	0	1
18	Azerbaijan (AZE)	0	1	0	1
20	Bosnia and Herzegovina (BIH)	0	0	1	1
20	Greece (GRE)	0	0	1	1
20	Slovenia (SLO)	0	0	1	1
Totals (22 entries)		16	16	32	64

=== Men's events ===
Event	Gold	Silver	Bronze
−55 kg	Angelo Pantano (ITA)	Tornike Nagliashvili (GEO)	Kamal Fikri (FRA)
−55 kg	Angelo Pantano (ITA)	Tornike Nagliashvili (GEO)	Magomed Solomgeriev (RUS)
−60 kg	Francisco Garrigós (ESP)	Ivane Javakhishvili (GEO)	Fabio Basile (ITA)
−60 kg	Francisco Garrigós (ESP)	Ivane Javakhishvili (GEO)	Walide Khyar (FRA)
−66 kg	Baruch Shmailov (ISR)	Arsen Ghazaryan (ARM)	Dmytro Raskin (UKR)
−66 kg	Baruch Shmailov (ISR)	Arsen Ghazaryan (ARM)	Martin Setz (GER)
−73 kg	Benjamin Axus (FRA)	Thierno Balde (NED)	Tohar Butbul (ISR)
−73 kg	Benjamin Axus (FRA)	Thierno Balde (NED)	Alexandru Raicu (ROU)
−81 kg	Nemanja Majdov (SRB)	Ushangi Margiani (GEO)	Levan Gugava (GEO)
−81 kg	Nemanja Majdov (SRB)	Ushangi Margiani (GEO)	Stefan Majdov (SRB)
−90 kg	Beka Gviniashvili (GEO)	Firudin Dadashov (AZE)	Max de Vreeze (NED)
−90 kg	Beka Gviniashvili (GEO)	Firudin Dadashov (AZE)	Nikoloz Sherazadishvili (ESP)
−100 kg	Niyaz Ilyasov (RUS)	Ramazan Malsuigenov (RUS)	Philipp Galandi (GER)
−100 kg	Niyaz Ilyasov (RUS)	Ramazan Malsuigenov (RUS)	Zlatko Kumrić (CRO)
+100 kg	Iakiv Khammo (UKR)	Ruslan Shakhbazov (RUS)	Tamerlan Bashaev (RUS)
+100 kg	Iakiv Khammo (UKR)	Ruslan Shakhbazov (RUS)	Sergii Zvieriev (UKR)
Team	Georgia	Ukraine	France
Team	Georgia	Ukraine	Germany

=== Women's events ===
Event	Gold	Silver	Bronze
−44 kg	Borislava Damyanova (BUL)	Melisa Çakmaklı (TUR)	Nesrin Kartal Cetin (TUR)
−44 kg	Borislava Damyanova (BUL)	Melisa Çakmaklı (TUR)	Miriam Schneider (GER)
−48 kg	Dilara Lokmanhekim (TUR)	Alexandra Pop (ROU)	Réka Pupp (HUN)
−48 kg	Dilara Lokmanhekim (TUR)	Alexandra Pop (ROU)	Gülkader Şentürk (TUR)
−52 kg	Odette Giuffrida (ITA)	Astride Gneto (FRA)	Zarina Babinyan (RUS)
−52 kg	Odette Giuffrida (ITA)	Astride Gneto (FRA)	Andreja Leški (SLO)
−57 kg	Anna Kuczera (POL)	Maria Centracchio (ITA)	Sarah Harachi (FRA)
−57 kg	Anna Kuczera (POL)	Maria Centracchio (ITA)	Dewy Karthaus (NED)
−63 kg	Szabina Gercsák (HUN)	Do Velema (NED)	Diana Dzhigaros (RUS)
−63 kg	Szabina Gercsák (HUN)	Do Velema (NED)	Elisavet Teltsidou (GRE)
−70 kg	Sanne van Dijke (NED)	Barbara Matić (CRO)	Mélissa Héleine (FRA)
−70 kg	Sanne van Dijke (NED)	Barbara Matić (CRO)	Aleksandra Samardzic (BIH)
−78 kg	Anastasiya Turchyn (UKR)	Beata Pacut (POL)	Sama Hawa Camara (FRA)
−78 kg	Anastasiya Turchyn (UKR)	Beata Pacut (POL)	Julie Pierret (FRA)
+78 kg	Jodie Myers (GBR)	Michelle Goschin (GER)	Marine Erb (FRA)
+78 kg	Jodie Myers (GBR)	Michelle Goschin (GER)	Anastasiia Komovych (UKR)
Team	Croatia	France	Russia
Team	Croatia	France	Italy

Source Results
