= Brigita Matić-Ljuba =

Croatian judoka (born 1996)

Personal information
- Born: 31 January 1996 (age 30)
- Occupation: Judoka

Sport
- Country: Croatia
- Sport: Judo
- Weight class: –78 kg

Achievements and titles
- European Champ.: R16 (2016)
Medal record
Women's judo
Representing Croatia
IJF Grand Prix
Silver medal – second place	2016 Ulaanbaatar	–78 kg
Bronze medal – third place	2014 Tbilisi	–78 kg
European U23 Championships
Silver medal – second place	2015 Bratislava	–78 kg
World Juniors Championships
Gold medal – first place	2015 Abu Dhabi	–78 kg
Bronze medal – third place	2013 Ljubljana	–78 kg
European Junior Championships
Silver medal – second place	2012 Poreč	–78 kg
Silver medal – second place	2015 Oberwart	–78 kg
Silver medal – second place	2016 Málaga	–78 kg
World Cadets Championships
Bronze medal – third place	2013 Miami	–70 kg
European Cadet Championships
Gold medal – first place	2012 Bar	–70 kg
Bronze medal – third place	2011 Cottonera	–70 kg
Bronze medal – third place	2013 Tallinn	–70 kg
Youth Olympic Games
Gold medal – first place	2014 Nanjing	–78 kg

Profile at external databases
- IJF: 8118
- JudoInside.com: 62036
- Updated on 15 June 2022

Brigita Matić-Ljuba (born 31 January 1996) is a Croatian judoka who competes in international judo competitions. She is the 2014 Youth Olympic champion, a World Junior champion, two-time European Cadet champion and a three-time European Junior silver medalist. She is the younger sister of Barbara Matić.
