= 2018 European U23 Judo Championships =

Judo 2018 European U23 Judo Championships
- Venue: Audi Aréna
- Location: Győr, Hungary
- Dates: 2–4 November 2018
- Competitors: 296 from 37 nations

Competition at external databases
- Links: IJF • JudoInside

The 2018 European U23 Judo Championships were the edition of the European U23 Judo Championships, organised by the European Judo Union. It was held in Győr, Hungary from 2–4 November 2018.

== Medal overview ==
=== Men ===
Event	Gold	Silver	Bronze
Extra-lightweight (−60 kg)	Yago Abuladze (RUS)	Jaba Papinashvili (GEO)	Ivan Dolgikh (RUS)
Extra-lightweight (−60 kg)	Yago Abuladze (RUS)	Jaba Papinashvili (GEO)	Rashad Yelkiyev (AZE)
Half-lightweight (−66 kg)	Alberto Gaitero Martin (ESP)	Mirzoyusuf Gafurov (RUS)	Petar Zadro (BIH)
Half-lightweight (−66 kg)	Alberto Gaitero Martin (ESP)	Mirzoyusuf Gafurov (RUS)	Yarin Menaged (ISR)
Lightweight (−73 kg)	Akil Gjakova (KOS)	Rufat Mammadov (AZE)	Marcel Cercea (ROU)
Lightweight (−73 kg)	Akil Gjakova (KOS)	Rufat Mammadov (AZE)	Gabriele Sulli (ITA)
Half-middleweight (−81 kg)	Vladimir Akhalkatsi (GEO)	Tamazi Kirakozashvili (GEO)	Timo Cavelius (GER)
Half-middleweight (−81 kg)	Vladimir Akhalkatsi (GEO)	Tamazi Kirakozashvili (GEO)	Tim Gramkow (GER)
Middleweight (−90 kg)	Mattias Kuusik (EST)	Jamal Petgrave (GBR)	Viktar Kliavusau (BLR)
Middleweight (−90 kg)	Mattias Kuusik (EST)	Jamal Petgrave (GBR)	Bas Van Empelen (NED)
Half-heavyweight (−100 kg)	Arman Adamian (RUS)	Domenik Schoenefeldt (GER)	Oleksiy Lysenko (UKR)
Half-heavyweight (−100 kg)	Arman Adamian (RUS)	Domenik Schoenefeldt (GER)	Onise Saneblidze (GEO)
Heavyweight (+100 kg)	Ruslan Shakhbazov (RUS)	Stephan Hegyi (AUT)	Fedir Panko (UKR)
Heavyweight (+100 kg)	Ruslan Shakhbazov (RUS)	Stephan Hegyi (AUT)	Yahor Kukharenka (BLR)

=== Women ===
Event	Gold	Silver	Bronze
Extra-lightweight (−48 kg)	Andrea Stojadinov (SRB)	Daria Pichkaleva (RUS)	Tamar Malca (ISR)
Extra-lightweight (−48 kg)	Andrea Stojadinov (SRB)	Daria Pichkaleva (RUS)	Mireia Lapuerta Comas (ESP)
Half-lightweight (−52 kg)	Betina Temelkova (ISR)	Réka Pupp (HUN)	Tatiana Plotnikova (RUS)
Half-lightweight (−52 kg)	Betina Temelkova (ISR)	Réka Pupp (HUN)	Giulia Pierucci (ITA)
Lightweight (−57 kg)	Julia Kowalczyk (POL)	Lele Nairne (GBR)	Eteri Liparteliani (GEO)
Lightweight (−57 kg)	Julia Kowalczyk (POL)	Lele Nairne (GBR)	Viktoriia Baidak (RUS)
Half-middleweight (−63 kg)	Lubjana Piovesana (GBR)	Renata Zachová (CZE)	Inbal Shemesh (ISR)
Half-middleweight (−63 kg)	Lubjana Piovesana (GBR)	Renata Zachová (CZE)	Michelle Hürzeler (GER)
Middleweight (−70 kg)	Michaela Polleres (AUT)	Sara Rodriguez (ESP)	Madina Taimazova (RUS)
Middleweight (−70 kg)	Michaela Polleres (AUT)	Sara Rodriguez (ESP)	Szabina Gercsák (HUN)
Half-heavyweight (−78 kg)	Loriana Kuka (KOS)	Christina Faber (GER)	Giorgia Stangherlin (ITA)
Half-heavyweight (−78 kg)	Loriana Kuka (KOS)	Christina Faber (GER)	Darya Kantsavaya (BLR)
Heavyweight (+78 kg)	Eleonora Geri (ITA)	Sebile Akbulut (TUR)	Raz Hershko (ISR)
Heavyweight (+78 kg)	Eleonora Geri (ITA)	Sebile Akbulut (TUR)	Emese Kárpati (HUN)

=== Medal table ===
* Host nation (Hungary)

Rank	Nation	Gold	Silver	Bronze	Total
1	Russia (RUS)	3	2	4	9
2	Kosovo (KOS)	2	0	0	2
3	Georgia (GEO)	1	2	2	5
4	Great Britain (GBR)	1	2	0	3
5	Spain (ESP)	1	1	1	3
6	Austria (AUT)	1	1	0	2
7	Israel (ISR)	1	0	4	5
8	Italy (ITA)	1	0	3	4
9	Poland (POL)	1	0	1	2
10	Estonia (EST)	1	0	0	1
10	Serbia (SRB)	1	0	0	1
12	Germany (GER)	0	2	3	5
13	Hungary (HUN)*	0	1	2	3
14	Azerbaijan (AZE)	0	1	1	2
15	Czech Republic (CZE)	0	1	0	1
15	Turkey (TUR)	0	1	0	1
17	Belarus (BLR)	0	0	3	3
18	Bosnia and Herzegovina (BIH)	0	0	1	1
18	Netherlands (NED)	0	0	1	1
18	Romania (ROU)	0	0	1	1
18	Ukraine (UKR)	0	0	1	1
Totals (21 entries)		14	14	28	56

== Participating nations ==
There was a total of 296 participants from 37 nations.

- Armenia (1)
- Austria (11)
- Azerbaijan (12)
- Belarus (6)
- Belgium (7)
- Bosnia and Herzegovina (5)
- Bulgaria (5)
- Croatia (10)
- Cyprus (5)
- Czech Republic (4)
- Denmark (2)
- Estonia (2)
- Finland (6)
- Georgia (11)
- Germany (13)
- Great Britain (10)
- Hungary (18)
- Israel (16)
- Italy (15)
- Kosovo (6)
- Latvia (1)
- Macedonia (2)
- Moldova (4)
- Montenegro (1)
- Netherlands (8)
- Norway (1)
- Poland (9)
- Portugal (3)
- Romania (16)
- Russia (17)
- Serbia (13)
- Slovakia (3)
- Slovenia (8)
- Spain (18)
- Switzerland (5)
- Turkey (10)
- Ukraine (12)
