= Judo at the 2014 Summer Youth Olympics – Girls' 78 kg =

Judo competition

Girls' 78 kg at the II Summer Youth Olympic Games
- Venue: Longjiang Gymnasium
- Date: 19 August
- Competitors: 10 from 10 nations

Medalists
1st place, gold medalist(s)		Brigita Matić	Croatia
2nd place, silver medalist(s)		Aleksandra Samardžić	Bosnia and Herzegovina
3rd place, bronze medalist(s)		Elvismar Rodríguez	Venezuela
3rd place, bronze medalist(s)		Sara Rodríguez	Spain

The Girls' 78 kg tournament in Judo at the 2014 Summer Youth Olympics was held on 19 August at the Longjiang Gymnasium.

This event was the heaviest of the girl's judo weight classes, limiting competitors to a maximum of 78 kilograms of body mass. The tournament bracket consisted of a single-elimination contest culminating in a gold medal match. There was also a repechage to determine the winners of the two bronze medals. Each judoka who had lost before the finals competed in the repechage with the two finalists getting bronze medals.

== Results ==
=== Main Bracket ===
Round of 16
Naomi de Bruine (AUS)	000
Wang Yu-jyun (TPE)	000
Kamila Pasternak (POL)	000
Elvismar Rodríguez (VEN)	110

Quarterfinals
Morgane Duchene (FRA)	100
Naomi de Bruine (AUS)	000
Sara Rodríguez (ESP)	000
Aleksandra Samardžić (BIH)	000
Sophie Berger (BEL)	000
Unelle Snyman (RSA)	010
Brigita Matić (CRO)	001
Elvismar Rodríguez (VEN)	000

Semifinals
Morgane Duchene (FRA)	000
Aleksandra Samardžić (BIH)	100
Unelle Snyman (RSA)	000
Brigita Matić (CRO)	100

Finals
Aleksandra Samardžić (BIH)	000
Brigita Matić (CRO)	000

=== Repechage ===
Repechage 1
Bye
Wang Yu-jyun (TPE)
Bye
Kamila Pasternak (POL)

Repechage 2
Wang Yu-jyun (TPE)	000
Sara Rodríguez (ESP)	100
Bye
Naomi de Bruine (AUS)
Bye
Elvismar Rodríguez (VEN)
Kamila Pasternak (POL)	100
Sophie Berger (BEL)	000

Repechage 3
Sara Rodríguez (ESP)	010
Naomi de Bruine (AUS)	000
Elvismar Rodríguez (VEN)	100
Kamila Pasternak (POL)	000

Bronze Medal Finals
Sara Rodríguez (ESP)	000
Unelle Snyman (RSA)	000
Elvismar Rodríguez (VEN)	100
Morgane Duchene (FRA)	001
