= 2024 World Judo Juniors Championships =

Judo competition

Judo 2024 World Judo Juniors Championships
- Venue: Kasri Tennis
- Location: Dushanbe, Tajikistan
- Dates: 2–6 October 2024
- Competitors: 531 from 67 nations
- Total prize money: €99,800

Champions
- Mixed team: Japan (6th title)

Competition at external databases
- Links: IJF • JudoInside

The 2024 World Judo Juniors Championships was held at the Kasri Tennis arena in Dushanbe, Tajikistan, from 2 to 6 October 2024 as part of the IJF World Tour. The mixed teams event took place on the competition's last day.

== Medal summary ==
=== Men's events ===
Event	Gold	Silver	Bronze
Extra-lightweight (−60 kg)	Yamato Fukuda (JPN)	Loiq Kudbudinov (TJK)	Murodil Murodillaev (UZB)
Extra-lightweight (−60 kg)	Yamato Fukuda (JPN)	Loiq Kudbudinov (TJK)	Talgat Orynbassar (KAZ)
Half-lightweight (−66 kg)	Shuntaro Fukuchi (JPN)	Kairi Kentoku (JPN)	German Kobets (IJF)
Half-lightweight (−66 kg)	Shuntaro Fukuchi (JPN)	Kairi Kentoku (JPN)	Alessio De Luca (ITA)
Lightweight (−73 kg)	Keito Kihara (JPN)	Yusuke Takeichi (JPN)	Muhiddin Asadulloev (TJK)
Lightweight (−73 kg)	Keito Kihara (JPN)	Yusuke Takeichi (JPN)	Mardon Ravshanov (UZB)
Half-middleweight (−81 kg)	Luka Javakhishvili (GEO)	Wang Jiangnan (CHN)	Azat Kumisbay (KAZ)
Half-middleweight (−81 kg)	Luka Javakhishvili (GEO)	Wang Jiangnan (CHN)	Suleyman Shukurov (AZE)
Middleweight (−90 kg)	Komei Kawabata (JPN)	Egor Malkin (IJF)	Vadim Ghimbovschi (MDA)
Middleweight (−90 kg)	Komei Kawabata (JPN)	Egor Malkin (IJF)	Alisher Samanov (UZB)
Half-heavyweight (−100 kg)	Mukhammadsodik Sodikov (UZB)	Nozomu Miki (JPN)	Fares Mekhoukh (FRA)
Half-heavyweight (−100 kg)	Mukhammadsodik Sodikov (UZB)	Nozomu Miki (JPN)	Azhdar Baghirov (AZE)
Heavyweight (+100 kg)	Denis Batchaev (IJF)	Kanan Nasibov (AZE)	İbrahim Tataroğlu (TUR)
Heavyweight (+100 kg)	Denis Batchaev (IJF)	Kanan Nasibov (AZE)	Saba Kardava (GEO)

Source results:

=== Women's events ===
Event	Gold	Silver	Bronze
Extra-lightweight (−48 kg)	Hui Xinran (CHN)	Sachiyo Yoshino (JPN)	Kristina Dudina (IJF)
Extra-lightweight (−48 kg)	Hui Xinran (CHN)	Sachiyo Yoshino (JPN)	Clarice Ribeiro (BRA)
Half-lightweight (−52 kg)	Iroha Oi (JPN)	Senju Nosho (JPN)	Alyssia Poulange (FRA)
Half-lightweight (−52 kg)	Iroha Oi (JPN)	Senju Nosho (JPN)	Mio Huh (KOR)
Lightweight (−57 kg)	Riko Honda (JPN)	Tao Yuying (CHN)	Bianca Reis (BRA)
Lightweight (−57 kg)	Riko Honda (JPN)	Tao Yuying (CHN)	Karolina Siennicka (POL)
Half-middleweight (−63 kg)	Melkia Auchecorne (FRA)	Savita Russo (ITA)	Anna Skalská (CZE)
Half-middleweight (−63 kg)	Melkia Auchecorne (FRA)	Savita Russo (ITA)	So Morichika (JPN)
Middleweight (−70 kg)	Elena Dengg (AUT)	April Lynn Fohouo (SUI)	Tayla Grauer (GER)
Middleweight (−70 kg)	Elena Dengg (AUT)	April Lynn Fohouo (SUI)	Kaja Schuster (SLO)
Half-heavyweight (−78 kg)	Brenda Olaya (COL)	Mathilda Sophie Niemeyer (GER)	Eva Ronja Buddenkotte (GER)
Half-heavyweight (−78 kg)	Brenda Olaya (COL)	Mathilda Sophie Niemeyer (GER)	Dandara Camilo (BRA)
Heavyweight (+78 kg)	Lee Hyeon-ji (KOR)	Célia Cancan (FRA)	Chihiro Yamaguchi (JPN)
Heavyweight (+78 kg)	Lee Hyeon-ji (KOR)	Célia Cancan (FRA)	Safa Soliman (EGY)

Source results:

=== Mixed ===
Event	Gold	Silver	Bronze
Mixed team	Japan	France	South Korea
Mixed team	Japan	France	Uzbekistan

Source results:

=== Medal table ===
* Host nation (Tajikistan)

Rank	Nation	Gold	Silver	Bronze	Total
1	Japan (JPN)	7	5	2	14
2	France (FRA)	1	2	2	5
3	China (CHN)	1	2	0	3
–	International Judo Federation (IJF)	1	1	2	4
4	Uzbekistan (UZB)	1	0	4	5
5	South Korea (KOR)	1	0	2	3
6	Georgia (GEO)	1	0	1	2
7	Austria (AUT)	1	0	0	1
7	Colombia (COL)	1	0	0	1
9	Azerbaijan (AZE)	0	1	2	3
9	Germany (GER)	0	1	2	3
11	Italy (ITA)	0	1	1	2
11	Tajikistan (TJK)*	0	1	1	2
13	Switzerland (SUI)	0	1	0	1
14	Brazil (BRA)	0	0	3	3
15	Kazakhstan (KAZ)	0	0	2	2
16	Czech Republic (CZE)	0	0	1	1
16	Egypt (EGY)	0	0	1	1
16	Moldova (MDA)	0	0	1	1
16	Poland (POL)	0	0	1	1
16	Slovenia (SLO)	0	0	1	1
16	Turkey (TUR)	0	0	1	1
Totals (21 entries)		15	15	30	60

== Prize money ==
The sums written are per medalist, bringing the total prizes awarded to €79,800 for the individual contests and €20,000 for the team competition. (retrieved from:)

Medal	Individual			Mixed team		
Medal	Total	Judoka	Coach	Total	Judoka	Coach
Gold	€2,500	€2,000	€500	€8,000	€6,400	€1,600
Silver	€1,500	€1,200	€300	€5,600	€4,480	€1,120
Bronze	€850	€680	€170	€3,200	€2,560	€640
