= 2013 World Judo Cadets Championships =

Judo competition

Judo 2013 World Judo Cadets Championships
- Venue: Trump National Doral Miami
- Location: Miami, United States
- Dates: 8–11 August 2013
- Competitors: 603 from 94 nations

Competition at external databases
- Links: IJF • EJU • JudoInside

The 2013 World Judo Cadets Championships is an edition of the World Judo Cadets Championships, organised by the International Judo Federation. It was held in Miami, United States from 8 to 11 August 2013.

== Medal summary ==
=== Medal table ===
* Host nation (United States)

Rank	Nation	Gold	Silver	Bronze	Total
1	Japan (JPN)	5	3	3	11
2	Russia (RUS)	2	1	6	9
3	Canada (CAN)	2	0	0	2
4	Georgia (GEO)	1	3	0	4
5	France (FRA)	1	2	2	5
6	Azerbaijan (AZE)	1	1	0	2
6	Hungary (HUN)	1	1	0	2
8	Kazakhstan (KAZ)	1	0	1	2
9	Cuba (CUB)	1	0	0	1
9	Germany (GER)	1	0	0	1
11	Netherlands (NED)	0	1	2	3
12	Ukraine (UKR)	0	1	1	2
13	Bosnia and Herzegovina (BIH)	0	1	0	1
13	Italy (ITA)	0	1	0	1
13	South Korea (KOR)	0	1	0	1
16	Belgium (BEL)	0	0	2	2
16	Brazil (BRA)	0	0	2	2
16	Bulgaria (BUL)	0	0	2	2
16	Great Britain (GBR)	0	0	2	2
16	Mongolia (MGL)	0	0	2	2
21	Austria (AUT)	0	0	1	1
21	Belarus (BLR)	0	0	1	1
21	Croatia (CRO)	0	0	1	1
21	Iran (IRI)	0	0	1	1
21	Montenegro (MNE)	0	0	1	1
21	Slovenia (SLO)	0	0	1	1
21	Spain (ESP)	0	0	1	1
Totals (27 entries)		16	16	32	64

=== Men's events ===
Event	Gold	Silver	Bronze
−50 kg	Natig Gurbanli (AZE)	Robinzon Beglarashvili (GEO)	Amartuvshin Bayaraa (MGL)
−50 kg	Natig Gurbanli (AZE)	Robinzon Beglarashvili (GEO)	Jorre Verstraeten (BEL)
−55 kg	Bauyrzhan Zhauyntayev (KAZ)	Elios Manzi (ITA)	Tornike Tsjakadoea (NED)
−55 kg	Bauyrzhan Zhauyntayev (KAZ)	Elios Manzi (ITA)	Peter Miles (GBR)
−60 kg	Takumi Oshima (JPN)	Bogdan Iadov (UKR)	Dzmitry Minkou (BLR)
−60 kg	Takumi Oshima (JPN)	Bogdan Iadov (UKR)	Tsend-Ochiryn Tsogtbaatar (MGL)
−66 kg	Koba Mchedlishvili (GEO)	Hifumi Abe (JPN)	Pavel Ershov (RUS)
−66 kg	Koba Mchedlishvili (GEO)	Hifumi Abe (JPN)	Didar Khamza (KAZ)
−73 kg	Zaur Ramazanov (RUS)	Tamazi Kirakozashvili (GEO)	Ruslan Godizov (RUS)
−73 kg	Zaur Ramazanov (RUS)	Tamazi Kirakozashvili (GEO)	Arso Milic (MNE)
−81 kg	Louis Krieber Gagnon (CAN)	Frank de Wit (NED)	Marko Bubanja (AUT)
−81 kg	Louis Krieber Gagnon (CAN)	Frank de Wit (NED)	Mikhail Igolnikov (RUS)
−90 kg	Karlen Palyan (RUS)	Shota Vaniev (RUS)	Ramin Safaviyeh (IRI)
−90 kg	Karlen Palyan (RUS)	Shota Vaniev (RUS)	Yoshiaki Shirakawa (JPN)
+90 kg	Hyoga Ota (JPN)	Harun Sadikovic (BIH)	Messie Katanga (FRA)
+90 kg	Hyoga Ota (JPN)	Harun Sadikovic (BIH)	Ruslan Shakhbazov (RUS)

=== Women's events ===
Event	Gold	Silver	Bronze
−40 kg	Honoka Yamauchi (JPN)	Leyla Aliyeva (AZE)	Tsvetelina Tsvetanova (BUL)
−40 kg	Honoka Yamauchi (JPN)	Leyla Aliyeva (AZE)	Juliana Rodrigues (BRA)
−44 kg	Mari Suzuki (JPN)	Kincső Mihalovits (HUN)	Anastasiya Turcheva (RUS)
−44 kg	Mari Suzuki (JPN)	Kincső Mihalovits (HUN)	Maruša Štangar (SLO)
−48 kg	Mikoto Tsunemi (JPN)	Lee Hye-kyeong (KOR)	Kristina Shilova (RUS)
−48 kg	Mikoto Tsunemi (JPN)	Lee Hye-kyeong (KOR)	Betina Temelkova (BUL)
−52 kg	Jessica Klimkait (CAN)	Mariam Janashvili (GEO)	Layana Colman (BRA)
−52 kg	Jessica Klimkait (CAN)	Mariam Janashvili (GEO)	Chishima Maeda (JPN)
−57 kg	Jennifer Schwille (GER)	Kanna Murakami (JPN)	Sarah Harachi (FRA)
−57 kg	Jennifer Schwille (GER)	Kanna Murakami (JPN)	Rina Tatsukawa (JPN)
−63 kg	Szabina Gercsák (HUN)	Ines Prevot (FRA)	Lisa Müllenberg (NED)
−63 kg	Szabina Gercsák (HUN)	Ines Prevot (FRA)	Lubjana Piovesana (GBR)
−70 kg	Marie-Ève Gahié (FRA)	Mako Enda (JPN)	Sophie Berger (BEL)
−70 kg	Marie-Ève Gahié (FRA)	Mako Enda (JPN)	Brigita Matić-Ljuba (CRO)
+70 kg	Gusmary Garcia Savigne (CUB)	Morgane Duchene (FRA)	Vasylyna Kyrychenko (UKR)
+70 kg	Gusmary Garcia Savigne (CUB)	Morgane Duchene (FRA)	Sara Rodriguez (ESP)

Source Results
