= 2012 European Cadet Judo Championships =

Judo competition

Judo 2012 European Cadet Judo Championships
- Venue: Stadion Topolica
- Location: Bar, Montenegro
- Dates: 22–24 June 2012

Competition at external databases
- Links: JudoInside

The 2012 European Cadet Judo Championships is an edition of the European Cadet Judo Championships, organised by the International Judo Federation. It was held in Bar, Montenegro from 22 to 24 June 2012.

== Medal summary ==
=== Medal table ===
* Host nation (Montenegro)

Rank	Nation	Gold	Silver	Bronze	Total
1	Russia (RUS)	3	3	5	11
2	Georgia (GEO)	2	2	2	6
3	Germany (GER)	2	1	2	5
4	Ukraine (UKR)	1	3	0	4
5	Azerbaijan (AZE)	1	0	3	4
6	Italy (ITA)	1	0	2	3
7	Bulgaria (BUL)	1	0	1	2
7	Netherlands (NED)	1	0	1	2
7	Poland (POL)	1	0	1	2
7	Romania (ROU)	1	0	1	2
7	Serbia (SRB)	1	0	1	2
12	Croatia (CRO)	1	0	0	1
13	Bosnia and Herzegovina (BIH)	0	2	0	2
14	France (FRA)	0	1	4	5
15	Austria (AUT)	0	1	0	1
15	Belarus (BLR)	0	1	0	1
15	Belgium (BEL)	0	1	0	1
15	Turkey (TUR)	0	1	0	1
19	Hungary (HUN)	0	0	4	4
20	Slovenia (SLO)	0	0	2	2
21	Armenia (ARM)	0	0	1	1
21	Lithuania (LTU)	0	0	1	1
21	Montenegro (MNE)*	0	0	1	1
Totals (23 entries)		16	16	32	64

=== Men's events ===
Event	Gold	Silver	Bronze
−50 kg	Erekle Arkhozashvili (GEO)	Moritz Plafky (GER)	Elnur Abbasov (AZE)
−50 kg	Erekle Arkhozashvili (GEO)	Moritz Plafky (GER)	Sadiq Gurbanov (AZE)
−55 kg	Ilkin Babazada (AZE)	Beka Natatralashvili (GEO)	Harutyun Dermishyan (ARM)
−55 kg	Ilkin Babazada (AZE)	Beka Natatralashvili (GEO)	Giorgi Katsiashvili (GEO)
−60 kg	Koba Mchedlishvili (GEO)	Dzmitry Minkou (BLR)	Ilkin Mammadov (AZE)
−60 kg	Koba Mchedlishvili (GEO)	Dzmitry Minkou (BLR)	Manuchekhr Kodiri (RUS)
−66 kg	Strahinja Bunčić (SRB)	Petar Zadro (BIH)	Bachana Bolkvadze (GEO)
−66 kg	Strahinja Bunčić (SRB)	Petar Zadro (BIH)	Musa Kodzoev (RUS)
−73 kg	Ruslan Godizov (RUS)	Gamzat Zurgaraev (RUS)	Arso Milic (MNE)
−73 kg	Ruslan Godizov (RUS)	Gamzat Zurgaraev (RUS)	Christ Gengoul (FRA)
−81 kg	Mikhail Igolnikov (RUS)	Marko Bubanja (AUT)	Sandro Makatsaria (GER)
−81 kg	Mikhail Igolnikov (RUS)	Marko Bubanja (AUT)	Martin Matijass (GER)
−90 kg	Karlen Palyan (RUS)	Daviti Ramazashvili (GEO)	Rokas Nenartavicius (LTU)
−90 kg	Karlen Palyan (RUS)	Daviti Ramazashvili (GEO)	Shota Vaniev (RUS)
+90 kg	Fedir Panko (UKR)	Ruslan Shakhbazov (RUS)	Alexandr Begmetov (RUS)
+90 kg	Fedir Panko (UKR)	Ruslan Shakhbazov (RUS)	Messie Katanga (FRA)

=== Women's events ===
Event	Gold	Silver	Bronze
−40 kg	Amber Gersjes (NED)	Rabia Senyayla (TUR)	Camelia Ionita (ROU)
−40 kg	Amber Gersjes (NED)	Rabia Senyayla (TUR)	Tsvetelina Tsvetanova (BUL)
−44 kg	Soraya Bernstein (GER)	Noelle Grandjean (FRA)	Réka Pupp (HUN)
−44 kg	Soraya Bernstein (GER)	Noelle Grandjean (FRA)	Kristina Shilova (RUS)
−48 kg	Betina Temelkova (BUL)	Marine Baumans (BEL)	Adele Ravagnani (ITA)
−48 kg	Betina Temelkova (BUL)	Marine Baumans (BEL)	Anja Štangar (SLO)
−52 kg	Katja Stiebeling (GER)	Yuliya Khramova (UKR)	Sofía Fiora (ITA)
−52 kg	Katja Stiebeling (GER)	Yuliya Khramova (UKR)	Sarah Harachi (FRA)
−57 kg	Stefania Adelina Dobre (ROU)	Marta Ermolaeva (UKR)	Nikoletta Balázs (HUN)
−57 kg	Stefania Adelina Dobre (ROU)	Marta Ermolaeva (UKR)	Gaby De By (NED)
−63 kg	Alessandra Prosdocimo (ITA)	Aleksandra Samardzic (BIH)	Patricija Brolih (SLO)
−63 kg	Alessandra Prosdocimo (ITA)	Aleksandra Samardzic (BIH)	Szabina Gercsák (HUN)
−70 kg	Brigita Matić-Ljuba (CRO)	Ekaterina N Tokareva (RUS)	Marie-Ève Gahié (FRA)
−70 kg	Brigita Matić-Ljuba (CRO)	Ekaterina N Tokareva (RUS)	Sara Tintor (SRB)
+70 kg	Kamila Pasternak (POL)	Vasylyna Kyrychenko (UKR)	Emese Kárpati (HUN)
+70 kg	Kamila Pasternak (POL)	Vasylyna Kyrychenko (UKR)	Paula Kulaga (POL)

Source Results
