= Judo at the 2014 Summer Youth Olympics – Girls' 52 kg =

Judo competition

Girls' 52 kg at the II Summer Youth Olympic Games
- Venue: Longjiang Gymnasium
- Date: August 18
- Competitors: 18 from 18 nations

Medalists
1st place, gold medalist(s)		Layana Colman	Brazil
2nd place, silver medalist(s)		Betina Temelkova	Bulgaria
3rd place, bronze medalist(s)		Maruša Štangar	Slovenia
3rd place, bronze medalist(s)		Lee Hye-kyeong	South Korea

The girls' 52 kg tournament in judo at the 2014 Summer Youth Olympics was held on August 18 at the Longjiang Gymnasium.

This event was the second-lightest of the girls' judo weight classes, limiting competitors to a maximum of 52 kilograms of body mass. The tournament bracket consisted of a single-elimination contest culminating in a gold-medal match. There was also a repechage to determine the winners of the two bronze medals. Each judoka who had lost before the finals competed in the repechage with the two finalists getting bronze medals.

== Results ==
=== Main Bracket ===
Round of 32
Liu Xiaoyu (CHN)	001
Nellie Einstein (SWE)	011
Ulyana Minenkova (BLR)	001
Maruša Štangar (SLO)	101

Round of 16
Mariam Janashvili (GEO)	101
Mihanta Andriamifehy (MAD)	000
Paola Acevedo (PUR)	101
Edlene Mondelly (HAI)	000
Layana Colman (BRA)	001
Karla Lorenzana (GUA)	000
Khulan Tseregbaatar (MGL)	000
Nellie Einstein (SWE)	000
Lee Hye-kyeong (KOR)	001
Ayelén Elizeche (ARG)	002
Maruša Štangar (SLO)	100
Maria Siderot (POR)	000
Betina Temelkova (BUL)	101
Brillith Gamarra (PER)	000
Sadjia Amrane (ALG)	101
Sandrine Mbazoghe Endamne (GAB)	000

Quarterfinals
Mariam Janashvili (GEO)	100
Paola Acevedo (PUR)	000
Layana Colman (BRA)	010
Nellie Einstein (SWE)	000
Ayelén Elizeche (ARG)	000
Maruša Štangar (SLO)	100
Betina Temelkova (BUL)	000
Sadjia Amrane (ALG)	000

Semifinals
Mariam Janashvili (GEO)	000
Layana Colman (BRA)	000
Maruša Štangar (SLO)	000
Betina Temelkova (BUL)'	002

Finals
Layana Colman (BRA)	100
Betina Temelkova (BUL)	000

=== Repechage ===
Repechage 1
Bye
Mihanta Andriamifehy (MAD)
Liu Xiaoyu (CHN)	100
Edlene Mondelly (HAI)	002
Bye
Karla Lorenzana (GUA)
Bye
Khulan Tseregbaatar (MGL)
Bye
Lee Hye-kyeong (KOR)
Bye
Maria Siderot (POR)
Bye
Brillith Gamarra (PER)
Ulyana Minenkova (BLR)	110
Sandrine Mbazoghe Endamne (GAB)	000

Repechage 2
Mihanta Andriamifehy (MAD)	000
Liu Xiaoyu (CHN)	000
Karla Lorenzana (GUA)	000
Khulan Tseregbaatar (MGL)	000
Lee Hye-kyeong (KOR)	000
Maria Siderot (POR)	000
Brillith Gamarra (PER)	001
Ulyana Minenkova (BLR)	001

Semifinals

Final

Repechage 3
Liu Xiaoyu (CHN)	001
Nellie Einstein (SWE)	000
Khulan Tseregbaatar (MGL)	000
Paola Acevedo (PUR)	000
Lee Hye-kyeong (KOR)	101
Sadjia Amrane (ALG)	000
Ulyana Minenkova (BLR)	000
Ayelén Elizeche (ARG)	100

Repechage 4
Liu Xiaoyu (CHN)	002
Khulan Tseregbaatar (MGL)	000
Lee Hye-kyeong (KOR)	000
Ayelén Elizeche (ARG)	000

Bronze Medal Finals
Liu Xiaoyu (CHN)	000
Maruša Štangar (SLO)	100
Lee Hye-kyeong (KOR)	100
Mariam Janashvili (GEO)	000
