= Unelle Snyman =

South African judoka (born 1996)

Personal information
- Born: 25 March 1996 (age 30)

Sport
- Country: South Africa
- Sport: Judo
- Weight class: 78 kg
Medal record
Women's judo
Representing South Africa
African Games
Silver medal – second place	2019 Rabat	−78 kg
African Judo Championships
Silver medal – second place	2019 Cape Town	−78 kg
Bronze medal – third place	2018 Tunis	−78 kg
Bronze medal – third place	2018 Tunis	Open

Unelle Snyman (born 25 March 1996) is a South African judoka. She started practicing judo at the age of 5 and participated in numerous competitions. She won the silver medal in her event at the 2019 African Games held in Rabat, Morocco. She has also won medals at the African Judo Championships.

== Career ==
Snyman competed in the girls' 78 kg event at the 2014 Summer Youth Olympics held in Nanjing, China. She also competed in the mixed team event.

In 2019, Snyman won the silver medal in the women's 78 kg event at the African Judo Championships held in Cape Town, South Africa. In the same year, she also competed in the women's 78 kg event at the 2019 World Judo Championships held in Tokyo, Japan where she was eliminated in her first match.

== Achievements ==
Year	Tournament	Place	Weight class
2019	African Games	2nd	−78 kg
