= Dzmitry Minkou =

Belarusian judoka (born 1996)

Personal information
- Nationality: Belarusian
- Born: 31 August 1996 (age 29)
- Occupation: Judoka

Sport
- Country: Belarus
- Sport: Judo
- Weight class: –66 kg

Achievements and titles
- Olympic Games: R16 (2020)
- World Champ.: 7th (2017, 2021)
- European Champ.: 5th (2017, 2021)
Medal record
Men's judo
Representing Belarus
IJF Grand Slam
Silver medal – second place	2021 Tel Aviv	–66 kg
Silver medal – second place	2021 Kazan	–66 kg
Bronze medal – third place	2017 Ekaterinburg	–66 kg
Bronze medal – third place	2018 Ekaterinburg	–66 kg
IJF Grand Prix
Gold medal – first place	2017 Tashkent	–66 kg
European U23 Championships
Gold medal – first place	2017 Podgorica	–66 kg
Silver medal – second place	2015 Bratislava	–66 kg
European Junior Championships
Gold medal – first place	2016 Málaga	–66 kg
World Cadets Championships
Bronze medal – third place	2013 Miami	–60 kg
European Cadet Championships
Silver medal – second place	2012 Bar	–60 kg

Profile at external databases
- IJF: 8316
- JudoInside.com: 74554
- Updated on 1 September 2022

Dzmitry Minkou (born 31 August 1996) is a Belarusian judoka. He competed in the men's 66 kg event at the 2020 Summer Olympics in Tokyo, Japan, being eliminated in the round of 16.

He is the silver medalist of the 2021 Judo Grand Slam Kazan in the -66 kg category.
