= European U23 Judo Championships =

Judo competition

- Current event or competition: 2026 European U23 Judo Championships

Competition details
- Discipline: Judo
- Type: Annual
- Organiser: European Judo Union (EJU)

History
- First edition: Yerevan 2003
- Editions: 24
- Most recent: Naples 2026
- Next edition: Gran Canaria 2027

The European U23 Judo Championships are annual judo competitions organized by the European Judo Union for European judoka aged 23 and younger.

The last contest took place in Naples, Italy. The next contest will be held in Gran Canaria, Spain.

== Competitions ==
Edition	Year	Dates	City and host country	Venue	# Countries	# Athletes	Ref.
1	2003	3–4 November	Yerevan, Armenia				
2	2004	27–28 November	Ljubljana, Slovenia				
3	2005	19–20 November	Kyiv, Ukraine				
4	2006	25 November	Moscow, Russia				
5	2007	24–25 November	Salzburg, Austria				
6	2008	21–23 November	Zagreb, Croatia				
7	2009	20–22 November	Antalya, Turkey				
8	2010	19–21 November	Sarajevo, Bosnia and Herzegovina				
9	2011	18–20 November	Tyumen, Russia				
10	2012	16–18 November	Prague, Czech Republic				
11	2013	15–17 November	Samokov, Bulgaria				
12	2014	14–16 November	Wrocław, Poland				
13	2015	13–15 November	Bratislava, Slovakia	Eurovia Aréna	36	320	
14	2016	11–12 November	Tel Aviv, Israel	Drive in Arena	40	321	
15	2017	10–12 November	Podgorica, Montenegro	Morača Sports Center	40	301	
16	2018	2–4 November	Győr, Hungary	Audi Aréna	37	296	
17	2019	1–3 November	Izhevsk, Russia	Izhstal Sport Palace	33	235	
18	2020	9–10 November	Poreč, Croatia	Intersport Hall	36	327	
19	2021	5–7 November	Budapest, Hungary	Ludovika University	38	297	
20	2022	28–30 October	Sarajevo, Bosnia and Herzegovina	Arena Hotel Hills	40	300	
21	2023	17–19 November	Potsdam, Germany	MBS Arena Potsdam	37	310	
22	2024	15–17 November	Piła, Poland	MOSiR Sports Hall	36	321	
23	2025	31 October – 2 November	Chișinău, Moldova				
24	2026	30 October – 1 November	Naples, Italy				
25	2027	29–31 October	Gran Canaria, Spain				

== Team competitions ==
Mixed team
Year	Gold	Silver	Bronze		Ref.
2021	Georgia	Russia	Hungary	France	(Note: The 2021 championships featured the inaugural U23 European Championships mixed team event)
2022	Turkey	Germany	Hungary	Georgia	
2023	Germany	Netherlands	Hungary	Georgia	
2024	Georgia	Ukraine	Netherlands	Germany	
2025	Georgia	France	Ukraine	Turkey	
2026	France	Georgia	Italy	Germany	

== See also ==
- European Judo Championships
- European Junior Judo Championships
- European Cadet Judo Championships
