= World Judo Juniors Championships =

Judo competition

- Current event or competition: 2026 World Judo Juniors Championships

Competition details
- Discipline: Judo
- Type: Annual
- Organiser: International Judo Federation (IJF)

History
- First edition: 1974 in Rio de Janeiro, Brazil
- Editions: 28
- Most recent: Lima 2025
- Next edition: Tashkent 2026

The World Judo Juniors Championships are the highest level of international judo competition for juniors, 20_{until 2012}/21_{since 2013} years of age or less. The championships are held once every year (except the years when the Olympics take place) by the International Judo Federation, and qualified judoka compete in their respective categories as representatives of their home countries. The World Juniors Championships are the only junior event awarding ranking points for the seniors world ranking list. The last edition of the championships took place in Lima, Peru in 2025.

== Competitions ==
Edition	Year	Dates	City and host country	Venue	# Countries	# Athletes	Ref.
1	1974	14–15 September	Rio de Janeiro, Brazil				
2	1976	18–19 December	Madrid, Spain				
3	1983	10–12 June	Mayagüez, Puerto Rico				
4	1986	11–13 April	Rome, Italy				
5	1990	30 March – 1 April	Dijon, France				
6	1992	8–11 October	Buenos Aires, Argentina				
7	1994	3–6 November	Cairo, Egypt				
8	1996	3–6 October	Porto, Portugal				
9	1998	8–11 October	Cali, Colombia				
10	2000	26–29 October	Nabeul, Tunisia				
11	2002	12–15 September	Jeju Island, South Korea				
12	2004	14–17 October	Budapest, Hungary				
13	2006	12–15 October	Santo Domingo, Dominican Republic				
14	2008	23–26 October	Bangkok, Thailand				
15	2009	22–25 October	Paris, France				
16	2010	21–24 October	Agadir, Morocco				
17	2011	3–6 November	Cape Town, South Africa		75	567	
18	2013	23–26 October	Ljubljana, Slovenia		89	726	
19	2014	22–25 October	Fort Lauderdale, United States		72	518	
20	2015	23–26 October	Abu Dhabi, United Arab Emirates		81	555	
21	2017	18–22 October	Zagreb, Croatia	Dom Sportova	83	590	
22	2018	17–21 October	Nassau, The Bahamas	Imperial Arena	66	425	
23	2019	16–19 October	Marrakesh, Morocco		81	517	
24	2021	6–10 October	Olbia, Italy	Geopalace	72	490	
25	2022	10–14 August	Guayaquil, Ecuador	Arena Fedeguayas VPP	63	373	
26	2023	4–8 October	Odivelas, Portugal	Sports complex Multiusos de Odivelas	68	541	
27	2024	2–6 October	Dushanbe, Tajikistan	Kasri Tennis	67	531	
28	2025	5–8 October	Lima, Peru	Coliseo Eduardo Dibós	65	463	
29	2026	19–22 November	Tashkent, Uzbekistan	Martial Arts Sports Complex, Olympic Village	78	574	
30	2027	7–9 October	Amman, Jordan				

== Team competitions ==
Men's team
Year	Gold	Silver	Bronze		Ref.
2013	Georgia	Greece	Ukraine	Japan	
2014	Japan	Georgia	South Korea	Russia	
2015	Japan	Georgia	Belarus	Russia	

Women's team
Year	Gold	Silver	Bronze		Ref.
2013	Japan	France	Croatia	Germany	
2014	Japan	France	South Korea	Russia	
2015	Japan	France	Germany	Netherlands	

Mixed team
Year	Gold	Silver	Bronze		Ref.
2017	Japan	Netherlands	Russia	Germany	
2018	Japan	Brazil	Russia	Kazakhstan	
2019	Japan	Russia	France	Georgia	
2021	France	Russia	Turkey	Germany	
2022	Japan	Turkey	France	Germany	
2023	Japan	France	Brazil	Portugal	
2024	Japan	France	South Korea	Uzbekistan	
2025	Japan	France	Brazil	IJF	

== Point Contribution to Senior World Ranking List ==
Since 2019, World Juniors Championships contribute ranking points equal to an IJF Grand Prix for the Senior World Ranking List as well as Junior WRL points. The points also count towards Olympic Games qualification.
