= 2024 World Judo Championships – Men's 60 kg =

Judo competition

Judo Men's 60 kg at the 2024 World Judo Championships
- Venue: Mubadala Arena
- Location: Abu Dhabi, United Arab Emirates
- Date: 19 May 2024
- Competitors: 48 from 36 nations
- Total prize money: €57,000

Medalists
| gold medal | Giorgi Sardalashvili (1st title) | Georgia |
| silver medal | Yang Yung-wei | Chinese Taipei |
| bronze medal | Taiki Nakamura | Japan |
| bronze medal | Lee Ha-rim | South Korea |

Competition at external databases
- Links: IJF • JudoInside

The Men's 60 kg event at the 2024 World Judo Championships was held at the Mubadala Arena in Abu Dhabi, United Arab Emirates on 19 May 2024.

== Results ==
=== Finals ===
Semi-finals
(Chinese Taipei) Yang Yung-wei | 10 (yellow card)
Ayub Bliev | 00
(Georgia (country)) Giorgi Sardalashvili | 01 (yellow card)
(Japan) Taiki Nakamura | 00

Final
(Chinese Taipei) Yang Yung-wei | 00
(Georgia (country)) Giorgi Sardalashvili | 01

=== Repechage ===
Repechage
(France) Romain Valadier-Picard
(Kazakhstan) Yeldos Smetov | w/o
(Azerbaijan) Turan Bayramov | 00
(South Korea) Lee Ha-rim | 10 (yellow card)

Bronze medal
(Kazakhstan) Yeldos Smetov | 00 (yellow card)
(Japan) Taiki Nakamura | 10
(South Korea) Lee Ha-rim | w/o
Ayub Bliev

=== Pool A ===
First round
(Democratic Republic of the Congo) Arnold Kisoka | 00
(Belgium) Jorre Verstraeten | 10 (yellow card)
(United States) Christopher Velazco | 10 (yellow card)
(Saudi Arabia) Abdulrahman Al-Saiari | 00
(Italy) Andrea Carlino | 00
(Netherlands) Emiel Jaring | 10
(Jamaica) Ashley McKenzie | 11
(Ukraine) Artem Lesiuk | 00

Round of 32
(Chinese Taipei) Yang Yung-wei | 01 (yellow card)
(Belgium) Jorre Verstraeten | 00 (yellow card)
(United States) Christopher Velazco | 00
(Egypt) Youssry Samy | 10
(France) Romain Valadier-Picard | 10 (yellow card)
(Netherlands) Emiel Jaring | 00
(Jamaica) Ashley McKenzie | 00 (yellow card)
(Uzbekistan) Doston Ruziev | 10 (yellow card)

Round of 16
(Chinese Taipei) Yang Yung-wei | 10
(Egypt) Youssry Samy | 00
(France) Romain Valadier-Picard | 10
(Uzbekistan) Doston Ruziev | 00

Quarter-finals
(Chinese Taipei) Yang Yung-wei | 11
(France) Romain Valadier-Picard | 00

=== Pool B ===
First round
Ayub Bliev | 11
(Paraguay) Mateo Cabral | 00
(Cuba) Jonathan Charon | 10
(Mongolia) Byambajavyn Tsogt-Ochir | 00
(Tajikistan) Muhammadsoleh Quvatov | 00 (yellow card)
(Brazil) Michel Augusto | 01
(Kazakhstan) Yeldos Smetov | 10
(Vietnam) Chu Đức Đạt | 00

Round of 32
(Japan) Ryuju Nagayama | 00 (yellow card)
Ayub Bliev | 01 (yellow card)
(Cuba) Jonathan Charon | 00
(Israel) Ariel Shulman | 10
(Azerbaijan) Balabay Aghayev | 00
(Brazil) Michel Augusto | 10 (yellow card)
(Kazakhstan) Yeldos Smetov | 01
(South Korea) Kim Won-jin | 00 (yellow card)

Round of 16
Ayub Bliev | 10 (yellow card)
(Israel) Ariel Shulman | 00
(Brazil) Michel Augusto | 00
(Kazakhstan) Yeldos Smetov | 10

Quarter-finals
Ayub Bliev | 01 (yellow card)
(Kazakhstan) Yeldos Smetov | 00 (yellow card)

=== Pool C ===
First round
(Turkmenistan) Aýbek Ömirow | 00
(Netherlands) Tornike Tsjakadoea | 10 (yellow card)
(Mongolia) Enkhtaivany Ariunbold | 00
(Azerbaijan) Turan Bayramov | 01 (yellow card)
(North Korea) Chae Kwang-jin | 10
(Mexico) Arath Juárez | 00
(El Salvador) Jairo Moreno | 00
(Chinese Taipei) Lin Chong-you | 10

Round of 32
(Spain) Francisco Garrigós | 00
(Netherlands) Tornike Tsjakadoea | 10
(Azerbaijan) Turan Bayramov | 10 (yellow card)
(United States) David Terao | 00
(Georgia (country)) Giorgi Sardalashvili | 01
(North Korea) Chae Kwang-jin | 00
(Chinese Taipei) Lin Chong-you | 02 (yellow card)
(Morocco) Younes Saddiki | 01

Round of 16
(Netherlands) Tornike Tsjakadoea | 00
(Azerbaijan) Turan Bayramov | 11 (yellow card)
(Georgia (country)) Giorgi Sardalashvili | 10
(Chinese Taipei) Lin Chong-you | 00

Quarter-finals
(Azerbaijan) Turan Bayramov | 01 (yellow card)
(Georgia (country)) Giorgi Sardalashvili | 02 (yellow card)

=== Pool D ===
First round
(Israel) Yam Wolczak | 01 (yellow card)
(Portugal) Rodrigo Costa Lopes | 00 (yellow card)
(Japan) Taiki Nakamura | 10 (yellow card)
(Uzbekistan) Dilshodbek Baratov | 00 (yellow card)
(Angola) Leonardo Barros | 00 (yellow card)
(Cyprus) Petros Christodoulides | 02 (yellow card)
(Malta) James Zahra | 10
(Turkey) Salih Yıldız | 00

Round of 32
(France) Luka Mkheidze | 02
(Israel) Yam Wolczak | 00
(Japan) Taiki Nakamura | 02
(Italy) Angelo Pantano | 00
(South Korea) Lee Ha-rim | 10
(Cyprus) Petros Christodoulides | 00
(Malta) James Zahra | 00
(Kazakhstan) Nurkanat Serikbayev | 02

Round of 16
(France) Luka Mkheidze | 00
(Japan) Taiki Nakamura | 01 (yellow card)
(South Korea) Lee Ha-rim | 01 (yellow card)
(Kazakhstan) Nurkanat Serikbayev | 00

Quarter-finals
(Japan) Taiki Nakamura | 01 (yellow card)
(South Korea) Lee Ha-rim | 00

== Prize money ==
The sums listed bring the total prizes awarded to €57,000 for the individual event.

| Medal | Total | Judoka | Coach |
|---|---|---|---|
| Gold | €26,000 | €20,800 | €5,200 |
| Silver | €15,000 | €12,000 | €3,000 |
| Bronze | €8,000 | €6,400 | €1,600 |
