= 2025 World Judo Championships – Men's 60 kg =

Judo competition

Judo Men's 60 kg at the 2025 World Judo Championships
- Venue: László Papp Budapest Sports Arena
- Location: Budapest, Hungary
- Date: 13 June 2025
- Competitors: 36 from 30 nations
- Total prize money: €57,000

Medalists
gold medal	Ryuju Nagayama (1st title)	Japan
silver medal	Romain Valadier-Picard	France
bronze medal	Kazirbekiin Yolk	Mongolia
bronze medal	Ayub Bliev

Competition at external databases
- Links: IJF • JudoInside

The 2025 World Judo Championships was held at the László Papp Budapest Sports Arena in Budapest, Hungary on 13 June 2025.

== Results ==
=== Finals ===
Semi-finals
(France) Romain Valadier-Picard	010 (yellow card)
(International Judo Federation) Ayub Bliev	000 (yellow card)
(Japan) Ryuju Nagayama	001 (yellow card)
(Brazil) Michel Augusto	000

Final
(France) Romain Valadier-Picard	000 (yellow card)
(Japan) Ryuju Nagayama	020 (yellow card)

=== Repechage ===
Repechage
(Hungary) Csanád Feczkó	000 (yellow card)
(Mongolia) Kazirbekiin Yolk	001 (yellow card)
(Kazakhstan) Magzhan Shamshadin	000 (yellow card)
(Hungary) Márton Andrási	001

Bronze medal
(Mongolia) Kazirbekiin Yolk	100 (yellow card)
(Brazil) Michel Augusto	000
(Hungary) Márton Andrási	000 (yellow card)
(International Judo Federation) Ayub Bliev	100

=== Pool A ===
First round
(Spain) Luis Barroso López	001
(Cyprus) Petros Christodoulides	000 (yellow card)

Round of 32
(France) Luka Mkheidze	020
(Spain) Luis Barroso López	000
(Hungary) Csanád Feczkó	100 (yellow card)
(Egypt) Youssry Samy	000 (yellow card)
(France) Romain Valadier-Picard	100
(Italy) Andrea Carlino	000
(Cuba) Jonathan Charon	000
(Tajikistan) Mehrzod Sufiev	001

Round of 16
(France) Luka Mkheidze	000 (yellow card)
(Hungary) Csanád Feczkó	100
(France) Romain Valadier-Picard	010
(Tajikistan) Mehrzod Sufiev	000

Quarter-finals
(Hungary) Csanád Feczkó	000
(France) Romain Valadier-Picard	022

=== Pool B ===
First round
(South Korea) Lee Ha-rim	100 (yellow card)
(Austria) Daniel Leutgeb	000

Round of 32
(Chinese Taipei) Yang Yung-wei	000
(Ecuador) Jonathan Benavides	001
(United States) Jonathan Yang	000
(Mongolia) Kazirbekiin Yolk	001 (yellow card)
(International Judo Federation) Ayub Bliev	002
(Netherlands) Emiel Jaring	000 (yellow card)
(South Korea) Lee Ha-rim	010
(Kazakhstan) Sherzod Davlatov	000

Round of 16
(Ecuador) Jonathan Benavides	000
(Mongolia) Kazirbekiin Yolk	100
(International Judo Federation) Ayub Bliev	010
(South Korea) Lee Ha-rim	000 (yellow card)

Quarter-finals
(Mongolia) Kazirbekiin Yolk	000
(International Judo Federation) Ayub Bliev	100

=== Pool C ===
First round
(Kazakhstan) Magzhan Shamshadin	100 (yellow card)
(United States) David Terao	000

Round of 32
(Japan) Ryuju Nagayama	100
(Azerbaijan) Ahmad Yusifov	010
(Bahrain) Ruslan Poltoratskii	100
(El Salvador) Jairo Moreno	000
(Spain) Francisco Garrigós	000
(Kazakhstan) Magzhan Shamshadin	100
(Turkmenistan) Aýbek Ömirow	000 (yellow card)
(Belgium) Jorre Verstraeten	010

Round of 16
(Japan) Ryuju Nagayama	001
(Bahrain) Ruslan Poltoratskii	000
(Kazakhstan) Magzhan Shamshadin	001
(Belgium) Jorre Verstraeten	000

Quarter-finals
(Japan) Ryuju Nagayama	010
(Kazakhstan) Magzhan Shamshadin	001 (yellow card)

=== Pool D ===
First round
(Mongolia) Enkhtaivany Ariunbold	001 (yellow card)
(Germany) Maximilian Heyder	000

Round of 32
(Georgia (country)) Giorgi Sardalashvili	100
(Angola) Leonardo Barros	000
(Hungary) Márton Andrási	100
(Malta) James Zahra	000 (yellow card)
(Brazil) Michel Augusto	100
(Armenia) Ashik Andreyan	000
(Mongolia) Enkhtaivany Ariunbold	100 (yellow card)
(Uzbekistan) Bakhrom Boturov	000

Round of 16
(Georgia (country)) Giorgi Sardalashvili	000
(Hungary) Márton Andrási	001 (yellow card)
(Brazil) Michel Augusto	100 (yellow card)
(Mongolia) Enkhtaivany Ariunbold	000

Quarter-finals
(Hungary) Márton Andrási	000
(Brazil) Michel Augusto	001

== Prize money ==
The sums listed bring the total prizes awarded to €57,000 for the individual event.

Medal	Total	Judoka	Coach
Gold	€26,000	€20,800	€5,200
Silver	€15,000	€12,000	€3,000
Bronze	€8,000	€6,400	€1,600
