= 2023 World Judo Championships – Men's 60 kg =

Judo competition

Judo Men's 60 kg at the 2023 World Judo Championships
- Venue: Ali Bin Hamad Al Attiya Arena
- Location: Doha, Qatar
- Date: 7 May 2023
- Competitors: 37 from 31 nations
- Total prize money: €57,000

Medalists
gold medal	Francisco Garrigós (1st title)	Spain
silver medal	Dilshodbek Baratov	Uzbekistan
bronze medal	Giorgi Sardalashvili	Georgia
bronze medal	Lee Ha-rim	South Korea

Competition at external databases
- Links: IJF • JudoInside

The Men's 60 kg event at the 2023 World Judo Championships was held at the Ali Bin Hamad al-Attiyah Arena in Doha, Qatar on 7 May 2023.

== Results ==
=== Finals ===
Semi-finals
(Japan) Naohisa Takato	01
(Spain) Francisco Garrigós	11
(Uzbekistan) Dilshodbek Baratov	01
(Belgium) Jorre Verstraeten	00

Final
(Spain) Francisco Garrigós	01
(Uzbekistan) Dilshodbek Baratov	00

=== Repechage ===
Repechage
(Kazakhstan) Nurkanat Serikbayev	00
(Georgia (country)) Giorgi Sardalashvili	10
(Morocco) Younes Saddiki	00
(South Korea) Lee Ha-rim	10

Bronze medal
(Georgia (country)) Giorgi Sardalashvili	10
(Belgium) Jorre Verstraeten	00
(South Korea) Lee Ha-rim	10
(Japan) Naohisa Takato	00

=== Pool A ===
First round
(Turkmenistan) Hakberdi Jumaýew	11
(Costa Rica) Sebastián Sancho	00

Round of 32
(Chinese Taipei) Yang Yung-wei	10
(Portugal) Rodrigo Costa Lopes	00
(Moldova) Alexandru Tîrsînă	00
(Kazakhstan) Nurkanat Serikbayev	01
(Japan) Naohisa Takato	01
(Turkmenistan) Hakberdi Jumaýew	00
(Colombia) Johan Rojas	00
(Azerbaijan) Turan Bayramov	10

Round of 16
(Chinese Taipei) Yang Yung-wei	00
(Kazakhstan) Nurkanat Serikbayev	01
(Japan) Naohisa Takato	10
(Azerbaijan) Turan Bayramov	00

Quarter-finals
(Kazakhstan) Nurkanat Serikbayev	00
(Japan) Naohisa Takato	10

=== Pool B ===
First round
(France) Cédric Revol	00
(South Korea) Jeon Seung-beom	10

Round of 32
(Spain) Francisco Garrigós	11
(Italy) Angelo Pantano	00
(South Korea) Jeon Seung-beom	01
(Egypt) Youssry Samy	00
(Georgia (country)) Giorgi Sardalashvili	10
(Zambia) Simon Zulu	00
(Austria) Marcus Auer	10
(Guatemala) José Ramos	00

Round of 16
(Spain) Francisco Garrigós	01
(South Korea) Jeon Seung-beom	00
(Georgia (country)) Giorgi Sardalashvili	10
(Austria) Marcus Auer	00

Quarter-finals
(Spain) Francisco Garrigós	10
(Georgia (country)) Giorgi Sardalashvili	00

=== Pool C ===
First round
(Angola) Barros Menezes	10
(Germany) Maximilian Standke	00

Round of 32
(Azerbaijan) Balabay Aghayev	11
(Tunisia) Fraj Dhouibi	00
(Angola) Barros Menezes	00
(Morocco) Younes Saddiki	01
(Mongolia) Enkhtaivany Ariunbold	00
(Uzbekistan) Dilshodbek Baratov	01
(Turkmenistan) Aýbek Ömirow	00
(Kazakhstan) Yeldos Smetov	10

Round of 16
(Azerbaijan) Balabay Aghayev	01
(Morocco) Younes Saddiki	10
(Uzbekistan) Dilshodbek Baratov	01
(Kazakhstan) Yeldos Smetov	00

Quarter-finals
(Morocco) Younes Saddiki	00
(Uzbekistan) Dilshodbek Baratov	02

=== Pool D ===
First round
(Czech Republic) David Pulkrábek	00
(Israel) Yam Wolczak	02
(Chinese Taipei) Lin Chong-you	01
(Slovenia) David Štarkel	00

Round of 32
(South Korea) Lee Ha-rim	10
(Israel) Yam Wolczak	00
(Turkey) Salih Yıldız	10
(Kyrgyzstan) Khanbolot Yrysbekov	00
(Belgium) Jorre Verstraeten	11
(France) Luka Mkheidze	01
(Chinese Taipei) Lin Chong-you	11
(Ecuador) Bryan Garboa	00

Round of 16
(South Korea) Lee Ha-rim	10
(Turkey) Salih Yıldız	00
(Belgium) Jorre Verstraeten	11
(Chinese Taipei) Lin Chong-you	01

Quarter-finals
(South Korea) Lee Ha-rim	00
(Belgium) Jorre Verstraeten	10

== Prize money ==
The sums listed bring the total prizes awarded to €57,000 for the individual event.

Medal	Total	Judoka	Coach
Gold	€26,000	€20,800	€5,200
Silver	€15,000	€12,000	€3,000
Bronze	€8,000	€6,400	€1,600
