= 2026 European Judo Championships – Men's 60 kg =

Judo competition

Judo Men's 60 kg at the 2026 European Judo Championships
- Venue: Olympic Palace
- Location: Tbilisi, Georgia
- Date: 16 April 2026
- Competitors: 26 from 18 nations

Medalists
gold medal	Luka Mkheidze (2nd title)	France
silver medal	Giorgi Sardalashvili	Georgia
bronze medal	Izhak Ashpiz	Israel
bronze medal	Ahmad Yusifov	Azerbaijan

Competition at external databases
- Links: IJF • JudoInside

The men's 60 kg event at the 2026 European Judo Championships was held at the Olympic Palace in Tbilisi, Georgia on 16 April 2026.

== Results ==
=== Finals ===
Semi-finals
(Azerbaijan) Balabay Aghayev	001 (yellow card)
(Georgia (country)) Giorgi Sardalashvili	010
(Israel) Izhak Ashpiz	000
(France) Luka Mkheidze	100

Final
(Georgia (country)) Giorgi Sardalashvili	000 (yellow card)
(France) Luka Mkheidze	101 (yellow card)

=== Repechage ===
Repechage
(Ukraine) Dilshot Khalmatov	100
(Belgium) Jorre Verstraeten	000 (yellow card)
(France) Romain Valadier-Picard	001
(Azerbaijan) Ahmad Yusifov	010 (yellow card)

Bronze medal
(Ukraine) Dilshot Khalmatov	000 (yellow card)
(Israel) Izhak Ashpiz	001 (yellow card)
(Azerbaijan) Ahmad Yusifov	100 (yellow card)
(Azerbaijan) Balabay Aghayev	000 (yellow card)

=== Pool A ===
First round
(Slovenia) Gal Blažič	000
(Italy) Andrea Carlino	100 (yellow card)
(Ukraine) Dilshot Khalmatov	100
(Hungary) Csanád Feczkó	000 (yellow card)
(Belarus) Artsiom Kolasau	101 (yellow card)
(Armenia) Vahe Aghasyan	001

Round of 16
(Azerbaijan) Balabay Aghayev	022
(Italy) Andrea Carlino	000
(Ukraine) Dilshot Khalmatov	100
(Belarus) Artsiom Kolasau	000

Quarter-finals
(Azerbaijan) Balabay Aghayev	100
(Ukraine) Dilshot Khalmatov	000

=== Pool B ===
First round
(Malta) James Zahra	000
(Germany) Maximilian Heyder	020
(Spain) Francisco Garrigós	101
(Poland) Ksawery Ignasiak	000

Round of 16
(Georgia (country)) Giorgi Sardalashvili	001
(Germany) Maximilian Heyder	000 (yellow card)
(Belgium) Jorre Verstraeten	001 (yellow card)
(Spain) Francisco Garrigós	000

Quarter-finals
(Georgia (country)) Giorgi Sardalashvili	011 (yellow card)
(Belgium) Jorre Verstraeten	000

=== Pool C ===
First round
(Slovenia) David Štarkel	000
(Ukraine) Artem Lesiuk	001
(Israel) Izhak Ashpiz	011 (yellow card)
(Armenia) Ashik Andreyan	001 (yellow card)
(Belgium) Olivier Naert	000 (yellow card)
(Turkey) Salih Yıldız	001 (yellow card)

Round of 16
(France) Romain Valadier-Picard	101
(Ukraine) Artem Lesiuk	001
(Israel) Izhak Ashpiz	100 (yellow card)
(Turkey) Salih Yıldız	000

Quarter-finals
(France) Romain Valadier-Picard	000
(Israel) Izhak Ashpiz	002

=== Pool D ===
First round
(United Kingdom) Charlie Ayre	100 (yellow card)
(Hungary) Márton Andrási	000 (yellow card)
(Portugal) Bernardo Tralhão Fernandes	000 (yellow card)
(Spain) Luis Barroso López	010 (yellow card)

Round of 16
(Azerbaijan) Ahmad Yusifov	011 (yellow card)
(United Kingdom) Charlie Ayre	001
(France) Luka Mkheidze	001
(Spain) Luis Barroso López	000

Quarter-finals
(Azerbaijan) Ahmad Yusifov	000 (yellow card)
(France) Luka Mkheidze	001
