= 2026 World Judo Championships – Men's 60 kg =

Judo competition

Judo Men's 60 kg at the 2026 World Judo Championships
- Venue: National Gymnastics Arena
- Location: Baku, Azerbaijan
- Date: 4 October 2026
- Competitors: 43 from 35 nations
- Total prize money: €57,000

Medalists
gold medal	Ahmad Yusifov (1st title)	Azerbaijan
silver medal	Sherzod Davlatov	Kazakhstan
bronze medal	Ryuju Nagayama	Japan
bronze medal	Giorgi Sardalashvili	Georgia

Competition at external databases
- Links: IJF • JudoInside

The men's 60 kg event at the 2026 World Judo Championships was held at the National Gymnastics Arena in Baku, Azerbaijan on 4 October 2026.

== Results ==
=== Finals ===
Semi-finals
(Chinese Taipei) Yang Yung-wei	000 (yellow card)
(Azerbaijan) Ahmad Yusifov	010 (yellow card)
(Japan) Ryuju Nagayama	000 (yellow card)
(Kazakhstan) Sherzod Davlatov	001 (yellow card)

Final
(Azerbaijan) Ahmad Yusifov	020
(Kazakhstan) Sherzod Davlatov	010 (yellow card)

=== Repechage ===
Repechage
(United States) Jonathan Yang	000
(Russia) Ayub Bliev	001 (yellow card)
(Georgia (country)) Giorgi Sardalashvili	100
(France) Romain Valadier-Picard	000

Bronze medal
(Russia) Ayub Bliev	000
(Japan) Ryuju Nagayama	001
(Georgia (country)) Giorgi Sardalashvili	100
(Chinese Taipei) Yang Yung-wei	000

=== Pool A ===
First round
(Belarus) Artsiom Kolasau	000
(Ukraine) Dilshot Khalmatov	100
(Spain) Luis Barroso López	001
(Hungary) Csanád Feczkó	000

Round of 32
(Azerbaijan) Balabay Aghayev	100
(Ukraine) Dilshot Khalmatov	000
(Turkey) Salih Yıldız	000 (yellow card)
(United States) Jonathan Yang	100
(Chinese Taipei) Yang Yung-wei	001
(Spain) Luis Barroso López	000
(Italy) Andrea Carlino	000
(Morocco) Ahmed Alaoui Cherifi	001

Round of 16
(Azerbaijan) Balabay Aghayev	000 (yellow card)
(United States) Jonathan Yang	100
(Chinese Taipei) Yang Yung-wei	100
(Morocco) Ahmed Alaoui Cherifi	000 (yellow card)

Quarter-finals
(United States) Jonathan Yang	000
(Chinese Taipei) Yang Yung-wei	100

=== Pool B ===
First round
(Cuba) Jonathan Charon	000
(Kazakhstan) Aman Bakytzhan	010
(Uzbekistan) Bakhrom Boturov	000
(Mongolia) Tüvshintöriin Tümenjargal	001 (yellow card)
(Australia) Pedro Antun Neto	000
(India) Harsh Singh	010

Round of 32
(Russia) Ayub Bliev	100 (yellow card)
(France) Luka Mkheidze	000
(Kazakhstan) Aman Bakytzhan	010 (yellow card)
(Slovenia) David Štarkel	000
(Azerbaijan) Ahmad Yusifov	001 (yellow card)
(Mongolia) Tüvshintöriin Tümenjargal	000
(India) Harsh Singh	001
(Bahrain) Ruslan Poltoratskii	000 (yellow card)

Round of 16
(Russia) Ayub Bliev	100
(Kazakhstan) Aman Bakytzhan	000
(Azerbaijan) Ahmad Yusifov	100
(India) Harsh Singh	000 (yellow card)

Quarter-finals
(Russia) Ayub Bliev	000 (yellow card)
(Azerbaijan) Ahmad Yusifov	001

=== Pool C ===
First round
(Niger) Moussa Yahaya	000
(Portugal) Bernardo Tralhão Fernandes	100
(Australia) Josh Katz	100
(Chile) Kobe Chávez	000 (yellow card)
(Mongolia) Byambasürengiin Sükhbat	011 (yellow card)
(Ukraine) Artem Lesiuk	012

Round of 32
(Israel) Izhak Ashpiz	000
(Georgia (country)) Giorgi Sardalashvili	100
(Portugal) Bernardo Tralhão Fernandes	100
Ali Popalzai	000
(Japan) Ryuju Nagayama	100
(Australia) Josh Katz	000 (yellow card)
(Ukraine) Artem Lesiuk	101
(China) Sun Jiahao	000 (yellow card)

Round of 16
(Georgia (country)) Giorgi Sardalashvili	110
(Portugal) Bernardo Tralhão Fernandes	000
(Japan) Ryuju Nagayama	011 (yellow card)
(Ukraine) Artem Lesiuk	000

Quarter-finals
(Georgia (country)) Giorgi Sardalashvili	000
(Japan) Ryuju Nagayama	100 (yellow card)

=== Pool D ===
First round
(Saudi Arabia) Abdulrahman Al-Saiari	000
(United States) Christopher Velazco	100
(Tajikistan) Loiq Kudbudinov	001 (yellow card)
(Kazakhstan) Sherzod Davlatov	002 (yellow card)
(Hungary) Márton Andrási	100 (yellow card)
(El Salvador) Jairo Moreno	000

Round of 32
(Brazil) Michel Augusto	100 (yellow card)
(United States) Christopher Velazco	000
(Kazakhstan) Sherzod Davlatov	100
(Burundi) Raoul Brillant Nganji	000
(France) Romain Valadier-Picard	100 (yellow card)
(Hungary) Márton Andrási	000
(Belgium) Jorre Verstraeten	001 (yellow card)
(United Kingdom) Charlie Ayre	000

Round of 16
(Brazil) Michel Augusto	001 (yellow card)
(Kazakhstan) Sherzod Davlatov	011
(France) Romain Valadier-Picard	100 (yellow card)
(Belgium) Jorre Verstraeten	000

Quarter-finals
(Kazakhstan) Sherzod Davlatov	100 (yellow card)
(France) Romain Valadier-Picard	000

== Prize money ==
The sums listed bring the total prizes awarded to €57,000 for the individual event.

Medal	Total	Judoka	Coach
Gold	€26,000	€20,800	€5,200
Silver	€15,000	€12,000	€3,000
Bronze	€8,000	€6,400	€1,600
