= 2022 World Judo Championships – Men's 60 kg =

Judo competition

Judo Men's 60 kg at the 2022 World Judo Championships
- Venue: Humo Ice Dome
- Location: Tashkent, Uzbekistan
- Date: 6 October
- Competitors: 42 from 34 nations
- Total prize money: €57,000

Medalists
gold medal	Naohisa Takato (4th title)	Japan
silver medal	Enkhtaivany Ariunbold	Mongolia
bronze medal	Yeldos Smetov	Kazakhstan
bronze medal	Yang Yung-wei	Chinese Taipei

Competition at external databases
- Links: IJF • JudoInside

The Men's 60 kg event at the 2022 World Judo Championships was held at the Humo Ice Dome arena in Tashkent, Uzbekistan on 6 October 2022.

== Results ==
=== Finals ===
Semi-finals
(Chinese Taipei) Yang Yung-wei	00
(Japan) Naohisa Takato	01
(Mongolia) Enkhtaivany Ariunbold	10
(Uzbekistan) Dilshodbek Baratov	00

Final
(Japan) Naohisa Takato	11
(Mongolia) Enkhtaivany Ariunbold	00

=== Repechage ===
Repechage
(Kazakhstan) Yeldos Smetov	01
(Spain) Francisco Garrigos	00
(Italy) Angelo Pantano	01
(Israel) Yam Wolczak	10

Bronze medal
(Kazakhstan) Yeldos Smetov	01
(Uzbekistan) Dilshodbek Baratov	00
(Israel) Yam Wolczak	00
(Chinese Taipei) Yang Yung-wei	11

=== Pool A ===
First round
(Brazil) Allan Kuwabara	00
(United Kingdom) Samuel Hall	10
(Mongolia) Enkhtaivany Sumiyabazar	01
(Egypt) Youssry Samy	00

Round of 32
(Chinese Taipei) Yang Yung-wei	10
(United Kingdom) Samuel Hall	01
(Morocco) Younes Saddiki	00
(Mongolia) Enkhtaivany Sumiyabazar	01
(Azerbaijan) Karamat Huseynov	00
(Kazakhstan) Yeldos Smetov	01
(Israel) Matan Kokolayev	10
(France) Cédric Revol	00

Round of 16
(Chinese Taipei) Yang Yung-wei	10
(Mongolia) Enkhtaivany Sumiyabazar	00
(Kazakhstan) Yeldos Smetov	10
(Israel) Matan Kokolayev	00

Quarter-finals
(Chinese Taipei) Yang Yung-wei	01
(Kazakhstan) Yeldos Smetov	00

=== Pool B ===
First round
(Slovenia) David Štarkel	00
(Turkey) Salih Yıldız	01
Mohammad Rashnonezhad	w/o
~~(Turkmenistan) Hakberdi Jumaýew~~	00
(South Korea) Jeon Seung-beom	10
(Greece) Savva Karakizidi	00

Round of 32
(Spain) Francisco Garrigos	10
(Turkey) Salih Yıldız	00
(Ukraine) Dilshot Khalmatov	00
Mohammad Rashnonezhad	10
(Japan) Naohisa Takato	10
(Germany) Moritz Plafky	00
(South Korea) Jeon Seung-beom	10
(Cuba) Danny Porte	00

Round of 16
(Spain) Francisco Garrigos	10
Mohammad Rashnonezhad	00
(Japan) Naohisa Takato	10
(South Korea) Jeon Seung-beom	00

Quarter-finals
(Spain) Francisco Garrigos	00
(Japan) Naohisa Takato	10

=== Pool C ===
First round
(Niger) Souleymane Seibou	00
(Austria) Marcus Auer	10
(France) Romain Valadier-Picard	10
(Kyrgyzstan) Khanbolot Yrysbekov	00

Round of 32
(Belgium) Jorre Verstraeten	10
(Austria) Marcus Auer	00
(Italy) Angelo Pantano	01
(Kazakhstan) Magzhan Shamshadin	00
(Netherlands) Tornike Tsjakadoea	10
(France) Romain Valadier-Picard	00
(Mongolia) Enkhtaivany Ariunbold	10
(Czech Republic) David Pulkrábek	00

Round of 16
(Belgium) Jorre Verstraeten	00
(Italy) Angelo Pantano	01
(Netherlands) Tornike Tsjakadoea	00
(Mongolia) Enkhtaivany Ariunbold	10

Quarter-finals
(Italy) Angelo Pantano	01
(Mongolia) Enkhtaivany Ariunbold	11

=== Pool D ===
First round
(Israel) Yam Wolczak	10
(United States) Adonis Diaz	00
(Ivory Coast) Daouda Dabone	00
(Zambia) Simon Zulu	10
(Uzbekistan) Dilshodbek Baratov	10
Mohamad Akkash	00

Round of 32
(Georgia (country)) Lukhumi Chkhvimiani	00
(Israel) Yam Wolczak	10
(Zambia) Simon Zulu	10
(Turkmenistan) Aýbek Ömirow	00
(Ukraine) Artem Lesiuk	00
(Uzbekistan) Dilshodbek Baratov	11
(South Korea) Lee Ha-rim	10
(Portugal) Rodrigo Costa Lopes	00

Round of 16
(Israel) Yam Wolczak	01
(Zambia) Simon Zulu	00
(Uzbekistan) Dilshodbek Baratov	10
(South Korea) Lee Ha-rim	00

Quarter-finals
(Israel) Yam Wolczak	00
(Uzbekistan) Dilshodbek Baratov	01
