= 2023 European Judo Championships – Men's 60 kg =

Judo Men's 60 kg at the 2023 European Judo Championships
- Venue: Sud de France Arena
- Location: Montpellier, France
- Date: 3 November
- Competitors: 23 from 17 nations

Medalists
gold medal	Luka Mkheidze (1st title)	France
silver medal	Dilshot Khalmatov	Ukraine
bronze medal	Francisco Garrigós	Spain
bronze medal	Romain Valadier-Picard	France

Competition at external databases
- Links: IJF • JudoInside

The men's 60 kg competition at the 2023 European Judo Championships was held on 3 November at the Sud de France Arena.

== Results ==
=== Finals ===
Semi-finals
Romain Valadier-Picard (FRA)	00
Dilshot Khalmatov (UKR)	10
Luka Mkheidze (FRA)	01
Ramazan Abdulaev (AIN)	00 (yellow card)

Final
Dilshot Khalmatov (UKR)	00
Luka Mkheidze (FRA)	01 (yellow card)

=== Repechage ===
Repechage
Francisco Garrigós (ESP)	10 (yellow card)
Turan Bayramov (AZE)	00
Andrea Carlino (ITA)	00
Jorre Verstraeten (BEL)	10 (yellow card)

Bronze medal
Francisco Garrigós (ESP)	01
Ramazan Abdulaev (AIN)	00 (yellow card)
Jorre Verstraeten (BEL)	00
Romain Valadier-Picard (FRA)	10

=== Pool A ===
First round
David Štarkel (SLO)	00
Angelo Pantano (ITA)	10
Petros Christodoulides (CYP)	00 (yellow card)
Márton Andrási (HUN)	01 (yellow card)

Round of 16
Francisco Garrigós (ESP)	10
Angelo Pantano (ITA)	00
Romain Valadier-Picard (FRA)	01
Márton Andrási (HUN)	00 (yellow card)

Quarter-finals
Francisco Garrigós (ESP)	00
Romain Valadier-Picard (FRA)	10

=== Pool B ===
First round
Mohammad Rashnonezhad (IRT)	00
Tornike Tsjakadoea (NED)	10
Gamzat Zairbekov (AIN)	01 (yellow card)
Mihraç Akkuş (TUR)	00

Round of 16
Dilshot Khalmatov (UKR)	10 (yellow card)
Tornike Tsjakadoea (NED)	00
Turan Bayramov (AZE)	01
Gamzat Zairbekov (AIN)	00 (yellow card)

Quarter-finals
Dilshot Khalmatov (UKR)	01 (yellow card)
Turan Bayramov (AZE)	00

=== Pool C ===
First round
Andrea Carlino (ITA)	10
Rodrigo Costa Lopes (POR)	00
Artem Lesiuk (UKR)	01 (yellow card)
Yam Wolczak (ISR)	00 (yellow card)

Round of 16
Balabay Aghayev (AZE)	00
Andrea Carlino (ITA)	10
Luka Mkheidze (FRA)	11
Artem Lesiuk (UKR)	00 (yellow card)

Quarter-finals
Andrea Carlino (ITA)	00
Luka Mkheidze (FRA)	02

=== Pool D ===
First round
Ramazan Abdulaev (AIN)	10
Daniel Leutgeb (AUT)	00 (yellow card)

Round of 16
Giorgi Sardalashvili (GEO)	00
Ramazan Abdulaev (AIN)	10
Jorre Verstraeten (BEL)	10
Salih Yıldız (TUR)	00

Quarter-finals
Ramazan Abdulaev (AIN)	10
Jorre Verstraeten (BEL)	00
