= Judo at the 2024 Summer Olympics – Men's 60 kg =

Judo Men's 60 kg at the Games of the XXXIII Olympiad
- Venue: Grand Palais Éphémère
- Location: Paris, France
- Date: 27 July 2024
- Competitors: 25 from 25 nations
- Website: Official website

Medalists
gold medal	Yeldos Smetov (1st title)	Kazakhstan
silver medal	Luka Mkheidze	France
bronze medal	Ryuju Nagayama	Japan
bronze medal	Francisco Garrigós	Spain

Competition at external databases
- Links: IJF • JudoInside

The Men's 60 kg event in Judo at the 2024 Summer Olympics was held at the Grand Palais Éphémère in Paris, France on 27 July 2024.

Yeldos Smetov and Luka Mkheidze, who were both the 2020 bronze medalists, fought in the final. Smetov won and became the Olympic champion. Ryuju Nagayama and Francisco Garrigós won the bronze medals, with Nagayama going through the repechage.

== Results ==
=== Finals ===
Semi-finals
13 Yeldos Smetov (KAZ)	10
4 Francisco Garrigós (ESP)	00
7 Salih Yıldız (TUR)	00
3 Luka Mkheidze (FRA)	01

Final
13 Yeldos Smetov (KAZ)	01
3 Luka Mkheidze (FRA)	00

=== Repechage ===
Repechage
1 Yang Yung-wei (TPE)	00 (yellow card)
5 Ryuju Nagayama (JPN)	01
2 Giorgi Sardalashvili (GEO)	10
14 Kim Won-jin (KOR)	00

Bronze medal
5 Ryuju Nagayama (JPN)	10 (yellow card)
7 Salih Yıldız (TUR)	00
2 Giorgi Sardalashvili (GEO)	00 (yellow card)
4 Francisco Garrigós (ESP)	01

=== Pool A ===
First round
19 Josh Katz (AUS)	00 (yellow card)
18 Andrea Carlino (ITA)	01
8 Dilshot Khalmatov (UKR)	01 (yellow card)
10 Doston Ruziev (UZB)	00 (yellow card)
13 Yeldos Smetov (KAZ)	10
12 Tornike Tsjakadoea (NED)	00

Round of 16
1 Yang Yung-wei (TPE)	10 (yellow card)
18 Andrea Carlino (ITA)	01
8 Dilshot Khalmatov (UKR)	00
13 Yeldos Smetov (KAZ)	01 (yellow card)

Quarter-finals
1 Yang Yung-wei (TPE)	00 (yellow card)
13 Yeldos Smetov (KAZ)	01 (yellow card)

=== Pool B ===
First round
23 Jairo Moreno (ESA)	00 (yellow card)
11 Jorre Verstraeten (BEL)	01
24 Sebastián Sancho (CRC)	00
15 Michel Augusto (BRA)	01

Round of 16
4 Francisco Garrigós (ESP)	01
11 Jorre Verstraeten (BEL)	00
5 Ryuju Nagayama (JPN)	10 (yellow card)
15 Michel Augusto (BRA)	00

Quarter-finals
4 Francisco Garrigós (ESP)	10
5 Ryuju Nagayama (JPN)	00

=== Pool C ===
First round
22 Arnold Kisoka (COD)	00
16 Yam Wolczak (ISR)	10 (yellow card)
25 Hesham Makabr (YEM)	00
21 Ashley McKenzie (JAM)	10 (yellow card)

Round of 16
2 Giorgi Sardalashvili (GEO)	11
16 Yam Wolczak (ISR)	00
7 Salih Yıldız (TUR)	01
21 Ashley McKenzie (JAM)	00

Quarter-finals
2 Giorgi Sardalashvili (GEO)	00
7 Salih Yıldız (TUR)	01

=== Pool D ===
First round
17 Youssry Samy (EGY)	00
9 Enkhtaivany Ariunbold (MGL)	10
20 Simon Zulu (ZAM)	00
14 Kim Won-jin (KOR)	10

Round of 16
3 Luka Mkheidze (FRA)	10 (yellow card)
9 Enkhtaivany Ariunbold (MGL)	00
6 Balabay Aghayev (AZE)	00
14 Kim Won-jin (KOR)	10 (yellow card)

Quarter-finals
3 Luka Mkheidze (FRA)	01 (yellow card)
14 Kim Won-jin (KOR)	00
