= 2025 European Judo Championships – Men's 60 kg =

Judo competition

Judo Men's 60 kg at the 2025 European Judo Championships
- Venue: Morača Sports Center
- Location: Podgorica, Montenegro
- Date: 23 April 2025
- Competitors: 28 from 20 nations

Medalists
gold medal	Giorgi Sardalashvili (1st title)	Georgia
silver medal	Ayub Bliev
bronze medal	Ahmad Yusifov	Azerbaijan
bronze medal	Luka Mkheidze	France

Competition at external databases
- Links: IJF • JudoInside

The men's 60 kg competition at the 2025 European Judo Championships was held at the Morača Sports Center in Podgorica, Montenegro on 23 April 2025.

== Results ==
=== Finals ===
Semi-finals
(France) Luka Mkheidze	000 (yellow card)
(International Judo Federation) Ayub Bliev	020 (yellow card)
(Spain) Francisco Garrigós	000
(Georgia (country)) Giorgi Sardalashvili	100

Final
(International Judo Federation) Ayub Bliev	000 (yellow card)
(Georgia (country)) Giorgi Sardalashvili	001 (yellow card)

=== Repechage ===
Repechage
(Azerbaijan) Ahmad Yusifov	100
(Azerbaijan) Turan Bayramov	000
(Netherlands) Emiel Jaring	000
(Armenia) Ashik Andreyan	101

Bronze medal
(Azerbaijan) Ahmad Yusifov	100
(Spain) Francisco Garrigós	000 (yellow card)
(Armenia) Ashik Andreyan	000
(France) Luka Mkheidze	001 (yellow card)

=== Pool A ===
First round
(Bulgaria) Hristo Hristov	000 (yellow card)
(Poland) Ksawery Ignasiak	100 (yellow card)
(Azerbaijan) Ahmad Yusifov	100
(Israel) Izhak Ashpiz	000
(Spain) Luis Barroso López	000
(Romania) Alexandru Matei	100

Round of 16
(France) Luka Mkheidze	100 (yellow card)
(Poland) Ksawery Ignasiak	000 (yellow card)
(Azerbaijan) Ahmad Yusifov	100
(Romania) Alexandru Matei	000

Quarter-finals
(France) Luka Mkheidze	100
(Azerbaijan) Ahmad Yusifov	000

=== Pool B ===
First round
(Slovakia) Jozef Tomanek	001 (yellow card)
(Austria) Daniel Leutgeb	000
(Azerbaijan) Turan Bayramov	100
(Malta) James Zahra	000
(Hungary) Csanád Feczkó	001
(Moldova) Vladimir Iacomi	000

Round of 16
(International Judo Federation) Ayub Bliev	111 (yellow card)
(Slovakia) Jozef Tomanek	000
(Azerbaijan) Turan Bayramov	100
(Hungary) Csanád Feczkó	000

Quarter-finals
(International Judo Federation) Ayub Bliev	100
(Azerbaijan) Turan Bayramov	000

=== Pool C ===
First round
(Austria) Vache Adamyan	000
(Ukraine) Artem Lesiuk	020
(Netherlands) Emiel Jaring	010 (yellow card)
(Moldova) Alexandru Tîrsînă	000
(Italy) Andrea Carlino	000
(France) Enzo Jean	001

Round of 16
(Spain) Francisco Garrigós	001 (yellow card)
(Ukraine) Artem Lesiuk	000 (yellow card)
(Netherlands) Emiel Jaring	002
(France) Enzo Jean	000

Quarter-finals
(Spain) Francisco Garrigós	010
(Netherlands) Emiel Jaring	000

=== Pool D ===
First round
(Hungary) Márton Andrási	001
(Bulgaria) Ivan Simeonov	000 (yellow card)
(Belgium) Jorre Verstraeten	011
(Slovenia) David Štarkel	000
(Israel) Yehonatan Veksler	000
(Armenia) Ashik Andreyan	002

Round of 16
(Georgia (country)) Giorgi Sardalashvili	010 (yellow card)
(Hungary) Márton Andrási	000
(Belgium) Jorre Verstraeten	000
(Armenia) Ashik Andreyan	100

Quarter-finals
(Georgia (country)) Giorgi Sardalashvili	100 (yellow card)
(Armenia) Ashik Andreyan	000 (yellow card)
