= Judo at the 2022 Asian Games – Men's 60 kg =

Judo competition

Judo Men's 60 kg at the 2022 Asian Games
- Venue: Xiaoshan Linpu Gymnasium
- Location: Hangzhou, China
- Date: 24 September 2023

Medalists
gold medal	Yang Yung-wei	Chinese Taipei
silver medal	Lee Ha-rim	South Korea
bronze medal	Chae Kwang-jin	North Korea
bronze medal	Magzhan Shamshadin	Kazakhstan

Competition at external databases
- Links: IJF • JudoInside

The men's 60 kilograms (Extra lightweight) competition in Judo at the 2022 Asian Games in Hangzhou was held on 24 September 2023 at the Xiaoshan Linpu Gymnasium.

In the final, Yang Yung-wei from Chinese Taipei won the gold medal.

== Schedule ==
All times are China Standard Time (UTC+08:00)

Date	Time	Event
Sunday, 24 September 2023	10:00	Elimination round of 16
Sunday, 24 September 2023	10:00	Quarterfinals
Sunday, 24 September 2023	10:00	Repechage
Sunday, 24 September 2023	10:00	Semifinals
Sunday, 24 September 2023	16:00	Finals

== Results ==
=== Main bracket ===
==== Final ====
Final
Lee Ha-rim (KOR)	00 (yellow card)
Yang Yung-wei (TPE)	01 (yellow card)

==== Top half ====
Round of 32
Vikas B.K. (NEP)	10 (yellow card)
Volodymyr Guchkov (CAM)	00
Jetsadakorn Suksai (THA)	00
Chae Kwang-jin (PRK)	10

Round of 16
Lee Ha-rim (KOR)	10
Lai Yiu Long (HKG)	00 (yellow card)
Aýbek Omirow (TKM)	10
Vikas B.K. (NEP)	00
Dilshodbek Baratov (UZB)	00
Chae Kwang-jin (PRK)	10
Magzhan Shamshadin (KAZ)	10
Sayed Kamaluddin Divband (AFG)	00

Quarter-finals
Lee Ha-rim (KOR)	10
Aýbek Omirow (TKM)	00 (yellow card)
Chae Kwang-jin (PRK)	00
Magzhan Shamshadin (KAZ)	01

Semi-finals
Lee Ha-rim (KOR)	10
Magzhan Shamshadin (KAZ)	00

==== Bottom half ====
Round of 32
Khanbolot Yrysbekov (KGZ)	10
Soukphaxay Sitthisane (LAO)	00 (yellow card)

Round of 16
Enkhtaivany Ariunbold (MGL)	11
Chu Đức Đạt (VIE)	00
Mehrzod Sufiev (TJK)	10
Ngawang Namgyel (BHU)	00
Yang Yung-wei (TPE)	10
Khanbolot Yrysbekov (KGZ)	00
Hayato Kondo (JPN)	10
Meshal Al-Ali (KUW)	01 (yellow card)

Quarter-finals
Enkhtaivany Ariunbold (MGL)	11
Mehrzod Sufiev (TJK)	00 (yellow card)
Yang Yung-wei (TPE)	10
Hayato Kondo (JPN)	00

Semi-finals
Enkhtaivany Ariunbold (MGL)	00 (yellow card)
Yang Yung-wei (TPE)	10

=== Repechage ===
Repechage
Aýbek Omirow (TKM)	00
Chae Kwang-jin (PRK)	10
Mehrzod Sufiev (TJK)	10
Hayato Kondo (JPN)	00

Bronze medal
Chae Kwang-jin (PRK)	01
Enkhtaivany Ariunbold (MGL)	00
Mehrzod Sufiev (TJK)	00
Magzhan Shamshadin (KAZ)	01
