= Kazirbekiin Yolk =

Mongolian judoka (born 2000/01)

Personal information
- Native name: Казирбекийн Ёолк
- Born: 30 December 2000 (age 25)
- Occupation: Judoka

Sport
- Country: Mongolia
- Sport: Judo
- Weight class: ‍–‍60 kg, ‍–‍66 kg

Achievements and titles
- World Champ.: (bronze) (2025)
- Asian Champ.: 7th (2026)
Medal record
Men's judo
Representing Mongolia
World Championships
Bronze medal – third place	2025 Budapest	‍–‍60 kg
Asian Games
Gold medal – first place	2026 Aichi‑Nagoya	‍–‍66 kg

Profile at external databases
- IJF: 72201
- JudoInside.com: 162181
- Updated on 30 September 2026

Kazirbekiin (Kaderbekiin) Yolk (Mongolian: Казирбекийн (Кадербекийн) Ёолк; born 30 December 2000) is a Mongolian judoka who competes in the super lightweight category (up to 60 kg). He won a bronze medal in the men's 60 kg event at the 2025 World Judo Championships held in Budapest.

== Biography ==
The family of Yolk resides near Darkhan.

== Career ==
Prior to the world championships in 2025, Yolk's best results were finishing in 7th place in the 2023 Grand Slam Ulaanbaatar in 60 kg weight class and 5th place in the 2024 Grand Slam Tokyo. At the 2025 World Championships, he competed in the men's 60 kg event despite being a complete underdog. Yolk defeated Jonathan Yang and Jhonathan Benavides en route to the quarter-finals. In that round, he lost to the Ayub Bliev, who also went on to win a bronze medal. In the dispute for the bronze medal, Yolk faced Michel Augusto, winning the bout as a result of Augusto suffering an injury (an ankle sprain) as well as excessive shidos (punishments).

Yolk is currently ranked 59th in the IJF world rankings with 650 points (as of June 2025).
