= Kana Tomizawa =

Japanese judoka (born 1999)

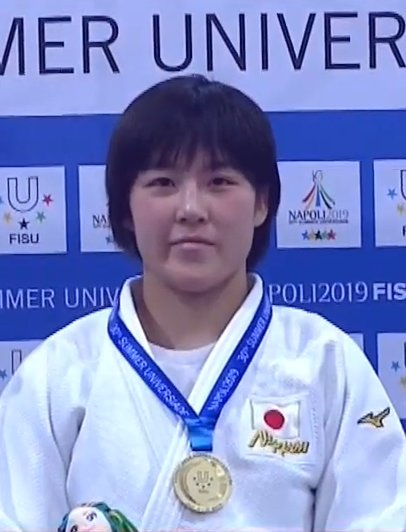
- Tomizawa in 2019

Personal information
- Born: 6 July 1999 (age 26)
- Occupation: Judoka

Sport
- Country: Japan
- Sport: Judo
- Weight class: –57 kg
Medal record
Women's judo
Representing Japan
Asian Championships
Silver medal – second place	2019 Fujairah	–57 kg
Summer Universiade
Gold medal – first place	2019 Naples	–57 kg
Gold medal – first place	2019 Naples	Women's team
World Juniors Championships
Bronze medal – third place	2018 Nassau	–57 kg
World Cadets Championships
Gold medal – first place	2015 Sarajevo	–52 kg

Profile at external databases
- IJF: 23625
- JudoInside.com: 97064

Kana Tomizawa (born 6 July 1999) is a Japanese judoka. She won the gold medal in the women's lightweight (–57 kg) event at the 2019 Summer Universiade held in Naples, Italy. She also won the gold medal in the women's team event.

In 2019, she won the silver medal in the women's –57 kg event at the Asian-Pacific Judo Championships held in Fujairah, United Arab Emirates.
