= 2022 Judo Grand Slam Abu Dhabi =

Judo competition

Judo 2022 Judo Grand Slam Abu Dhabi
- Venue: Mubadala Arena
- Location: Abu Dhabi, United Arab Emirates
- Dates: 21–23 October 2022
- Competitors: 414 from 65 nations
- Total prize money: €154,000

Competition at external databases
- Links: IJF • EJU • JudoInside

The 2022 Judo Grand Slam Abu Dhabi was held at the Jiu-Jitsu Arena in Abu Dhabi, United Arab Emirates, from 21 to 23 October 2022 as part of the IJF World Tour and during the 2024 Summer Olympics qualification period.

== Medal summary ==
=== Men's events ===
Event	Gold	Silver	Bronze
Extra-lightweight (−60 kg)	Giorgi Sardalashvili (GEO)	Yang Yung-wei (TPE)	Salih Yıldız (TUR)
Extra-lightweight (−60 kg)	Giorgi Sardalashvili (GEO)	Yang Yung-wei (TPE)	Balabay Aghayev (AZE)
Half-lightweight (−66 kg)	Elios Manzi (ITA)	Strahinja Bunčić (SRB)	Yeset Kuanov (KAZ)
Half-lightweight (−66 kg)	Elios Manzi (ITA)	Strahinja Bunčić (SRB)	Matteo Piras (ITA)
Lightweight (−73 kg)	Nils Stump (SUI)	Giovanni Esposito (ITA)	Shakhram Akhadov (UZB)
Lightweight (−73 kg)	Nils Stump (SUI)	Giovanni Esposito (ITA)	Salvador Cases (ESP)
Half-middleweight (−81 kg)	Nicolas Chilard (FRA)	José María Mendiola (ESP)	Zelim Tckaev (AZE)
Half-middleweight (−81 kg)	Nicolas Chilard (FRA)	José María Mendiola (ESP)	Mihail Latișev (MDA)
Middleweight (−90 kg)	Beka Gviniashvili (GEO)	Loris Tassier (FRA)	Jesper Smink (NED)
Middleweight (−90 kg)	Beka Gviniashvili (GEO)	Loris Tassier (FRA)	Nemanja Majdov (SRB)
Half-heavyweight (−100 kg)	Kyle Reyes (CAN)	Nikoloz Sherazadishvili (ESP)	Aleksandar Kukolj (SRB)
Half-heavyweight (−100 kg)	Kyle Reyes (CAN)	Nikoloz Sherazadishvili (ESP)	Shady El Nahas (CAN)
Heavyweight (+100 kg)	Lukáš Krpálek (CZE)	Jur Spijkers (NED)	Enej Marinič (SLO)
Heavyweight (+100 kg)	Lukáš Krpálek (CZE)	Jur Spijkers (NED)	Temur Rakhimov (TJK)

=== Women's events ===
Event	Gold	Silver	Bronze
Extra-lightweight (−48 kg)	Julia Figueroa (ESP)	Francesca Milani (ITA)	Guo Zongying (CHN)
Extra-lightweight (−48 kg)	Julia Figueroa (ESP)	Francesca Milani (ITA)	Abiba Abuzhakynova (KAZ)
Half-lightweight (−52 kg)	Astride Gneto (FRA)	Diyora Keldiyorova (UZB)	Gefen Primo (ISR)
Half-lightweight (−52 kg)	Astride Gneto (FRA)	Diyora Keldiyorova (UZB)	Odette Giuffrida (ITA)
Lightweight (−57 kg)	Huh Mi-mi (KOR)	Nora Gjakova (KOS)	Marica Perišić (SRB)
Lightweight (−57 kg)	Huh Mi-mi (KOR)	Nora Gjakova (KOS)	Eteri Liparteliani (GEO)
Half-middleweight (−63 kg)	Lucy Renshall (GBR)	Bárbara Timo (POR)	Gili Sharir (ISR)
Half-middleweight (−63 kg)	Lucy Renshall (GBR)	Bárbara Timo (POR)	Joanne van Lieshout (NED)
Middleweight (−70 kg)	Elisavet Teltsidou (GRE)	Gabriella Willems (BEL)	Katie-Jemima Yeats-Brown (GBR)
Middleweight (−70 kg)	Elisavet Teltsidou (GRE)	Gabriella Willems (BEL)	Martina Esposito (ITA)
Half-heavyweight (−78 kg)	Ma Zhenzhao (CHN)	Natalie Powell (GBR)	Loriana Kuka (KOS)
Half-heavyweight (−78 kg)	Ma Zhenzhao (CHN)	Natalie Powell (GBR)	Anna Monta Olek (GER)
Heavyweight (+78 kg)	Su Xin (CHN)	Sophio Somkhishvili (GEO)	Léa Fontaine (FRA)
Heavyweight (+78 kg)	Su Xin (CHN)	Sophio Somkhishvili (GEO)	Rochele Nunes (POR)

Source Results

=== Medal table ===
* Host nation (United Arab Emirates)

Rank	Nation	Gold	Silver	Bronze	Total
1	France (FRA)	2	1	1	4
1	Georgia (GEO)	2	1	1	4
3	China (CHN)	2	0	1	3
4	Italy (ITA)	1	2	3	6
5	Spain (ESP)	1	2	1	4
6	Great Britain (GBR)	1	1	1	3
7	Canada (CAN)	1	0	1	2
8	Czech Republic (CZE)	1	0	0	1
8	Greece (GRE)	1	0	0	1
8	South Korea (KOR)	1	0	0	1
8	Switzerland (SUI)	1	0	0	1
12	Serbia (SRB)	0	1	3	4
13	Netherlands (NED)	0	1	2	3
14	Kosovo (KOS)	0	1	1	2
14	Portugal (POR)	0	1	1	2
14	Uzbekistan (UZB)	0	1	1	2
17	Belgium (BEL)	0	1	0	1
17	Chinese Taipei (TPE)	0	1	0	1
19	Azerbaijan (AZE)	0	0	2	2
19	Israel (ISR)	0	0	2	2
19	Kazakhstan (KAZ)	0	0	2	2
22	Germany (GER)	0	0	1	1
22	Moldova (MDA)	0	0	1	1
22	Slovenia (SLO)	0	0	1	1
22	Tajikistan (TJK)	0	0	1	1
22	Turkey (TUR)	0	0	1	1
Totals (26 entries)		14	14	28	56

== Prize money ==
The sums written are per medalist, bringing the total prizes awarded to €154,000. (retrieved from:)

Medal	Total	Judoka	Coach
Gold	€5,000	€4,000	€1,000
Silver	€3,000	€2,400	€600
Bronze	€1,500	€1,200	€300
