= Mongolia at the 2019 Summer Universiade =

- Flag of Mongolia
- IOC code: MGL

in Naples, Italy 3 July 2019 – 14 July 2019
- Medals: Gold 0 Silver 1 Bronze 1 Total 2

Summer Universiade appearances
- 1959; 1961; 1963; 1965; 1967; 1970; 1973; 1975; 1977; 1979; 1981; 1983; 1985; 1987; 1989; 1991; 1993; 1995; 1997; 1999; 2001; 2003; 2005; 2007; 2009; 2011; 2013; 2015; 2017; 2019; 2021; 2025; 2027

Mongolia competed at the 2019 Summer Universiade in Naples, Italy held from 3 to 14 July 2019. The country won one silver medal and one bronze medal.

== Medal summary ==
=== Medal by sports ===
Medals by sport
Judo	0	0	1	1
Taekwondo	0	1	0	1
Total	0	1	1	2

=== Medalists ===
Medal	Name	Sport	Event	Date
Silver	Tumenbayar Molom	Taekwondo	Men's flyweight –58 kg	July 10
Bronze	Baasanjargal Bayarbat	Judo	Women's welterweight –63 kg	July 5
