= Charlie Ayre =

British judoka (born 2005)

Personal information
- Born: 1 December 2005 (age 20) Middlesbrough, England
- Occupation: Judoka

Sport
- Country: Great Britain
- Sport: Judo
- Weight class: ‍–‍60 kg

Achievements and titles
- World Champ.: R32 (2026)
- European Champ.: R16 (2026)
- Commonwealth Games: (bronze) (2026)
Medal record
Men's judo
Representing England
Commonwealth Games
Bronze medal – third place	2026 Glasgow	‍–‍60 kg

Profile at external databases
- IJF: 66332
- JudoInside.com: 117951
- Updated on 4 October 2026

Charlie Ayre (born 1 December 2005) is a British judoka. He won a bronze medal at the 2026 Commonwealth Games.

== Biography ==
From Marton, Middlesbrough, Ayre won as a nine year-old at the 2015 British Championships for Minors in Walsall, a championship at which his father Paul Ayre had also won at the same age.

In 2025, he won gold at the Birmingham Junior Cup and the following year represented Great Britain at the 2026 European Judo Championships.

Ayre won a first Grand Prix medal with silver in Qingdao in June 2026. At the age of 20 years-old, he was the youngest member of the England team selected for Judo at the 2026 Commonwealth Games. At the Games in Glasgow, Scotland, he was a bronze medalist in the men's 60kg division. To win the bronze medal he defeated Kenyan national champion Regan Wali in the bronze medal match with a chokehold ipon within 2:49 of the start of the bout.
