= Khikmatillokh Turaev =

Uzbekistani judoka (born 1995)

Personal information
- Born: 25 May 1995 (age 31)
- Occupation: Judoka

Sport
- Country: Uzbekistan
- Sport: Judo
- Weight class: ‍–‍73 kg

Achievements and titles
- Olympic Games: R16 (2020)
- World Champ.: 5th (2021)
- Asian Champ.: (bronze) (2019)
Medal record
Men's judo
Representing Uzbekistan
Asian Championships
Bronze medal – third place	2019 Fujairah	‍–‍73 kg
World Masters
Bronze medal – third place	2021 Doha	‍–‍73 kg
IJF Grand Slam
Silver medal – second place	2021 Abu Dhabi	‍–‍73 kg
Bronze medal – third place	2019 Abu Dhabi	‍–‍73 kg
Bronze medal – third place	2020 Paris	‍–‍73 kg
IJF Grand Prix
Gold medal – first place	2018 Tashkent	‍–‍73 kg
Gold medal – first place	2019 Tashkent	‍–‍73 kg
Bronze medal – third place	2017 Tashkent	‍–‍73 kg
Bronze medal – third place	2019 Marrakesh	‍–‍73 kg
Bronze medal – third place	2019 Budapest	‍–‍73 kg
Summer Universiade
Bronze medal – third place	2019 Naples	‍–‍73 kg
Military World Games
Gold medal – first place	2019 Wuhan	‍–‍73 kg

Profile at external databases
- IJF: 24510
- JudoInside.com: 97547
- Updated on 20 November 2022

Khikmatillokh Turaev (born 25 May 1995) is an Uzbekistani judoka. He won the gold medal in the men's 73 kg event at the 2019 Military World Games held in Wuhan, China.

At the 2019 Asian-Pacific Judo Championships held in Fujairah, United Arab Emirates, Turaev won one of the bronze medals in the men's 73 kg event. At the 2019 Summer Universiade held in Naples, Italy, he also won one of the bronze medals in the men's 73 kg event. In the same year, he also competed in the men's 73 kg event at the 2019 World Judo Championships held in Tokyo, Japan where he was eliminated in his first match by Mohamed Mohyeldin of Egypt.

In January 2021, Turaev won one of the bronze medals in his event at the Judo World Masters held in Doha, Qatar. In June 2021, he lost his bronze medal match in the men's 73 kg event at the 2021 World Championships held in Budapest, Hungary.

Turaev competed in the men's 73 kg event at the 2020 Summer Olympics in Tokyo, Japan. He was eliminated in his second match by An Chang-rim of South Korea. At the 2021 Judo Grand Slam Abu Dhabi held in Abu Dhabi, United Arab Emirates, he won the silver medal in his event.
