= 2024 European Judo Championships – Men's 60 kg =

Judo competition

Judo Men's 60 kg at the 2024 European Judo Championships
- Venue: Arena Zagreb
- Location: Zagreb, Croatia
- Date: 25 April
- Competitors: 25 from 20 nations

Medalists
gold medal	Francisco Garrigós (3rd title)	Spain
silver medal	Balabay Aghayev	Azerbaijan
bronze medal	Cédric Revol	France
bronze medal	Salih Yıldız	Turkey

Competition at external databases
- Links: IJF • JudoInside

The men's 60 kg competition at the 2024 European Judo Championships was held on 25 April at the Arena Zagreb.

== Results ==
=== Finals ===
Semi-finals
Francisco Garrigós (ESP)	10 (yellow card)
Salih Yıldız (TUR)	00
Balabay Aghayev (AZE)	10 (yellow card)
Cédric Revol (FRA)	00

Final
Francisco Garrigós (ESP)	10 (yellow card)
Balabay Aghayev (AZE)	00 (yellow card)

=== Repechage ===
Repechage
Jorre Verstraeten (BEL)	00
Artem Lesiuk (UKR)	01 (yellow card)
Turan Bayramov (AZE)	01
Ramazan Abdulaev (AIN)	00 (yellow card)

Bronze medal
Artem Lesiuk (UKR)	00
Cédric Revol (FRA)	10
Turan Bayramov (AZE)	00
Salih Yıldız (TUR)	10 (yellow card)

=== Pool A ===
First round
Andrea Carlino (ITA)	10
Ashik Andreyan (ARM)	01
Jorre Verstraeten (BEL)	10
Christos Pintsis (GRE)	00 (yellow card)
Ariel Shulman (ISR)	11
Emiel Jaring (NED)	00

Round of 16
Francisco Garrigós (ESP)	02
Andrea Carlino (ITA)	00
Jorre Verstraeten (BEL)	10 (yellow card)
Ariel Shulman (ISR)	00 (yellow card)

Quarter-finals
Francisco Garrigós (ESP)	10
Jorre Verstraeten (BEL)	00

=== Pool B ===
First round
David Štarkel (SLO)	00
Artem Lesiuk (UKR)	02
~~Mohammad Akkash (IRT)~~
Alexandru Tîrsînă (MDA)	w/o

Round of 16
Romain Valadier-Picard (FRA)	00
Artem Lesiuk (UKR)	10
Salih Yıldız (TUR)	10
Alexandru Tîrsînă (MDA)	00

Quarter-finals
Artem Lesiuk (UKR)	00
Salih Yıldız (TUR)	02

=== Pool C ===
First round
Márton Andrási (HUN)	00
Angelo Pantano (ITA)	11
Turan Bayramov (AZE)	01 (yellow card)
Vache Adamyan (AUT)	00
Luis Barroso López (ESP)	01
Petros Christodoulides (CYP)	00 (yellow card)

Round of 16
Balabay Aghayev (AZE)	01
Angelo Pantano (ITA)	00
Turan Bayramov (AZE)	10
Luis Barroso López (ESP)	00

Quarter-finals
Balabay Aghayev (AZE)	10 (yellow card)
Turan Bayramov (AZE)	00

=== Pool D ===
First round
Egilsten Amarasekara (NOR)	00
Rodrigo Lopes (POR)	10 (yellow card)
Ramazan Abdulaev (AIN)	10
Nazar Viskov (UKR)	00 (yellow card)
~~Tornike Tsjakadoea (NED)~~
James Zahra (MLT)	w/o

Round of 16
Cédric Revol (FRA)	01
Rodrigo Lopes (POR)	00
Ramazan Abdulaev (AIN)	10
James Zahra (MLT)	00 (yellow card)

Quarter-finals
Cédric Revol (FRA)	02 (yellow card)
Ramazan Abdulaev (AIN)	01 (yellow card)
