= Judo at the 2018 Asian Games – Men's 60 kg =

Judo competition

Men's 60 kg at the 2018 Asian Games
- Venue: Jakarta Convention Center
- Date: 29 August 2018
- Competitors: 17 from 17 nations

Medalists
gold medal	Diyorbek Urozboev	Uzbekistan
silver medal	Toru Shishime	Japan
bronze medal	Yang Yung-wei	Chinese Taipei
bronze medal	Lee Ha-rim	South Korea

The men's 60 kilograms (Extra lightweight) competition at the 2018 Asian Games in Jakarta was held on 29 August at the Jakarta Convention Center Assembly Hall.

== Schedule ==
All times are Western Indonesia Time (UTC+07:00)

Date	Time	Event
Wednesday, 29 August 2018	09:00	Elimination round of 32
Wednesday, 29 August 2018	09:00	Elimination round of 16
Wednesday, 29 August 2018	09:00	Quarterfinals
Wednesday, 29 August 2018	09:00	Repechage
Wednesday, 29 August 2018	09:00	Semifinals
Wednesday, 29 August 2018	16:00	Finals

== Results ==
=== Main bracket ===
==== Final ====
Gold medal contest
Diyorbek Urozboev (UZB)	01
Toru Shishime (JPN)	00

==== Top half ====
Elimination round of 32
Yu Kin Ting (HKG)	00
Soukphaxay Sithisane (LAO)	10

Elimination round of 16
Dashdavaagiin Amartüvshin (MGL)	10
Lio Chon Hou (MAC)	00
Lee Ha-rim (KOR)	10
Soukphaxay Sithisane (LAO)	00
Diyorbek Urozboev (UZB)	10
Vijay Kumar Yadav (IND)	00
Yang Yung-wei (TPE)	10
Ali Khousrof (YEM)	00

Quarterfinals
Dashdavaagiin Amartüvshin (MGL)	00
Lee Ha-rim (KOR)	10
Diyorbek Urozboev (UZB)	10
Yang Yung-wei (TPE)	01

Semifinals
Lee Ha-rim (KOR)	00
Diyorbek Urozboev (UZB)	01

==== Bottom half ====
Elimination round of 32

Elimination round of 16
Yeldos Smetov (KAZ)	10
Muhammad Alfiansyah Lubis (INA)	00
Otar Bestaev (KGZ)	00
An Jae-yong (PRK)	10
Toru Shishime (JPN)	11
Phou Khi Phok (CAM)	00
Sukhrob Boqiev (TJK)	00
Shang Yi (CHN)	01

Quarterfinals
Yeldos Smetov (KAZ)	00
An Jae-yong (PRK)	10
Toru Shishime (JPN)	10
Shang Yi (CHN)	00

Semifinals
An Jae-yong (PRK)	00
Toru Shishime (JPN)	01

=== Repechage ===
Repechage
Dashdavaagiin Amartüvshin (MGL)	00
Yang Yung-wei (TPE)	10
Yeldos Smetov (KAZ)	00
Shang Yi (CHN)	10

Bronze medal contests
Yang Yung-wei (TPE)	10
An Jae-yong (PRK)	00
Shang Yi (CHN)	00
Lee Ha-rim (KOR)	01
