= 2019 Asian-Pacific Judo Championships =

Judo competition

2019 Asian Judo Championships
- Host city: Fujairah, United Arab Emirates
- Dates: 20–23 April
- Main venue: Sheikh Zayed Sports Complex

The 2019 Asian Judo Championships were the 24th edition of the Asian Judo Championships, and were held in Fujairah, United Arab Emirates from April 20 to April 23, 2019.

== Medal summary ==
=== Men ===
Event	Gold	Silver	Bronze
Extra lightweight −60 kg	Genki Koga; Japan	Yang Yung-wei; Chinese Taipei	Enkhtaivany Ariunbold; Mongolia
Extra lightweight −60 kg	Genki Koga; Japan	Yang Yung-wei; Chinese Taipei	Gusman Kyrgyzbayev; Kazakhstan
Half lightweight −66 kg	Yerlan Serikzhanov; Kazakhstan	Yeldos Zhumakanov; Kazakhstan	Yondonperenlein Baskhüü; Mongolia
Half lightweight −66 kg	Yerlan Serikzhanov; Kazakhstan	Yeldos Zhumakanov; Kazakhstan	Artur Te; Kyrgyzstan
Lightweight −73 kg	Tsend-Ochiryn Tsogtbaatar; Mongolia	An Chang-rim; South Korea	Victor Scvortov; United Arab Emirates
Lightweight −73 kg	Tsend-Ochiryn Tsogtbaatar; Mongolia	An Chang-rim; South Korea	Khikmatillokh Turaev; Uzbekistan
Half middleweight −81 kg	Otgonbaataryn Uuganbaatar; Mongolia	Sharofiddin Boltaboev; Uzbekistan	Lee Sung-ho; South Korea
Half middleweight −81 kg	Otgonbaataryn Uuganbaatar; Mongolia	Sharofiddin Boltaboev; Uzbekistan	Hikaru Tomokiyo; Japan
Middleweight −90 kg	Kosuke Mashiyama; Japan	Komronshokh Ustopiriyon; Tajikistan	Islam Bozbayev; Kazakhstan
Middleweight −90 kg	Kosuke Mashiyama; Japan	Komronshokh Ustopiriyon; Tajikistan	Bu Hebilige; China
Half heavyweight −100 kg	Lkhagvasürengiin Otgonbaatar; Mongolia	Won Jong-hoon; South Korea	Mukhammadkarim Khurramov; Uzbekistan
Half heavyweight −100 kg	Lkhagvasürengiin Otgonbaatar; Mongolia	Won Jong-hoon; South Korea	Kayhan Ozcicek-Takagi; Australia
Heavyweight +100 kg	Kim Sung-min; South Korea	Temur Rakhimov; Tajikistan	Kim Min-jong; South Korea
Heavyweight +100 kg	Kim Sung-min; South Korea	Temur Rakhimov; Tajikistan	Iurii Krakovetskii; Kyrgyzstan

=== Women ===
Event	Gold	Silver	Bronze
Extra lightweight −48 kg	Li Yanan; China	Galbadrakhyn Otgontsetseg; Kazakhstan	Aya Sakagami; Japan
Extra lightweight −48 kg	Li Yanan; China	Galbadrakhyn Otgontsetseg; Kazakhstan	Lee Hye-kyeong; South Korea
Half lightweight −52 kg	Diyora Keldiyorova; Uzbekistan	Lkhagvasürengiin Sosorbaram; Mongolia	Rina Tatsukawa; Japan
Half lightweight −52 kg	Diyora Keldiyorova; Uzbekistan	Lkhagvasürengiin Sosorbaram; Mongolia	Rim Song-sim; North Korea
Lightweight −57 kg	Kim Jin-a; North Korea	Kana Tomizawa; Japan	Sevara Nishanbayeva; Kazakhstan
Lightweight −57 kg	Kim Jin-a; North Korea	Kana Tomizawa; Japan	Lkhagvatogoogiin Enkhriilen; Mongolia
Half middleweight −63 kg	Yang Junxia; China	Boldyn Gankhaich; Mongolia	Tang Jing; China
Half middleweight −63 kg	Yang Junxia; China	Boldyn Gankhaich; Mongolia	Katharina Haecker; Australia
Middleweight −70 kg	Shiho Tanaka; Japan	Gulnoza Matniyazova; Uzbekistan	You Je-young; South Korea
Middleweight −70 kg	Shiho Tanaka; Japan	Gulnoza Matniyazova; Uzbekistan	Aoife Coughlan; Australia
Half heavyweight −78 kg	Mao Izumi; Japan	Ma Zhenzhao; China	Yoon Hyun-ji; South Korea
Half heavyweight −78 kg	Mao Izumi; Japan	Ma Zhenzhao; China	Lee Jeong-yun; South Korea
Heavyweight +78 kg	Kim Min-jeong; South Korea	Han Mi-jin; South Korea	Wang Yan; China
Heavyweight +78 kg	Kim Min-jeong; South Korea	Han Mi-jin; South Korea	Akari Inoue; Japan

=== Mixed ===
Event	Gold	Silver	Bronze
Team	Japan	South Korea	China
Team	Japan	South Korea	Mongolia

== Medal table ==
Rank	Nation	Gold	Silver	Bronze	Total
1	Japan	5	1	4	10
2	Mongolia	3	2	4	9
3	South Korea	2	4	6	12
4	China	2	1	4	7
5	Kazakhstan	1	2	3	6
6	Uzbekistan	1	2	2	5
7	North Korea	1	0	1	2
8	Tajikistan	0	2	0	2
9	Chinese Taipei	0	1	0	1
10	Australia	0	0	3	3
11	Kyrgyzstan	0	0	2	2
12	United Arab Emirates	0	0	1	1
Totals (12 entries)		15	15	30	60
