= Yam Wolczak =

Israeli judoka

Personal information
- Native name: ים וולצ'ק
- Born: 7 May 2003 (age 23)
- Occupation: Judoka
- Height: 160 cm (5 ft 3 in)

Sport
- Country: Israel
- Sport: Judo
- Weight class: ‍–‍60 kg
- Rank: 2nd dan black belt

Achievements and titles
- Olympic Games: R16 (2024)
- World Champ.: 5th (2022)
- European Champ.: R32 (2022, 2023)
Medal record
Men's judo
Representing Israel
IJF Grand Slam
Silver medal – second place	2024 Tbilisi	‍–‍60 kg
European Junior Championships
Bronze medal – third place	2022 Prague	‍–‍60 kg

Profile at external databases
- IJF: 50682
- JudoInside.com: 134184
- Updated on 4 May 2025

Yam Wolczak (Hebrew: ים וולצ'ק; born 7 May 2003) is an Israeli judoka. He competes in the ‍–‍60 kg weight class. He won a 2022 European Junior Championships bronze medal. Wolczak represented Israel at the 2024 Summer Olympics in judo; in the men's 60 kg event he came in ninth, and in the mixed team event Team Israel also came in ninth.

== Judo career ==
=== 2019–present; European Junior Championships bronze medal ===
In 2019, Wolczak won bronze medals at the 2019 Fuengirola Cadet European Cup 2019 in Spain in February, and the 2019 Berlin Cadet European Cup in Germany in April.

At the 2020 Fuengirola Cadet European Cup in February, Wolczak won the bronze medal. At the 2021 Israeli U21 Championships in Ra'anana in June, he won the gold medal.

Wolczak placed 5th in the men's 60 kg event at the 2022 World Championships in Tashkent, Uzbekistan. At the 2022 European Junior Championships in Prague in the Czech Republic in September he won the bronze medal. At the 2022 Athens Junior European Cup in Greece in March he won the gold medal.

Wolczak competed at the 2023 Israeli Championships in Eilat in January, winning the gold medal. Wolczak competed at the 2023 Sarajevo European Open in Bosnia and Herzegovina in September, winning the gold medal.

Wolczak won a silver medal at the 2024 Tbilisi Grand Slam in Georgia in March, at 20 years old. He was selected to represent Israel at the 2024 Summer Olympics.

=== 2024 Paris Olympics ===
Wolczak represented Israel at the 2024 Summer Olympics in judo. In the men's 60 kg event he came in 9th, as in the first round he beat Arnold Kisoka from the Democratic Republic of Congo in 1:17, 10–0, but in the round of 16 he was defeated by 2024 world champion Giorgi Sardalashvili of Georgia in 2:42, 11–0. In the mixed team event, Team Israel also came in 9th.
