= 2024 Judo Grand Prix Linz =

Judo competition

Judo 2024 Judo Grand Prix Linz
- Venue: TipsArena Linz
- Location: Linz, Austria
- Dates: 8–10 March 2024
- Competitors: 528 from 78 nations
- Total prize money: €98,000

Competition at external databases
- Links: IJF • EJU • JudoInside

The 2024 Judo Grand Prix Linz was held at the TipsArena Linz in Linz, Austria, from 8 to 10 March 2024 as part of the IJF World Tour and during the 2024 Summer Olympics qualification period.

== Medal summary ==
=== Men's events ===
Event	Gold	Silver	Bronze
Extra-lightweight (−60 kg)	Francisco Garrigós (ESP)	Cédric Revol (FRA)	Dilshot Khalmatov (UKR)
Extra-lightweight (−60 kg)	Francisco Garrigós (ESP)	Cédric Revol (FRA)	Tornike Tsjakadoea (NED)
Half-lightweight (−66 kg)	Keita Hadano (JPN)	Baruch Shmailov (ISR)	Bogdan Iadov (UKR)
Half-lightweight (−66 kg)	Keita Hadano (JPN)	Baruch Shmailov (ISR)	Ismail Misirov (AIN)
Lightweight (−73 kg)	Adil Osmanov (MDA)	Rashid Mammadaliyev (AZE)	Jack Yonezuka (USA)
Lightweight (−73 kg)	Adil Osmanov (MDA)	Rashid Mammadaliyev (AZE)	Ioan Dzițac (ROU)
Half-middleweight (−81 kg)	Antonio Esposito (ITA)	Paweł Drzymał (POL)	Joji Togo (JPN)
Half-middleweight (−81 kg)	Antonio Esposito (ITA)	Paweł Drzymał (POL)	João Fernando (POR)
Middleweight (−90 kg)	Iván Felipe Silva Morales (CUB)	Tristani Mosakhlishvili (ESP)	Giorgi Jabniashvili (GEO)
Middleweight (−90 kg)	Iván Felipe Silva Morales (CUB)	Tristani Mosakhlishvili (ESP)	Li Kochman (ISR)
Half-heavyweight (−100 kg)	Leonardo Gonçalves (BRA)	Jorge Fonseca (POR)	Rafael Buzacarini (BRA)
Half-heavyweight (−100 kg)	Leonardo Gonçalves (BRA)	Jorge Fonseca (POR)	Laurin Boehler (AUT)
Heavyweight (+100 kg)	Lukáš Krpálek (CZE)	Andy Granda (CUB)	Guram Tushishvili (GEO)
Heavyweight (+100 kg)	Lukáš Krpálek (CZE)	Andy Granda (CUB)	Losseni Kone (GER)

Source results:

=== Women's events ===
Event	Gold	Silver	Bronze
Extra-lightweight (−48 kg)	Mitsuki Kondo (JPN)	Wakana Inagaki (JPN)	Amber Gersjes (NED)
Extra-lightweight (−48 kg)	Mitsuki Kondo (JPN)	Wakana Inagaki (JPN)	Lee Hye-kyeong (KOR)
Half-lightweight (−52 kg)	Larissa Pimenta (BRA)	Binta Ndiaye (SUI)	Naomi van Krevel (NED)
Half-lightweight (−52 kg)	Larissa Pimenta (BRA)	Binta Ndiaye (SUI)	Maria Siderot (POR)
Lightweight (−57 kg)	Marica Perišić (SRB)	Julie Beurskens (NED)	Mina Libeer (BEL)
Lightweight (−57 kg)	Marica Perišić (SRB)	Julie Beurskens (NED)	Kaja Kajzer (SLO)
Half-middleweight (−63 kg)	Joanne van Lieshout (NED)	Agatha Schmidt (GER)	Katharina Haecker (AUS)
Half-middleweight (−63 kg)	Joanne van Lieshout (NED)	Agatha Schmidt (GER)	Minami Aono (JPN)
Middleweight (−70 kg)	María Pérez (PUR)	Irene Pedrotti (ITA)	Aleksandra Samardžić (BIH)
Middleweight (−70 kg)	María Pérez (PUR)	Irene Pedrotti (ITA)	Michaela Polleres (AUT)
Half-heavyweight (−78 kg)	Anna Monta Olek (GER)	Yuliia Kurchenko (UKR)	Yelyzaveta Lytvynenko (UKR)
Half-heavyweight (−78 kg)	Anna Monta Olek (GER)	Yuliia Kurchenko (UKR)	Karla Prodan (CRO)
Heavyweight (+78 kg)	Beatriz Souza (BRA)	Marit Kamps (NED)	Idalys Ortiz (CUB)
Heavyweight (+78 kg)	Beatriz Souza (BRA)	Marit Kamps (NED)	Milica Žabić (SRB)

Source results:

=== Medal table ===
* Host nation (Austria)

Rank	Nation	Gold	Silver	Bronze	Total
1	Brazil (BRA)	3	0	1	4
2	Japan (JPN)	2	1	2	5
3	Netherlands (NED)	1	2	3	6
4	Cuba (CUB)	1	1	1	3
5	Italy (ITA)	1	1	0	2
5	Spain (ESP)	1	1	0	2
7	Ukraine (UKR)	1	0	3	4
8	Serbia (SRB)	1	0	1	2
9	Czech Republic (CZE)	1	0	0	1
9	Moldova (MDA)	1	0	0	1
9	Puerto Rico (PUR)	1	0	0	1
12	Germany (GER)	0	2	1	3
13	Portugal (POR)	0	1	2	3
14	Israel (ISR)	0	1	1	2
15	Azerbaijan (AZE)	0	1	0	1
15	France (FRA)	0	1	0	1
15	Poland (POL)	0	1	0	1
15	Switzerland (SUI)	0	1	0	1
19	Austria (AUT)*	0	0	2	2
19	Georgia (GEO)	0	0	2	2
21	Australia (AUS)	0	0	1	1
21	Belgium (BEL)	0	0	1	1
21	Bosnia and Herzegovina (BIH)	0	0	1	1
21	Croatia (CRO)	0	0	1	1
21	Romania (ROU)	0	0	1	1
21	Slovenia (SLO)	0	0	1	1
21	South Korea (KOR)	0	0	1	1
21	United States (USA)	0	0	1	1
–	Individual Neutral Athletes (AIN)	0	0	1	1
Totals (28 entries)		14	14	28	56

== Prize money ==
The sums written are per medalist, bringing the total prizes awarded to €98,000. (retrieved from:)

Medal	Total	Judoka	Coach
Gold	€3,000	€2,400	€600
Silver	€2,000	€1,600	€400
Bronze	€1,000	€800	€200
