= Genki Koga =

Japanese judoka (born 1998)

Personal information
- Born: 19 December 1998 (age 27)
- Occupation: Judoka
- Height: 168 cm (5 ft 6 in)

Sport
- Country: Japan
- Sport: Judo
- Weight class: ‍–‍60 kg

Achievements and titles
- World Champ.: R32 (2021)
- Asian Champ.: (gold) (2019)
Medal record
Men's judo
Representing Japan
Asian Championships
| Gold medal – first place | 2019 Fujairah | ‍–‍60 kg |
IJF Grand Slam
| Bronze medal – third place | 2022 Tbilisi | ‍–‍60 kg |
| Bronze medal – third place | 2022 Tokyo | ‍–‍60 kg |
IJF Grand Prix
| Silver medal – second place | 2019 Tashkent | ‍–‍60 kg |
| Bronze medal – third place | 2022 Zagreb | ‍–‍60 kg |
World Juniors Championships
| Gold medal – first place | 2018 Nassau | ‍–‍60 kg |
| Bronze medal – third place | 2017 Zagreb | ‍–‍60 kg |
Asian Junior Championships
| Gold medal – first place | 2015 Bangkok | ‍–‍60 kg |
World Cadets Championships
| Gold medal – first place | 2015 Sarajevo | ‍–‍60 kg |

Profile at external databases
- IJF: 24832
- JudoInside.com: 97013
- Updated on 4 December 2022

Genki Koga (born 19 December 1998) is a Japanese judoka.

Koga is the gold medalist of the 2019 Asian-Pacific Judo Championships in the ‍–‍60 kg category.
