= Harsh Singh (judoka) =

Indian judoka

Personal information
- Born: 24 May 2003 (age 23)
- Occupation: Judoka

Sport
- Country: India
- Sport: Judo
- Weight class: ‍–‍60 kg

Achievements and titles
- World Champ.: R16 (2026)
- Asian Champ.: R16 (2026)
- Commonwealth Games: (gold) (2026)
Medal record
Men's judo
Representing India
Commonwealth Games
Gold medal – first place	2026 Glasgow	‍–‍60 kg

Profile at external databases
- IJF: 94965
- JudoInside.com: 175874
- Updated on 4 October 2026

Harsh Singh (born 24 May 2003) is an Indian judoka who competes in the men's 60 kg category. He won the gold medal in the men's 60 kg event at the 2026 Commonwealth Games, becoming the first Indian male judoka to win a Commonwealth Games gold medal.

== Life and career ==
Harsh Singh was born on 24 May 2003, did his schooling from Vinci Public School,Delhi from where his passion for Judo was discovered and nurtured by Mr. Satyawan during his time at VPS. He trains in judo at the Inspire Institute of Sport in Ballari district under coach Jiwan Sharma. He competes in the men's 60 kg category on the International Judo Federation World Tour. He has represented India in several international competitions since 2025.

Following his performances on the international circuit, Singh was selected in India's judo squad for the 2026 Commonwealth Games in Glasgow. At the 2026 Commonwealth Games, he competed in the men's 60 kg event. He won the round of 16 and the quarter-final bouts by an ippon. He defeated Pedro Neto of Australia in the semi-finals by a waza-ari. He defeated Australia's Joshua Katz in the final by scoring a waza-ari in the closing stage of the bout to win the gold medal. The victory made Singh the first Indian male judoka to win a Commonwealth Games gold medal.
