= Hikaru Tomokiyo =

Japanese judoka (born 1998)

Personal information
- Born: 25 November 1998 (age 27)

Sport
- Country: Japan
- Sport: Judo
Medal record
Men's judo
Representing Japan
Summer Universiade
Gold medal – first place	2019 Naples	81 kg
Asian Judo Championships
Bronze medal – third place	2019 Fujairah	81 kg

Hikaru Tomokiyo (友清 光, Tomokiyo Hikaru; born 25 November 1998) is a Japanese judoka. He won the gold medal in the men's welterweight (–81 kg) event at the 2019 Summer Universiade held in Naples, Italy.

== Professional career ==
In 2019, he won one of the bronze medals in the men's –81 kg event at the Asian-Pacific Judo Championships held in Fujairah, United Arab Emirates.
