= Judo at the 2026 Commonwealth Games – Men's 60 kg =

Judo competition

Judo – Men's 60 kg at the 2026 Commonwealth Games
- Venue: SEC Centre, Glasgow
- Date: July 31 2026
- Competitors: 14 from 13 nations

Medalists
gold medal	Harsh Singh	India
silver medal	Joshua Katz	Australia
bronze medal	Charlie Ayre	England
bronze medal	Pedro Antun Neto	Australia

The Men's 60 kg judo competitions at the 2026 Commonwealth Games in Glasgow, Scotland will place on July 31 at the SEC Centre. Fourteen judoka representing thirteen nations will take part.

== Seedings ==
The following judoka were seeded in advance of the draw:

Men's 60 kg
Seed	Judoka	Nation
1	Pedro Antun Neto	Australia
2	Charlie Ayre	England
3	Tumiso Phuthego	Botswana
4	Harsh Singh	India
5	James Zahra (R16)	Malta
6	Joshua Katz	Australia
7	Winsley Gangaya	Mauritius
8	Regan Wali	Kenya

== Results ==
=== Gold medal path ===
Round of 16
Regan Wali (KEN)	003 (yellow card)
Wimukthi Wickrama (SRI)	002
Harsh Singh (IND)	100 (yellow card)
Chikondi Kathewera (MAW)	000 (yellow card)
James Zahra (MLT)	001
Alan Monthouel (VAN)	100
Winsley Gangaya (MRI)	100
Tebania Mwemwenikeaki (KIR)	000
Tumiso Phuthego (BOT)	100 (yellow card)
Ibrahim Khamis (TAN)	000
Joshua Katz (AUS)	101
Alban Bouvet (RWA)	000

Quarterfinals
Pedro Antun Neto (AUS)	001
Regan Wali (KEN)	000 (yellow card)
Harsh Singh (IND)	102
Alan Monthouel (VAN)	000
Charlie Ayre (ENG)	101
Winsley Gangaya (MRI)	000
Tumiso Phuthego (BOT)	000
Joshua Katz (AUS)	100

Semifinal
Pedro Antun Neto (AUS)	000
Harsh Singh (IND)	010 (yellow card)
Charlie Ayre (ENG)	000 (yellow card)
Joshua Katz (AUS)	001 (yellow card)

Gold medal final
Harsh Singh (IND)	010
Joshua Katz (AUS)	000

=== Repechage/bronze medal path ===
Competitors who were eliminated between the quarter finals and the final enter the repechage for a bronze medal.

Repechage
Regan Wali (KEN)	100
Alan Monthouel (VAN)	000
Winsley Gangaya (MRI)	000 (yellow card)
Tumiso Phuthego (BOT)	010

Bronze medal
Regan Wali (KEN)	000
Charlie Ayre (ENG)	112
Tumiso Phuthego (BOT)	000 (yellow card)
Pedro Antun Neto (AUS)	100 (yellow card)
