= Judo at the 2026 Asian Games – Men's 66 kg =

Judo competition

Judo Men's 66 kg at the 2026 Asian Games
- Venue: Aichi International Arena
- Location: Nagoya, Japan
- Competitors: 20 from 20 nations

Medalists
gold medal	Kazirbekiin Yolk	Mongolia
silver medal	Abdurakhim Nutfulloev	Uzbekistan
bronze medal	Sukhrob Boqiev	Bahrain
bronze medal	Xue Ziyang	China

The men's 66 kilograms (half-lightweight) competition in Judo at the 2026 Asian Games was held on 30 September 2026 at the Aichi International Arena in Nagoya, Japan. The event was competed by 20 competitors from 20 nations. Kazirbekiin Yolk of Mongolia won the gold medal after defeating Abdurakhim Nutfulloev of Uzbekistan in the final. Sukhrob Boqiev of Bahrain and Xue Ziyang of China won the bronze medals.

== Background ==
Judo was first introduced in the Asian Games at the 1986 edition.

Japan's Ryoma Tanaka was the defending champion, having won the gold medal in the same event at the 2022 Asian Games in Hangzhou. Mongolia's Yondonperenlein Baskhüü won the silver medal, while South Korea's An Ba-ul and the United Arab Emirates' Bayanmönkhiin Narmandakh won the bronze medals. Of the medal winners at the previous Asian Games, none of them returned to compete at the 2026 Asian Games.

Kazakhstan's Gusman Kyrgyzbayev was a bronze medalist at the 2024 Summer Olympics in Paris in the men's 66 kg category. He had also won the silver medal at the 2021 World Judo Championships and finished seventh in the previous Asian Games. Tajikistan's Nurali Emomali won the silver medal at the 2025 World Judo Championships and had also won the bronze medal at the 2025 Asian Judo Championships. He won the gold medal at the 2026 Asian Judo Championships in April 2026. Mongolia's Kazirbekiin Yolk was a bronze medalist at the 2025 World Judo Championships in the men's 60 kg category and was placed seventh in the 66 kg category at the 2026 Asian Judo Championships.

Other competitors included China's Xue Ziyang and Kim Chann-yeong, who won bronze medals at the 2026 Asian Judo Championships, and , whoUzbekistan's Abdurakhim Nutfulloev had won the gold medal at the 2025 Ulaanbaatar Grand Slam.

== Schedule ==
The men's judo 66 kg event was held on 30 September 2026 held at the Aichi International Arena in Nagoya.

All times are Japan Standard Time (UTC+09:00)

Date	Time	Event
Wednesday, 30 September 2026	11:00	Elimination round of 32
Wednesday, 30 September 2026	11:00	Elimination round of 16
Wednesday, 30 September 2026	11:00	Quarterfinals
Wednesday, 30 September 2026	11:00	Repechage
Wednesday, 30 September 2026	11:00	Semifinals
Wednesday, 30 September 2026	17:00	Finals

== Format ==
The individual judo competition was competed as a single-elimination tournament. The competitors were divided into two halves with the winner of each match advancing to the next match. The winners of the semifinals of the two halves competed against each other for the gold and silver medals. Each judoka who loses to one of the two finalists moves into the repechage rounds, which is used to determine the bronze medals. The losers of the semifinals compete against the remaining repechage opponent from their half of the bracket in the bronze medal bout. The outcome of each match is determined by the score with points given to various techniques such as ippon, waza-ari, and yuko, and penalties.

== Summary ==
The event was competed by 20 competitors from 20 nations.

Kazirbyek defeated Afghanistan's Hikmatullah Rahmani in the round of 16 after the contest ended in a hansoku-make after Rahmani received three shido penalties. In the quarterfinals, Kazirbyek beat Emomali, after scoring a waza-ari to advance to the semifinals. In the semifinals, he defeated Kyrgyzbayev after scoring a waza-ari and qualify for the final.

The other finalist was Nutfulloev, who defeated Philippines' Keisei Nakano in the round of 16 by submission. In the quarterfinals, he defeated Xue by waza-ari before overcoming Kim in the semifinals by a yuko. In the finals, Kazirbyek defeated Nutfulloev by a ippon to win the gold medal. While Kazirbyek scored a yuko early in the match, both the judokas later received a shido penalty for non-combativeness. Then, Kazirbyek executed a hold-down to force Nutfulloev into submission.

Sukhrob Boqiev of Bahrain and Xue won the two bronze medals. Boqiev defeated Kim by waza-ari while Xue defeated Kyrgyzbayev in the other bronze-medal contest by scoring a yuko.

== Results ==
=== Main bracket ===
==== Final ====
Final
Kazirbekiin Yolk (MGL)	101 (yellow card)
Abdurakhim Nutfulloev (UZB)	000 (yellow card)

==== Top half ====
Round of 32
Somnang Chantha (CAM)	000
Hikmatullah Rahmani (AFG)	100
Sukhrob Boqiev (BRN)	100
Khaledul Hasan Milu (BAN)	000 (yellow card)

Round of 16
Nurali Emomali (TJK)	100
Kubanychbek Aibek Uulu (KGZ)	000
Kazirbekiin Yolk (MGL)	111
Hikmatullah Rahmani (AFG)	000
Gusman Kyrgyzbayev (KAZ)	100
Daham Vipulaweera (SRI)	000
Shinsei Hattori (JPN)	000
Sukhrob Boqiev (BRN)	100

Quarter-finals
Nurali Emomali (TJK)	000
Kazirbekiin Yolk (MGL)	010
Gusman Kyrgyzbayev (KAZ)	001
Sukhrob Boqiev (BRN)	000 (yellow card)

Semi-finals
Kazirbekiin Yolk (MGL)	010 (yellow card)
Gusman Kyrgyzbayev (KAZ)	000 (yellow card)

==== Bottom half ====
Round of 32
Vishesh B.K. (NEP)	001 (yellow card)
Wong Ka Ki (HKG)	011 (yellow card)
Hesham Makabr (YEM)	000
Muhammad Fathur Rahman (INA)	110 (yellow card)

Round of 16
Kim Chann-yeong (KOR)	100
Abolfazl Mahmoudi (IRI)	000
Lin Chong-you (TPE)	101
Wong Ka Ki (HKG)	000
Abdurakhim Nutfulloev (UZB)	100 (yellow card)
Keisei Nakano (PHI)	000
Xue Ziyang (CHN)	100 (yellow card)
Muhammad Fathur Rahman (INA)	000

Quarter-finals
Kim Chann-yeong (KOR)	010
Lin Chong-you (TPE)	000
Abdurakhim Nutfulloev (UZB)	011 (yellow card)
Xue Ziyang (CHN)	000

Semi-finals
Kim Chann-yeong (KOR)	000 (yellow card)
Abdurakhim Nutfulloev (UZB)	001 (yellow card)

=== Repechage ===
Repechage
Nurali Emomali (TJK)	000
Sukhrob Boqiev (BRN)	100 (yellow card)
Lin Chong-you (TPE)	001
Xue Ziyang (CHN)	002

Bronze medal
Sukhrob Boqiev (BRN)	010 (yellow card)
Kim Chann-yeong (KOR)	000 (yellow card)
Xue Ziyang (CHN)	001 (yellow card)
Gusman Kyrgyzbayev (KAZ)	000 (yellow card)
