= 2018 World Judo Juniors Championships =

Judo competition

Judo 2018 World Judo Juniors Championships
- Venue: Imperial Ballroom
- Location: Paradise Island, The Bahamas
- Dates: 17–21 October 2018
- Competitors: 425 from 66 nations

Champions
- Mixed team: Japan (2nd title)

Competition at external databases
- Links: IJF • JudoInside

The 2018 World Judo Juniors Championships was held between 17 and 21 September 2018 at the Imperial Ballroom in Paradise Island, The Bahamas. The final day of competition featured a mixed team event, won by team Japan.

== Medalists ==
=== Men ===
Event	Gold	Silver	Bronze
−55 kg	Rovshan Aliyev (AZE)	Balabay Aghayev (AZE)	Imam Ibragimov (RUS)
−55 kg	Rovshan Aliyev (AZE)	Balabay Aghayev (AZE)	Handa Hayate (JPN)
−60 kg	Genki Koga (JPN)	Konishi Seishiro (JPN)	Renan Torres (BRA)
−60 kg	Genki Koga (JPN)	Konishi Seishiro (JPN)	Jaba Papinashvili (GEO)
−66 kg	Manuel Lombardo (ITA)	Michael Marcelino (BRA)	Murad Chopanov (RUS)
−66 kg	Manuel Lombardo (ITA)	Michael Marcelino (BRA)	Yuji Aida (JPN)
−73 kg	Bilal Çiloğlu (TUR)	Tsukamoto Ryo (JPN)	Georgios Markarian (GRE)
−73 kg	Bilal Çiloğlu (TUR)	Tsukamoto Ryo (JPN)	Zhanbolat Bagtbergenov (KAZ)
−81 kg	Christian Parlati (ITA)	Kasahara Hiromasa (JPN)	Luka Maisuradze (GEO)
−81 kg	Christian Parlati (ITA)	Kasahara Hiromasa (JPN)	Alexandre Arencibia (CAN)
−90 kg	Lasha Bekauri (GEO)	Sanshiro Murao (JPN)	Kosuke Mashiyama (JPN)
−90 kg	Lasha Bekauri (GEO)	Sanshiro Murao (JPN)	Mert Şişmanlar (TUR)
−100 kg	Sekine Kiyotaka (JPN)	Simeon Catharina (NED)	Onise Saneblidze (GEO)
−100 kg	Sekine Kiyotaka (JPN)	Simeon Catharina (NED)	Iwo Baraniewski (POL)
+100 kg	Gela Zaalishvili (GEO)	Stephan Hegyi (AUT)	Erik Abramov (GER)
+100 kg	Gela Zaalishvili (GEO)	Stephan Hegyi (AUT)	Dzhamal Gamzatkhanov (RUS)

=== Women ===
Event	Gold	Silver	Bronze
−44 kg	Todokoro Chihiro (JPN)	Oumaima Bedioui (TUN)	Amanda Arraes (BRA)
−44 kg	Todokoro Chihiro (JPN)	Oumaima Bedioui (TUN)	Loïs Petit (BEL)
−48 kg	Daria Bilodid (UKR)	Yoshida Sana (JPN)	Andrea Stojadinov (SRB)
−48 kg	Daria Bilodid (UKR)	Yoshida Sana (JPN)	Laura Martinez (ESP)
−52 kg	Ryūko Takeda (JPN)	Gefen Primo (ISR)	Cleonia Rîciu (ROU)
−52 kg	Ryūko Takeda (JPN)	Gefen Primo (ISR)	Aleksandra Kaleta (POL)
−57 kg	Haruka Funakubo (JPN)	Sarah-Léonie Cysique (FRA)	Kaja Kajzer (SLO)
−57 kg	Haruka Funakubo (JPN)	Sarah-Léonie Cysique (FRA)	Kana Tomizawa (JPN)
−63 kg	Sanne Vermeer (NED)	Lærke Olsen (DEN)	Ura Asumi (JPN)
−63 kg	Sanne Vermeer (NED)	Lærke Olsen (DEN)	Anja Obradović (SRB)
−70 kg	Alice Bellandi (ITA)	Shimmori Ryo (JPN)	Margit de Voogd (NED)
−70 kg	Alice Bellandi (ITA)	Shimmori Ryo (JPN)	Candice Lebreton (FRA)
−78 kg	Wada Rinoko (JPN)	Karla Prodan (CRO)	Patrícia Sampaio (POR)
−78 kg	Wada Rinoko (JPN)	Karla Prodan (CRO)	Shelley Ludford (GBR)
+78 kg	Hikaru Kodama (JPN)	Beatriz Souza (BRA)	Laura Fuseau (FRA)
+78 kg	Hikaru Kodama (JPN)	Beatriz Souza (BRA)	Renee Lucht (GER)

=== Mixed ===
Event	Gold	Silver	Bronze
Mixed team	Japan	Brazil	Russia
Mixed team	Japan	Brazil	Kazakhstan

Source Results

== Medal table ==
* Host nation (Bahamas)

Rank	Nation	Gold	Silver	Bronze	Total
1	Japan (JPN)	8	6	5	19
2	Italy (ITA)	3	0	0	3
3	Georgia (GEO)	2	0	3	5
4	Netherlands (NED)	1	1	1	3
5	Azerbaijan (AZE)	1	1	0	2
6	Turkey (TUR)	1	0	1	2
7	Ukraine (UKR)	1	0	0	1
8	Brazil (BRA)	0	3	2	5
9	France (FRA)	0	1	2	3
10	Austria (AUT)	0	1	0	1
10	Croatia (CRO)	0	1	0	1
10	Denmark (DEN)	0	1	0	1
10	Israel (ISR)	0	1	0	1
10	Tunisia (TUN)	0	1	0	1
15	Russia (RUS)	0	0	4	4
16	Germany (GER)	0	0	2	2
16	Kazakhstan (KAZ)	0	0	2	2
16	Poland (POL)	0	0	2	2
16	Serbia (SRB)	0	0	2	2
20	Belgium (BEL)	0	0	1	1
20	Canada (CAN)	0	0	1	1
20	Great Britain (GBR)	0	0	1	1
20	Greece (GRE)	0	0	1	1
20	Portugal (POR)	0	0	1	1
20	Romania (ROU)	0	0	1	1
20	Slovenia (SLO)	0	0	1	1
20	Spain (ESP)	0	0	1	1
Totals (27 entries)		17	17	34	68
