= Dilshot Khalmatov =

Ukrainian judoka and sambist (born 1998)

Personal information
- Born: 7 March 1998 (age 28) Kyiv, Ukraine
- Occupation: Judoka

Sport
- Country: Ukraine
- Sport: Judo
- Weight class: ‍–‍60 kg

Achievements and titles
- Olympic Games: R16 (2024)
- World Champ.: R32 (2022, 2026)
- European Champ.: (silver) (2023)
Medal record
Men's judo
Representing Ukraine
European Championships
Silver medal – second place	2023 Montpellier	‍–‍60 kg
IJF Grand Slam
Silver medal – second place	2022 Baku	‍–‍60 kg
Silver medal – second place	2023 Antalya	‍–‍60 kg
Silver medal – second place	2026 Paris	‍–‍60 kg
IJF Grand Prix
Gold medal – first place	2023 Zagreb	‍–‍60 kg
Silver medal – second place	2023 Linz	‍–‍60 kg
Silver medal – second place	2026 Linz	‍–‍60 kg
Bronze medal – third place	2024 Linz	‍–‍60 kg
European Junior Championships
Gold medal – first place	2018 Sofia	‍–‍55 kg

Profile at external databases
- IJF: 18231
- JudoInside.com: 95228
- Updated on 4 October 2026

Dilshot Khalmatov (Ukrainian: Халматов Дільшот Шухратович; born 7 March 1998) is a Ukrainian judoka and sambist. He represented Ukraine at the 2024 Summer Olympics.

== Career ==
Khalmatov started his senior international career in 2021 when he competed at the 2021 World Judo Championships where he lost to Mongolian Lkhagvajamtsyn Önöbold in the first bout. At the 2022 European Judo Championships, Khalmatov defeated Italian Angelo Pantano but lost to Lukhumi Chkhvimiani from Georgia in the round of 16. The 2022 World Judo Championships were not successful for him, since he lost to Mohammad Rashnonezhad from the Refugee Team in the round of 32. At the 2023 European Judo Championships, Khalmatov won silver after he lost to Luka Mkheidze from France in the final. He is silver medallist of the 2022 Judo Grand Slam Baku, silver medallist of the 2023 Judo Grand Prix Linz, winner of the 2023 Judo Grand Prix Zagreb and bronze medallist of the 2024 Judo Grand Prix Linz.

Khalmatov qualified though ratings for the 2024 Summer Olympics. In Paris, he defeated Doston Ruziev from Uzbekistan but lost to the eventual Olympic champion Yeldos Smetov from Kazakhstan.

== Personal life ==
Khalmatov studied at the Hlukhiv National Pedagogical University of Oleksandr Dovzhenko.
