= Cédric Revol =

French judoka (born 1994)

Personal information
- Born: 22 July 1994 (age 31)
- Occupation: Judoka

Sport
- Country: France
- Sport: Judo
- Weight class: ‍–‍60 kg

Achievements and titles
- World Champ.: R64 (2017, 2023)
- European Champ.: (bronze) (2022, 2024)
Medal record
Men's judo
Representing France
European Championships
Bronze medal – third place	2022 Sofia	‍–‍60 kg
Bronze medal – third place	2024 Zagreb	‍–‍60 kg
IJF Grand Slam
Gold medal – first place	2023 Abu Dhabi	‍–‍60 kg
Silver medal – second place	2023 Paris	‍–‍60 kg
Silver medal – second place	2023 Astana	‍–‍60 kg
Silver medal – second place	2024 Abu Dhabi	‍–‍60 kg
Bronze medal – third place	2016 Abu Dhabi	‍–‍60 kg
Bronze medal – third place	2017 Ekaterinburg	‍–‍60 kg
Bronze medal – third place	2018 Paris	‍–‍60 kg
Bronze medal – third place	2021 Abu Dhabi	‍–‍60 kg
IJF Grand Prix
Gold medal – first place	2022 Perth	‍–‍60 kg
Silver medal – second place	2024 Linz	‍–‍60 kg
Bronze medal – third place	2016 Budapest	‍–‍60 kg
Bronze medal – third place	2016 Zagreb	‍–‍60 kg
Bronze medal – third place	2019 Tel Aviv	‍–‍60 kg
Bronze medal – third place	2023 Almada	‍–‍60 kg

Profile at external databases
- IJF: 9376
- JudoInside.com: 67282
- Updated on 13 October 2024

Cédric Revol (born 22 July 1994) is a French judoka.

Revol is a bronze medalist of the 2018 Judo Grand Slam Paris in the ‍–‍60 kg category.

At the 2021 Judo Grand Slam Abu Dhabi held in Abu Dhabi, United Arab Emirates, Revol won one of the bronze medals in his event.

Revol would go on to take GOLD at the 2023 Abu Dhabi Grand Slam
