= Izhak Ashpiz =

Israeli judoka (born 2007)

Personal information
- Native name: יצחק אשפיז
- Born: 12 November 2007 (age 19)
- Occupation: Judoka

Sport
- Country: Israel
- Sport: Judo
- Weight class: ‍–‍60 kg
- Rank: Black belt

Achievements and titles
- World Champ.: R32 (2026)
- European Champ.: (bronze) (2026)
- Highest world ranking: 2^{nd}
Medal record
Men's judo
Representing Israel
European Championships
Bronze medal – third place	2026 Tbilisi	‍–‍60 kg
IJF Grand Slam
Gold medal – first place	2026 Tbilisi	‍–‍60 kg
Gold medal – first place	2026 Budapest	‍–‍60 kg
Bronze medal – third place	2026 Paris	‍–‍60 kg
Bronze medal – third place	2026 Ulaanbaatar	‍–‍60 kg
IJF Grand Prix
Gold medal – first place	2025 Lima	‍–‍60 kg
World Cadets Championships
Gold medal – first place	2023 Zagreb	‍–‍60 kg
European Cadet Championships
Gold medal – first place	2024 Sofia	‍–‍60 kg
Bronze medal – third place	2023 Odivelas	‍–‍60 kg

Profile at external databases
- IJF: 67289
- JudoInside.com: 153669
- Updated on 4 October 2026

Izhak Ashpiz (Hebrew: יצחק אשפיז; born 12 November 2007) is an Israeli judoka.

Ashpiz won a bronze medal at the 2026 Paris Grand Slam.
