= Arnold Kisoka =

Congolese judoka (born 2000)

Personal information
- Born: 4 September 2000 (age 26) Kinshasa, Democratic Republic of the Congo
- Occupation: Judoka

Sport
- Country: Democratic Republic of the Congo
- Sport: Judo
- Weight class: ‍–‍60 kg

Achievements and titles
- Olympic Games: R32 (2024)
- World Champ.: R64 (2024)
- African Champ.: 5th (2024)
Medal record
Men's judo
Representing Democratic Republic of the Congo
Jeux de la Francophonie
| Bronze medal – third place | 2023 Kinshasa | ‍–‍60 kg |

Profile at external databases
- IJF: 71771
- JudoInside.com: 157840
- Updated on 19 February 2025

Arnold Daso Kisoka (born 4 September 2000) is a Congolese judoka. He qualified for the 2024 Summer Olympics and was selected as his country's flag bearer.

== Biography ==
Kisoka was born in Kinshasa, the capital of the Democratic Republic of the Congo, as the 10th of 11 children. He participated in judo at an early age and rose through the ranks; he also attended Bumbe Technical Industrial Vocational Institute and graduated in 2018 with a degree in construction. A member of the Ouragan judo club in Matete, he was selected for the national team in 2022 and made his international debut at the Dakar African Open tournament in November 2022. Later that month, he won gold at the Yaoundé African Open, thus becoming the first Congolese judoka to accomplish the feat.

In 2023, Kisoka won a silver and a bronze medal at African Open competitions; he also placed seventh in his weight class at the African Judo Championships and won a bronze medal at the 2023 Jeux de la Francophonie, held in Kinshasa. He won a bronze medal at the African Open in April 2024 and later that month placed fifth at the African Championships.

Kisoka qualified for the 2024 Summer Olympics in the 60 kg weight class. He was selected the Congolese flag bearer and also participated in the 2024 Summer Olympics torch relay, becoming the first ever Congolese to do so.
