= Sherzod Davlatov =

Kazakhstani judoka (born 2001)

Personal information
- Born: 17 November 2001 (age 24)
- Occupation: Judoka

Sport
- Country: Kazakhstan
- Sport: Judo
- Weight class: ‍–‍60 kg

Achievements and titles
- World Champ.: (silver) (2026)
- Asian Champ.: (bronze) (2025)
Medal record
Men's judo
Representing Kazakhstan
World Championships
Silver medal – second place	2026 Baku	‍–‍60 kg
Asian Championships
Bronze medal – third place	2025 Bangkok	‍–‍60 kg
IJF Grand Slam
Bronze medal – third place	2026 Astana	‍–‍60 kg
IJF Grand Prix
Gold medal – first place	2024 Zagreb	‍–‍60 kg
Bronze medal – third place	2026 Linz	‍–‍60 kg
World Juniors Championships
Bronze medal – third place	2021 Olbia	‍–‍60 kg
Asian Cadet Championships
Gold medal – first place	2017 Bishkek	‍–‍50 kg
Gold medal – first place	2018 Beirut	‍–‍55 kg
Islamic Solidarity Games
Silver medal – second place	2025 Riyadh	‍–‍60 kg

Profile at external databases
- IJF: 37534
- JudoInside.com: 109555
- Updated on 5 October 2026

Sherzod Davlatov (Kazakh: Шерзод Давлатов; born 17 November 2001) is a Kazakhstani judoka. He won a silver medal at the 2026 World Judo Championships.

== Career ==
In September 2024, Davlatov competed at the 2024 Judo Grand Prix Zagreb and won his first career Grand Prix gold medal in the –‍60 kg category.

In April 2025, he competed at the 2025 Asian Judo Championships and won a bronze medal in the –‍60 kg category. In November 2025, he competed at the 2025 Islamic Solidarity Games and won a silver medal in the –‍60 kg category.

In May 2026, he competed at the 2026 Judo Grand Slam Astana and won a bronze medal in the –‍60 kg category, his first career Judo Grand Slam medal. In October 2026, he competed at the 2026 World Judo Championships and won a silver medal in the –‍60 kg category. In the quarterfinals, he defeated France's Romain Valadier-Picard, the 2025 World Judo Championships silver medalist. In the semifinals, he defeated Japan's Ryuju Nagayama, the 2025 world champion and bronze medalist at the 2024 Summer Olympics.
