= Simon Zulu =

Zambian judoka (born 2001)

Personal information
- Born: 31 August 2001 (age 25)
- Occupation: Judoka

Sport
- Country: Zambia
- Sport: Judo
- Weight class: ‍–‍60 kg

Achievements and titles
- Olympic Games: R32 (2024)
- World Champ.: R16 (2022)
- African Champ.: (bronze) (2023, 2024)
Medal record
Men's judo
Representing Zambia
African Games
Bronze medal – third place	2024 Accra	‍–‍60 kg
African Championships
Bronze medal – third place	2023 Casablanca	‍–‍60 kg
Bronze medal – third place	2024 Cairo	‍–‍60 kg

Profile at external databases
- IJF: 38805
- JudoInside.com: 115892
- Updated on 4 December 2025

Simon Zulu (born 31 August 2004) is a Zambian judoka. Zulu won gold in the 60 kg category at the 2018 African Cadet Championships in Bujumbura. Zulu also participated in the 2018 Summer Youth Olympics in Buenos Aires. He won a bronze medal at the 2023 African Championships in Casablanca, and won gold at the Dakar African Open in Senegal. He represented Zambia at the 2024 Summer Olympics, where he was eliminated in the first round of the men's 60 kg judo tournament after being disqualified during his match against Kim Won-jin for a head dive.
