= Dilshodbek Baratov =

Uzbekistani judoka (born 1997)

Personal information
- Nationality: Uzbekistan
- Born: 14 June 1997 (age 29) Uzbekistan
- Occupation: Judoka
- Height: 165 cm (5 ft 5 in)

Sport
- Country: Uzbekistan
- Sport: Judo
- Weight class: ‍–‍60 kg

Achievements and titles
- World Champ.: (silver) (2023)
- Asian Champ.: R16 (2023)
Medal record
Men's judo
Representing Uzbekistan
World Championships
| Silver medal – second place | 2023 Doha | ‍–‍60 kg |
IJF Grand Slam
| Bronze medal – third place | 2022 Antalya | ‍–‍60 kg |
IJF Grand Prix
| Gold medal – first place | 2024 Odivelas | ‍–‍60 kg |

Profile at external databases
- IJF: 48187
- JudoInside.com: 106667
- Updated on 27 January 2024

Dilshodbek Baratov (born 14 June 1997) is an Uzbekistani judoka. He won the silver medal in the men's 60 kg event at the 2023 World Judo Championships held in Doha, Qatar.

In 2022, he lost his bronze medal match in the men's 60 kg event at the World Judo Championships held in Tashkent, Uzbekistan.
