= Balabay Aghayev =

Azerbaijani judoka (1998)

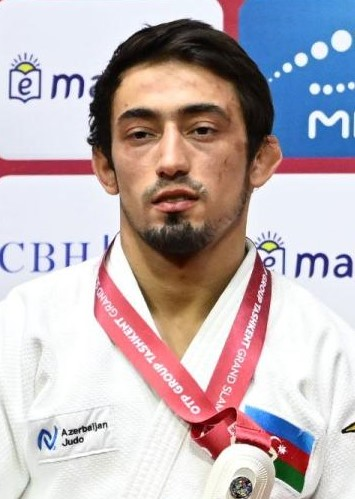
- Aghayev in 2026

Personal information
- Native name: Balabəy Ağayev
- Born: 30 September 1998 (age 28) Baku, Azerbaijan
- Occupation: Judoka

Sport
- Country: Azerbaijan
- Sport: Judo
- Weight class: ‍–‍60 kg

Achievements and titles
- Olympic Games: R16 (2024)
- World Champ.: R16 (2023, 2026)
- European Champ.: (silver) (2024)
Medal record
Men's judo
Representing Azerbaijan
European Championships
Silver medal – second place	2024 Zagreb	‍–‍60 kg
World Masters
Bronze medal – third place	2022 Jerusalem	‍–‍60 kg
IJF Grand Slam
Gold medal – first place	2021 Paris	‍–‍60 kg
Gold medal – first place	2022 Baku	‍–‍60 kg
Gold medal – first place	2023 Paris	‍–‍60 kg
Gold medal – first place	2025 Dushanbe	‍–‍60 kg
Gold medal – first place	2026 Paris	‍–‍60 kg
Gold medal – first place	2026 Ulaanbaatar	‍–‍60 kg
Gold medal – first place	2026 Abu Dhabi	‍–‍60 kg
Silver medal – second place	2026 Tashkent	‍–‍60 kg
Bronze medal – third place	2022 Abu Dhabi	‍–‍60 kg
Bronze medal – third place	2024 Baku	‍–‍60 kg
Bronze medal – third place	2024 Tbilisi	‍–‍60 kg
IJF Grand Prix
Gold medal – first place	2025 Guadalajara	‍–‍60 kg
Silver medal – second place	2022 Almada	‍–‍60 kg
World Juniors Championships
Silver medal – second place	2018 Nassau	‍–‍55 kg
European Junior Championships
Bronze medal – third place	2018 Sofia	‍–‍55 kg
Islamic Solidarity Games
Gold medal – first place	2021 Konya	‍–‍60 kg
Gold medal – first place	2021 Konya	Men's team

Profile at external databases
- IJF: 20144
- JudoInside.com: 96575
- Updated on 30 October 2026

Balabay Azer oglu Aghayev (Azerbaijani: Balabəy Azər oğlu Ağayev; born 30 September 1998) is an Azerbaijani judoka, silver medalist of the 2024 European Judo Championships, member of the Azerbaijan national judo team. He is also a silver medalist at the 2018 World Juniors Championships, a three-time Grand Slam gold medalist), the champion of the 2021 Islamic Solidarity Games and the 2021 Azerbaijan national champion. Aghayev represented Azerbaijan at the 2024 Summer Olympics.

== Biography ==
Balabay Aghayev was born on 30 September 1998 in Baku. He studied at the Azerbaijan State Academy of Physical Education and Sport.

In October 2018, he won a silver medal at the 2018 World Juniors Championship in Nassau. That same year, he won the European Cup for juniors under 21 in Lignano. In October 2021, he won the gold medal at the 2021 Paris Grand Slam. In December 2021, representing the Neftchi Sports Club, he won the Azerbaijan National Championship.

In January 2022, Aghayev won silver at the 2022 Almada Grand Prix. In April 2022, he placed fifth at the 2022 European Championships in Sofia, losing the bronze medal match to Jorre Verstraeten of Belgium. That summer, at the 2021 Islamic Solidarity Games in Konya, he won gold in the under 60 kg category and in the men's team event. In October 2022, he won bronze at the 2022 Abu Dhabi Grand Slam, and in November secured a gold medal at the 2022 Baku Grand Slam. In December, he earned a bronze medal at the 2022 World Masters.

In February 2023, Aghayev claimed another gold medal at the 2023 Paris Grand Slam. In November, at the 2023 European Championships in Montpellier, he lost his first match to Andrea Carlino of Italy. In 2024, he won bronze at the 2024 Baku Grand Slam and at the 2024 Tbilisi Grand Slam.

As of March 2024, he ranked 7th in the world rankings.

In April 2024, Aghayev won silver at the 2024 European Championships in Zagreb, losing in the final to reigning world champion Francisco Garrigós of Spain. At the 2024 Summer Olympics, Aghayev was eliminated in the round of 16, losing to Kim Won-jin of South Korea.

On 29 November 2024, he secured a bronze medal at the Azerbaijan Judo Championship.

His personal coach is Shumshad Bakhramov.

In June 2026, Balabay Agayev defeated Ryuju Nagayama in the final at the 2026 Ulaanbaatar Grand Slam tournament and won the gold medal.

In August 2026, at an international tournament in Kraków, he defeated all opponents and won the gold medal.

On 29 October 2026, at the 2026 Abu Dhabi Grand Slam, Balabay Agayev won the gold medal in the under 60 kg weight category.
