= Ayub Bliev =

Russian judoka (born 1997)

Personal information
- Born: 2 June 1997 (age 29)
- Occupation: Judoka

Sport
- Country: Russia
- Sport: Judo
- Weight class: ‍–‍60 kg

Achievements and titles
- World Champ.: (bronze) (2025)
- European Champ.: (silver) (2025)
- Highest world ranking: 1^{st}
Medal record
Men's judo
Representing the IJF
World Championships
Bronze medal – third place	2025 Budapest	‍–‍60 kg
European Championships
Silver medal – second place	2025 Podgorica	‍–‍60 kg
IJF Grand Slam
Gold medal – first place	2025 Tashkent	‍–‍60 kg
Bronze medal – third place	2024 Tokyo	‍–‍60 kg
Representing Individual Neutral Athletes
IJF Grand Slam
Gold medal – first place	2024 Antalya	‍–‍60 kg
Bronze medal – third place	2023 Abu Dhabi	‍–‍60 kg
Bronze medal – third place	2023 Tokyo	‍–‍60 kg
Representing Russia
IJF Grand Slam
Gold medal – first place	2025 Abu Dhabi	‍–‍60 kg
Gold medal – first place	2026 Dushanbe	‍–‍60 kg
IJF Grand Prix
Bronze medal – third place	2026 Qingdao	‍–‍60 kg
European U23 Championships
Silver medal – second place	2019 Izhevsk	‍–‍60 kg
European Junior Championships
Silver medal – second place	2015 Oberwart	‍–‍55 kg
European Cadet Championships
Silver medal – second place	2014 Athens	‍–‍55 kg

Profile at external databases
- IJF: 22413
- JudoInside.com: 44022
- Updated on 26 June 2026

Ayub Zuberovich Bliev (Russian: Аюб Зуберович Блиев; (Kabardian: Бли Аюб Зубер и къуэ); born 2 June 1997) is a Russian judoka of Circassian Kabardian ancestry, from Kabardino-Balkaria who competes in the super lightweight weight category (up to 60 kg). He is a bronze medalist of the 2025 World Championships, silver medalist of the 2025 European Championships, a medalist of the Russian Championships, and Master of Sports of Russia.

== Career ==
Bliev became interested in judo at the age of 11. At the 2014 European Cadet Judo Championships in Athens, Bliev won silver in the 55 kg class after losing to Azerbaijani Natig Gurbanli in the gold medal match. At the 2015 European Junior Championships in Oberwart, he won silver in the 55 kg class after a final loss to Dutchman Roy Koffijberg. At the 2019 European U23 Championships in Izhevsk, Bliev won silver in the 60 kg class after a final loss to compatriot Ramazan Abdulaev.

Bliev won the 2024 Grand Slam Antalya tournament and three medals at the 2023 and 2024 Grand Slam tournaments. He also finished 5th at the 2024 World Championships and was disqualified in the semi-final bout for a prohibited action.

In April 2025, Bliev won a silver medal at the European Championships in Podgorica as a neutral athlete. In the final bout, he lost to his opponent from Georgia, Giorgi Sardalashvili. In June 2025, he won a bronze medal at the World Championships in Budapest in the 60 kg weight category. In the bout for third place, he defeated his opponent from Hungary, Márton Andrási.
