= Lee Ha-rim =

South Korean judoka (born 1997)

Personal information
- Native name: 이하림
- Nationality: South Korea
- Born: 27 June 1997 (age 29) Yeongcheon, Gyeongsang, South Korea
- Occupation: Judoka
- Height: 166 cm (5 ft 5 in)

Sport
- Country: South Korea
- Sport: Judo
- Weight class: ‍–‍60 kg

Achievements and titles
- World Champ.: (bronze) (2023, 2024)
- Asian Champ.: (silver) (2023)
Medal record
Men's judo
Representing South Korea
World Championships
Bronze medal – third place	2023 Doha	‍–‍60 kg
Bronze medal – third place	2024 Abu Dhabi	‍–‍60 kg
Asian Games
Silver medal – second place	2023 Hangzhou	‍–‍60 kg
Bronze medal – third place	2018 Jakarta	‍–‍60 kg
Asian Championships
Bronze medal – third place	2021 Bishkek	‍–‍60 kg
World Masters
Gold medal – first place	2022 Jerusalem	‍–‍60 kg
IJF Grand Slam
Silver medal – second place	2024 Paris	‍–‍60 kg
Silver medal – second place	2026 Lausanne	‍–‍60 kg
Bronze medal – third place	2022 Ulaanbaatar	‍–‍60 kg
Bronze medal – third place	2022 Tokyo	‍–‍60 kg
Bronze medal – third place	2023 Paris	‍–‍60 kg
Bronze medal – third place	2023 Ulaanbaatar	‍–‍60 kg
Bronze medal – third place	2025 Tokyo	‍–‍60 kg
IJF Grand Prix
Gold medal – first place	2022 Almada	‍–‍60 kg
Silver medal – second place	2025 Qingdao	‍–‍60 kg
Bronze medal – third place	2019 Montreal	‍–‍60 kg
World Juniors Championships
Silver medal – second place	2015 Abu Dhabi	‍–‍55 kg

Profile at external databases
- IJF: 26667
- JudoInside.com: 99209
- Updated on 31 August 2026

Lee Ha-rim (born 27 June 1997) is a South Korean judoka. He won one of the bronze medals in the men's 60 kg event at the 2023 World Judo Championships held in Doha, Qatar.

Lee is a bronze medalist of the 2018 Asian Games in the ‍–‍60 kg category.
