= Yang Yung-wei =

Taiwanese judoka (born 1997)

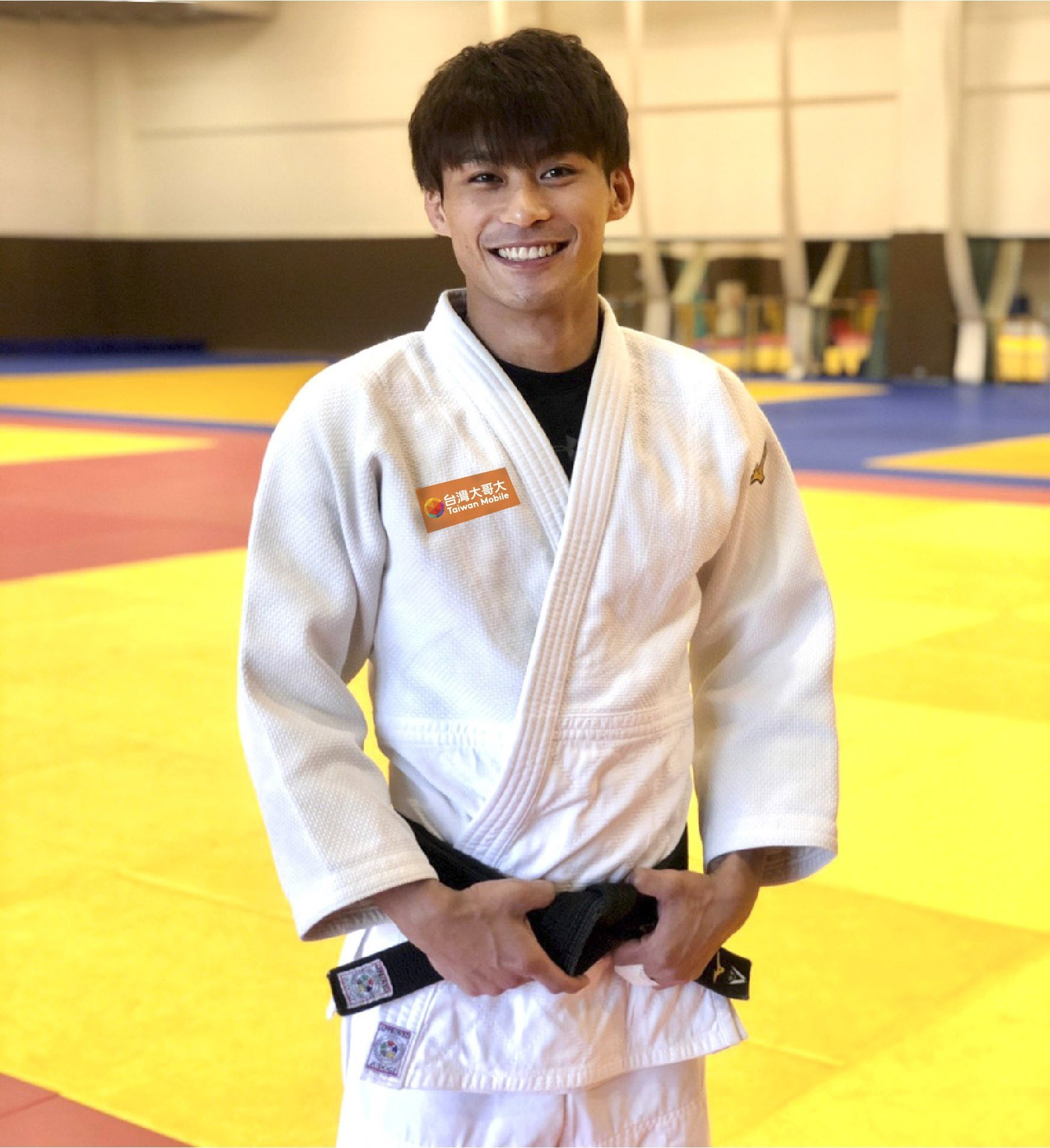
- Yang in 2021

Personal information
- Native name: Drangadrang
- Born: 28 September 1997 (age 29) Shizi, Pingtung, Taiwan
- Home town: Houli, Taichung, Taiwan
- Occupation: Judoka

Sport
- Country: Taiwan
- Sport: Judo
- Weight class: ‍–‍60 kg

Achievements and titles
- Olympic Games: (silver) (2020)
- World Champ.: (silver) (2024)
- Asian Champ.: (gold) (2023)
Medal record
Men's judo
Representing Chinese Taipei
Olympic Games
Silver medal – second place	2020 Tokyo	‍–‍60 kg
World Championships
Silver medal – second place	2024 Abu Dhabi	‍–‍60 kg
Bronze medal – third place	2022 Tashkent	‍–‍60 kg
Asian Games
Gold medal – first place	2023 Hangzhou	‍–‍60 kg
Bronze medal – third place	2018 Jakarta	‍–‍60 kg
Asian Championships
Silver medal – second place	2019 Fujairah	‍–‍60 kg
Silver medal – second place	2021 Bishkek	‍–‍60 kg
Silver medal – second place	2024 Hong Kong	‍–‍60 kg
Silver medal – second place	2025 Bangkok	‍–‍60 kg
Silver medal – second place	2026 Ordos	‍–‍60 kg
Bronze medal – third place	2022 Nur‑Sultan	‍–‍60 kg
World Masters
Silver medal – second place	2021 Doha	‍–‍60 kg
Bronze medal – third place	2022 Jerusalem	‍–‍60 kg
IJF Grand Slam
Gold medal – first place	2021 Abu Dhabi	‍–‍60 kg
Gold medal – first place	2022 Antalya	‍–‍60 kg
Silver medal – second place	2020 Düsseldorf	‍–‍60 kg
Silver medal – second place	2022 Ulaanbaatar	‍–‍60 kg
Silver medal – second place	2022 Abu Dhabi	‍–‍60 kg
Silver medal – second place	2024 Astana	‍–‍60 kg
Bronze medal – third place	2019 Osaka	‍–‍60 kg
Bronze medal – third place	2021 Antalya	‍–‍60 kg
Bronze medal – third place	2026 Astana	‍–‍60 kg
IJF Grand Prix
Gold medal – first place	2023 Perth (Note: Both 2023 Perth and 2025 Gold Coast were listed as Continental Open events by the International Judo Federation (IJF), but with same rules and ranking points as Grand Prix events.)	‍–‍60 kg
Gold medal – first place	2025 Gold Coast	‍–‍60 kg
Gold medal – first place	2026 Zagreb	‍–‍60 kg
Silver medal – second place	2019 Hohhot	‍–‍60 kg
Bronze medal – third place	2016 Qingdao	‍–‍60 kg
Bronze medal – third place	2018 Tashkent	‍–‍60 kg
Bronze medal – third place	2019 Budapest	‍–‍60 kg
Bronze medal – third place	2019 Tashkent	‍–‍60 kg
Bronze medal – third place	2024 Odivelas	‍–‍60 kg
Asian Junior Championships
Gold medal – first place	2017 Bishkek	‍–‍60 kg
Asian Cadet Championships
Silver medal – second place	2013 Hainan	‍–‍50 kg
Bronze medal – third place	2014 Hong Kong	‍–‍55 kg
Universiade
Silver medal – second place	2021 Chengdu	‍–‍60 kg

Profile at external databases
- IJF: 27304
- JudoInside.com: 2354
- Updated on 18 November 2026

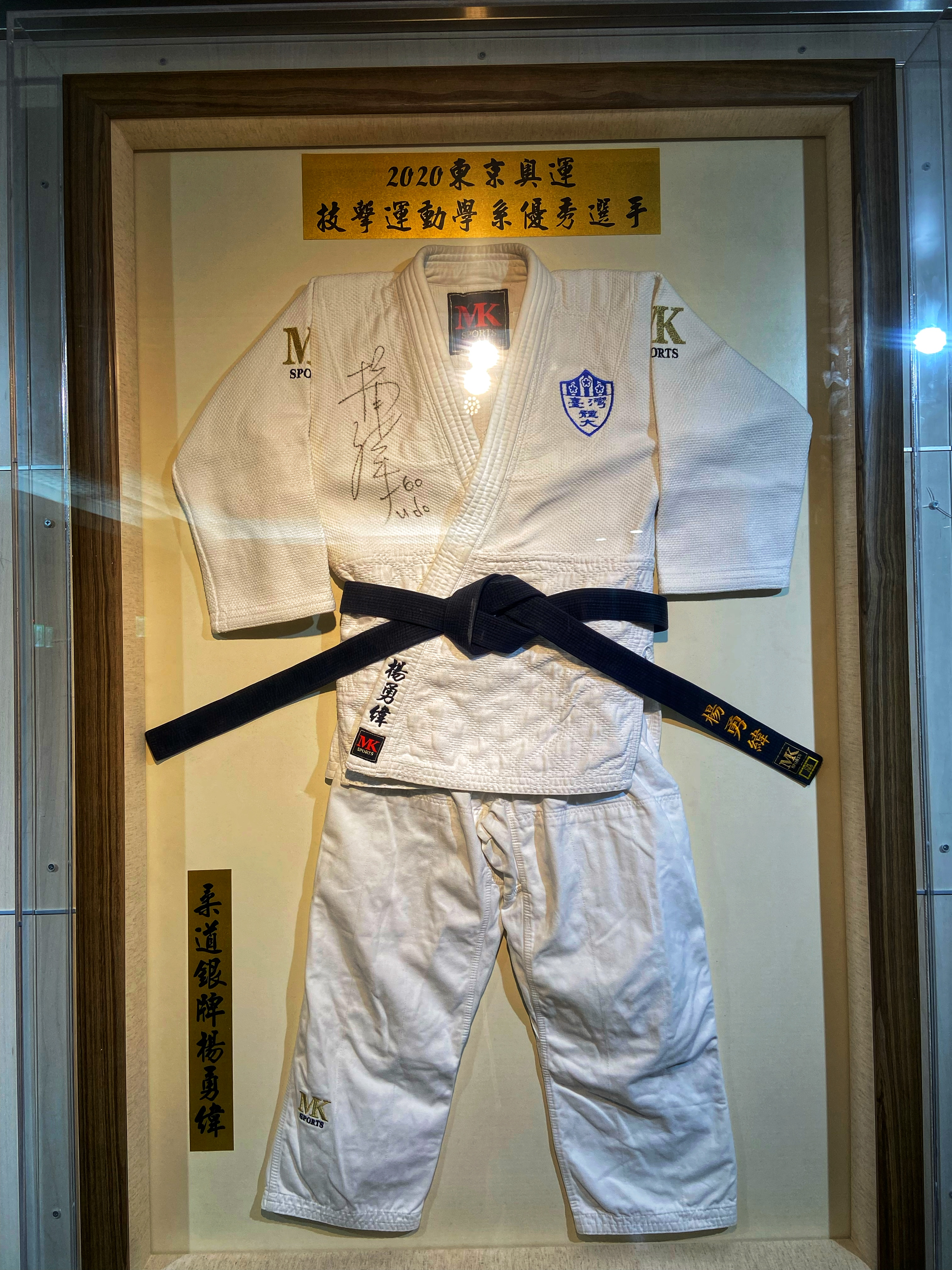
Yang's judo uniform was shown outside the Department of Combat Sport, National Taiwan University of Sport.

Yang Yung-wei (Chinese: 楊勇緯; pinyin: Yáng Yǒngwěi; Paiwan language: Drangadrang; born 28 September 1997) is a Taiwanese Paiwan judoka. He is an Olympic silver medalist in the extra lightweight event. He also won the gold medal in the men's 60 kg event at the 2022 Asian Games held in Hangzhou, People's Republic of China.

== Career ==
Yang was born in Shizi, Pingtung, and raised in Taichung. He began practicing judo while attending primary school, during his third grade year. His mother and two other siblings also had judo experience. As a Shin Min High School student, Yang was coached by Lin Shih-hsuan.

In 2017, Yang competed at the Summer Universiade held in Taipei, Taiwan. In 2018, he won one of the bronze medals in the men's 60 kg event at the Asian Games held in Jakarta, Indonesia.

At the 2019 Asian-Pacific Judo Championships held in Fujairah, United Arab Emirates, he won the silver medal in the men's 60 kg event. In that same year, he also competed in the men's 60 kg event at the 2019 World Judo Championships held in Tokyo, Japan.

In 2020, Yang won the silver medal in the men's 60 kg event at the Judo Grand Slam Düsseldorf held in Düsseldorf, Germany. In 2021, he won the silver medal in his event at the Judo World Masters held in Doha, Qatar. A few months later, he won one of the bronze medals in his event at the 2021 Judo Grand Slam Antalya held in Antalya, Turkey.

Yang won the silver medal in the men's 60 kg event at the 2020 Summer Olympics held in Tokyo, Japan. He also became the first Taiwanese judoka to win a medal in judo at the Summer Olympics, as well as the first Taiwanese medalist of the 2020 Olympics.

At the 2021 Judo Grand Slam Abu Dhabi held in Abu Dhabi, United Arab Emirates, he won the gold medal in his event. He also won the gold medal in his event at the 2022 Judo Grand Slam Antalya held in Antalya, Turkey.

He won the silver medal in the men's 60 kg event at the 2024 World Judo Championships held in Abu Dhabi, United Arab Emirates.
