= Enkhtaivany Ariunbold =

Mongolian judoka (born 1995)

Personal information
- Native name: Энхтайваны Ариунболд
- Nationality: Mongolia
- Born: 8 October 1995 (age 30) Mongolia
- Occupation: Judoka
- Height: 165 cm (5 ft 5 in)

Sport
- Country: Mongolia
- Sport: Judo
- Weight class: ‍–‍60 kg

Achievements and titles
- Olympic Games: R16 (2024)
- World Champ.: (silver) (2022)
- Asian Champ.: (bronze) (2019)
Medal record
Men's judo
Representing Mongolia
World Championships
| Silver medal – second place | 2022 Tashkent | ‍–‍60 kg |
Asian Games
| Bronze medal – third place | 2022 Hangzhou | Mixed team |
Asian Championships
| Bronze medal – third place | 2019 Fujairah | ‍–‍60 kg |
| Bronze medal – third place | 2019 Fujairah | Mixed team |
World Masters
| Silver medal – second place | 2023 Budapest | ‍–‍60 kg |
IJF Grand Slam
| Silver medal – second place | 2025 Abu Dhabi | ‍–‍60 kg |
| Bronze medal – third place | 2021 Paris | ‍–‍60 kg |
| Bronze medal – third place | 2025 Dushanbe | ‍–‍60 kg |
IJF Grand Prix
| Bronze medal – third place | 2019 Zagreb | ‍–‍60 kg |
Military World Games
| Bronze medal – third place | 2019 Wuhan | ‍–‍60 kg |

Profile at external databases
- IJF: 27365
- JudoInside.com: 100818
- Updated on 28 November 2025

Enkhtaivany Ariunbold (Mongolian: Энхтайваны Ариунболд; born 8 October 1995) is a Mongolian judoka.

Enkhtaivany won a bronze medal at the 2021 Judo Grand Slam Paris in the ‍–‍60 kg category.
