= Giorgi Sardalashvili =

Georgian judoka (born 2003)

Personal information
- Born: 26 May 2003 (age 23)
- Occupation: Judoka
- Height: 1.65 m (5 ft 5 in)

Sport
- Country: Georgia
- Sport: Judo
- Weight class: ‍–‍60 kg

Achievements and titles
- Olympic Games: 5th (2024)
- World Champ.: (gold) (2024)
- European Champ.: (gold) (2025)
Medal record
Men's judo
Representing Georgia
World Championships
Gold medal – first place	2024 Abu Dhabi	‍–‍60 kg
Bronze medal – third place	2023 Doha	‍–‍60 kg
Bronze medal – third place	2026 Baku	‍–‍60 kg
European Championships
Gold medal – first place	2025 Podgorica	‍–‍60 kg
Silver medal – second place	2026 Tbilisi	‍–‍60 kg
IJF Grand Slam
Gold medal – first place	2022 Abu Dhabi	‍–‍60 kg
Silver medal – second place	2022 Tbilisi	‍–‍60 kg
Silver medal – second place	2023 Tbilisi	‍–‍60 kg
Silver medal – second place	2024 Tashkent	‍–‍60 kg
Bronze medal – third place	2025 Abu Dhabi	‍–‍60 kg
IJF Grand Prix
Bronze medal – third place	2022 Zagreb	‍–‍60 kg
World Juniors Championships
Gold medal – first place	2021 Olbia	‍–‍60 kg
Silver medal – second place	2022 Guayaquil	‍–‍60 kg
European Junior Championships
Silver medal – second place	2021 Luxembourg	‍–‍60 kg

Profile at external databases
- IJF: 50970
- JudoInside.com: 135310
- Updated on 4 October 2026

Giorgi Sardalashvili (born 26 May 2003) is a Georgian judoka. He won the gold medal in the men's 60 kg event at the 2024 World Judo Championships held in Abu Dhabi, United Arab Emirates.

In 2020, he took first place in the 50 kg weight category at the European Cup among young people in Antalya. A year later, he managed to win the first place in the 60 kg weight category at the European Cup (youth) held in Prague. Took second place at the 2021 European Junior Championships (60 kg) held in Luxembourg. Took first place at the 2021 World Juniors Championships (60 kg) held in Olbia, Italy. In 2022, he managed to take first place at the European Cup (youth) held in Málaga, Spain. At the tournament, Sardalashvili defeated Alejandro Prieto Simancas (Spain), Ricardo Pires (Portugal), Florian Boecker (Germany) and Luis Barroso Lopez (Spain) with ippons, and in the final he managed to defeat Japan's Keiji Tsujioka with waza-ari. In the same year, he took second place at the 2022 Tbilisi Grand Slam. At the 2022 World Juniors Championships, which was held in Guayaquil, Ecuador, Sardalashvili took second place.

Sardalashvili is a winner of a 2022 Zagreb Grand Prix bronze medal. He participated in the tournament from the second round, where he defeated Tajik Muamadsoleh Kuvatov. Which was followed by the defeat of Brazilian Matheus Takakisa at the next stage. After losing to French Maxim Merlin in the quarterfinals with waza-ari, he defeated Turkmen Hukaberdi Yumaev in the repechage, giving him an ippon. In the fight for the bronze medal, he defeated the Spanish judoka Francisco Garrigós by ippon.

Sardalashvili won one of the bronze medals in the men's 60 kg event at the 2023 World Championships held in Doha, Qatar.

Sardalashvili placed fifth at 2024 Summer Olympics.

== Medals ==
2022
(gold) Grand Slam Abu Dhabi
(silver) Grand Slam Tbilisi
(bronze) Grand Prix Zagreb
