= Salih Yıldız =

Turkish judoka (born 2001)

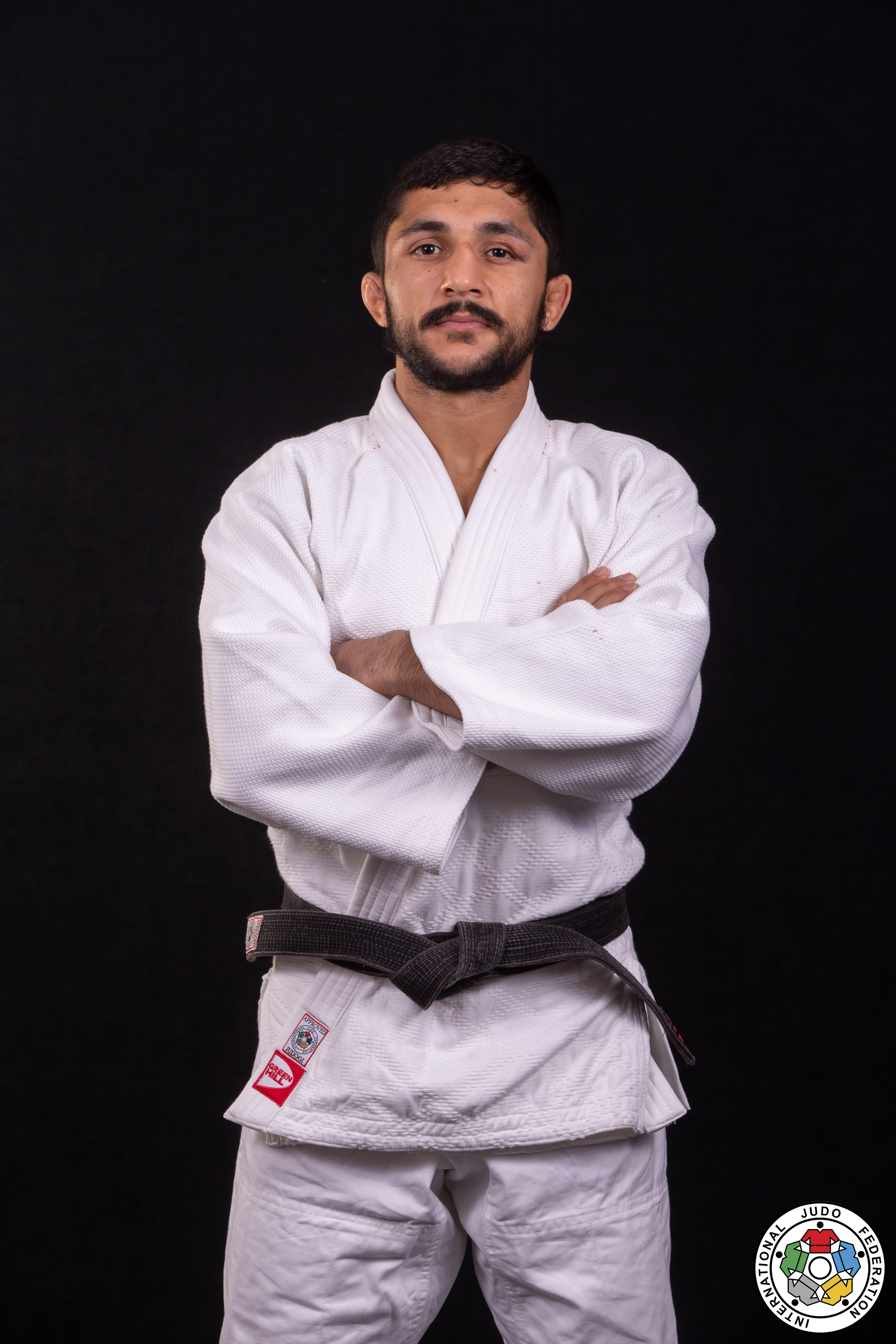

Personal information
- Born: 1 January 2001 (age 25) Iğdır, Turkey
- Occupation: Judoka

Sport
- Country: Turkey
- Sport: Judo
- Weight class: ‍–‍60 kg

Achievements and titles
- Olympic Games: 5th (2024)
- World Champ.: R16 (2023)
- European Champ.: (bronze) (2024)
Medal record
Men's judo
Representing Turkey
European Championships
Bronze medal – third place	2024 Zagreb	‍–‍60 kg
IJF Grand Slam
Bronze medal – third place	2022 Abu Dhabi	‍–‍60 kg
Bronze medal – third place	2023 Tel Aviv	‍–‍60 kg
Bronze medal – third place	2024 Tashkent	‍–‍60 kg
Bronze medal – third place	2024 Antalya	‍–‍60 kg
Bronze medal – third place	2025 Abu Dhabi	‍–‍60 kg
IJF Grand Prix
Bronze medal – third place	2023 Zagreb	‍–‍60 kg
World Juniors Championships
Bronze medal – third place	2019 Marrakesh	‍–‍60 kg
European Junior Championships
Gold medal – first place	2019 Vantaa	‍–‍60 kg
Bronze medal – third place	2020 Poreč	‍–‍60 kg
European Cadet Championships
Bronze medal – third place	2018 Sarajevo	‍–‍60 kg
Mediterranean Games
Bronze medal – third place	2026 Taranto	‍–‍60 kg
Islamic Solidarity Games
Gold medal – first place	2025 Riyadh	‍–‍60 kg

Profile at external databases
- IJF: 29923
- JudoInside.com: 105793
- Updated on 1 September 2026

Salih Yıldız (born 1 January 2001) is a Turkish judoka competing in the extra lightweight (‍–‍60 kg) division. He is competing in the 2024 Paris Olympic Games.

== Sport career ==
Yıldız won the gold medal in the extra lightweight (‍–‍60 kg) division at the 2019 European Junior Championships in Vantaa, Finland, and the bronze medal at the 2019 World Juniors Championships in Marrakesh, Morocco. The next year, he took the bronze medal at the 2020 European Junior Championships in Poreč, Croatia. He claimed the gold medal at the European Open in Riccione, Italy in 2022. The same year, he took the bronze medal at the 2022 Abu Dhabi Grand Slam in the United Arab Emirates. He received bronze medals at the 2023 Tel Aviv Grand Slam in Israel and the 2023 Zagreb Grand Prix in Croatia. In 2024 Yıldız took bronze medals at the 2024 Tashkent Grand Slam, in Uzbekistan and the 2024 Antalya Grand Slam in Turkey. At the 2024 European Championships in Zagreb, Croatia, he won the bronze medal.

Yıldız qualified to participate at the 2024 Summer Olympics in Paris, France. Yıldız ranked 5th in the 2024 Summer Olympics.

== Personal life ==
Salih Yıldız was born in Iğdır, eastern Turkey in 2001.
