= 2019 World Judo Championships – Men's 60 kg =

Judo competition

Judo Men's 60 kg at the 2019 World Judo Championships
- Venue: Nippon Budokan
- Location: Tokyo, Japan
- Date: 25 August
- Competitors: 74 from 57 nations
- Total prize money: 57,000$

Medalists
gold medal	Lukhumi Chkhvimiani (1st title)	Georgia
silver medal	Sharafuddin Lutfillaev	Uzbekistan
bronze medal	Yeldos Smetov	Kazakhstan
bronze medal	Ryuju Nagayama	Japan

Competition at external databases
- Links: IJF • JudoInside

The Men's 60 kg competition at the 2019 World Judo Championships was held on 25 August 2019.

== Results ==
=== Finals ===
Semi-finals
(Georgia (country)) Lukhumi Chkhvimiani	01
(Japan) Ryuju Nagayama	00
(Uzbekistan) Sharafuddin Lutfillaev	10
(Kazakhstan) Gusman Kyrgyzbayev	00

Final
(Georgia (country)) Lukhumi Chkhvimiani	10
(Uzbekistan) Sharafuddin Lutfillaev	00

=== Repechage ===
Repechage
(Chinese Taipei) Yang Yung-wei	00
(Kazakhstan) Yeldos Smetov	10

Third place
(Kazakhstan) Yeldos Smetov	10
(Kazakhstan) Gusman Kyrgyzbayev	00

Repechage
(Japan) Naohisa Takato	01
(Kyrgyzstan) Kubanychbek Aibek	00

Third place
(Japan) Naohisa Takato	01
(Japan) Ryuju Nagayama	10

=== Pool A ===
First round
(Chinese Taipei) Yang Yung-wei	01
(United Kingdom) Ashley McKenzie	00
(Georgia (country)) Lukhumi Chkhvimiani	11
(Hong Kong) Lai Yiu Long	00
(Ukraine) Artem Lesiuk	10
(Senegal) Moussa Diop	00

Round of 64
(Russia) Robert Mshvidobadze	00
(Chinese Taipei) Yang Yung-wei	10
(India) Vijay Yadav	00
(France) Luka Mkheidze	10
(Uzbekistan) Diyorbek Urozboev	10
(United States) Adonis Diaz	00
(Czech Republic) David Pulkrábek	10
(Morocco) Issam Bassou	00
(Spain) Francisco Garrigós	00
(Georgia (country)) Lukhumi Chkhvimiani	01
(Brazil) Eric Takabatake	10
(Tunisia) Fraj Dhouibi	00
(Chad) Ibrahim Issa	10
(Kyrgyzstan) Doolotbek Taalaibek	00
(Ukraine) Artem Lesiuk	11
(Kenya) Carlos Atieno	00

Round of 32
(Chinese Taipei) Yang Yung-wei	10
(France) Luka Mkheidze	00
(Uzbekistan) Diyorbek Urozboev	01
(Czech Republic) David Pulkrábek	00
(Georgia (country)) Lukhumi Chkhvimiani	01
(Brazil) Eric Takabatake	00
(Chad) Ibrahim Issa	00
(Ukraine) Artem Lesiuk	10

Round of 16
(Chinese Taipei) Yang Yung-wei	10
(Uzbekistan) Diyorbek Urozboev	00
(Georgia (country)) Lukhumi Chkhvimiani	10
(Ukraine) Artem Lesiuk	00

Quarterfinals
(Chinese Taipei) Yang Yung-wei	00
(Georgia (country)) Lukhumi Chkhvimiani	01

=== Pool B ===
First round
(South Korea) Kim Won-jin	10
(Madagascar) Abdou Nazir Bin	00
(Ecuador) Steven Morocho	00
(Italy) Elios Manzi	10

Round of 64
(Japan) Ryuju Nagayama	10
(South Korea) Kim Won-jin	00
(Germany) Moritz Plafky	10
(Peru) Dilmer Calle	00
(Portugal) Rodrigo Costa Lopes	11
(Cape Verde) Alexandre De Barros	00
(Kazakhstan) Yeldos Smetov	11
(Kuwait) Saoud Al-Amiri	00
Mohamad Akkash	00
(Italy) Elios Manzi	10
(Yemen) Ali Khousrof	10
(Cameroon) Bernadin Tsala Tsala	00
(Guatemala) José Ramos	10
(Malawi) Chikondi Kathewera	00

Round of 32
(Japan) Ryuju Nagayama	10
(Germany) Moritz Plafky	00
(Portugal) Rodrigo Costa Lopes	00
(Bulgaria) Yanislav Gerchev	01
(Kazakhstan) Yeldos Smetov	10
(Italy) Elios Manzi	00
(Yemen) Ali Khousrof	10
(Guatemala) José Ramos	00

Round of 16
(Japan) Ryuju Nagayama	01
(Bulgaria) Yanislav Gerchev	00
(Kazakhstan) Yeldos Smetov	10
(Yemen) Ali Khousrof	00

Quarterfinals
(Japan) Ryuju Nagayama	10
(Kazakhstan) Yeldos Smetov	00

=== Pool C ===
First round
(Botswana) Edwin Sello	00
(Turkmenistan) Hakberdi Jumaýew	10
(Hungary) Csaba Szabó	10
(Kiribati) Nanimatang Noketi	00

Round of 64
(Japan) Naohisa Takato	10
(Turkey) Mihraç Akkuş	00
(Turkmenistan) Hakberdi Jumaýew	11
(Guyana) Darren Elcock	00
(France) Walide Khyar	11
(Poland) Tomer Golomb	00
(Netherlands) Tornike Tsjakadoea	00
(Azerbaijan) Davud Mammadsoy	10
(Uzbekistan) Sharafuddin Lutfillaev	10
Mohammad Rashnonezhad	00
(Nepal) Mohan Bam	00
(Kuwait) Omar Althufairi	10
(Philippines) Bryn Quillotes	00
(Australia) Josh Katz	10
(Israel) Daniel Ben David	01
(Hungary) Csaba Szabó	00

Round of 32
(Japan) Naohisa Takato	10
(Turkmenistan) Hakberdi Jumaýew	01
(France) Walide Khyar	10
(Azerbaijan) Davud Mammadsoy	00
(Uzbekistan) Sharafuddin Lutfillaev	11
(Kuwait) Omar Althufairi	01
(Australia) Josh Katz	10
(Israel) Daniel Ben David	00

Round of 16
(Japan) Naohisa Takato	10
(France) Walide Khyar	00
(Uzbekistan) Sharafuddin Lutfillaev	10
(Australia) Josh Katz	00

Quarterfinals
(Japan) Naohisa Takato	00
(Uzbekistan) Sharafuddin Lutfillaev	10

=== Pool D ===
First round
(Guatemala) Julio Molina	00
(Kazakhstan) Gusman Kyrgyzbayev	10
(Monaco) Yann Siccardi	10
(Portugal) Miguel Pisco	00
(Zambia) Andrew Phiri	10
(Aruba) Issac Croes	00

Round of 64
(Georgia (country)) Amiran Papinashvili	10
(Ecuador) Lenin Preciado	00
(Malawi) Martin Kuphiri	00
(Belgium) Jorre Verstraeten	11
(Kazakhstan) Gusman Kyrgyzbayev	11
(Brazil) Felipe Kitadai	01
(Bulgaria) Valentin Alipiev	01
(Bhutan) Ngawang Namgyel	00
(Mongolia) Dashdavaagiin Amartüvshin	10
(Monaco) Yann Siccardi	00
(Laos) Soukphaxay Sithisane	00
(South Korea) Choi In-hyuk	11
(Nicaragua) Luis Montes	10
(Zambia) Andrew Phiri	00
(Hong Kong) Martin Lau	00
(Kyrgyzstan) Kubanychbek Aibek	11

Round of 32
(Georgia (country)) Amiran Papinashvili	11
(Belgium) Jorre Verstraeten	00
(Kazakhstan) Gusman Kyrgyzbayev	01
(Bulgaria) Valentin Alipiev	00
(Mongolia) Dashdavaagiin Amartüvshin	10
(South Korea) Choi In-hyuk	00
(Nicaragua) Luis Montes	00
(Kyrgyzstan) Kubanychbek Aibek	11

Round of 16
(Georgia (country)) Amiran Papinashvili	00
(Kazakhstan) Gusman Kyrgyzbayev	01
(Mongolia) Dashdavaagiin Amartüvshin	00
(Kyrgyzstan) Kubanychbek Aibek	10

Quarterfinals
(Kazakhstan) Gusman Kyrgyzbayev	10
(Kyrgyzstan) Kubanychbek Aibek	00

== Prize money ==
The sums listed bring the total prizes awarded to $57,000 for the individual event.

Medal	Total	Judoka	Coach
Gold	$26,000	$20,800	$5,200
Silver	$15,000	$12,000	$3,000
Bronze	$8,000	$6,400	$1,600
