= 2018 World Judo Championships – Men's 60 kg =

Judo competition

Judo Men's 60 kg at the 2018 World Judo Championships
- Venue: National Gymnastics Arena
- Location: Baku, Azerbaijan
- Dates: 20 September
- Competitors: 68 from 52 nations
- Total prize money: 57,000€

Medalists
| gold medal | Naohisa Takato (3rd title) | Japan |
| silver medal | Robert Mshvidobadze | Russia |
| bronze medal | Amiran Papinashvili | Georgia |
| bronze medal | Ryuju Nagayama | Japan |

Competition at external databases
- Links: IJF • JudoInside

The Men's 60 kg competition at the 2018 World Judo Championships was held on 20 September 2018.

== Results ==
=== Finals ===
Semi-finals
(Japan) Ryuju Nagayama | 00
(Japan) Naohisa Takato | 01
(Russia) Robert Mshvidobadze | 10
(Georgia (country)) Amiran Papinashvili | 01

Final
(Japan) Naohisa Takato | 01
(Russia) Robert Mshvidobadze | 00

=== Repechage ===
Repechage
(North Korea) Kim Yong-gwon | 01
(Azerbaijan) Karamat Huseynov | 10

Third place
(Azerbaijan) Karamat Huseynov | 00
(Georgia (country)) Amiran Papinashvili | 01

Repechage
(South Korea) Lee Ha-rim | 10
(Brazil) Eric Takabatake | 00

Third place
(South Korea) Lee Ha-rim | 00
(Japan) Ryuju Nagayama | 10

=== Pool A ===
Preliminary round fights

| | Score | |
|---|---|---|
| Issam Bassou (Morocco) | 00–01 | (Bulgaria) Valentin Alipiev |

First round
(Japan) Ryuju Nagayama | 10
(Hungary) Csaba Szabó | 00
(Georgia (country)) Lukhumi Chkhvimiani | 10
(Bulgaria) Valentin Alipiev | 00
(Peru) Dilmer Calle | 01
(Australia) Bryan Jolly | 00
(Italy) Andrea Carlino | 00
(Ecuador) Lenin Preciado | 11
(United Kingdom) Ashley McKenzie | 10
(Turkey) Bekir Özlü | 00
(United States) Adonis Diaz | 00
(North Korea) Kim Yong-gwon | 11
(Senegal) Moussa Diop | 00
(Mozambique) Mauro Nassone | 10
(Iraq) Ahmed Al-Lami | 11
Isaac Croes | 01

Second round
(Japan) Ryuju Nagayama | 10
(Georgia (country)) Lukhumi Chkhvimiani | 00
(Peru) Dilmer Calle | 00
(Ecuador) Lenin Preciado | 10
(United Kingdom) Ashley McKenzie | 00
(North Korea) Kim Yong-gwon | 10
(Mozambique) Mauro Nassone | 00
(Iraq) Ahmed Al-Lami | 11

Third round
(Japan) Ryuju Nagayama | 01
(Ecuador) Lenin Preciado | 00
(North Korea) Kim Yong-gwon | 10
(Iraq) Ahmed Al-Lami | 00

Quarterfinals
(Japan) Ryuju Nagayama | 10
(North Korea) Kim Yong-gwon | 00

=== Pool B ===
Preliminary round fights

| | Score | |
|---|---|---|
| Choi In-hyuk (South Korea) | 01–00 | (Tajikistan) Sukhrob Boqiev |

First round
(Japan) Naohisa Takato | 10
(Slovenia) David Štarkel | 00
(Moldova) Dorin Mihu | 10
(Kyrgyzstan) Baiaman Sagynbai | 00
(Malawi) Chikondi Kathewera | 00
(Afghanistan) Alikozay Zelgai | 10
(Netherlands) Roy Koffijberg | 01
(Syria) Mohamad Akkash | 00
(Spain) Francisco Garrigós | 10
(Brazil) Phelipe Pelim | 00
(Chinese Taipei) Yang Yung-wei | 00
(South Korea) Choi In-hyuk | 01
(Russia) Beslan Mudranov | 11
(Ukraine) Artem Lesyuk | 00
(Azerbaijan) Karamat Huseynov | 10
(Belgium) Joran Schildermans | 00

Second round
(Japan) Naohisa Takato | 10
(Moldova) Dorin Mihu | 00
(Afghanistan) Alikozay Zelgai | 00
(Netherlands) Roy Koffijberg | 10
(Spain) Francisco Garrigós | 01
(South Korea) Choi In-hyuk | 00
(Russia) Beslan Mudranov | 00
(Azerbaijan) Karamat Huseynov | 10

Third round
(Japan) Naohisa Takato | 10
(Netherlands) Roy Koffijberg | 00
(Spain) Francisco Garrigós | 00
(Azerbaijan) Karamat Huseynov | 01

Quarterfinals
(Japan) Naohisa Takato | 11
(Azerbaijan) Karamat Huseynov | 00

=== Pool C ===
Preliminary round fights

| | Score | |
|---|---|---|
| David Pulkrábek (Czech Republic) | 01–00 | (Guatemala) Julio Molina |

First round
(Russia) Robert Mshvidobadze | 10
(Bangladesh) Md Jomir Uddin Rony | 00
(France) Luka Mkheidze | 11
(Niger) Moctar Allassane | 00
(North Korea) An Jae-yong | 00
(Yemen) Ali Khousrof | 10
(Germany) Moritz Plafky | 10
(Hong Kong) Martin Lau | 00
(Uzbekistan) Sharafuddin Lutfillaev | 10
(Portugal) Gonçalo Mansinho | 00
(Slovenia) Matjaž Trbovc | 00
(Kyrgyzstan) Otar Bestaev | 01
(South Korea) Lee Ha-rim | 11
(Zimbabwe) Lazarus Arufandika | 00
(Netherlands) Tornike Tsjakadoea | 10
(Czech Republic) David Pulkrábek | 00

Second round
(Russia) Robert Mshvidobadze | 01
(France) Luka Mkheidze | 00
(Yemen) Ali Khousrof | 00
(Germany) Moritz Plafky | 10
(Uzbekistan) Sharafuddin Lutfillaev | 00
(Kyrgyzstan) Otar Bestaev | 01
(South Korea) Lee Ha-rim | 01
(Netherlands) Tornike Tsjakadoea | 00

Third round
(Russia) Robert Mshvidobadze | 01
(Germany) Moritz Plafky | 00
(Kyrgyzstan) Otar Bestaev | 00
(South Korea) Lee Ha-rim | 10

Quarterfinals
(Russia) Robert Mshvidobadze | 10
(South Korea) Lee Ha-rim | 00

=== Pool D ===
Preliminary round fights

| | Score | |
|---|---|---|
| Mohan Bam (Nepal) | 00–10 | (Iraq) Mohammed Al-Sultani |

First round
(Georgia (country)) Amiran Papinashvili | 10
(Malawi) Emmanuel Ndawu | 00
(Bulgaria) Yanislav Gerchev | 11
(Iraq) Mohammed Al-Sultani | 00
(Mongolia) Bayaraa Amartuvshin | 00
(Azerbaijan) Orkhan Safarov | 10
(Botswana) Edwin Sello | 00
(Madagascar) Abdou Nazir Bin | 10
(Kazakhstan) Gusman Kyrgyzbayev | 10
(Turkey) Ahmet Şahin Kaba | 00
(Monaco) Yann Siccardi | 10
(Saudi Arabia) Mutaz Khawjah | 00
(China) Shang Yi | 00
(Brazil) Eric Takabatake | 01
(Morocco) Yassine Moudatir | 00
(Belgium) Jorre Verstraeten | 10

Second round
(Georgia (country)) Amiran Papinashvili | 10
(Bulgaria) Yanislav Gerchev | 00
(Azerbaijan) Orkhan Safarov | 10
(Madagascar) Abdou Nazir Bin | 00
(Kazakhstan) Gusman Kyrgyzbayev | 10
(Monaco) Yann Siccardi | 00
(Brazil) Eric Takabatake | 10
(Belgium) Jorre Verstraeten | 00

Third round
(Georgia (country)) Amiran Papinashvili | 10
(Azerbaijan) Orkhan Safarov | 00
(Kazakhstan) Gusman Kyrgyzbayev | 00
(Brazil) Eric Takabatake | 10

Quarterfinals
(Georgia (country)) Amiran Papinashvili | 01
(Brazil) Eric Takabatake | 00

== Prize money ==
The sums listed bring the total prizes awarded to 57,000€ for the individual event.

| Medal | Total | Judoka | Coach |
|---|---|---|---|
| Gold | 26,000€ | 20,800€ | 5,200€ |
| Silver | 15,000€ | 12,000€ | 3,000€ |
| Bronze | 8,000€ | 6,400€ | 1,600€ |
