= 2020 European Judo Championships – Men's 60 kg =

Judo competition

Judo Men's 60 kg at the 2020 European Judo Championships
- Venue: O2 Arena
- Location: Prague, Czech Republic
- Date: 19 November
- Competitors: 23 from 17 nations

Medalists
gold medal	Robert Mshvidobadze (2nd title)	Russia
silver medal	Yago Abuladze	Russia
bronze medal	Francisco Garrigós	Spain
bronze medal	Jorre Verstraeten	Belgium

Competition at external databases
- Links: IJF • JudoInside

The men's 60 kg competition at the 2020 European Judo Championships was held on 19 November at the O2 Arena.

== Results ==
=== Final ===
Final
Robert Mshvidobadze (RUS)	10
Yago Abuladze (RUS)	01

=== Repechage ===
Repechage
Savva Karakizidi (GRE)	00
Artem Lesiuk (UKR)	10

Third place
Artem Lesiuk (UKR)	00
Francisco Garrigós (ESP)	11

Repechage
Angelo Pantano (ITA)	00
Jorre Verstraeten (BEL)	01

Third place
Jorre Verstraeten (BEL)	11
Yanislav Gerchev (BUL)	00

=== Top half ===
Round of 32
Mihraç Akkuş (TUR)	10
Matan Shani (ISR)	00
Nemanja Milić (SRB)	00
Savva Karakizidi (GRE)	10
Yanislav Gerchev (BUL)	10
Biagio D'Angelo (ITA)	00
Moritz Plafky (GER)	01
Artem Lesiuk (UKR)	10

Round of 16
Robert Mshvidobadze (RUS)	01
Mihraç Akkuş (TUR)	00
Walide Khyar (FRA)	00
Savva Karakizidi (GRE)	01
Lukhumi Chkhvimiani (GEO)	00
Yanislav Gerchev (BUL)	10
Tornike Tsjakadoea (NED)	00
Artem Lesiuk (UKR)	10

Quarterfinals
Robert Mshvidobadze (RUS)	01
Savva Karakizidi (GRE)	00
Yanislav Gerchev (BUL)	01
Artem Lesiuk (UKR)	00

Semifinals
Robert Mshvidobadze (RUS)	10
Yanislav Gerchev (BUL)	00

=== Bottom half ===
Round of 32
David Štarkel (SLO)	10
Borislav Yanakov (BUL)	00
Angelo Pantano (ITA)	01
Christos Ploumpis (GRE)	00
Salih Yıldız (TUR)	10
David Pulkrábek (CZE)	01

Round of 16
Francisco Garrigós (ESP)	10
David Štarkel (SLO)	00
Luka Mkheidze (FRA)	00
Angelo Pantano (ITA)	10
Yago Abuladze (RUS)	01
Rodrigo Costa Lopes (POR)	00
Jorre Verstraeten (BEL)	10
Salih Yıldız (TUR)	01

Quarterfinals
Francisco Garrigós (ESP)	10
Angelo Pantano (ITA)	00
Yago Abuladze (RUS)	01
Jorre Verstraeten (BEL)	00

Semifinals
Francisco Garrigós (ESP)	00
Yago Abuladze (RUS)	10
