= 2022 European Judo Championships – Men's 60 kg =

Judo Men's 60 kg at the 2022 European Judo Championships
- Venue: Armeets Arena
- Location: Sofia, Bulgaria
- Date: 29 April
- Competitors: 27 from 20 nations

Medalists
gold medal	Francisco Garrigós (2nd title)	Spain
silver medal	Yanislav Gerchev	Bulgaria
bronze medal	Cédric Revol	France
bronze medal	Jorre Verstraeten	Belgium

Competition at external databases
- Links: IJF • JudoInside

The men's 60 kg competition at the 2022 European Judo Championships was held on 29 April at the Armeets Arena.

== Results ==
=== Finals ===
Semi-finals
Yanislav Gerchev (BUL)	10
Jorre Verstraeten (BEL)	00
Francisco Garrigós (ESP)	10
Lukhumi Chkhvimiani (GEO)	00

Final
Yanislav Gerchev (BUL)	00
Francisco Garrigós (ESP)	10

=== Repechage ===
Repechage
Artem Lesiuk (UKR)	00
Cédric Revol (FRA)	10
Balabay Aghayev (AZE)	10
Tornike Tsjakadoea (NED)	00

Bronze medal
Cédric Revol (FRA)	01
Lukhumi Chkhvimiani (GEO)	00
Balabay Aghayev (AZE)	00
Jorre Verstraeten (BEL)	01

=== Pool A ===
First round
Francisco Mendes (POR)	10
Samuel Hall (GBR)	00
Yanislav Gerchev (BUL)	10
Yam Wolczak (ISR)	00
David Štarkel (SLO)	10
Nemanja Milić (SRB)	00

Round of 16
Artem Lesiuk (UKR)	10
Francisco Mendes (POR)	00
Yanislav Gerchev (BUL)	10
David Štarkel (SLO)	00

Quarterfinals
Artem Lesiuk (UKR)	00
Yanislav Gerchev (BUL)	10

=== Pool B ===
First round
Jaume Bernabeu (ESP)	00
Ahmad Yusifov (AZE)	10
Georgios Korotzidis (CYP)	00
Cédric Revol (FRA)	10

Round of 16
Jorre Verstraeten (BEL)	10
Ahmad Yusifov (AZE)	00
Jaba Papinashvili (GEO)	00
Cédric Revol (FRA)	10

Quarterfinals
Jorre Verstraeten (BEL)	01
Cédric Revol (FRA)	00

=== Pool C ===
First round
Matan Kokolayev (ISR)	01
Ashley McKenzie (GBR)	00
Balabay Aghayev (AZE)	10
Savva Karakizidi (GRE)	00
David Pulkrabek (CZE)	10
Mark Tširkin (EST)	00

Round of 16
Francisco Garrigós (ESP)	01
Matan Kokolayev (ISR)	00
Balabay Aghayev (AZE)	10
David Pulkrabek (CZE)	00

Quarterfinals
Francisco Garrigós (ESP)	10
Balabay Aghayev (AZE)	00

=== Pool D ===
First round
Dilshot Khalmatov (UKR)	01
Angelo Pantano (ITA)	00
Tornike Tsjakadoea (NED)	01
Rodrigo Costa Lopes (POR)	00
Mihraç Akkuş (TUR)	00
Daniel Leutgeb (AUT)	01

Round of 16
Lukhumi Chkhvimiani (GEO)	01
Dilshot Khalmatov (UKR)	00
Tornike Tsjakadoea (NED)	01
Daniel Leutgeb (AUT)	00

Quarterfinals
Lukhumi Chkhvimiani (GEO)	01
Tornike Tsjakadoea (NED)	00
