= Judo at the 2019 European Games – Men's 60 kg =

Judo competition

Judo Men's 60 kg at the 2019 European Games
- Venue: Čyžoŭka-Arena
- Location: Minsk, Belarus
- Date: 22 June
- Competitors: 26 from 18 nations

Medalists
| gold medal | Lukhumi Chkhvimiani (1st title) | Georgia |
| silver medal | Francisco Garrigós | Spain |
| bronze medal | Amiran Papinashvili | Georgia |
| bronze medal | Jorre Verstraeten | Belgium |

Competition at external databases
- Links: IJF • JudoInside

The men's 60 kg judo event at the 2019 European Games in Minsk was held on 22 June at the Čyžoŭka-Arena.

== Results ==
=== Final ===
| Final |
| Lukhumi Chkhvimiani (GEO) | 01 |
| Francisco Garrigós (ESP) | 00 |

=== Repechage ===
Repechage
Amiran Papinashvili (GEO) | 10
Tornike Tsjakadoea (NED) | 01

Third place
Amiran Papinashvili (GEO) | 01
Moritz Plafky (GER) | 00

Repechage
Jorre Verstraeten (BEL) | 10
Luka Mkheidze (FRA) | 00

Third place
Jorre Verstraeten (BEL) | 10
Walide Khyar (FRA) | 00

=== Top half ===
Round of 32
Joaquín Gomis (ESP) | 00
Daniel Ben David (ISR) | 01
Walide Khyar (FRA) | 11
Artem Lesiuk (UKR) | 00
Csaba Szabó (HUN) | 00
David Pulkrábek (CZE) | 10
Mihraç Akkuş (TUR) | 10
Valentin Alipiev (BUL) | 00
Matjaž Trbovc (SLO) | 00
Karamat Huseynov (AZE) | 01

Round of 16
Amiran Papinashvili (GEO) | 10
Daniel Ben David (ISR) | 00
Walide Khyar (FRA) | 10
David Pulkrábek (CZE) | 00
Lukhumi Chkhvimiani (GEO) | 10
Mihraç Akkuş (TUR) | 00
Tornike Tsjakadoea (NED) | 10
Karamat Huseynov (AZE) | 00

Quarterfinals
Amiran Papinashvili (GEO) | 00
Walide Khyar (FRA) | 10
Lukhumi Chkhvimiani (GEO) | 10
Tornike Tsjakadoea (NED) | 00

Semifinals
Walide Khyar (FRA) | 00
Lukhumi Chkhvimiani (GEO) | 01

=== Bottom half ===
Round of 32
Bekir Özlü (TUR) | 00
Roy Koffijberg (NED) | 10
Jorre Verstraeten (BEL) | 10
Yanislav Gerchev (BUL) | 00
David Štarkel (SLO) | 00
Orkhan Safarov (AZE) | 10
Moritz Plafky (GER) | 11
Gonçalo Mansinho (POR) | 00
Luka Mkheidze (FRA) | 01
Yann Siccardi (MON) | 00

Round of 16
Francisco Garrigós (ESP) | 10
Roy Koffijberg (NED) | 00
Jorre Verstraeten (BEL) | 10
Orkhan Safarov (AZE) | 00
Albert Oguzov (RUS) | 00
Moritz Plafky (GER) | 01
Ashley McKenzie (GBR) | 00
Luka Mkheidze (FRA) | 10

Quarterfinals
Francisco Garrigós (ESP) | 10
Jorre Verstraeten (BEL) | 00
Moritz Plafky (GER) | 10
Luka Mkheidze (FRA) | 00

Semifinals
Francisco Garrigós (ESP) | 01
Moritz Plafky (GER) | 00
