= 2021 European Judo Championships – Men's 60 kg =

Judo Men's 60 kg at the 2021 European Judo Championships
- Venue: Altice Arena
- Location: Lisbon, Portugal
- Date: 16 April
- Competitors: 22 from 17 nations

Medalists
gold medal	Francisco Garrigós (1st title)	Spain
silver medal	Luka Mkheidze	France
bronze medal	Yago Abuladze	Russia
bronze medal	Karamat Huseynov	Azerbaijan

Competition at external databases
- Links: IJF • JudoInside

The men's 60 kg competition at the 2021 European Judo Championships was held on 16 April at the Altice Arena.

== Results ==
=== Final ===
Final
Luka Mkheidze (FRA)	00
Francisco Garrigós (ESP)	10

=== Repechage ===
Repechage
Yago Abuladze (RUS)	11
Walide Khyar (FRA)	00

Third place
Yago Abuladze (RUS)	11
Matan Kokolayev (ISR)	00

Repechage
Karamat Huseynov (AZE)	11
Angelo Pantano (ITA)	00

Third place
Karamat Huseynov (AZE)	10
Yanislav Gerchev (BUL)	01

=== Top half ===
Round of 32
Salih Yıldız (TUR)	00
Rodrigo Costa Lopes (POR)	01
Alessandro Aramu (ITA)	11
Maximilian Heyder (GER)	00
Justo Núñez (ESP)	10
Christos Ploumpis (GRE)	00

Round of 16
Yago Abuladze (RUS)	10
David Štarkel (SLO)	00
Yanislav Gerchev (BUL)	10
Rodrigo Costa Lopes (POR)	00
Walide Khyar (FRA)	01
Alessandro Aramu (ITA)	00
Luka Mkheidze (FRA)	01
Justo Núñez (ESP)	00

Quarterfinals
Yago Abuladze (RUS)	00
Yanislav Gerchev (BUL)	10
Walide Khyar (FRA)	00
Luka Mkheidze (FRA)	10

Semifinals
Yanislav Gerchev (BUL)	00
Luka Mkheidze (FRA)	01

=== Bottom half ===
Round of 32
Savva Karakizidi (GRE)	01
Yann Siccardi (MON)	00
Nicolae Foca (MDA)	00
Karamat Huseynov (AZE)	10
Angelo Pantano (ITA)	10
David Pulkrábek (CZE)	01

Round of 16
Francisco Garrigós (ESP)	10
Savva Karakizidi (GRE)	00
Mihraç Akkuş (TUR)	00
Karamat Huseynov (AZE)	01
Temur Nozadze (GEO)	00
Matan Kokolayev (ISR)	10
Artem Lesiuk (UKR)	00
Angelo Pantano (ITA)	01

Quarterfinals
Francisco Garrigós (ESP)	10
Karamat Huseynov (AZE)	00
Matan Kokolayev (ISR)	10
Angelo Pantano (ITA)	00

Semifinals
Francisco Garrigós (ESP)	10
Matan Kokolayev (ISR)	00
