= 2021 World Judo Championships – Men's 60 kg =

Judo competition

Judo Men's 60 kg at the 2021 World Judo Championships
- Venue: László Papp Budapest Sports Arena
- Location: Budapest, Hungary
- Date: 6 June
- Competitors: 46 from 35 nations
- Total prize money: 57,000€

Medalists
gold medal	Yago Abuladze (1st title)
silver medal	Gusman Kyrgyzbayev	Kazakhstan
bronze medal	Karamat Huseynov	Azerbaijan
bronze medal	Francisco Garrigós	Spain

Competition at external databases
- Links: IJF • JudoInside

The Men's 60 kg competition at the 2021 World Judo Championships was held on 6 June 2021.

== Results ==
=== Finals ===
Semi-finals
(France) Walide Khyar	00
(Kazakhstan) Gusman Kyrgyzbayev	01
(Kazakhstan) Magzhan Shamshadin	00
Yago Abuladze	10

Final
(Kazakhstan) Gusman Kyrgyzbayev	00
Yago Abuladze	10

=== Repechage ===
Repechage
(Azerbaijan) Karamat Huseynov	01
(Mongolia) Lkhagvajamtsyn Önöbold	00

Third place
(Azerbaijan) Karamat Huseynov	01
(Kazakhstan) Magzhan Shamshadin	00

Repechage
(Spain) Francisco Garrigós	01
(Bulgaria) Yanislav Gerchev	00

Third place
(Spain) Francisco Garrigós	01
(France) Walide Khyar	00

=== Pool A ===
First round
Mohammad Rashnonezhad	00
(Azerbaijan) Karamat Huseynov	01
(Australia) Joshua Katz	10
(Kuwait) Meshal Al-Ali	00
(Morocco) Issam Bassou	01
(Slovenia) David Štarkel	00

Second round
(Japan) Ryuju Nagayama	01
(Uzbekistan) Kemran Nurillaev	00
(Moldova) Nicolae Foca	00
(Azerbaijan) Karamat Huseynov	01
(France) Walide Khyar	10
(Australia) Joshua Katz	00
(Morocco) Issam Bassou	11
(Peru) Dilmer Calle	00

Third round
(Japan) Ryuju Nagayama	00
(Azerbaijan) Karamat Huseynov	01
(France) Walide Khyar	11
(Morocco) Issam Bassou	01

Quarterfinals
(Azerbaijan) Karamat Huseynov	01
(France) Walide Khyar	10

=== Pool B ===
First round
(Czech Republic) David Pulkrábek	01
(Turkey) Salih Yıldız	00
(Hong Kong) Leung Hon Man	00
(Portugal) Rodrigo Costa Lopes	11
Mohamad Akkash	00
(Ecuador) Lenin Preciado	01
(Ukraine) Dilshot Khalmatov	00
(Mongolia) Lkhagvajamtsyn Önöbold	01

Second round
(Kazakhstan) Gusman Kyrgyzbayev	10
(Czech Republic) David Pulkrábek	00
(Portugal) Rodrigo Costa Lopes	00
(Germany) Moritz Plafky	10
(Netherlands) Tornike Tsjakadoea	00
(Ecuador) Lenin Preciado	10
(Mongolia) Lkhagvajamtsyn Önöbold	10
(United States) Adonis Diaz	00

Third round
(Kazakhstan) Gusman Kyrgyzbayev	01
(Germany) Moritz Plafky	00
(Ecuador) Lenin Preciado	00
(Mongolia) Lkhagvajamtsyn Önöbold	11

Quarterfinals
(Kazakhstan) Gusman Kyrgyzbayev	11
(Mongolia) Lkhagvajamtsyn Önöbold	00

=== Pool C ===
First round
(Turkey) Mihraç Akkuş	10
(Cape Verde) Alexandre De Barros	00
(Guatemala) José Ramos	00
(Israel) Matan Kokolayev	10
(Serbia) Nemanja Milić	00
(Ukraine) Artem Lesiuk	11

Second round
(Spain) Francisco Garrigós	10
(Turkey) Mihraç Akkuş	01
(Israel) Matan Kokolayev	10
(Japan) Genki Koga	00
(Belgium) Jorre Verstraeten	01
(Ecuador) Steven Morocho	00
(Kazakhstan) Magzhan Shamshadin	11
(Ukraine) Artem Lesiuk	00

Third round
(Spain) Francisco Garrigós	10
(Israel) Matan Kokolayev	00
(Belgium) Jorre Verstraeten	00
(Kazakhstan) Magzhan Shamshadin	01

Quarterfinals
(Spain) Francisco Garrigós	00
(Kazakhstan) Magzhan Shamshadin	01

=== Pool D ===
First round
(France) Romaric Bouda	11
(Azerbaijan) Davud Mammadsoy	01
(United Kingdom) Ashley McKenzie	10
(Morocco) Younes Saddiki	01
(South Korea) Lee Ha-rim	10
(Kuwait) Omar Al-Dhufairi	00
(Nicaragua) Luis Montes	00
Khaled Ahmad	01

Second round
Yago Abuladze	10
(France) Romaric Bouda	00
(United Kingdom) Ashley McKenzie	00
(Kyrgyzstan) Kubanychbek Aibek	10
(Brazil) Eric Takabatake	01
(South Korea) Lee Ha-rim	00
(Bulgaria) Yanislav Gerchev	10
Khaled Ahmad	00

Third round
Yago Abuladze	10
(Kyrgyzstan) Kubanychbek Aibek	00
(Brazil) Eric Takabatake	00
(Bulgaria) Yanislav Gerchev	10

Quarterfinals
Yago Abuladze	01
(Bulgaria) Yanislav Gerchev	00

== Prize money ==
The sums listed bring the total prizes awarded to 57,000€ for the individual event.

Medal	Total	Judoka	Coach
Gold	26,000€	20,800€	5,200€
Silver	15,000€	12,000€	3,000€
Bronze	8,000€	6,400€	1,600€
