= Judo at the 2020 Summer Olympics – Men's 60 kg =

Judo competition

Men's 60 kg at the Games of the XXXII Olympiad
- Venue: Nippon Budokan
- Date: 24 July 2021
- Competitors: 23 from 23 nations

Medalists
1st place, gold medalist(s)		Naohisa Takato	Japan
2nd place, silver medalist(s)		Yang Yung-wei	Chinese Taipei
3rd place, bronze medalist(s)		Yeldos Smetov	Kazakhstan
3rd place, bronze medalist(s)		Luka Mkheidze	France

The men's 60 kg competition in judo at the 2020 Summer Olympics was held on 24 July 2021 at the Nippon Budokan, in Tokyo, Japan.

== Results ==
=== Finals ===
Semi-finals
8 Yang Yung-wei (TPE)	01
Luka Mkheidze (FRA)	00
2 Naohisa Takato (JPN)	01
3 Yeldos Smetov (KAZ)	00

Gold medal
8 Yang Yung-wei (TPE)	00
2 Naohisa Takato (JPN)	10

=== Repechage ===
Repechage
Tornike Tsjakadoea (NED)	10
Artem Lesiuk (UKR)	00

Bronze medal
3 Yeldos Smetov (KAZ)	01
Tornike Tsjakadoea (NED)	00

Repechage
7 Lukhumi Chkhvimiani (GEO)	00
6 Kim Won-jin (KOR)	10

Bronze medal
Luka Mkheidze (FRA)	10
6 Kim Won-jin (KOR)	00

=== Pool A ===
Round of 32
Amartuvshin Dashdavaa (MGL)	00
Tornike Tsjakadoea (NED)	01
Lenin Preciado (ECU)	00
Yanislav Gerchev (BUL)	10

Round of 16
1 Robert Mshvidobadze (ROC)	00
Tornike Tsjakadoea (NED)	01
8 Yang Yung-wei (TPE)	10
Yanislav Gerchev (BUL)	00

Quarter-finals
Tornike Tsjakadoea (NED)	00
8 Yang Yung-wei (TPE)	10

=== Pool B ===
Round of 32
Artem Lesiuk (UKR)	10
José Ramos (GUA)	00

Round of 16
4 Francisco Garrigos (ESP)	00
Luka Mkheidze (FRA)	01
5 Sharafuddin Lutfillaev (UZB)	00
Artem Lesiuk (UKR)	01

Quarter-finals
Luka Mkheidze (FRA)	10
Artem Lesiuk (UKR)	00

=== Pool C ===
Round of 32
Jorre Verstraeten (BEL)	01
Moritz Plafky (GER)	00
Ashley McKenzie (GBR)	00
Karamat Huseynov (AZE)	01

Round of 16
2 Naohisa Takato (JPN)	10
Jorre Verstraeten (BEL)	00
7 Lukhumi Chkhvimiani (GEO)	10
Karamat Huseynov (AZE)	00

Quarter-finals
2 Naohisa Takato (JPN)	10
7 Lukhumi Chkhvimiani (GEO)	00

=== Pool D ===
Round of 32
Mihraç Akkuş (TUR)	10
Ngawang Namgyel (BHU)	00
Soukphaxay Sithisane (LAO)	00
Eric Takabatake (BRA)	10

Round of 16
3 Yeldos Smetov (KAZ)	10
Mihraç Akkuş (TUR)	00
6 Kim Won-jin (KOR)	10
Eric Takabatake (BRA)	00

Quarter-finals
3 Yeldos Smetov (KAZ)	10
6 Kim Won-jin (KOR)	00
