= Diana Dzhigaros =

Russian judoka (born 1995)

Personal information
- Born: 2 January 1995 (age 31) Riga, Latvia
- Occupation: Judoka
- Height: 160 cm (5 ft 3 in)

Sport
- Country: Russia
- Sport: Judo
- Weight class: ‍–‍57 kg, ‍–‍63 kg
Medal record
Women's judo
Representing Russia
IJF Grand Slam
Bronze medal – third place	2016 Tyumen	‍–‍63 kg
Bronze medal – third place	2019 Abu Dhabi	‍–‍57 kg
IJF Grand Prix
Silver medal – second place	2016 Zagreb	‍–‍63 kg
European U23 Championships
Bronze medal – third place	2016 Tel Aviv	‍–‍63 kg
Bronze medal – third place	2017 Podgorica	‍–‍63 kg
World Juniors Championships
Silver medal – second place	2015 Abu Dhabi	‍–‍63 kg
European Junior Championships
Bronze medal – third place	2014 Bucharest	‍–‍63 kg
World Cadets Championships
Silver medal – second place	2011 Kyiv	‍–‍63 kg

Profile at external databases
- IJF: 8191
- JudoInside.com: 65044
- Updated on 21 November 2022

Diana Dzhigaros (born 2 January 1995) is a Russian former judoka.

Dzhigaros is a bronze medalist from the 2019 Judo Grand Slam Abu Dhabi in the ‍–‍57 kg category.
