= 2014 European Cadet Judo Championships =

Judo competition

Judo 2014 European Cadet Judo Championships
- Venue: Ano Liosia Olympic Hall
- Location: Athens, Greece
- Dates: 4–6 July 2014
- Competitors: 429 from 43 nations

Competition at external databases
- Links: IJF • JudoInside

The 2014 European Cadet Judo Championships is an edition of the European Cadet Judo Championships, organised by the International Judo Federation. It was held in Athens, Greece from 4 to 6 July 2014.

== Medal summary ==
=== Medal table ===
* Host nation (Greece)

Rank	Nation	Gold	Silver	Bronze	Total
1	Russia (RUS)	4	5	2	11
2	Germany (GER)	3	1	4	8
3	France (FRA)	2	1	3	6
4	Azerbaijan (AZE)	2	1	0	3
5	Ukraine (UKR)	1	0	3	4
6	Italy (ITA)	1	0	2	3
6	Netherlands (NED)	1	0	2	3
6	Slovenia (SLO)	1	0	2	3
9	Turkey (TUR)	1	0	1	2
10	Georgia (GEO)	0	2	3	5
11	Poland (POL)	0	2	2	4
12	Austria (AUT)	0	1	2	3
13	Belgium (BEL)	0	1	0	1
13	Bulgaria (BUL)	0	1	0	1
13	Israel (ISR)	0	1	0	1
16	Great Britain (GBR)	0	0	2	2
17	Bosnia and Herzegovina (BIH)	0	0	1	1
17	Hungary (HUN)	0	0	1	1
17	Montenegro (MNE)	0	0	1	1
17	Serbia (SRB)	0	0	1	1
Totals (20 entries)		16	16	32	64

=== Men's events ===
Event	Gold	Silver	Bronze
−50 kg	Rustam Zabolotnyi (RUS)	Temur Nozadze (GEO)	Kyrylo Samotug (UKR)
−50 kg	Rustam Zabolotnyi (RUS)	Temur Nozadze (GEO)	Konstantin Simeonidis (RUS)
−55 kg	Natig Gurbanli (AZE)	Ayub Bliev (RUS)	Manuel Lombardo (ITA)
−55 kg	Natig Gurbanli (AZE)	Ayub Bliev (RUS)	Robinzon Beglarashvili (GEO)
−60 kg	Romaric Bouda (FRA)	Ofek Shani (ISR)	Neil MacDonald (GBR)
−60 kg	Romaric Bouda (FRA)	Ofek Shani (ISR)	Asim Mameidov (UKR)
−66 kg	Hidayat Heydarov (AZE)	Ismail Chasygov (RUS)	Daniel Jean (FRA)
−66 kg	Hidayat Heydarov (AZE)	Ismail Chasygov (RUS)	Beka Udesiani (GEO)
−73 kg	Alexandr Kolesnik (RUS)	Tim Gramkow (GER)	Nicolas Chilard (FRA)
−73 kg	Alexandr Kolesnik (RUS)	Tim Gramkow (GER)	Martin Hojak (SLO)
−81 kg	Turpal Tepkaev (RUS)	Zaur Ramazanov (RUS)	Sergii Krivchach (UKR)
−81 kg	Turpal Tepkaev (RUS)	Zaur Ramazanov (RUS)	Eduard Trippel (GER)
−90 kg	Zelym Kotsoiev (UKR)	Giorgi Gvelesiani (GEO)	Aaron Fara (AUT)
−90 kg	Zelym Kotsoiev (UKR)	Giorgi Gvelesiani (GEO)	Daviti Ramazashvili (GEO)
+90 kg	Jur Spijkers (NED)	Vakhid Daurbekov (RUS)	Alessandro Graziano (ITA)
+90 kg	Jur Spijkers (NED)	Vakhid Daurbekov (RUS)	Stephan Hegyi (AUT)

=== Women's events ===
Event	Gold	Silver	Bronze
−40 kg	Justine Deleuil (FRA)	Loïs Petit (BEL)	Cicek Akyuz (TUR)
−40 kg	Justine Deleuil (FRA)	Loïs Petit (BEL)	Marija Ivkovic (SRB)
−44 kg	Michela Fiorini (ITA)	Leyla Aliyeva (AZE)	Aniek Norder (NED)
−44 kg	Michela Fiorini (ITA)	Leyla Aliyeva (AZE)	Jana Schmitz (GER)
−48 kg	Rabia Senyayla (TUR)	Blandine Pont (FRA)	Ekaterina Dolgikh (RUS)
−48 kg	Rabia Senyayla (TUR)	Blandine Pont (FRA)	Maruša Štangar (SLO)
−52 kg	Andreja Leški (SLO)	Betina Temelkova (BUL)	Gwenaelle Patin (FRA)
−52 kg	Andreja Leški (SLO)	Betina Temelkova (BUL)	Pauline Starke (GER)
−57 kg	Thea Gercken (GER)	Anna Dabrowska (POL)	Hilde Jager (NED)
−57 kg	Thea Gercken (GER)	Anna Dabrowska (POL)	Julia Kowalczyk (POL)
−63 kg	Lara Reimann (GER)	Michaela Polleres (AUT)	Lubjana Piovesana (GBR)
−63 kg	Lara Reimann (GER)	Michaela Polleres (AUT)	Ivana Sunjevic (MNE)
−70 kg	Giovanna Scoccimarro (GER)	Ekaterina N Tokareva (RUS)	Sarah Maekelburg (GER)
−70 kg	Giovanna Scoccimarro (GER)	Ekaterina N Tokareva (RUS)	Aleksandra Samardzic (BIH)
+70 kg	Marina Bukreeva (RUS)	Anita Formela (POL)	Kamila Pasternak (POL)
+70 kg	Marina Bukreeva (RUS)	Anita Formela (POL)	Mercedesz Szigetvári (HUN)

Source Results
