= 2022 Judo Grand Slam Budapest =

Judo Competition

Judo 2022 Judo Grand Slam Budapest
- Venue: László Papp Budapest Sports Arena
- Location: Budapest, Hungary
- Dates: 8–10 July 2022
- Competitors: 406 from 61 nations
- Total prize money: 154,000€

Competition at external databases
- Links: IJF • EJU • JudoInside

The 2022 Judo Grand Slam Budapest was held at the László Papp Budapest Sports Arena in Budapest, Hungary, from 8 to 10 July 2022 as part of the IJF World Tour and during the 2024 Summer Olympics qualification period.

== Event videos ==
The event were aired on the IJF YouTube channel.

	Weight classes	Preliminaries			Final Block
Day 1	Men: -60, -66 Women: -48, -52, -57	Commentated			Commentated
Day 1	Men: -60, -66 Women: -48, -52, -57	Tatami 1	Tatami 2	Tatami 3	Commentated
Day 2	Men: -73, -81 Women: -63, -70	Commentated			Commentated
Day 2	Men: -73, -81 Women: -63, -70	Tatami 1	Tatami 2	Tatami 3	Commentated
Day 3	Men: -90, -100, +100 Women: -78, +78	Commentated			Commentated
Day 3	Men: -90, -100, +100 Women: -78, +78	Tatami 1	Tatami 2	Tatami 3	Commentated

== Medal summary ==
=== Men's events ===
Event	Gold	Silver	Bronze
Extra-lightweight (−60 kg)	Jorre Verstraeten (BEL)	Lukhumi Chkhvimiani (GEO)	Romain Valadier-Picard (FRA)
Extra-lightweight (−60 kg)	Jorre Verstraeten (BEL)	Lukhumi Chkhvimiani (GEO)	Temur Nozadze (GEO)
Half-lightweight (−66 kg)	Hifumi Abe (JPN)	Rakhimjon Subhonov (UZB)	Ganboldyn Kherlen (MGL)
Half-lightweight (−66 kg)	Hifumi Abe (JPN)	Rakhimjon Subhonov (UZB)	Tal Flicker (ISR)
Lightweight (−73 kg)	Hidayat Heydarov (AZE)	Lasha Shavdatuashvili (GEO)	Tohar Butbul (ISR)
Lightweight (−73 kg)	Hidayat Heydarov (AZE)	Lasha Shavdatuashvili (GEO)	Rustam Orujov (AZE)
Half-middleweight (−81 kg)	Guilherme Schimidt (BRA)	Saeid Mollaei (AZE)	Antonio Esposito (ITA)
Half-middleweight (−81 kg)	Guilherme Schimidt (BRA)	Saeid Mollaei (AZE)	Nugzar Tatalashvili (UAE)
Middleweight (−90 kg)	Sanshiro Murao (JPN)	Christian Parlati (ITA)	Beka Gviniashvili (GEO)
Middleweight (−90 kg)	Sanshiro Murao (JPN)	Christian Parlati (ITA)	Iván Felipe Silva Morales (CUB)
Half-heavyweight (−100 kg)	Kentaro Iida (JPN)	Varlam Liparteliani (GEO)	Nikoloz Sherazadishvili (ESP)
Half-heavyweight (−100 kg)	Kentaro Iida (JPN)	Varlam Liparteliani (GEO)	Zsombor Vég (HUN)
Heavyweight (+100 kg)	Teddy Riner (FRA)	Jelle Snippe (NED)	Magomedomar Magomedomarov (UAE)
Heavyweight (+100 kg)	Teddy Riner (FRA)	Jelle Snippe (NED)	Shokhrukhkhon Bakhtiyorov (UZB)

=== Women's events ===
Event	Gold	Silver	Bronze
Extra-lightweight (−48 kg)	Funa Tonaki (JPN)	Julia Figueroa (ESP)	Mireia Lapuerta Comas (ESP)
Extra-lightweight (−48 kg)	Funa Tonaki (JPN)	Julia Figueroa (ESP)	Bavuudorjiin Baasankhüü (MGL)
Half-lightweight (−52 kg)	Réka Pupp (HUN)	Giulia Carnà (ITA)	Angelica Delgado (USA)
Half-lightweight (−52 kg)	Réka Pupp (HUN)	Giulia Carnà (ITA)	Gefen Primo (ISR)
Lightweight (−57 kg)	Haruka Funakubo (JPN)	Rafaela Silva (BRA)	Jessica Klimkait (CAN)
Lightweight (−57 kg)	Haruka Funakubo (JPN)	Rafaela Silva (BRA)	Timna Nelson-Levy (ISR)
Half-middleweight (−63 kg)	Megumi Horikawa (JPN)	Angelika Szymańska (POL)	Maylín del Toro Carvajal (CUB)
Half-middleweight (−63 kg)	Megumi Horikawa (JPN)	Angelika Szymańska (POL)	Anriquelis Barrios (VEN)
Middleweight (−70 kg)	Saki Niizoe (JPN)	Miriam Butkereit (GER)	Barbara Matić (CRO)
Middleweight (−70 kg)	Saki Niizoe (JPN)	Miriam Butkereit (GER)	María Pérez (PUR)
Half-heavyweight (−78 kg)	Alice Bellandi (ITA)	Inbar Lanir (ISR)	Mayra Aguiar (BRA)
Half-heavyweight (−78 kg)	Alice Bellandi (ITA)	Inbar Lanir (ISR)	Shori Hamada (JPN)
Heavyweight (+78 kg)	Wakaba Tomita (JPN)	Idalys Ortiz (CUB)	Raz Hershko (ISR)
Heavyweight (+78 kg)	Wakaba Tomita (JPN)	Idalys Ortiz (CUB)	Su Xin (CHN)

Source Results

=== Medal table ===
* Host nation (Hungary)

Rank	Nation	Gold	Silver	Bronze	Total
1	Japan (JPN)	8	0	1	9
2	Italy (ITA)	1	2	1	4
3	Azerbaijan (AZE)	1	1	1	3
3	Brazil (BRA)	1	1	1	3
5	France (FRA)	1	0	1	2
5	Hungary (HUN)*	1	0	1	2
7	Belgium (BEL)	1	0	0	1
8	Georgia (GEO)	0	3	2	5
9	Israel (ISR)	0	1	5	6
10	Cuba (CUB)	0	1	2	3
10	Spain (ESP)	0	1	2	3
12	Uzbekistan (UZB)	0	1	1	2
13	Germany (GER)	0	1	0	1
13	Netherlands (NED)	0	1	0	1
13	Poland (POL)	0	1	0	1
16	Mongolia (MGL)	0	0	2	2
16	United Arab Emirates (UAE)	0	0	2	2
18	Canada (CAN)	0	0	1	1
18	China (CHN)	0	0	1	1
18	Croatia (CRO)	0	0	1	1
18	Puerto Rico (PUR)	0	0	1	1
18	United States (USA)	0	0	1	1
18	Venezuela (VEN)	0	0	1	1
Totals (23 entries)		14	14	28	56

Event		(Azerbaijan) AZE	(Brazil) BRA	(Belgium) BEL	(Canada) CAN	(China) CHN	(Croatia) CRO	(Cuba) CUB	(Spain) ESP	(France) FRA	(Georgia (country)) GEO	(Germany) GER	(Hungary) HUN	(Italy) ITA	(Israel) ISR	(Japan) JAP	(Mongolia) MGL	(Netherlands) NED	(Poland) POL	(Puerto Rico) PUR	(United Arab Emirates) UAE	(United States) USA	(Uzbekistan) UZB	(Venezuela) VEN
Men's
Men's	60 kg			1st place, gold medalist(s)						3rd place, bronze medalist(s)	2nd place, silver medalist(s) 3rd place, bronze medalist(s)													
Men's	66 kg														3rd place, bronze medalist(s)	1st place, gold medalist(s)	3rd place, bronze medalist(s)						2nd place, silver medalist(s)	
Men's	73 kg	1st place, gold medalist(s) 3rd place, bronze medalist(s)									2nd place, silver medalist(s)				3rd place, bronze medalist(s)									
Men's	81 kg	2nd place, silver medalist(s)	1st place, gold medalist(s)											3rd place, bronze medalist(s)							3rd place, bronze medalist(s)			
Men's	90 kg							3rd place, bronze medalist(s)			3rd place, bronze medalist(s)			2nd place, silver medalist(s)		1st place, gold medalist(s)								
Men's	100 kg								3rd place, bronze medalist(s)		2nd place, silver medalist(s)		3rd place, bronze medalist(s)			1st place, gold medalist(s)								
Men's	+100 kg									1st place, gold medalist(s)								2nd place, silver medalist(s)			3rd place, bronze medalist(s)		3rd place, bronze medalist(s)	
Women's
Women's	48 kg								2nd place, silver medalist(s) 3rd place, bronze medalist(s)							1st place, gold medalist(s)	3rd place, bronze medalist(s)							
Women's	52 kg												1st place, gold medalist(s)	2nd place, silver medalist(s)	3rd place, bronze medalist(s)							3rd place, bronze medalist(s)		
Women's	57 kg		2nd place, silver medalist(s)		3rd place, bronze medalist(s)										3rd place, bronze medalist(s)	1st place, gold medalist(s)								
Women's	63 kg							3rd place, bronze medalist(s)								1st place, gold medalist(s)			2nd place, silver medalist(s)					3rd place, bronze medalist(s)
Women's	70 kg						3rd place, bronze medalist(s)					2nd place, silver medalist(s)				1st place, gold medalist(s)				3rd place, bronze medalist(s)				
Women's	78 kg		3rd place, bronze medalist(s)											1st place, gold medalist(s)	2nd place, silver medalist(s)	3rd place, bronze medalist(s)								
Women's	+78 kg					3rd place, bronze medalist(s)		2nd place, silver medalist(s)							3rd place, bronze medalist(s)	1st place, gold medalist(s)								

== Prize money ==
The sums written are per medalist, bringing the total prizes awarded to 154,000€. (retrieved from:)

Medal	Total	Judoka	Coach
Gold	5,000€	4,000€	1,000€
Silver	3,000€	2,400€	600€
Bronze	1,500€	1,200€	300€
