= 2019 Judo Grand Slam Düsseldorf =

Judo competition

Judo 2019 Judo Grand Slam Düsseldorf
- Venue: ISS Dome
- Location: Düsseldorf, Germany
- Dates: 22–24 February 2019
- Competitors: 603 from 93 nations

Competition at external databases
- Links: IJF • EJU • JudoInside

The 2019 Judo Grand Slam Düsseldorf was held in Düsseldorf, Germany from 22 to 24 February 2019.

== Medal summary ==
=== Men's events ===
Event	Gold	Silver	Bronze
Extra-lightweight (−60 kg)	Ryuju Nagayama (JPN)	Robert Mshvidobadze (RUS)	Lukhumi Chkhvimiani (GEO)
Extra-lightweight (−60 kg)	Ryuju Nagayama (JPN)	Robert Mshvidobadze (RUS)	Tornike Tsjakadoea (NED)
Half-lightweight (−66 kg)	Joshiro Maruyama (JPN)	Kim Lim-hwan (KOR)	Yakub Shamilov (RUS)
Half-lightweight (−66 kg)	Joshiro Maruyama (JPN)	Kim Lim-hwan (KOR)	Yondonperenlein Baskhüü (MGL)
Lightweight (−73 kg)	Shohei Ono (JPN)	Masashi Ebinuma (JPN)	Lasha Shavdatuashvili (GEO)
Lightweight (−73 kg)	Shohei Ono (JPN)	Masashi Ebinuma (JPN)	Rustam Orujov (AZE)
Half-middleweight (−81 kg)	Sotaro Fujiwara (JPN)	Aslan Lappinagov (RUS)	Dominic Ressel (GER)
Half-middleweight (−81 kg)	Sotaro Fujiwara (JPN)	Aslan Lappinagov (RUS)	Matthias Casse (BEL)
Middleweight (−90 kg)	Mammadali Mehdiyev (AZE)	Sanshiro Murao (JPN)	Mikhail Igolnikov (RUS)
Middleweight (−90 kg)	Mammadali Mehdiyev (AZE)	Sanshiro Murao (JPN)	Jesper Smink (NED)
Half-heavyweight (−100 kg)	Kentaro Iida (JPN)	Cho Gu-ham (KOR)	Laurin Boehler (AUT)
Half-heavyweight (−100 kg)	Kentaro Iida (JPN)	Cho Gu-ham (KOR)	Zelym Kotsoiev (AZE)
Heavyweight (+100 kg)	Hisayoshi Harasawa (JPN)	Inal Tasoev (RUS)	Ölziibayaryn Düürenbayar (MGL)
Heavyweight (+100 kg)	Hisayoshi Harasawa (JPN)	Inal Tasoev (RUS)	Stephan Hegyi (AUT)

=== Women's events ===
Event	Gold	Silver	Bronze
Extra-lightweight (−48 kg)	Funa Tonaki (JPN)	Kang Yu-jeong (KOR)	Catarina Costa (POR)
Extra-lightweight (−48 kg)	Funa Tonaki (JPN)	Kang Yu-jeong (KOR)	Nathalia Brigida (BRA)
Half-lightweight (−52 kg)	Majlinda Kelmendi (KOS)	Lkhagvasürengiin Sosorbaram (MGL)	Odette Giuffrida (ITA)
Half-lightweight (−52 kg)	Majlinda Kelmendi (KOS)	Lkhagvasürengiin Sosorbaram (MGL)	Chishima Maeda (JPN)
Lightweight (−57 kg)	Tsukasa Yoshida (JPN)	Rafaela Silva (BRA)	Dorjsürengiin Sumiyaa (MGL)
Lightweight (−57 kg)	Tsukasa Yoshida (JPN)	Rafaela Silva (BRA)	Sarah-Léonie Cysique (FRA)
Half-middleweight (−63 kg)	Miku Takaichi (JPN)	Daria Davydova (RUS)	Andreja Leški (SLO)
Half-middleweight (−63 kg)	Miku Takaichi (JPN)	Daria Davydova (RUS)	Masako Doi (JPN)
Middleweight (−70 kg)	Sally Conway (GBR)	Miriam Butkereit (GER)	María Bernabéu (ESP)
Middleweight (−70 kg)	Sally Conway (GBR)	Miriam Butkereit (GER)	Ellen Santana (BRA)
Half-heavyweight (−78 kg)	Mayra Aguiar (BRA)	Anna-Maria Wagner (GER)	Klara Apotekar (SLO)
Half-heavyweight (−78 kg)	Mayra Aguiar (BRA)	Anna-Maria Wagner (GER)	Bernadette Graf (AUT)
Heavyweight (+78 kg)	Idalys Ortiz (CUB)	Sarah Asahina (JPN)	Iryna Kindzerska (AZE)
Heavyweight (+78 kg)	Idalys Ortiz (CUB)	Sarah Asahina (JPN)	Maria Suelen Altheman (BRA)

Source Results

=== Medal table ===
* Host nation (Germany)

Rank	Nation	Gold	Silver	Bronze	Total
1	Japan (JPN)	9	3	2	14
2	Brazil (BRA)	1	1	3	5
3	Azerbaijan (AZE)	1	0	3	4
4	Cuba (CUB)	1	0	0	1
4	Great Britain (GBR)	1	0	0	1
4	Kosovo (KOS)	1	0	0	1
7	Russia (RUS)	0	4	2	6
8	South Korea (KOR)	0	3	0	3
9	Germany (GER)*	0	2	1	3
10	Mongolia (MGL)	0	1	3	4
11	Austria (AUT)	0	0	3	3
12	Georgia (GEO)	0	0	2	2
12	Netherlands (NED)	0	0	2	2
12	Slovenia (SLO)	0	0	2	2
15	Belgium (BEL)	0	0	1	1
15	France (FRA)	0	0	1	1
15	Italy (ITA)	0	0	1	1
15	Portugal (POR)	0	0	1	1
15	Spain (ESP)	0	0	1	1
Totals (19 entries)		14	14	28	56
