= Kemran Nurillaev =

Uzbekistani judoka (born 1997)

Personal information
- Born: 5 February 1997 (age 29)
- Occupation: Judoka

Sport
- Country: Uzbekistan
- Sport: Judo
- Disability class: J2
- Weight class: ‍–‍60 kg

Achievements and titles
- World Champ.: R32 (2021)
- Asian Champ.: 5th (2021)
Medal record
Representing Uzbekistan
Men's para judo
Asian Para Games
Gold medal – first place	2022 Hangzhou	‍–‍60 kg
Men's judo
IJF Grand Slam
Silver medal – second place	2021 Tbilisi	‍–‍60 kg
Bronze medal – third place	2021 Tashkent	‍–‍60 kg
IJF Grand Prix
Silver medal – second place	2019 Antalya	‍–‍60 kg
Islamic Solidarity Games
Silver medal – second place	2021 Konya	‍–‍60 kg
Asian Junior Championships
Bronze medal – third place	2017 Bishkek	‍–‍60 kg
Asian Cadet Championships
Gold medal – first place	2013 Hainan	‍–‍55 kg

Profile at external databases
- IJF: 13430
- JudoInside.com: 107633
- Updated on 21 November 2022

Kemran Nurillaev (born 5 February 1997) is an Uzbek judoka.

Nurillaev is the silver medalist of the 2021 Judo Grand Slam Tbilisi in the ‍–‍60 kg category.
