= 2019 Judo Oceania Open Perth =

Judo competition

Judo 2019 Judo Oceania Open Perth
- Venue: Western Australia State Netball Centre
- Location: Jolimont, Australia
- Dates: 3–4 November 2019
- Competitors: 309 from 66 nations

Competition at external databases
- Links: IJF • EJU • JudoInside

The 2019 Judo Oceania Open Perth was a judo competition held in Jolimont, Australia from 3 to 4 November 2019. This event was for this year special included in the 2019 IJF World Tour and valued in points as a IJF Grand Prix.

== Medal summary ==
=== Men's events ===
Event	Gold	Silver	Bronze
Extra-lightweight (−60 kg)	Francisco Garrigós (ESP)	Ashley McKenzie (GBR)	Artem Lesiuk (UKR)
Extra-lightweight (−60 kg)	Francisco Garrigós (ESP)	Ashley McKenzie (GBR)	David Pulkrábek (CZE)
Half-lightweight (−66 kg)	Alberto Gaitero (ESP)	Nijat Shikhalizada (AZE)	Sebastian Seidl (GER)
Half-lightweight (−66 kg)	Alberto Gaitero (ESP)	Nijat Shikhalizada (AZE)	Adrian Gomboc (SLO)
Lightweight (−73 kg)	Bilal Çiloğlu (TUR)	Igor Wandtke (GER)	Guillaume Chaine (FRA)
Lightweight (−73 kg)	Bilal Çiloğlu (TUR)	Igor Wandtke (GER)	Martin Hojak (SLO)
Half-middleweight (−81 kg)	Alexios Ntanatsidis (GRE)	Aslan Lappinagov (RUS)	Murad Fatiyev (AZE)
Half-middleweight (−81 kg)	Alexios Ntanatsidis (GRE)	Aslan Lappinagov (RUS)	Eduardo Yudy Santos (BRA)
Middleweight (−90 kg)	Mikhail Igolnikov (RUS)	Rafael Macedo (BRA)	Piotr Kuczera (POL)
Middleweight (−90 kg)	Mikhail Igolnikov (RUS)	Rafael Macedo (BRA)	Mihael Žgank (TUR)
Half-heavyweight (−100 kg)	Alexandre Iddir (FRA)	Niyaz Ilyasov (RUS)	Mathias Madsen (DEN)
Half-heavyweight (−100 kg)	Alexandre Iddir (FRA)	Niyaz Ilyasov (RUS)	Cyrille Maret (FRA)
Heavyweight (+100 kg)	Sven Heinle (GER)	Johannes Frey (GER)	Daniel Allerstorfer (AUT)
Heavyweight (+100 kg)	Sven Heinle (GER)	Johannes Frey (GER)	Cemal Erdoğan (TUR)

=== Women's events ===
Event	Gold	Silver	Bronze
Extra-lightweight (−48 kg)	Irina Dolgova (RUS)	Maria Siderot (POR)	Julia Figueroa (ESP)
Extra-lightweight (−48 kg)	Irina Dolgova (RUS)	Maria Siderot (POR)	Katharina Menz (GER)
Half-lightweight (−52 kg)	Natalia Kuziutina (RUS)	Ana Pérez Box (ESP)	Evelyne Tschopp (SUI)
Half-lightweight (−52 kg)	Natalia Kuziutina (RUS)	Ana Pérez Box (ESP)	Angelica Delgado (USA)
Lightweight (−57 kg)	Kaja Kajzer (SLO)	Julia Kowalczyk (POL)	Ines Beischmidt (GER)
Lightweight (−57 kg)	Kaja Kajzer (SLO)	Julia Kowalczyk (POL)	Lien Chen-ling (TPE)
Half-middleweight (−63 kg)	Kathrin Unterwurzacher (AUT)	Magdalena Krssakova (AUT)	Alice Schlesinger (GBR)
Half-middleweight (−63 kg)	Kathrin Unterwurzacher (AUT)	Magdalena Krssakova (AUT)	Andreja Leški (SLO)
Middleweight (−70 kg)	Miriam Butkereit (GER)	Megan Fletcher (IRL)	Michaela Polleres (AUT)
Middleweight (−70 kg)	Miriam Butkereit (GER)	Megan Fletcher (IRL)	Roxane Taeymans (BEL)
Half-heavyweight (−78 kg)	Patrícia Sampaio (POR)	Luise Malzahn (GER)	Beata Pacut (POL)
Half-heavyweight (−78 kg)	Patrícia Sampaio (POR)	Luise Malzahn (GER)	Karla Prodan (CRO)
Heavyweight (+78 kg)	Kayra Sayit (TUR)	Rochele Nunes (POR)	Ksenia Chibisova (RUS)
Heavyweight (+78 kg)	Kayra Sayit (TUR)	Rochele Nunes (POR)	Beatriz Souza (BRA)

Source results

=== Medal table ===
* Host nation (Australia)

Rank	Nation	Gold	Silver	Bronze	Total
1	Russia (RUS)	3	2	1	6
2	Germany (GER)	2	3	3	8
3	Spain (ESP)	2	1	1	4
4	Turkey (TUR)	2	0	2	4
5	Portugal (POR)	1	2	0	3
6	Austria (AUT)	1	1	2	4
7	Slovenia (SLO)	1	0	3	4
8	France (FRA)	1	0	2	3
9	Greece (GRE)	1	0	0	1
10	Brazil (BRA)	0	1	2	3
10	Poland (POL)	0	1	2	3
12	Azerbaijan (AZE)	0	1	1	2
12	Great Britain (GBR)	0	1	1	2
14	Ireland (IRL)	0	1	0	1
15	Belgium (BEL)	0	0	1	1
15	Chinese Taipei (TPE)	0	0	1	1
15	Croatia (CRO)	0	0	1	1
15	Czech Republic (CZE)	0	0	1	1
15	Denmark (DEN)	0	0	1	1
15	Switzerland (SUI)	0	0	1	1
15	Ukraine (UKR)	0	0	1	1
15	United States (USA)	0	0	1	1
Totals (22 entries)		14	14	28	56
