= 2017 European U23 Judo Championships =

Judo 2017 European U23 Judo Championships
- Venue: Morača Sports Center
- Location: Podgorica, Montenegro
- Dates: 10–12 November 2017
- Competitors: 301 from 40 nations

Competition at external databases
- Links: IJF • JudoInside

The 2017 European U23 Judo Championships is an edition of the European U23 Judo Championships, organised by the European Judo Union. It was held in Morača Sports Center, Podgorica, Montenegro from 10 to 12 November 2017.

== Medal overview ==
=== Men ===
Event	Gold	Silver	Bronze
Extra-lightweight (−60 kg)	Gamzat Zairbekov (RUS)	Yago Abuladze (RUS)	Karamat Huseynov (AZE)
Extra-lightweight (−60 kg)	Gamzat Zairbekov (RUS)	Yago Abuladze (RUS)	Artem Lesiuk (UKR)
Half-lightweight (−66 kg)	Dzmitry Minkou (BLR)	Aleksandr Kulikovskikh (RUS)	Alim Balkarov (RUS)
Half-lightweight (−66 kg)	Dzmitry Minkou (BLR)	Aleksandr Kulikovskikh (RUS)	Strahinja Bunčić (SRB)
Lightweight (−73 kg)	Saian Ondar (RUS)	Akil Gjakova (KOS)	Daniel Powell (GBR)
Lightweight (−73 kg)	Saian Ondar (RUS)	Akil Gjakova (KOS)	Bilal Çiloğlu (TUR)
Half-middleweight (−81 kg)	Dorin Gotonoaga (MDA)	Dominik Družeta (CRO)	Joao Martinho (POR)
Half-middleweight (−81 kg)	Dorin Gotonoaga (MDA)	Dominik Družeta (CRO)	Jim Heijman (NED)
Middleweight (−90 kg)	Mikhail Igolnikov (RUS)	Yahor Varapayeu (BLR)	Piotr Kuczera (POL)
Middleweight (−90 kg)	Mikhail Igolnikov (RUS)	Yahor Varapayeu (BLR)	Rafal Kozlowski (POL)
Half-heavyweight (−100 kg)	Daniel Mukete (BEL)	Mikita Sviryd (BLR)	Niyaz Ilyasov (RUS)
Half-heavyweight (−100 kg)	Daniel Mukete (BEL)	Mikita Sviryd (BLR)	Aaron Fara (AUT)
Heavyweight (+100 kg)	Tamerlan Bashaev (RUS)	Uladzislau Tsiarpitski (BLR)	Žarko Ćulum (SRB)
Heavyweight (+100 kg)	Tamerlan Bashaev (RUS)	Uladzislau Tsiarpitski (BLR)	Gela Zaalishvili (GEO)

=== Women ===
Event	Gold	Silver	Bronze
Extra-lightweight (−48 kg)	Maria Siderot (POR)	Andrea Stojadinov (SRB)	Kelly Staddon (GBR)
Extra-lightweight (−48 kg)	Maria Siderot (POR)	Andrea Stojadinov (SRB)	Joana Diogo (POR)
Half-lightweight (−52 kg)	Distria Krasniqi (KOS)	Alexandra-Larisa Florian (ROU)	Ana Perez Box (ESP)
Half-lightweight (−52 kg)	Distria Krasniqi (KOS)	Alexandra-Larisa Florian (ROU)	Nazakat Azizova (AZE)
Lightweight (−57 kg)	Amelie Stoll (GER)	Natalia Golomidova (RUS)	Tecla Cadilla (ESP)
Lightweight (−57 kg)	Amelie Stoll (GER)	Natalia Golomidova (RUS)	Miriam Boi (ITA)
Half-middleweight (−63 kg)	Geke van den Berg (NED)	Kamila Badurova (RUS)	Diana Dzhigaros (RUS)
Half-middleweight (−63 kg)	Geke van den Berg (NED)	Kamila Badurova (RUS)	Gili Sharir (ISR)
Middleweight (−70 kg)	Hilde Jager (NED)	Michaela Polleres (AUT)	Aleksandra Samardzic (BIH)
Middleweight (−70 kg)	Hilde Jager (NED)	Michaela Polleres (AUT)	Szabina Gercsák (HUN)
Half-heavyweight (−78 kg)	Anna-Maria Wagner (GER)	Anastasiya Turchyn (UKR)	Beata Pacut (POL)
Half-heavyweight (−78 kg)	Anna-Maria Wagner (GER)	Anastasiya Turchyn (UKR)	Aleksandra Gimaletdinova (RUS)
Heavyweight (+78 kg)	Vasylyna Kyrychenko (UKR)	Raz Hershko (ISR)	Sebile Akbulut (TUR)
Heavyweight (+78 kg)	Vasylyna Kyrychenko (UKR)	Raz Hershko (ISR)	Renee Lucht (GER)

=== Medal table ===
Rank	Nation	Gold	Silver	Bronze	Total
1	Russia (RUS)	4	4	4	12
2	Belarus (BLR)	2	3	0	5
3	Germany (GER)	2	0	1	3
3	Netherlands (NED)	2	0	1	3
5	Ukraine (UKR)	1	1	1	3
6	Kosovo (KOS)	1	1	0	2
7	Portugal (POR)	1	0	2	3
8	Moldova (MDA)	1	0	0	1
9	Serbia (SRB)	0	1	2	3
10	Austria (AUT)	0	1	1	2
10	Israel (ISR)	0	1	1	2
12	Croatia (CRO)	0	1	0	1
12	Romania (ROU)	0	1	0	1
14	Poland (POL)	0	0	3	3
15	Great Britain (GBR)	0	0	2	2
15	Spain (ESP)	0	0	2	2
15	Turkey (TUR)	0	0	2	2
18	Azerbaijan (AZE)	0	0	1	1
18	Bosnia and Herzegovina (BIH)	0	0	1	1
18	Georgia (GEO)	0	0	1	1
18	Hungary (HUN)	0	0	1	1
18	Italy (ITA)	0	0	1	1
Totals (22 entries)		14	14	27	55

== Participating nations ==
There is a total of 301 participants from 40 nations.

- Albania (3)
- Austria (8)
- Azerbaijan (14)
- Belarus (7)
- Belgium (4)
- Bosnia and Herzegovina (11)
- Bulgaria (2)
- Croatia (12)
- Czech Republic (3)
- Denmark (1)
- Estonia (3)
- Finland (2)
- Georgia (10)
- Germany (11)
- Great Britain (5)
- Greece (2)
- Hungary (12)
- Israel (6)
- Italy (15)
- Kosovo (6)
- Latvia (2)
- Lithuania (7)
- Luxembourg (1)
- Macedonia (1)
- Moldova (7)
- Montenegro (18)
- Netherlands (12)
- Norway (1)
- Poland (10)
- Portugal (7)
- Romania (15)
- Russia (18)
- Serbia (11)
- Slovakia (2)
- Slovenia (3)
- Spain (14)
- Sweden (2)
- Switzerland (5)
- Turkey (15)
- Ukraine (13)
