= Tornike Tsjakadoea =

Dutch judoka (born 1996)

Personal information
- Nationality: Dutch
- Born: 5 October 1996 (age 29) Leeuwarden, Netherlands
- Occupation: Judoka

Sport
- Country: Netherlands
- Sport: Judo
- Weight class: –60 kg
- Retired: 11 December 2025

Achievements and titles
- Olympic Games: 5th (2020)
- World Champ.: R16 (2022, 2024)
- European Champ.: 7th (2019, 2022)
Medal record
Men's judo
Representing the Netherlands
World Masters
Bronze medal – third place	2021 Doha	‍–‍60 kg
IJF Grand Slam
Bronze medal – third place	2019 Düsseldorf	‍–‍60 kg
Bronze medal – third place	2019 Ekaterinburg	‍–‍60 kg
Bronze medal – third place	2020 Düsseldorf	‍–‍60 kg
Bronze medal – third place	2023 Astana	‍–‍60 kg
Bronze medal – third place	2024 Tbilisi	‍–‍60 kg
IJF Grand Prix
Gold medal – first place	2018 Cancún	‍–‍60 kg
Silver medal – second place	2019 Tel Aviv	‍–‍60 kg
Bronze medal – third place	2019 Budapest	‍–‍60 kg
Bronze medal – third place	2024 Linz	‍–‍60 kg
European U23 Championships
Bronze medal – third place	2015 Bratislava	‍–‍60 kg
Bronze medal – third place	2016 Tel Aviv	‍–‍60 kg
European Junior Championships
Gold medal – first place	2016 Málaga	‍–‍60 kg
World Cadets Championships
Bronze medal – third place	2013 Miami	‍–‍55 kg

Profile at external databases
- IJF: 13470
- JudoInside.com: 56737
- Updated on 11 December 2025

Tornike Tsjakadoea (born 5 October 1996) is a Dutch-Georgian retired judoka. He represented the Netherlands at the 2020 Summer Olympics in Tokyo, Japan and competed at the World Judo Championships in 2018, 2019, 2021, 2022 and 2024.

In 2020, Tsjakadoea won one of the bronze medals in the men's 60 kg event at the Judo Grand Slam Düsseldorf held in Düsseldorf, Germany. In the same year, he competed in the men's 60 kg event at the 2020 European Judo Championships held in Prague, Czech Republic.

In 2021, he won one of the bronze medals in his event at the Judo World Masters held in Doha, Qatar.

Tsjakadoea represented the Netherlands at the 2020 Summer Olympics in Tokyo, Japan. He lost his bronze medal match in the men's 60 kg event.

He lost his bronze medal match at the 2022 Judo Grand Slam Tel Aviv held in Tel Aviv, Israel.
