= Temur Nozadze =

Georgian judoka (born 1998)

Personal information
- Born: 23 January 1998 (age 28)
- Occupation: Judoka

Sport
- Country: Georgia
- Sport: Judo
- Weight class: ‍–‍60 kg

Achievements and titles
- European Champ.: R16 (2021)
Medal record
Men's judo
Representing Georgia
IJF Grand Slam
Gold medal – first place	2021 Tbilisi	‍–‍60 kg
Gold medal – first place	2022 Tbilisi	‍–‍60 kg
Silver medal – second place	2019 Baku	‍–‍60 kg
Silver medal – second place	2021 Tel Aviv	‍–‍60 kg
Silver medal – second place	2025 Tbilisi	‍–‍66 kg
Bronze medal – third place	2019 Paris	‍–‍60 kg
Bronze medal – third place	2022 Budapest	‍–‍60 kg
IJF Grand Prix
Bronze medal – third place	2018 Tbilisi	‍–‍60 kg
European U23 Championships
Silver medal – second place	2020 Poreč	‍–‍60 kg
Bronze medal – third place	2019 Izhevsk	‍–‍60 kg
European Cadet Championships
Silver medal – second place	2014 Athens	‍–‍50 kg

Profile at external databases
- IJF: 20509
- JudoInside.com: 43965
- Updated on 22 March 2025

Temur Nozadze (born 23 January 1998) is a Georgian judoka.

Nozadze is the gold medalist of the 2021 Judo Grand Slam Tbilisi in the ‍–‍60 kg category.
