= Romaric Bouda =

French judoka (born 1997)

Personal information
- Born: 14 June 1997 (age 29)
- Occupation: Judoka

Sport
- Country: France
- Sport: Judo
- Weight class: ‍–‍60 kg

Achievements and titles
- World Champ.: R32 (2021)
Medal record
Men's judo
Representing France
IJF Grand Slam
Bronze medal – third place	2021 Antalya	‍–‍60 kg
IJF Grand Prix
Bronze medal – third place	2018 The Hague	‍–‍60 kg
European Cadet Championships
Gold medal – first place	2014 Athens	‍–‍60 kg

Profile at external databases
- IJF: 22106
- JudoInside.com: 83060
- Updated on 21 November 2022

Romaric Bouda (born 14 June 1997) is a French judoka.

Bouda is a bronze medalist from the 2021 Judo Grand Slam Antalya in the ‍–‍60 kg category.
