= Yago Abuladze =

Russian judoka (born 1997)

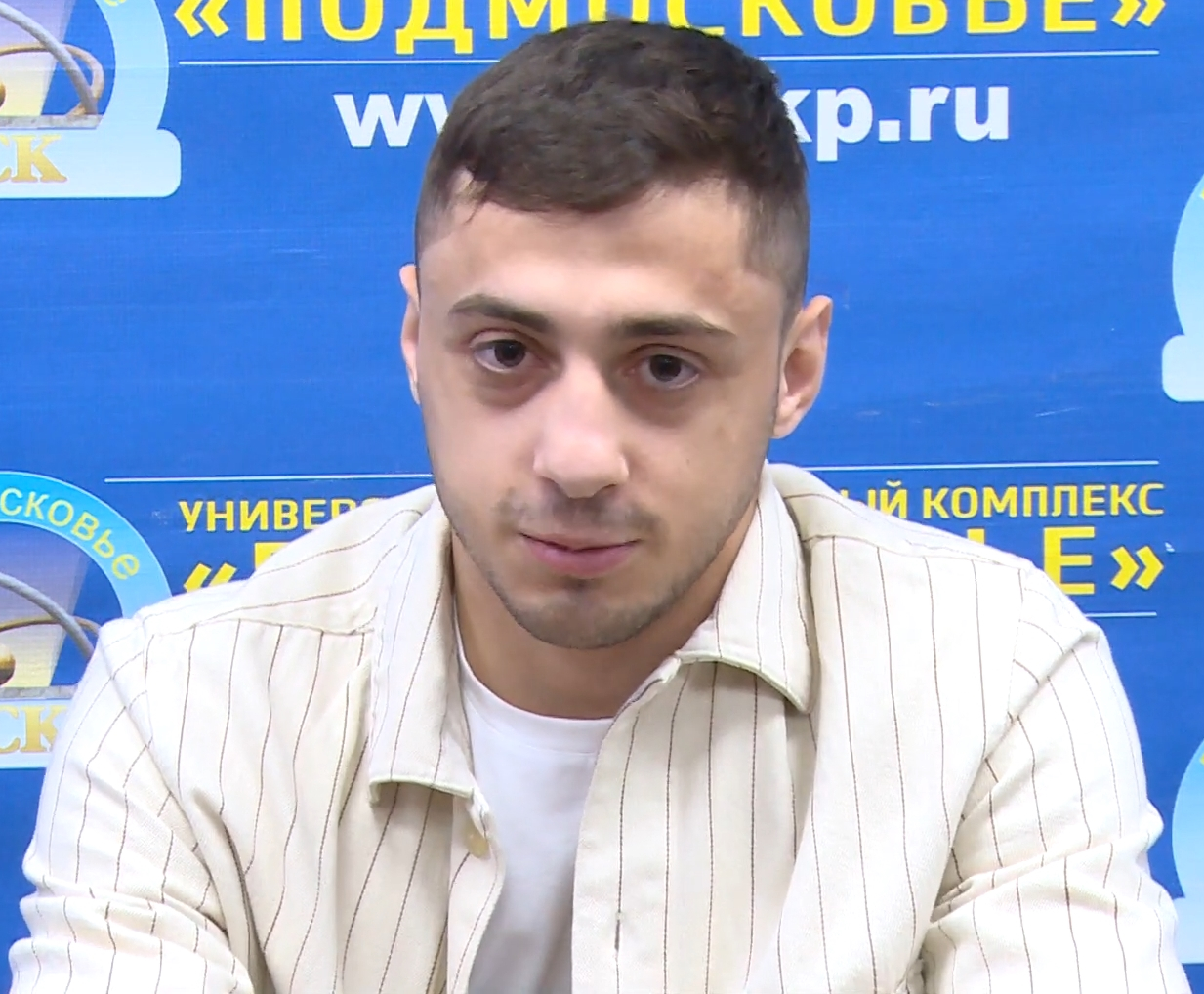
- Yago Abuladze in June 2021

Personal information
- Native name: Яго Джумберович Абуладзе
- Full name: Yago Dzhumberovich Abuladze
- Born: 16 October 1997 (age 29)
- Occupation: Judoka
- Height: 173 cm (5 ft 8 in)

Sport
- Country: Russia
- Sport: Judo
- Weight class: ‍–‍60 kg, ‍–‍66 kg

Achievements and titles
- World Champ.: (gold) (2021)
- European Champ.: (silver) (2020)
- Highest world ranking: 1
Medal record
Men's judo
Representing Individual Neutral Athletes
IJF Grand Prix
| Gold medal – first place | 2024 Odivelas | ‍–‍66 kg |
Representing the IJF
IJF Grand Slam
| Bronze medal – third place | 2022 Ulaanbaatar | ‍–‍66 kg |
Representing the Russian Judo Federation
World Championships
| Gold medal – first place | 2021 Budapest | ‍–‍60 kg |
Representing Russia
European Championships
| Silver medal – second place | 2020 Prague | ‍–‍60 kg |
| Bronze medal – third place | 2021 Lisbon | ‍–‍60 kg |
IJF Grand Slam
| Gold medal – first place | 2020 Budapest | ‍–‍60 kg |
| Silver medal – second place | 2018 Osaka | ‍–‍60 kg |
| Silver medal – second place | 2020 Paris | ‍–‍60 kg |
| Silver medal – second place | 2026 Abu Dhabi | ‍–‍66 kg |
| Bronze medal – third place | 2019 Baku | ‍–‍60 kg |
| Bronze medal – third place | 2019 Abu Dhabi | ‍–‍60 kg |
| Bronze medal – third place | 2026 Dushanbe | ‍–‍66 kg |
IJF Grand Prix
| Gold medal – first place | 2019 Tashkent | ‍–‍60 kg |
European U23 Championships
| Gold medal – first place | 2018 Győr | ‍–‍60 kg |
| Silver medal – second place | 2017 Podgorica | ‍–‍60 kg |

Profile at external databases
- IJF: 22412
- JudoInside.com: 44999
- Updated on 29 October 2026

Yago Dzhumberovich Abuladze (Russian: Яго Джумберович Абуладзе; born 16 October 1997) is a Russian judoka. He won the gold medal in the men's 60 kg event at the 2021 World Judo Championships held in Budapest, Hungary.

In 2020, Abuladze won the silver medal in the men's 60 kg event at the European Judo Championships held in Prague, Czech Republic.

In 2023, Abuladze showed support for the Russian invasion of Ukraine.

== Career ==
Abuladze won the silver medal in the men's 60 kg event at the 2017 European U23 Judo Championships held in Podgorica, Montenegro. In 2018, he won the gold medal in this event at the European U23 Judo Championships held in Győr, Hungary.

In 2020, Abuladze won the silver medal in his event at the Judo Grand Slam Paris in Paris, France and the gold medal in his event at the 2020 Judo Grand Slam Hungary in Budapest, Hungary.

In 2021, Abuladze competed in the men's 60 kg event at the Judo World Masters held in Doha, Qatar. A few months later, he won one of the bronze medals in the men's 60 kg event at the 2021 European Judo Championships held in Lisbon, Portugal.

== Achievements ==
| Year | Tournament | Place | Weight class |
|---|---|---|---|
| 2020 | European Championships | 2nd | −60 kg |
| 2021 | European Championships | 3rd | −60 kg |
| 2021 | World Championships | 1st | −60 kg |
