= 2019 Judo Grand Slam Abu Dhabi =

Judo competition

Judo 2019 Judo Grand Slam Abu Dhabi
- Venue: Mubadala Arena
- Location: Abu Dhabi, United Arab Emirates
- Dates: 24–26 October 2019
- Competitors: 551 from 95 nations

Competition at external databases
- Links: IJF • EJU • JudoInside

The 2019 Judo Grand Slam Abu Dhabi was held in Abu Dhabi, United Arab Emirates from 24 to 26 October 2019.

== Medal summary ==
=== Men's events ===
Event	Gold	Silver	Bronze
Extra-lightweight (−60 kg)	Gusman Kyrgyzbayev (KAZ)	Walide Khyar (FRA)	Yago Abuladze (RUS)
Extra-lightweight (−60 kg)	Gusman Kyrgyzbayev (KAZ)	Walide Khyar (FRA)	Diyorbek Urozboev (UZB)
Half-lightweight (−66 kg)	Manuel Lombardo (ITA)	Orkhan Safarov (AZE)	Orlando Polanco (CUB)
Half-lightweight (−66 kg)	Manuel Lombardo (ITA)	Orkhan Safarov (AZE)	An Ba-ul (KOR)
Lightweight (−73 kg)	Bilal Çiloğlu (TUR)	Arthur Margelidon (CAN)	Khikmatillokh Turaev (UZB)
Lightweight (−73 kg)	Bilal Çiloğlu (TUR)	Arthur Margelidon (CAN)	Igor Wandtke (GER)
Half-middleweight (−81 kg)	Lee Moon-jin (KOR)	Luka Maisuradze (GEO)	Vedat Albayrak (TUR)
Half-middleweight (−81 kg)	Lee Moon-jin (KOR)	Luka Maisuradze (GEO)	Dominic Ressel (GER)
Middleweight (−90 kg)	Nikoloz Sherazadishvili (ESP)	Gwak Dong-han (KOR)	Avtandili Tchrikishvili (GEO)
Middleweight (−90 kg)	Nikoloz Sherazadishvili (ESP)	Gwak Dong-han (KOR)	Eduard Trippel (GER)
Half-heavyweight (−100 kg)	Cho Gu-ham (KOR)	Zelym Kotsoiev (AZE)	Arman Adamian (RUS)
Half-heavyweight (−100 kg)	Cho Gu-ham (KOR)	Zelym Kotsoiev (AZE)	Shady El Nahas (CAN)
Heavyweight (+100 kg)	Roy Meyer (NED)	Iakiv Khammo (UKR)	Ushangi Kokauri (AZE)
Heavyweight (+100 kg)	Roy Meyer (NED)	Iakiv Khammo (UKR)	Kim Sung-min (KOR)

=== Women's events ===
Event	Gold	Silver	Bronze
Extra-lightweight (−48 kg)	Daria Bilodid (UKR)	Maruša Štangar (SLO)	Katharina Menz (GER)
Extra-lightweight (−48 kg)	Daria Bilodid (UKR)	Maruša Štangar (SLO)	Catarina Costa (POR)
Half-lightweight (−52 kg)	Majlinda Kelmendi (KOS)	Odette Giuffrida (ITA)	Park Da-sol (KOR)
Half-lightweight (−52 kg)	Majlinda Kelmendi (KOS)	Odette Giuffrida (ITA)	Chelsie Giles (GBR)
Lightweight (−57 kg)	Kim Jin-a (PRK)	Sarah-Léonie Cysique (FRA)	Diana Dzhigaros (RUS)
Lightweight (−57 kg)	Kim Jin-a (PRK)	Sarah-Léonie Cysique (FRA)	Kim Jan-di (KOR)
Half-middleweight (−63 kg)	Tina Trstenjak (SLO)	Maylín del Toro Carvajal (CUB)	Ketleyn Quadros (BRA)
Half-middleweight (−63 kg)	Tina Trstenjak (SLO)	Maylín del Toro Carvajal (CUB)	Yang Junxia (CHN)
Middleweight (−70 kg)	Kim Polling (NED)	Sanne van Dijke (NED)	Elvismar Rodríguez (VEN)
Middleweight (−70 kg)	Kim Polling (NED)	Sanne van Dijke (NED)	Michaela Polleres (AUT)
Half-heavyweight (−78 kg)	Klara Apotekar (SLO)	Luise Malzahn (GER)	Madeleine Malonga (FRA)
Half-heavyweight (−78 kg)	Klara Apotekar (SLO)	Luise Malzahn (GER)	Guusje Steenhuis (NED)
Heavyweight (+78 kg)	Han Mi-jin (KOR)	Anne Fatoumata M'Bairo (FRA)	Maria Suelen Altheman (BRA)
Heavyweight (+78 kg)	Han Mi-jin (KOR)	Anne Fatoumata M'Bairo (FRA)	Nihel Cheikh Rouhou (TUN)

Source Results

=== Medal table ===
* Host nation (United Arab Emirates)

Rank	Nation	Gold	Silver	Bronze	Total
1	South Korea (KOR)	3	1	4	8
2	Netherlands (NED)	2	1	1	4
3	Slovenia (SLO)	2	1	0	3
4	Italy (ITA)	1	1	0	2
4	Ukraine (UKR)	1	1	0	2
6	Turkey (TUR)	1	0	1	2
7	Kazakhstan (KAZ)	1	0	0	1
7	Kosovo (KOS)	1	0	0	1
7	North Korea (PRK)	1	0	0	1
7	Spain (ESP)	1	0	0	1
11	France (FRA)	0	3	1	4
12	Azerbaijan (AZE)	0	2	1	3
13	Germany (GER)	0	1	4	5
14	Canada (CAN)	0	1	1	2
14	Cuba (CUB)	0	1	1	2
14	Georgia (GEO)	0	1	1	2
17	Russia (RUS)	0	0	3	3
18	Brazil (BRA)	0	0	2	2
18	Uzbekistan (UZB)	0	0	2	2
20	Austria (AUT)	0	0	1	1
20	China (CHN)	0	0	1	1
20	Great Britain (GBR)	0	0	1	1
20	Portugal (POR)	0	0	1	1
20	Tunisia (TUN)	0	0	1	1
20	Venezuela (VEN)	0	0	1	1
Totals (25 entries)		14	14	28	56
