= 2016 European U23 Judo Championships =

Judo competition

Judo 2016 European U23 Judo Championships
- Venue: Drive in Arena
- Location: Tel Aviv, Israel
- Dates: 11–12 November 2016
- Competitors: 321 from 40 nations

Competition at external databases
- Links: IJF • EJU • JudoInside

The 2016 European U23 Judo Championships is an edition of the European U23 Judo Championships, organised by the European Judo Union. It was held in Tel Aviv, Israel from 11 to 12 November 2016.

== Medal summary ==
=== Medal table ===
* Host nation (Israel)

Rank	Nation	Gold	Silver	Bronze	Total
1	Russia (RUS)	2	3	5	10
2	Ukraine (UKR)	2	0	1	3
3	Georgia (GEO)	2	0	0	2
4	Hungary (HUN)	1	2	1	4
5	Germany (GER)	1	1	3	5
6	Great Britain (GBR)	1	1	1	3
7	Azerbaijan (AZE)	1	0	1	2
7	Croatia (CRO)	1	0	1	2
7	Kosovo (KOS)	1	0	1	2
7	Serbia (SRB)	1	0	1	2
11	Moldova (MDA)	1	0	0	1
12	Belarus (BLR)	0	2	1	3
12	Israel (ISR)*	0	2	1	3
14	Italy (ITA)	0	1	2	3
15	Romania (ROU)	0	1	1	2
16	Turkey (TUR)	0	1	0	1
17	Netherlands (NED)	0	0	4	4
18	Bosnia and Herzegovina (BIH)	0	0	1	1
18	Greece (GRE)	0	0	1	1
18	Spain (ESP)	0	0	1	1
18	Switzerland (SUI)	0	0	1	1
Totals (21 entries)		14	14	28	56

=== Men's events ===
Event	Gold	Silver	Bronze
Extra-lightweight (−60 kg)	Sakhavat Gadzhiev (RUS)	Csaba Szabó (HUN)	Marcel Bizon (GER)
Extra-lightweight (−60 kg)	Sakhavat Gadzhiev (RUS)	Csaba Szabó (HUN)	Tornike Tsjakadoea (NED)
Half-lightweight (−66 kg)	Denis Vieru (MDA)	Manuel Scheibel (GER)	Nils Stump (SUI)
Half-lightweight (−66 kg)	Denis Vieru (MDA)	Manuel Scheibel (GER)	Alexander Raskopine (ISR)
Lightweight (−73 kg)	Hidayat Heydarov (AZE)	Tohar Butbul (ISR)	Akil Gjakova (KOS)
Lightweight (−73 kg)	Hidayat Heydarov (AZE)	Tohar Butbul (ISR)	Andrea Gismondo (ITA)
Half-middleweight (−81 kg)	Koba Mchedlishvili (GEO)	Antonio Esposito (ITA)	Abas Azizov (RUS)
Half-middleweight (−81 kg)	Koba Mchedlishvili (GEO)	Antonio Esposito (ITA)	Jesper Smink (NED)
Middleweight (−90 kg)	Beka Gviniashvili (GEO)	Yahor Varapayeu (BLR)	Firudin Dadashov (AZE)
Middleweight (−90 kg)	Beka Gviniashvili (GEO)	Yahor Varapayeu (BLR)	Nemanja Majdov (SRB)
Half-heavyweight (−100 kg)	Niyaz Bilalov (RUS)	Mikita Sviryd (BLR)	Niyaz Ilyasov (RUS)
Half-heavyweight (−100 kg)	Niyaz Bilalov (RUS)	Mikita Sviryd (BLR)	Philipp Galandi (GER)
Heavyweight (+100 kg)	Iakiv Khammo (UKR)	Tamerlan Bashaev (RUS)	Uladzislau Tsiarpitski (BLR)
Heavyweight (+100 kg)	Iakiv Khammo (UKR)	Tamerlan Bashaev (RUS)	Jur Spijkers (NED)

=== Women's events ===
Event	Gold	Silver	Bronze
Extra-lightweight (−48 kg)	Milica Nikolić (SRB)	Réka Pupp (HUN)	Laura Martinez Abelenda (ESP)
Extra-lightweight (−48 kg)	Milica Nikolić (SRB)	Réka Pupp (HUN)	Alexandra Pop (ROU)
Half-lightweight (−52 kg)	Distria Krasniqi (KOS)	Alexandra-Larisa Florian (ROU)	Tihea Topolovec (CRO)
Half-lightweight (−52 kg)	Distria Krasniqi (KOS)	Alexandra-Larisa Florian (ROU)	Katinka Szabó (HUN)
Lightweight (−57 kg)	Theresa Stoll (GER)	Adi Grossman (ISR)	Daria Mezhetskaia (RUS)
Lightweight (−57 kg)	Theresa Stoll (GER)	Adi Grossman (ISR)	Natalia Golomidova (RUS)
Half-middleweight (−63 kg)	Lucy Renshall (GBR)	Kamila Badurova (RUS)	Diana Dzhigaros (RUS)
Half-middleweight (−63 kg)	Lucy Renshall (GBR)	Kamila Badurova (RUS)	Lea Reimann (GER)
Middleweight (−70 kg)	Szabina Gercsák (HUN)	Jemima Yeats-Brown (GBR)	Aleksandra Samardzic (BIH)
Middleweight (−70 kg)	Szabina Gercsák (HUN)	Jemima Yeats-Brown (GBR)	Elisavet Teltsidou (GRE)
Half-heavyweight (−78 kg)	Anastasiya Turchyn (UKR)	Antonina Shmeleva (RUS)	Giorgia Stangherlin (ITA)
Half-heavyweight (−78 kg)	Anastasiya Turchyn (UKR)	Antonina Shmeleva (RUS)	Larissa Groenwold (NED)
Heavyweight (+78 kg)	Ivana Šutalo (CRO)	Sebile Akbulut (TUR)	Yelyzaveta Kalanina (UKR)
Heavyweight (+78 kg)	Ivana Šutalo (CRO)	Sebile Akbulut (TUR)	Jodie Myers (GBR)

Source Results
