= 2021 Judo Grand Slam Tbilisi =

Judo competition

Judo 2021 Judo Grand Slam Tbilisi
- Venue: Tbilisi Sports Palace
- Location: (Georgia (country)) Tbilisi, Georgia
- Dates: 26–28 March 2021
- Competitors: 441 from 80 nations

Competition at external databases
- Links: IJF • EJU • JudoInside

The 2021 Judo Grand Slam Tbilisi was held at the Tbilisi Sports Palace in Tbilisi, Georgia from 26 to 28 March 2021.

== Medal summary ==
=== Medal table ===
* Host nation (Georgia)

Rank	Nation	Gold	Silver	Bronze	Total
1	Georgia (GEO)*	2	3	4	9
2	Canada (CAN)	2	1	1	4
3	Mongolia (MGL)	2	0	2	4
4	Italy (ITA)	1	2	0	3
5	Uzbekistan (UZB)	1	1	3	5
6	Brazil (BRA)	1	1	2	4
7	China (CHN)	1	1	1	3
7	Netherlands (NED)	1	1	1	3
9	Belgium (BEL)	1	0	2	3
10	Kosovo (KOS)	1	0	0	1
10	Sweden (SWE)	1	0	0	1
12	Russia (RUS)	0	1	3	4
13	Portugal (POR)	0	1	1	2
14	Austria (AUT)	0	1	0	1
14	Great Britain (GBR)	0	1	0	1
16	Azerbaijan (AZE)	0	0	2	2
17	Cuba (CUB)	0	0	1	1
17	Hungary (HUN)	0	0	1	1
17	Israel (ISR)	0	0	1	1
17	Slovenia (SLO)	0	0	1	1
17	Spain (ESP)	0	0	1	1
17	Tajikistan (TJK)	0	0	1	1
Totals (22 entries)		14	14	28	56

=== Men's events ===
Event	Gold	Silver	Bronze
Extra-lightweight (−60 kg)	Temur Nozadze (GEO)	Kemran Nurillaev (UZB)	Karamat Huseynov (AZE)
Extra-lightweight (−60 kg)	Temur Nozadze (GEO)	Kemran Nurillaev (UZB)	Shahboz Saidaburorov (TJK)
Half-lightweight (−66 kg)	Sardor Nurillaev (UZB)	Vazha Margvelashvili (GEO)	Ganboldyn Kherlen (MGL)
Half-lightweight (−66 kg)	Sardor Nurillaev (UZB)	Vazha Margvelashvili (GEO)	Mikhail Pulyaev (RUS)
Lightweight (−73 kg)	Tsend-Ochiryn Tsogtbaatar (MGL)	Arthur Margelidon (CAN)	Aleko Mamiashvili (GEO)
Lightweight (−73 kg)	Tsend-Ochiryn Tsogtbaatar (MGL)	Arthur Margelidon (CAN)	Lasha Shavdatuashvili (GEO)
Half-middleweight (−81 kg)	Sami Chouchi (BEL)	Shamil Borchashvili (AUT)	Murad Fatiyev (AZE)
Half-middleweight (−81 kg)	Sami Chouchi (BEL)	Shamil Borchashvili (AUT)	Tato Grigalashvili (GEO)
Middleweight (−90 kg)	Marcus Nyman (SWE)	Nicholas Mungai (ITA)	Davlat Bobonov (UZB)
Middleweight (−90 kg)	Marcus Nyman (SWE)	Nicholas Mungai (ITA)	Gantulgyn Altanbagana (MGL)
Half-heavyweight (−100 kg)	Shady El Nahas (CAN)	Ilia Sulamanidze (GEO)	Toma Nikiforov (BEL)
Half-heavyweight (−100 kg)	Shady El Nahas (CAN)	Ilia Sulamanidze (GEO)	Muzaffarbek Turoboyev (UZB)
Heavyweight (+100 kg)	Gela Zaalishvili (GEO)	Rafael Silva (BRA)	Andy Granda (CUB)
Heavyweight (+100 kg)	Gela Zaalishvili (GEO)	Rafael Silva (BRA)	Saba Inaneishvili (GEO)

Source Results

=== Women's events ===
Event	Gold	Silver	Bronze
Extra-lightweight (−48 kg)	Mönkhbatyn Urantsetseg (MGL)	Francesca Milani (ITA)	Julia Figueroa (ESP)
Extra-lightweight (−48 kg)	Mönkhbatyn Urantsetseg (MGL)	Francesca Milani (ITA)	Maruša Štangar (SLO)
Half-lightweight (−52 kg)	Odette Giuffrida (ITA)	Chelsie Giles (GBR)	Réka Pupp (HUN)
Half-lightweight (−52 kg)	Odette Giuffrida (ITA)	Chelsie Giles (GBR)	Joana Ramos (POR)
Lightweight (−57 kg)	Nora Gjakova (KOS)	Eteri Liparteliani (GEO)	Christa Deguchi (CAN)
Lightweight (−57 kg)	Nora Gjakova (KOS)	Eteri Liparteliani (GEO)	Daria Kurbonmamadova (RUS)
Half-middleweight (−63 kg)	Catherine Beauchemin-Pinard (CAN)	Yang Junxia (CHN)	Daria Davydova (RUS)
Half-middleweight (−63 kg)	Catherine Beauchemin-Pinard (CAN)	Yang Junxia (CHN)	Geke van den Berg (NED)
Middleweight (−70 kg)	Maria Portela (BRA)	Madina Taimazova (RUS)	Gulnoza Matniyazova (UZB)
Middleweight (−70 kg)	Maria Portela (BRA)	Madina Taimazova (RUS)	Gabriella Willems (BEL)
Half-heavyweight (−78 kg)	Natascha Ausma (NED)	Karen Stevenson (NED)	Inbar Lanir (ISR)
Half-heavyweight (−78 kg)	Natascha Ausma (NED)	Karen Stevenson (NED)	Ma Zhenzhao (CHN)
Heavyweight (+78 kg)	Xu Shiyan (CHN)	Rochele Nunes (POR)	Maria Suelen Altheman (BRA)
Heavyweight (+78 kg)	Xu Shiyan (CHN)	Rochele Nunes (POR)	Beatriz Souza (BRA)

Source Results

== Event videos ==
The event was aired freely on the IJF YouTube channel.

	Weight classes	Preliminaries			Final Block
Day 1	Men: -60, -66 Women: -48, -52, -57	Commentated			
Day 1	Men: -60, -66 Women: -48, -52, -57	Tatami 1	Tatami 2	Tatami 3	
Day 2	Men: -73, -81 Women: -63, -70	Commentated			
Day 2	Men: -73, -81 Women: -63, -70	Tatami 1	Tatami 2	Tatami 3	
Day 3	Men: -90, -100, +100 Women: -78, +78	Commentated			
Day 3	Men: -90, -100, +100 Women: -78, +78	Tatami 1	Tatami 2	Tatami 3	
