= Judo at the 2015 Pan American Games – Men's 60 kg =

Men's 60 kg at the 2015 Pan American Games
- Venue: Mississauga Sports Centre
- Dates: July 11
- Competitors: 10 from 10 nations

Medalists
| Gold medal | Lenin Preciado | Ecuador |
| Silver medal | Felipe Kitadai | Brazil |
| Bronze medal | John Futtinico | Colombia |
| Bronze medal | Yandry Torres Marimon | Cuba |

The men's 60 kg competition of the judo events at the 2015 Pan American Games in Toronto, Canada, was held on July 11 at the Mississauga Sports Centre.

== Schedule ==
All times are Central Standard Time (UTC-6).

| Date | Time | Round |
|---|---|---|
| July 11, 2015 | 15:37 | Preliminary bout |
| July 11, 2015 | 15:37 | Quarterfinals |
| July 11, 2015 | 16:26 | Repechage |
| July 11, 2015 | 17:08 | Semifinals |
| July 11, 2015 | 20:21 | Bronze medal matches |
| July 11, 2015 | 20:35 | Final |

== Results ==
Legend

- 1st number = Ippon
- 2nd number = Waza-ari
- 3rd number = Yuko

=== Bracket ===
Preliminaries
Luis Alberto Damas (MEX) | 000S1
John Futtinico (COL) | 100
Sergio Pessoa (CAN) | 101S2
Abel Montero (DOM) | 000S1

Quarter Finals
Felipe Kitadai (BRA) | 010S1
John Futtinico (COL) | 000S2
Herman Birbrier (ARG) | 000
Yandry Torres Marimon (CUB) | 100
Lenin Preciado (ECU) | 100
Javier Guédez (VEN) | 001S2
Juan Postigos (PER) | 000S1
Sergio Pessoa (CAN) | 000S2

Semi Finals
Felipe Kitadai (BRA) | 000S1
Yandry Torres Marimon (CUB) | 000S3
Lenin Preciado (ECU) | 100
Juan Postigos (PER) | 000

Final
Felipe Kitadai (BRA) | 000
Lenin Preciado (ECU) | 100

=== Repechage round ===
Two bronze medals were awarded.

| Repechage | | Bronze medal |
| John Futtinico (COL) | 100 |
| Herman Birbrier (ARG) | 000S1 | John Futtinico (COL) | 100 |
| | | Juan Postigos (PER) | 000 |

| Repechage | | Bronze medal |
| Javier Guédez (VEN) | 000S1 |
| Sergio Pessoa (CAN) | 010S1 | Sergio Pessoa (CAN) | 010S2 |
| | | Yandry Torres Marimon (CUB) | 100 |
