= Lenin Preciado =

Ecuadorian judoka (born 1993)

Personal information
- Born: 23 August 1993 (age 32) Machala, Ecuador
- Occupation: Judoka

Sport
- Country: Ecuador
- Sport: Judo
- Weight class: ‍–‍60 kg, ‍–‍66 kg

Achievements and titles
- Olympic Games: R32 (2016, 2020)
- World Champ.: R16 (2018, 2021)
- Pan American Champ.: (2018, 2019, 2021)
Medal record
Men's judo
Representing Ecuador
Pan American Games
Gold medal – first place	2015 Toronto	‍–‍60 kg
Silver medal – second place	2019 Lima	‍–‍60 kg
Pan American Championships
Gold medal – first place	2018 San José	‍–‍60 kg
Gold medal – first place	2019 Lima	‍–‍60 kg
Gold medal – first place	2021 Guadalajara	‍–‍60 kg
Silver medal – second place	2017 Panama City	‍–‍60 kg
Bronze medal – third place	2014 Guayaquil	‍–‍60 kg
Bronze medal – third place	2015 Edmonton	‍–‍60 kg
Bronze medal – third place	2020 Guadalajara	‍–‍60 kg
Bronze medal – third place	2024 Rio de Janeiro	‍–‍66 kg
Bronze medal – third place	2025 Santiago	‍–‍66 kg
IJF Grand Prix
Bronze medal – third place	2018 Cancún	‍–‍60 kg
Pan American Junior Championships
Gold medal – first place	2013 Buenos Aires	‍–‍60 kg
South American Junior Championships
Gold medal – first place	2013 Buenos Aires	‍–‍60 kg

Profile at external databases
- IJF: 10992
- JudoInside.com: 69618
- Updated on 29 April 2025

Lenin Preciado (born 23 August 1993) is an Ecuadorian judoka. He won a gold medal in men's 60 kg at the 2015 Pan American Games.

Preciado competed at the 2016 Summer Olympics in Rio de Janeiro, in the men's 60 kg.

Preciado represented Ecuador at the 2020 Summer Olympics.
