= Robert Mshvidobadze =

Russian judoka (born 1989)

Personal information
- Native name: Роберт Николаевич Мшвидобадзе
- Full name: Robert Nikolaevich Mshvidobadze
- Born: 17 August 1989 (age 36) Gori, Georgian SSR, USSR
- Occupation: Judoka

Sport
- Country: Russia
- Sport: Judo
- Weight class: ‍–‍60 kg
- Rank: Master of Sport in Judo
- Club: Dynamo, Orenburg
- Coached by: Sergei Kosmynin

Achievements and titles
- Olympic Games: R16 (2020)
- World Champ.: (silver) (2018)
- European Champ.: (gold) (2017, 2020)
Medal record
Men's judo
Representing Russia
World Championships
Silver medal – second place	2018 Baku	‍–‍60 kg
European Championships
Gold medal – first place	2017 Warsaw	‍–‍60 kg
Gold medal – first place	2020 Prague	‍–‍60 kg
World Masters
Gold medal – first place	2018 Guangzhou	‍–‍60 kg
Bronze medal – third place	2019 Qingdao	‍–‍60 kg
IJF Grand Slam
Gold medal – first place	2017 Abu Dhabi	‍–‍60 kg
Silver medal – second place	2018 Düsseldorf	‍–‍60 kg
Silver medal – second place	2019 Düsseldorf	‍–‍60 kg
Silver medal – second place	2020 Budapest	‍–‍60 kg
Silver medal – second place	2021 Kazan	‍–‍60 kg
Bronze medal – third place	2013 Baku	‍–‍60 kg
Bronze medal – third place	2016 Tokyo	‍–‍60 kg
IJF Grand Prix
Silver medal – second place	2016 Zagreb	‍–‍60 kg
Silver medal – second place	2017 Zagreb	‍–‍60 kg
Silver medal – second place	2019 Montreal	‍–‍60 kg
Bronze medal – third place	2012 Qingdao	‍–‍60 kg
Bronze medal – third place	2013 Samsun	‍–‍60 kg
Bronze medal – third place	2014 Samsun	‍–‍60 kg
Bronze medal – third place	2014 Qingdao	‍–‍60 kg
Bronze medal – third place	2017 Hohhot	‍–‍60 kg
Bronze medal – third place	2018 Budapest	‍–‍60 kg
European U23 Championships
Silver medal – second place	2009 Antalya	‍–‍60 kg
Silver medal – second place	2010 Sarajevo	‍–‍60 kg
Silver medal – second place	2011 Tyumen	‍–‍60 kg
European Cadet Championships
Silver medal – second place	2004 Rotterdam	‍–‍50 kg
Bronze medal – third place	2005 Salzburg	‍–‍55 kg
Summer Universiade
Bronze medal – third place	2011 Shenzhen	‍–‍60 kg

Profile at external databases
- IJF: 2757
- JudoInside.com: 33745
- Updated on 23 May 2023

Robert Nikolaevich Mshvidobadze (Russian: Роберт Николаевич Мшвидобадзе; born 17 August 1989 in Georgia) is a Russian judoka of Georgian descent. He is the 2017 European gold medalist in the ‍–‍60 kg division.

Mshvidobadze participated at the 2018 World Judo Championships, winning a medal in the ‍–‍60 kg category.
