= Jorre Verstraeten =

Belgian judoka (born 1997)

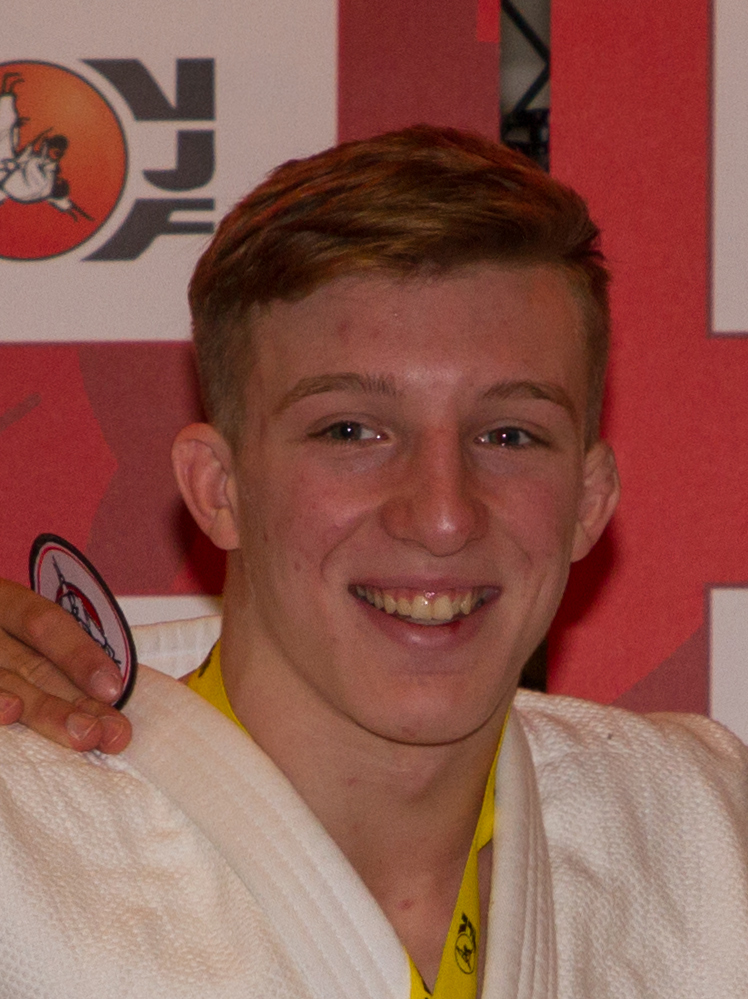
- Verstraeten in 2016

Personal information
- Born: 4 December 1997 (age 28)
- Occupation: Judoka
- Height: 160 cm (5 ft 3 in)

Sport
- Country: Belgium
- Sport: Judo
- Weight class: –60 kg

Achievements and titles
- Olympic Games: R16 (2020, 2024)
- World Champ.: 5th (2023)
- European Champ.: (bronze) (2019, 2020, 2022)
Medal record
Men's judo
Representing Belgium
European Games
Bronze medal – third place	2019 Minsk	‍–‍60 kg
European Championships
Bronze medal – third place	2020 Prague	‍–‍60 kg
Bronze medal – third place	2022 Sofia	‍–‍60 kg
IJF Grand Slam
Gold medal – first place	2021 Antalya	‍–‍60 kg
Gold medal – first place	2022 Budapest	‍–‍60 kg
Bronze medal – third place	2023 Tel Aviv	‍–‍60 kg
Bronze medal – third place	2023 Antalya	‍–‍60 kg
Bronze medal – third place	2025 Baku	‍–‍60 kg
IJF Grand Prix
Gold medal – first place	2019 Tel Aviv	‍–‍60 kg
Bronze medal – third place	2017 Cancún	‍–‍60 kg
Bronze medal – third place	2025 Lima	‍–‍60 kg
Bronze medal – third place	2025 Guadalajara	‍–‍60 kg
European Junior Championships
Silver medal – second place	2017 Maribor	‍–‍60 kg
Summer Youth Olympics
Bronze medal – third place	2014 Nanjing	‍–‍55 kg
World Cadets Championships
Bronze medal – third place	2013 Miami	‍–‍50 kg

Profile at external databases
- IJF: 13036
- JudoInside.com: 73219
- Updated on 19 October 2025

Jorre Verstraeten (born 4 December 1997) is a Belgian judoka. He won one of the bronze medals in the men's 60 kg event at the European Judo Championships in 2020 and 2022. He also won one of the bronze medals in the men's 60 kg event at the 2019 European Games held in Minsk, Belarus.

== Career ==
Verstraeten won one of the bronze medals in the boys' 55 kg event at the 2014 Summer Youth Olympics held in Nanjing, China. In his bronze medal match he defeated Gavin Mogopa of Botswana. He also competed in the mixed team event.

In 2017, Verstraeten competed in the men's 60 kg event at the European Judo Championships held in Warsaw, Poland. A few months later, he won one of the bronze medals in the men's 60 kg event at the Judo Grand Prix Cancún held in Cancún, Mexico. In 2018, Verstraeten was eliminated by Eric Takabatake of Brazil in his second match in the men's 60 kg event at the World Judo Championships held in Baku, Azerbaijan.

He won one of the bronze medals in the men's 60 kg event at the 2020 European Judo Championships held in Prague, Czech Republic.

In 2021, Verstraeten competed in the men's 60 kg event at the Judo World Masters held in Doha, Qatar. A few months later, he won the gold medal in his event at the Judo Grand Slam Antalya held in Antalya, Turkey.

Verstraeten represented Belgium at the 2020 Summer Olympics in Tokyo, Japan. He competed in the men's 60 kg event where he was eliminated in his second match by Naohisa Takato of Japan.

He won the gold medal in his event at the 2022 Judo Grand Slam Budapest held in Budapest, Hungary.

He lost his bronze medal match in the men's 60 kg event at the 2023 World Judo Championships held in Doha, Qatar.

== Career achievements ==
=== Major results ===
2019
(bronze) European Championships –60 kg, Minsk
2020
(bronze) European Championships –60 kg, Prague
2021
(gold) 2021 Judo Grand Slam Antalya –60 kg
2022
(bronze) European Championships –60 kg, Sofia
