= Ali Khousrof =

Yemeni judoka (born 1992)

Personal information
- Born: 5 March 1992 (age 33)
- Occupation: Judoka

Sport
- Sport: Judo

Profile at external databases
- JudoInside.com: 43536

Ali Khousrof (born 1992 in Sana'a) is a Yemeni judoka who competes in the men's 60 kg category. He competed in the 2008 Summer Olympics. In 2011, he was shot in the abdomen while participating in the 2011 Yemeni uprising. At the 2012 Summer Olympics, he was defeated in the second round by Yann Siccardi.

He qualified for six World Championships from 2007 to 2019. He won a gold medal at the 2011 Arab Games.
