= Mihraç Akkuş =

Turkish judoka (born 2000)

Personal information
- Born: 1 June 2000 (age 26)
- Occupation: Judoka

Sport
- Country: Turkey
- Sport: Judo
- Weight class: ‍–‍60 kg

Achievements and titles
- Olympic Games: R16 (2020)
- World Champ.: R32 (2021)
- European Champ.: R16 (2019, 2020, 2021)
Medal record
Men's judo
Representing Turkey
IJF Grand Prix
| Silver medal – second place | 2020 Tel Aviv | ‍–‍60 kg |
| Bronze medal – third place | 2019 Antalya | ‍–‍60 kg |
European U23 Championships
| Bronze medal – third place | 2021 Budapest | ‍–‍60 kg |
European Junior Championships
| Bronze medal – third place | 2018 Sofia | ‍–‍60 kg |
World Cadets Championships
| Gold medal – first place | 2017 Santiago | ‍–‍55 kg |
European Cadet Championships
| Gold medal – first place | 2017 Kaunas | ‍–‍55 kg |

Profile at external databases
- IJF: 20904
- JudoInside.com: 95569
- Updated on 21 May 2023

Mihraç Akkuş (born 1 June 2000) is a Turkish judoka.

Akkuş was the silver medalist at the 2020 Judo Grand Prix Tel Aviv and represented Turkey at the 2020 Summer Olympics.
