= Issam Bassou =

Moroccan judoka (born 1998)

Personal information
- Born: 10 October 1998 (age 27)
- Occupation: Judoka

Sport
- Country: Morocco
- Sport: Judo
- Weight class: ‍–‍60 kg

Achievements and titles
- World Champ.: R16 (2021)
- African Champ.: (gold) (2018, 2021)
Medal record
Men's judo
Representing Morocco
African Games
Gold medal – first place	2019 Rabat	‍–‍60 kg
African Championships
Gold medal – first place	2018 Tunis	‍–‍60 kg
Gold medal – first place	2021 Dakar	‍–‍60 kg
Silver medal – second place	2020 Antananarivo	‍–‍60 kg
IJF Grand Prix
Bronze medal – third place	2018 Agadir	‍–‍60 kg
African Junior Championships
Gold medal – first place	2015 Sharm El Sheikh	‍–‍55 kg
Bronze medal – third place	2017 Cairo	‍–‍60 kg
Mediterranean Games
Bronze medal – third place	2022 Oran	‍–‍60 kg

Profile at external databases
- IJF: 13038
- JudoInside.com: 57442
- Updated on 5 December 2022

Issam Bassou (born 10 October 1998) is a Moroccan judoka. He won gold medals at the 2019 African Games and the 2018 African Judo Championships in the men's ‍–‍60 kg category. His brother Imad Bassou is also a judoka.

In 2020, Bassou won the silver medal in the men's 60 kg event at the 2020 African Judo Championships held in Antananarivo, Madagascar.

At the 2021 African Judo Championships held in Dakar, Senegal, Bassou won the gold medal in the men's 60 kg event.

Bassou won one of the bronze medals in the men's 60 kg event at the 2022 Mediterranean Games held in Oran, Algeria.
