= Karamat Huseynov =

Azerbaijani judoka (born 1998)

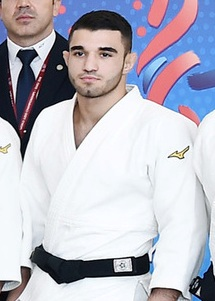

Personal information
- Born: 30 August 1998 (age 27)
- Occupation: Judoka

Sport
- Country: Azerbaijan
- Sport: Judo
- Weight class: ‍–‍60 kg

Achievements and titles
- Olympic Games: R16 (2020)
- World Champ.: (bronze) (2021)
- European Champ.: (bronze) (2021)
Medal record
Men's judo
Representing Azerbaijan
World Championships
Bronze medal – third place	2021 Budapest	‍–‍60 kg
European Championships
Bronze medal – third place	2021 Lisbon	‍–‍60 kg
IJF Grand Slam
Bronze medal – third place	2021 Tbilisi	‍–‍60 kg
Bronze medal – third place	2022 Baku	‍–‍60 kg
European U23 Championships
Bronze medal – third place	2017 Podgorica	‍–‍60 kg
World Juniors Championships
Silver medal – second place	2017 Zagreb	‍–‍60 kg
European Junior Championships
Gold medal – first place	2017 Maribor	‍–‍60 kg

Profile at external databases
- IJF: 20754
- JudoInside.com: 62602
- Updated on 22 May 2023

Karamat Huseynov (Azerbaijani: Kəramət Hüseynov, born 30 August 1998) is an Azerbaijani judoka, who competes in the ‍–‍60 kg division. Member of the Azerbaijani national judo team, bronze medalist of the 2021 World Championships and the 2021 European Championships.

In 2021, Huseynov won one of the bronze medals in the men's 60 kg event at the 2021 European Judo Championships held in Lisbon, Portugal.

== Biography ==
Karamat Huseynov was born on August 30, 1998, in Baku. Seeing the 9-year-old Karamat's interest in judo, his uncle (sister's brother) Olympic champion judoist Elnur Mammadli advised in 2007 to enroll the boy in this sport. Thus, Karamat Huseynov became a member of the Attila sports club. His first coach was Emin Fatullaev, under whom Karamat Huseynov subsequently trained.

== Career ==
In 2008, Karamat Huseynov becomes the champion of Baku among youths, and already at the age of 16 he wins the championship of Azerbaijan. In 2014, he wins a gold medal at the European Youth Cup in the Portuguese city of Coimbra, and takes bronze at a similar tournament in Bielsko-Biala, Poland.

Karamat Huseynov won a silver medal at the 2015 European Youth Olympic Festival in Tbilisi. In 2017, he won a silver medal at the World Junior Championships in Zagreb. In the same year, Huseynov became the European champion among juniors in 2017 in Maribor and the bronze medalist of the European Championship among judokas under 23 in Podgorica.

In 2018 in Saarbrücken Karamat Huseynov won a bronze medal. In 2018, he won the silver medal at the European Cup in Orenburg. At the 2018 World Championships in Baku, Huseynov took fifth place in the weight category up to 60 kg. Here he sensationally defeated the reigning Olympic champion Beslan Mudranov, but lost to future world champion Naohisa Takato from Japan in the quarterfinals. In the fight for bronze he lost to Amiran Papinashvili from Georgia.

At the Grand Slam tournament in Tbilisi in 2021, Huseynov won a bronze medal. In the same year, Huseynov won a bronze medal at the European Championships in Lisbon. In June 2021, at the World Championships, which took place in the capital of Hungary, in Budapest, an Azerbaijani athlete won a bronze medal in the up to 60 kg weight category, defeating Magzhan Shamshadin, an athlete from Kazakhstan, in a fight for 3rd place.
