= Moritz Plafky =

German judoka (born 1996)

Personal information
- Born: 10 April 1996 (age 30) Siegburg, Germany
- Occupation: Judoka

Sport
- Country: Germany
- Sport: Judo
- Weight class: ‍–‍60 kg

Achievements and titles
- Olympic Games: R32 (2020)
- World Champ.: R16 (2017, 2018, 2021)
- European Champ.: 5th (2019)
Medal record
Men's judo
Representing Germany
IJF Grand Prix
Bronze medal – third place	2018 Tashkent	‍–‍60 kg
European Cadet Championships
Silver medal – second place	2012 Bar	‍–‍50 kg

Profile at external databases
- IJF: 13393
- JudoInside.com: 63512
- Updated on 30 November 2022

Moritz Plafky (born 10 April 1996 in Siegburg) is a German judoka.

Plafky was one of the bronze medalist at the 2018 Judo Grand Prix Tashkent and represented Germany at the 2020 Summer Olympics.
