= Gusman Kyrgyzbayev =

Kazakhstani judoka (born 1992)

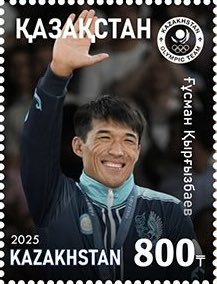
- Kyrgyzbayev at the 2024 Olympics

Personal information
- Native name: Ғұсман Қырғызбаев
- Born: 28 September 1992 (age 34) Almaty, Kazakhstan
- Occupation: Judoka

Sport
- Country: Kazakhstan
- Sport: Judo
- Weight class: ‍–‍60 kg, ‍–‍66 kg
- Coached by: E. Nasiyev

Achievements and titles
- Olympic Games: (bronze) (2024)
- World Champ.: (silver) (2021)
- Asian Champ.: (bronze) (2019, 2022)
Medal record
Men's judo
Representing Kazakhstan
Olympic Games
Bronze medal – third place	2024 Paris	‍–‍66 kg
World Championships
Silver medal – second place	2021 Budapest	‍–‍60 kg
Asian Games
Silver medal – second place	2026 Aichi‑Nagoya	Mixed team
Asian Championships
Bronze medal – third place	2019 Fujairah	‍–‍60 kg
Bronze medal – third place	2022 Nur‑Sultan	‍–‍66 kg
IJF Grand Slam
Gold medal – first place	2019 Abu Dhabi	‍–‍60 kg
Silver medal – second place	2023 Astana	‍–‍66 kg
Silver medal – second place	2025 Astana	‍–‍66 kg
Bronze medal – third place	2018 Abu Dhabi	‍–‍60 kg
Bronze medal – third place	2021 Tel Aviv	‍–‍60 kg
IJF Grand Prix
Gold medal – first place	2017 Antalya	‍–‍60 kg
Gold medal – first place	2018 Agadir	‍–‍60 kg
Silver medal – second place	2018 Hohhot	‍–‍60 kg
Silver medal – second place	2026 Qingdao	‍–‍66 kg
Bronze medal – third place	2018 Tunis	‍–‍60 kg

Profile at external databases
- IJF: 16451
- JudoInside.com: 92258
- Updated on 26 June 2026

Gusman Daniyaruly Kyrgyzbayev (Kazakh: Ғұсман Даниярұлы Қырғызбаев; born 28 September 1992) is a Kazakh judoka. As of the end of March 2018, he is currently ranked 7th in the world in under 60 kg division. He finished 7th at the 2017 world championships.
