= Eric Takabatake =

Brazilian judoka (born 1991)

Personal information
- Born: 9 January 1991 (age 35) São Bernardo do Campo, São Paulo
- Occupation: Judoka

Sport
- Country: Brazil
- Sport: Judo
- Weight class: ‍–‍60 kg

Achievements and titles
- Olympic Games: R16 (2020)
- World Champ.: 7th (2018)
- Pan American Champ.: (2017, 2020, 2022)
Medal record
Men's judo
Representing Brazil
World Championships
Bronze medal – third place	2021 Budapest	Mixed team
Pan American Championships
Gold medal – first place	2017 Panama City	‍–‍60 kg
Gold medal – first place	2020 Guadalajara	‍–‍60 kg
Gold medal – first place	2022 Lima	‍–‍66 kg
Silver medal – second place	2015 Edmonton	‍–‍60 kg
Silver medal – second place	2019 Lima	‍–‍60 kg
Bronze medal – third place	2016 Havana	‍–‍60 kg
IJF Grand Slam
Silver medal – second place	2016 Abu Dhabi	‍–‍60 kg
Silver medal – second place	2019 Brasilia	‍–‍60 kg
Bronze medal – third place	2018 Düsseldorf	‍–‍60 kg
IJF Grand Prix
Gold medal – first place	2016 Havana	‍–‍60 kg
Silver medal – second place	2013 Miami	‍–‍60 kg
Silver medal – second place	2014 Havana	‍–‍60 kg
Silver medal – second place	2014 Ulaanbaatar	‍–‍60 kg
Bronze medal – third place	2015 Jeju	‍–‍60 kg
Military World Games
Silver medal – second place	2019 Wuhan	Men's team

Profile at external databases
- IJF: 10874
- JudoInside.com: 76971
- Updated on 3 July 2022

Eric Takabatake (born 9 January 1991) is a Brazilian judoka. He is a two-time gold medalist in the men's 60 kg event conducted at the Pan American Judo Championships.

Takabatake competed in the men's 60 kg event at the 2014 World Judo Championships held in Chelyabinsk, Russia. However, he was eliminated in the third match by Beslan Mudranov of Russia.

In 2020, Takabatake won the gold medal in the men's 60 kg event at the Pan American Judo Championships held in Guadalajara, Mexico.

In 2021, Takabatake competed in the men's 60 kg event at the Judo World Masters held in Doha, Qatar. In June 2021, he won one of the bronze medals in the mixed team event at the 2021 World Judo Championships held in Budapest, Hungary.

Takabatake also represented Brazil at the 2020 Summer Olympics in Tokyo, Japan. He was eliminated in his second match in the men's 60 kg event.
