= Francisco Garrigós =

Spanish judoka (born 1994)

Personal information
- Full name: Francisco Garrigós Rosa
- Born: 9 December 1994 (age 31) Móstoles, Spain
- Occupation: Judoka
- Height: 163 cm (5 ft 4 in)
- Website: www.frangarrigos.com

Sport
- Country: Spain
- Sport: Judo
- Weight class: ‍–‍60 kg

Achievements and titles
- Olympic Games: (bronze) (2024)
- World Champ.: (2023)
- European Champ.: (gold) (2021, 2022, 2024)
Medal record
Men's judo
Representing Spain
Olympic Games
Bronze medal – third place	2024 Paris	‍–‍60 kg
World Championships
Gold medal – first place	2023 Doha	‍–‍60 kg
Bronze medal – third place	2021 Budapest	‍–‍60 kg
European Games
Silver medal – second place	2019 Minsk	‍–‍60 kg
European Championships
Gold medal – first place	2021 Lisbon	‍–‍60 kg
Gold medal – first place	2022 Sofia	‍–‍60 kg
Gold medal – first place	2024 Zagreb	‍–‍60 kg
Bronze medal – third place	2017 Warsaw	‍–‍60 kg
Bronze medal – third place	2020 Prague	‍–‍60 kg
Bronze medal – third place	2023 Montpellier	‍–‍60 kg
World Masters
Silver medal – second place	2017 Saint Petersburg	‍–‍60 kg
Silver medal – second place	2019 Qingdao	‍–‍60 kg
IJF Grand Slam
Gold medal – first place	2016 Abu Dhabi	‍–‍60 kg
Silver medal – second place	2018 Abu Dhabi	‍–‍60 kg
Silver medal – second place	2023 Tel Aviv	‍–‍60 kg
Bronze medal – third place	2017 Abu Dhabi	‍–‍60 kg
Bronze medal – third place	2019 Brasilia	‍–‍60 kg
Bronze medal – third place	2022 Antalya	‍–‍60 kg
Bronze medal – third place	2023 Abu Dhabi	‍–‍60 kg
Bronze medal – third place	2024 Paris	‍–‍60 kg
IJF Grand Prix
Gold medal – first place	2017 Cancún	‍–‍60 kg
Gold medal – first place	2019 Perth	‍–‍60 kg
Gold medal – first place	2024 Linz	‍–‍60 kg
Silver medal – second place	2023 Almada	‍–‍60 kg
Bronze medal – third place	2015 Zagreb	‍–‍60 kg
World Juniors Championships
Gold medal – first place	2014 Fort Lauderdale	‍–‍60 kg
European Junior Championships
Gold medal – first place	2014 Bucharest	‍–‍60 kg
Bronze medal – third place	2013 Sarajevo	‍–‍60 kg
Mediterranean Games
Gold medal – first place	2018 Tarragona	‍–‍60 kg
Gold medal – first place	2022 Oran	‍–‍60 kg

Profile at external databases
- IJF: 9365
- JudoInside.com: 56796
- Updated on 28 July 2024

Francisco Garrigós Rosa (born 9 December 1994) is a Spanish judoka. He won one of the bronze medals in the men's 60 kg event at the 2024 Summer Olympics held in Paris, France, the first Olympic medal for Spanish judo since the 2000 Summer Olympics. He won the gold medal in the men's 60 kg event at the 2023 World Judo Championships held in Doha, Qatar.

In 2016, he competed at the Summer Olympics in the men's 60 kg event, in which he was eliminated in the second round by Tobias Englmaier.

In 2020, Garrigos won one of the bronze medals in the men's 60 kg event at the European Judo Championships held in Prague, Czech Republic.

He won the gold medal in his event at the 2024 European Judo Championships held in Zagreb, Croatia.
