= Lukhumi Chkhvimiani =

Georgian judoka (born 1993)

Personal information
- Born: 3 May 1993 (age 33)
- Occupation: Judoka
- Height: 1.62 m (5 ft 4 in)

Sport
- Country: Georgia
- Sport: Judo
- Weight class: ‍–‍60 kg
- Retired: 24 March 2025

Achievements and titles
- Olympic Games: 7th (2020)
- World Champ.: (2019)
- European Champ.: (gold) (2019)
Medal record
Men's judo
Representing Georgia
World Championships
Gold medal – first place	2019 Tokyo	‍–‍60 kg
European Games
Gold medal – first place	2019 Minsk	‍–‍60 kg
IJF Grand Slam
Gold medal – first place	2021 Kazan	‍–‍60 kg
Silver medal – second place	2022 Antalya	‍–‍60 kg
Silver medal – second place	2022 Budapest	‍–‍60 kg
Bronze medal – third place	2015 Baku	‍–‍60 kg
Bronze medal – third place	2018 Düsseldorf	‍–‍60 kg
Bronze medal – third place	2019 Düsseldorf	‍–‍60 kg
IJF Grand Prix
Gold medal – first place	2017 Tbilisi	‍–‍60 kg
Gold medal – first place	2018 Tbilisi	‍–‍60 kg
Gold medal – first place	2019 Tbilisi	‍–‍60 kg
Bronze medal – third place	2014 Tbilisi	‍–‍60 kg
Bronze medal – third place	2015 Samsun	‍–‍60 kg
European Cadet Championships
Bronze medal – third place	2009 Koper	‍–‍55 kg

Profile at external databases
- IJF: 15116
- JudoInside.com: 57534
- Updated on 23 May 2023

Lukhumi Chkhvimiani (Georgian: ლუხუმ ჩხვიმიანი, romanized: lukhum chkhvimiani; born 3 May 1993) is a Georgian retired judoka.

Chkhvimiani won a gold medal at the 2019 World Championships.
