= David Pulkrábek =

Czech judoka

Personal information
- Nationality: Czech
- Born: 30 October 1993 (age 32)
- Occupation: Judoka

Sport
- Country: Czech Republic
- Sport: Judo
- Weight class: –60 kg

Achievements and titles
- World Champ.: R32 (2017, 2019, 2021, 2022)
- European Champ.: R16 (2014, 2019)
Medal record
Men's judo
Representing Czech Republic
IJF Grand Prix
Silver medal – second place	2022 Perth	–60 kg
Bronze medal – third place	2018 Zagreb	–60 kg
Bronze medal – third place	2018 Cancún	–60 kg
Bronze medal – third place	2019 Perth	–60 kg
European Cadet Championships
Silver medal – second place	2009 Koper	–50 kg
Youth Olympic Games
Gold medal – first place	2010 Singapore	–55 kg

Profile at external databases
- IJF: 3314
- JudoInside.com: 48911
- Updated on 29 October 2022

David Pulkrábek (born 30 October 1993) is a Czech judoka.

He is the bronze medallist of the 2018 Judo Grand Prix Zagreb in the –60 kg category.
