= Artem Lesiuk =

Ukrainian judoka (born 1996)

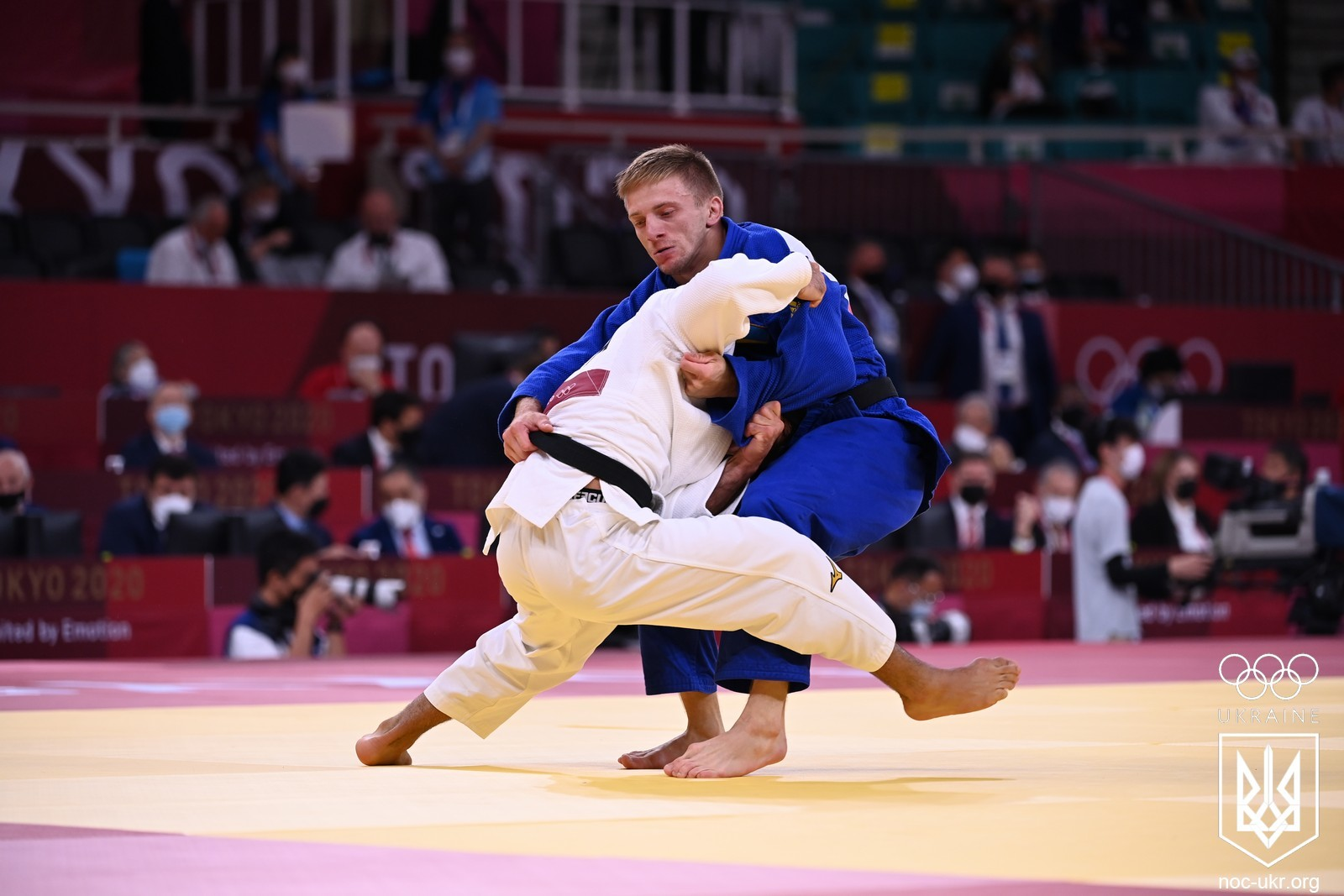

Personal information
- Born: 30 November 1996 (age 29) Kyiv, Ukraine
- Occupation: Judoka
- Height: 168 cm (5 ft 6 in)

Sport
- Country: Ukraine
- Sport: Judo
- Weight class: ‍–‍60 kg

Achievements and titles
- Olympic Games: 7th (2020)
- World Champ.: R16 (2019, 2026)
- European Champ.: 5th (2018, 2020, 2024)
Medal record
Men's judo
Representing Ukraine
IJF Grand Slam
Gold medal – first place	2022 Tel Aviv	‍–‍60 kg
Silver medal – second place	2026 Dushanbe	‍–‍60 kg
Bronze medal – third place	2023 Tbilisi	‍–‍60 kg
Bronze medal – third place	2026 Budapest	‍–‍60 kg
IJF Grand Prix
Silver medal – second place	2019 Marrakesh	‍–‍60 kg
Bronze medal – third place	2019 Perth	‍–‍60 kg
Bronze medal – third place	2023 Linz	‍–‍60 kg
European U23 Championships
Bronze medal – third place	2017 Podgorica	‍–‍60 kg

Profile at external databases
- IJF: 13721
- JudoInside.com: 90932
- Updated on 4 October 2026

Artem Lesiuk (Ukrainian: Артем Лесюк; born 30 November 1996) is a Ukrainian judoka.

== Career ==
He was the silver medalist at the 2019 Marrakech Grand Prix and he represented Ukraine at the 2020 Summer Olympics held in Tokyo, Japan. He competed in the men's 60 kg event.

He won the gold medal in his event at the 2022 Judo Grand Slam Tel Aviv held in Tel Aviv, Israel.
