= Luka Mkheidze =

French judoka (born 1996)

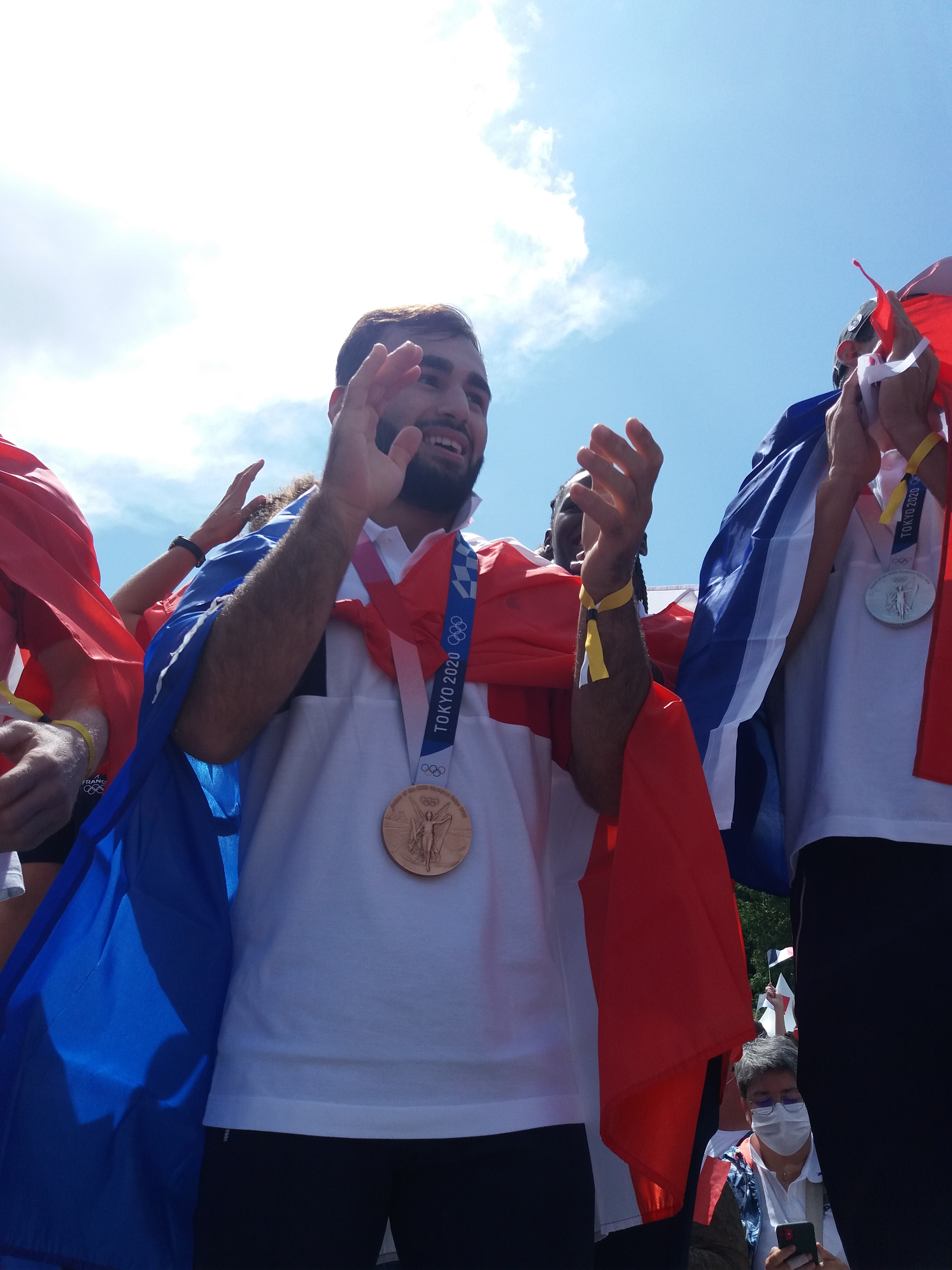
- Mkheidze in 2021

Personal information
- Born: 5 January 1996 (age 30) Tbilisi, Georgia
- Occupation: Judoka

Sport
- Country: France
- Sport: Judo
- Weight class: ‍–‍60 kg

Achievements and titles
- Olympic Games: (silver) (2024)
- World Champ.: R16 (2024, 2025)
- European Champ.: (gold) (2023, 2026)
- Highest world ranking: 1^{st}
Medal record
Men's judo
Representing France
Olympic Games
Gold medal – first place	2024 Paris	Mixed team
Silver medal – second place	2024 Paris	‍–‍60 kg
Bronze medal – third place	2020 Tokyo	‍–‍60 kg
European Championships
Gold medal – first place	2023 Montpellier	‍–‍60 kg
Gold medal – first place	2026 Tbilisi	‍–‍60 kg
Silver medal – second place	2021 Lisbon	‍–‍60 kg
Bronze medal – third place	2025 Podgorica	‍–‍60 kg
IJF Grand Slam
Gold medal – first place	2023 Tel Aviv	‍–‍60 kg
Gold medal – first place	2023 Antalya	‍–‍60 kg
Gold medal – first place	2024 Paris	‍–‍60 kg
Gold medal – first place	2025 Tbilisi	‍–‍60 kg
Silver medal – second place	2024 Baku	‍–‍60 kg
Silver medal – second place	2024 Antalya	‍–‍60 kg
Bronze medal – third place	2020 Budapest	‍–‍60 kg
Bronze medal – third place	2021 Tashkent	‍–‍60 kg
Bronze medal – third place	2022 Paris	‍–‍60 kg
IJF Grand Prix
Silver medal – second place	2018 Cancún	‍–‍60 kg
Bronze medal – third place	2023 Almada	‍–‍60 kg
Bronze medal – third place	2023 Dushanbe	‍–‍60 kg
Bronze medal – third place	2026 Zagreb	‍–‍60 kg

Profile at external databases
- IJF: 31072
- JudoInside.com: 66599
- Updated on 15 November 2026

Luka Mkheidze (Georgian: ლუკა მხეიძე, born 5 January 1996) is a French judoka of Georgian descent. Mkheidze came to France with refugee status in 2010. He won the silver medal in the men's 60 kg event at the 2024 Summer Olympics held in Paris, France. He won one of the bronze medals in the men's 60 kg event at the 2020 Summer Olympics held in Tokyo, Japan.

== Career ==
In 2021, Mkheidze won the silver medal in the men's 60 kg event at the European Judo Championships held in Lisbon, Portugal. He won one of the bronze medals in his event at the 2022 Judo Grand Slam Paris held in Paris, France. Mkheidze won the gold medal in his event at the 2023 European Judo Championships held in Montpellier, France.

== Achievements ==
Year	Tournament	Place	Weight class
2021	European Championships	2nd	−60 kg
2021	Summer Olympics	3rd	−60 kg
2023	European Championships	1st	−60 kg
2024	Summer Olympics	2nd	−60 kg
2026	European Championships	1st	−60 kg
