= Yanislav Gerchev =

Bulgarian judoka (born 1989)

Personal information
- Born: 4 October 1989 (age 36)
- Occupation: Judoka

Sport
- Country: Bulgaria
- Sport: Judo
- Weight class: ‍–‍60 kg

Achievements and titles
- Olympic Games: R16 (2016, 2020)
- World Champ.: 7th (2021)
- European Champ.: (silver) (2017, 2018, 2022)
Medal record
Men's judo
Representing Bulgaria
European Championships
Silver medal – second place	2017 Warsaw	‍–‍60 kg
Silver medal – second place	2018 Tel Aviv	‍–‍60 kg
Silver medal – second place	2022 Sofia	‍–‍60 kg
IJF Grand Slam
Bronze medal – third place	2017 Baku	‍–‍60 kg
IJF Grand Prix
Bronze medal – third place	2019 Marrakesh	‍–‍60 kg
European U23 Championships
Gold medal – first place	2011 Tyumen	‍–‍60 kg

Profile at external databases
- IJF: 2928
- JudoInside.com: 39437
- Updated on 11 November 2022

Yanislav Gerchev (Bulgarian: Янислав Герчев) (born 4 October 1989) is a Bulgarian judoka. He competed at the 2016 Summer Olympics in the men's 60 kg event, in which he was eliminated in the third round by Amiran Papinashvili.
